= List of My Family characters =

This is a list of characters for the British sitcom My Family that aired on BBC One from 17 September 2000 until 2 September 2011. My Family centres on the fictional Harper family, who live in Chiswick, west London. The family is led by parents Ben and Susan, played by Robert Lindsay and Zoë Wanamaker. They have three children, Nick (Kris Marshall), Janey (Daniela Denby-Ashe) and Michael (Gabriel Thomson). Nick is a regular character until the 2003 Christmas special, and makes one appearance in 2004's fifth series before making his final My Family appearance in the 2005 Comic Relief short as Marshall wanted to do other projects and avoid being type-cast. Janey is a regular until the 2002 Christmas special and does not appear in series 4 (2003), while the character is at University. Janey returns as a main character in series 5.

Abi Harper, played by Siobhan Hayes, first appears in series 3 as the daughter of Ben's cousin Richard (Anthony Head). Series 3 also sees the first appearance of Roger Bailey, Jnr, played by Keiron Self. Roger, who becomes a main character in the fourth series, is a dentist and the son of Ben's former mentor. In the 2005 Christmas special Alfie Butts (Rhodri Meilir), a friend of Nick's, moves into the Harper household.

== Principal cast durations ==
Character	Series																			
Character	Series 1	Series 2	Series 3	CHS 1	Series 4	CHS 2	Series 5	CHS 3	CHS 4	Series 6	CHS 5	Series 7	CHS 6	Series 8	CHS 7	Series 9	CHS 8	Series 10	CHS 9	Series 11
Ben Harper	Robert Lindsay	Robert Lindsay	Robert Lindsay	Robert Lindsay	Robert Lindsay	Robert Lindsay	Robert Lindsay	Robert Lindsay	Robert Lindsay	Robert Lindsay	Robert Lindsay	Robert Lindsay	Robert Lindsay	Robert Lindsay	Robert Lindsay	Robert Lindsay	Robert Lindsay	Robert Lindsay	Robert Lindsay	Robert Lindsay
Susan Harper	Zoë Wanamaker	Zoë Wanamaker	Zoë Wanamaker	Zoë Wanamaker	Zoë Wanamaker	Zoë Wanamaker	Zoë Wanamaker	Zoë Wanamaker	Zoë Wanamaker	Zoë Wanamaker	Zoë Wanamaker	Zoë Wanamaker	Zoë Wanamaker	Zoë Wanamaker	Zoë Wanamaker	Zoë Wanamaker	Zoë Wanamaker	Zoë Wanamaker	Zoë Wanamaker	Zoë Wanamaker
Nick Harper	Kris Marshall	Kris Marshall	Kris Marshall	Kris Marshall	Kris Marshall	Kris Marshall	Guest	Guest								Flashback				
Janey Harper	Daniela Denby-Ashe	Daniela Denby-Ashe	Daniela Denby-Ashe	Daniela Denby-Ashe			Daniela Denby-Ashe	Daniela Denby-Ashe	Daniela Denby-Ashe	Daniela Denby-Ashe	Daniela Denby-Ashe	Daniela Denby-Ashe	Daniela Denby-Ashe	Daniela Denby-Ashe	Daniela Denby-Ashe	Daniela Denby-Ashe	Daniela Denby-Ashe	Daniela Denby-Ashe	Daniela Denby-Ashe	Daniela Denby-Ashe
Michael Harper	Gabriel Thomson	Gabriel Thomson	Gabriel Thomson	Gabriel Thomson	Gabriel Thomson	Gabriel Thomson	Gabriel Thomson	Gabriel Thomson	Gabriel Thomson	Gabriel Thomson	Gabriel Thomson	Gabriel Thomson	Gabriel Thomson	Gabriel Thomson	Gabriel Thomson	Gabriel Thomson	Gabriel Thomson	Gabriel Thomson	Gabriel Thomson	Gabriel Thomson
Abi Harper			Siobhan Hayes		Siobhan Hayes	Siobhan Hayes	Siobhan Hayes	Siobhan Hayes	Siobhan Hayes	Siobhan Hayes	Siobhan Hayes	Siobhan Hayes	Siobhan Hayes	Siobhan Hayes		Flashback				
Kenzo Harper					Thomas and Noah Davis	Glyn and Hayden Holme	Glyn and Hayden Holme	Glyn and Hayden Holme	Glyn and Hayden Holme	Tayler Marshall	Tayler Marshall	Tayler Marshall	Tayler Marshall	Tayler Marshall	Tayler Marshall	Tayler Marshall	Tayler Marshall	Tayler Marshall	Tayler Marshall	Tayler Marshall
Roger Bailey			Guest		Keiron Self	Keiron Self	Keiron Self	Keiron Self	Keiron Self	Keiron Self	Keiron Self	Keiron Self	Keiron Self	Keiron Self	Keiron Self	Keiron Self	Keiron Self	Keiron Self	Keiron Self	Keiron Self
Alfie Butts									Rhodri Meilir	Rhodri Meilir	Rhodri Meilir	Rhodri Meilir	Rhodri Meilir	Rhodri Meilir	Rhodri Meilir	Rhodri Meilir				

== Main characters ==
=== Ben Harper ===
Ben Harper
- My Family character
- Portrayed by: Robert Lindsay
- Duration: 2000–2011
- First appearance: "Serpent's Tooth" (2000)
- Last appearance: A Night Out (2011)
- Created by: Fred Barron
In-universe information
- Occupation: Dentist
- Father: Tony Harper
- Mother: Vivienne Harper
- Brothers: Harold Harper; Charlie Harper
- Wife: Susan Riggs (1980—)
- Sons: Nick Harper; Michael Harper
- Daughters: Janey Harper
- Grandsons: Kenzo Harper
- Grandfathers: Lewis Harper
- Uncles: Norris Harper; Cecil; James; Bill; Frank
- Aunts: Margaret; Kate; Joan; Eleanor
- First cousins: Richard Harper; Adam Harper; Edward; Sarah; Olivia
- Other relatives: Abi Harper (first cousin once removed)

Dr Benjamin "Ben" Harper is a morose dentist who is married to Susan Harper and has three children: Nick, Janey and Michael.

He shows little patience for his family, his clients or anyone else he encounters. In most episodes he can be found trying to come up with ingenious plans to annoy his wife, get rid of his kids and sit on the sofa with a beer and the paper. He enjoys watching football (shown supporting both Arsenal and QPR) and reading Tom Clancy, although it usually takes him the better part of a year to get through a single book. He also enjoys golf, despite the fact he isn't very good. Ben and Susan have been married for thirty years, as of 2010. Despite his profession, Ben is considered by his family to be generally ignorant and dull-witted. Ben also hates Christmas and everything to do with it, although it is never revealed why he hates it so much.

His children each have their different problems, possibly due to the chronic lack of attention from their dad, who doesn't seem to care about anyone. This lack of tolerance is shown to others outside of his family, too, mainly towards his dental practice partner Roger Bailey. In reality, Ben loves his wife and children very much.

He shows that he is a supportive and protective parent when he fully accepts that his youngest son, Michael, is gay.

=== Susan Harper ===
Susan Harper
- My Family character
- Portrayed by: Zoë Wanamaker
- Duration: 2000–2011
- First appearance: "Serpent's Tooth" (2000)
- Last appearance: A Night Out (2011)
- Created by: Fred Barron
In-universe information
- Occupation: Art Gallery manager, former tour guide
- Father: Arthur Riggs
- Mother: Grace Riggs
- Stepfather: Brad
- Husband: Troy the Punisher (1973); Ben Harper (1980—)
- Sons: Nick Harper; Michael Harper
- Daughters: Janey Harper
- Grandsons: Kenzo Harper
- Grandmothers: Mary Ryman
- Uncles: Steven; Gary
- Aunts: Margaret

Susan Beryl Harper (née Riggs), MBE, is a tour guide, and later works in an art gallery. According to her family she is a bad cook. Susan is married to Ben Harper and has three children, Nick, Janey and Michael. Susan shows love to her children and husband. In the earlier series Michael calls her a control freak, which she still is. She enjoys cooking certain dishes, but uses the wrong ingredients. Ben and Susan have been married for thirty years.

Susan finds it hard to deal with the fact of her children moving out. In the same series, she had to deal with Janey moving to Manchester to go to university, and Nick flying the nest to live in his own flat. She also had to deal with Abi Harper moving into the Harper household in series 3 and Alfie in series 6.

Susan does not have a good relationship with her mother, Grace Riggs, but in the later series their relationship improved by the fact that Grace spent more time with her in the house while Ben was away. When the family appeared on Weakest Link, Grace revealed that Susan had a one-day marriage in 1973, after she married a wrestler called Troy the Punisher in Las Vegas while drunk.

In the Christmas Special 2008 Susan is awarded an MBE for charity work.

=== Nick Harper ===
Nick Harper
- My Family character
- Portrayed by: Kris Marshall
- Duration: 2000–2005
- First appearance: "Serpent's Tooth" (2000)
- Last appearance: "The Erroneous Storm" (2005)
- Created by: Fred Barron
In-universe information
- Father: Ben Harper
- Mother: Susan Harper
- Brothers: Michael Harper
- Sisters: Janey Harper
- Grandfathers: Arthur Riggs; Tony Harper
- Grandmothers: Grace Riggs; Vivienne Harper
- Uncles: Harold Harper; Vernon
- Nephews: Kenzo Harper
- First cousins: Kirsty
- Other relatives: Richard Harper (first cousin once removed); Abi Harper (2nd cousin)

Nicolas "Nick" Harper (born 15 June 1980) is the oldest child of Ben and Susan, the older brother of Janey and Michael and the uncle of Kenzo. It was after finding out that Susan was pregnant with him that his parents married. His silly behaviour makes him unintentionally annoying to his family, yet his laid back personality makes him fairly popular with women. Nick seems to get himself in awkward situations with other people, often getting confused as to what he is actually doing. Nick has attempted many jobs, such as a female impersonator, stunt-man, stripper, magician, landlord and exorcist but was hopelessly unsuccessful at all of them. Kris Marshall left at the end of series 4 as he had grown tired with portraying an immature character much younger than his actual age. He guested for two episodes of series 5 and the 2005 Comic Relief Special before never returning to the show again.

He is often mentioned after his departure. In 2007, Alfie (the Harper's lodger who arrives as a friend of Nick's two years before) finds a postcard from Nick telling his family that if Alfie turns up claiming to be a friend not to believe him, but he quickly disposes of it. A B-story of the 2010 Christmas special is based around Michael recording a Christmas message to send to Nick.

=== Janey Harper ===
Janey Harper
- My Family character
- Portrayed by: Daniela Denby-Ashe
- Duration: 2000–2002, 2004–2011
- First appearance: "Serpent's Tooth" (2000)
- Last appearance: A Night Out (2011)
- Introduced by: Fred Barron (2000); James Hendrie (2004)
In-universe information
- Occupation: Home Care worker
- Father: Ben Harper
- Mother: Susan Harper
- Brothers: Nick Harper; Michael Harper
- Husband: Ches Rochester (2005, divorced)
- Sons: Kenzo Harper
- Grandfathers: Arthur Riggs; Tony Harper
- Grandmothers: Grace Riggs; Vivienne Harper
- Uncles: Harold Harper; Vernon
- First cousins: Kirsty
- Other relatives: Richard Harper (first cousin once removed); Abi Harper (2nd cousin)

Jane Elizabeth Laura Harper (previously Rochester) is the only daughter of Ben and Susan, the younger sister of Nick and the older sister of Michael. She is vain and is shallow. She is a shopaholic who is very concerned with her clothes and physical appearance. Much to Ben's dismay, she is sexually promiscuous and becomes pregnant at 18; then chooses to be a single mother and refuses to reveal her son's paternity, to the frustration of her mother. She names the baby Kenzo although her original choice of name was "Prada-Handbag" according to Susan. She later marries Ches Rochester, who is old enough to be her father, but asks for a divorce at her wedding reception. She develops a bad headache when she goes without sexual intercourse for more than two weeks at a time: this causes her to become very aroused and to chase after any man she sees.

She temporarily leaves the cast in series 4 after going to the University of Manchester to study Communications in series 3, from where she drops out during the fifth series and returns to live near the rest of her family. She later becomes a home care assistant, and is bequeathed a flat by a pensioner with Alzheimer's disease who was one of her patients.

=== Michael Harper ===
Michael Harper
- My Family character
- Portrayed by: Gabriel Thomson
- Duration: 2000–2011
- First appearance: "Serpent's Tooth" (2000)
- Last appearance: A Night Out (2011)
- Created by: Fred Barron
In-universe information
- Occupation: Student
- Father: Ben Harper
- Mother: Susan Harper
- Brothers: Nick Harper
- Sisters: Janey Harper
- Grandfathers: Arthur Riggs; Tony Harper
- Grandmothers: Grace Riggs; Vivienne Harper
- Uncles: Harold Harper; Vernon
- Nephews: Kenzo Harper
- First cousins: Kirsty
- Other relatives: Richard Harper (first cousin once removed); Abi Harper (2nd cousin)

Michael Harper is Ben and Susan's unplanned third and youngest child, the younger brother of Nick and Janey and the uncle of Kenzo.

At the start of the show Michael was a typical 'geek' who is highly intelligent if sometimes naive, and exhibits a strong sense of morality and integrity, attempting to win the election for student president as a conservative or "Tory" by honest means. However, as the show goes on and he matures he becomes very interested in the opposite sex and develops something of a dark, cynical sense of humour. He has displayed Machiavellian tendencies in his dealing with others and has demonstrated excellent skill as a businessman. As a teenager he is usually well-dressed, differing from his more geeky persona at the start of the series. Michael used to have a crush on Abi, his second cousin in series 3. He is something of a black sheep of the Harper family, differing considerably from his relatives.

As the youngest member of the Harper family, he is at secondary school until series 6. When the eighth series begins, Michael has been at University for six months. He is also known for being a supporter of the Conservative Party (as opposed to his Labour Party father). Ben likes to refer to him as "Mikey."

Despite showing an interest in several girls throughout the early series, Michael comes out as gay in the second episode of series 10 ("The Son'll Come Out"), first to Ben after coming home drunk then later to Susan. He then tells them that he has been in a relationship with a man for some time, a 25-year-old solicitor called Scott Marsh, who later moves into the Harper residence. Michael is later seen in gay clubs picking up men and giving out his number, suggesting that he and Scott have broken up, but they later get back together.

=== Roger Bailey ===
Roger Bailey, Jnr.
- My Family character
- Portrayed by: Keiron Self
- Duration: 2002–2011
- First appearance: "The Second Greatest Story Ever Told" (2002)
- Last appearance: "A Night Out" (2011)
- Created by: Fred Barron
In-universe information
- Occupation: Dentist
- Father: Roger Bailey, Snr.
- Mother: Nerys Bailey
- Wife: Abi Harper (2007–08)

Dr. Roger Bailey, Jr. (born 1981) is the husband of Abi Harper. Roger, a dentist, first appears in "The Second Greatest Story Every Told" (2002), as the son of Ben's dental mentor, Roger Bailey, Snr. Roger's next appearance is in "Fitting Punishment" (2003), when much to Ben's annoyance, he buys the surgery below Ben's. Soon afterwards he falls in love with Abi Harper, Ben's first cousin once removed, and she eventually falls in love with him and he proposes in "The Art of Being Susan" (2006). They marry in "Abi Ever After" (2007), with Ben as best man and Janey as bridesmaid. By the start of series 8 (2008), Roger has become a Special Constable. Roger is frequently depicted as childlike, simple-minded, cheerful and enthusiastic, serving as a direct contrast to Ben. He is shown in some episodes to be a fan of The Lord of the Rings.

=== Abi Bailey ===
Abi Bailey
- My Family character
- Portrayed by: Siobhan Hayes
- Duration: 2002–2008
- First appearance: "Desperately Squeaking Susan" (2002)
- Last appearance: "The Abi Habit" (2008)
- Created by: Fred Barron
In-universe information
- Father: Richard Harper
- Mother: Shelley Harper
- Sisters: One unnamed
- Husband: Roger Bailey (2007–08)
- Other relatives: Tony Harper (great-uncle); Nick Harper (second cousin); Janey Harper (second cousin); Michael Harper (second cousin); Kenzo Harper (second cousin once removed); Ben Harper (first cousin once removed); Susan Harper (cousin-In-Law)

Abigail Therese Bernarde "Abi" Bailey (née Harper; born 1979) is Ben's first cousin once removed.

Her father, Richard Harper, is Ben's cousin and he has been married and divorced five times. Her mother, Shelley, has been married and divorced many times too; one parent had a second daughter who is occasionally mentioned. Abi came into the Harper household in the third episode of the third series to stay with them while she was at college. Susan invited her to stay following Janey's departure to University. Although good natured, Abi is very accident-prone, especially in the earlier series, where she puts her hand through a window, and hits Ben around the head with a cricket bat, thinking he is an intruder.

She tries a variety of different jobs such as a salesperson, a Victorian Hussy at the London Dungeon, and a car mechanic, which leads her to dismantling Ben's car and leaving it in pieces on the kitchen table. Abi has a few boyfriends, before finally falling in love with Roger Bailey and agreeing to marry him. They marry in the seventh series, with Janey as bridesmaid, Ben as best man and Susan as the Maid of honor. She is a Catholic, and, in the final episode of series 8, she becomes a nun, and opts to stay with her order rather than to return home with Roger.

=== Alfie Butts ===
Alfie Butts
- My Family character
- Portrayed by: Rhodri Meilir
- Duration: 2005–2009
- First appearance: "... And I'll Cry If I Want To" (2005)
- Last appearance: "Kenzo's Project" (2009)
- Created by: Fred Barron
In-universe information
- Uncles: Idris; Maldwyn; Dewi; Dafydd
- Aunts: Bronwyn
- First cousins: Huw

Alfie Butts (born 1978) is a Welshman who turns up at the house in the 2005 Christmas Special. He says that he is a friend of Nick's, and he subsequently moves in with the family. He is always slow when he moves or speaks. A starting musician, he is not very successful in the industry and says that he is not interested in chart success. However, a comment in "Kenzo's Project" suggests that he makes and sells albums. In series 7, he collapses during a live music webcast, in an attempt to gain popularity.

While he claims to be a friend of Nick's, a postcard is discovered in series 9 that says, "If a bloke called Alfie Butts turns up claiming to be a mate and says he can stay, do not under any circumstances let him stay", suggesting that he really should not be there.

=== Kenzo Harper ===
Kenzo Harper
- My Family character
- Portrayed by: Tayler Marshall (2006-11); Glyn and Hayden Holme (2004-05); Thomas and Noah Davis (2004)
- Duration: 2003–2011
- First appearance: "Deliverance" (2003)
- Last appearance: "A Night Out" (2011)
- Created by: Fred Barron
In-universe information
- Occupation: Student
- Father: Mark Jameson
- Mother: Janey Harper
- Stepmother: Linda Jameson (until 2010)
- Grandfathers: Ben Harper
- Grandmothers: Susan Harper
- Uncles: Nick Harper; Michael Harper
- Other relatives: Richard Harper (2nd cousin); Abi Harper (2nd cousin once removed); Grace Riggs (great-grandmother) Arthur Riggs (great grandfather); Vivienne Harper (great- grandmother); Tony Harper (great-grandfather)

Kenzo Harper is the son of Janey Harper and Mark Jameson, the grandson of Ben and Susan, the nephew of Nick and Michael, and the apple of Susan's eye. He is shown to be very intelligent in later series, and can even outwit most members of the family. Kenzo is sometimes embarrassed by his mother, and consequently denies that Janey is his mother; he even once said that he did not like her. He also likes to play jokes on his family and tries to outsmart them any way he can, once locking his grandfather out of the house for hours. His uncle Michael said that his mother called him Kenzo after the fashion brand.

== Recurring characters ==
=== Grace Riggs ===
Grace Riggs
- My Family character
- Portrayed by: Avril Elgar (2001); Rosemary Leach (2003–07)
- Duration: 2001, 2003, 2004–2005, 2006, 2007
- First appearance: "'Tis A Pity She's A Whore" (2001)
- Last appearance: "Susan of Troy" (2007)
- Created by: Fred Barron
In-universe information
- Mother: Mary Ryman
- Husband: Arthur Riggs (divorced); Brad (2007-11)
- Daughters: Susan Harper
- Grandsons: Nick Harper; Michael Harper
- Granddaughters: Janey Harper
- Other relatives: Kenzo Harper (great-grandson)

Grace Riggs (née Ryman) is Susan's mother, and is often the subject of many arguments between Ben and Susan. She also has an open alcohol problem and is regularly seen dating men. Her last on screen appearance was in 'Susan of Troy', when she revealed that Susan was once married to a wrestler, much to the surprise of Ben. In the series 11 episode, 'A Decent Proposal', Grace's funeral is held. In Grace's first appearance (played by Avril Elgar), the character is credited as "Rebecca".

=== Brigitte ===
Brigitte
- My Family character
- Portrayed by: Daisy Donovan
- Duration: 2000
- First appearance: "The Serpent's Tooth" (2000)
- Last appearance: "Much Ado About Ben" (2000)
- Created by: Fred Barron

Brigitte is Ben's dental assistant who only appears in the first series. She often goes into moods with Ben for frivolous things and refuses to help and do her job until he apologises, although she does occasionally side with him. She often involves Ben in her many strange endeavours almost always resulting in embarrassment for him.

=== Others ===
My Family features several recurring characters, some of the more notable ones are listed below.

Character	Actor	Duration	Role	Appearances
"Stupid" Brian	Kevin Bishop	2001	Janey's Boyfriend	3
Hotel Receptionist	Andy Taylor	2001, 2002, 2004, 2007	Hotel Receptionist	5
Mr. Alexander Casey	Nickolas Grace	2001, 2008, 2010	Neighbour	3
Richard Harper	Anthony Head; Nathaniel Parker	2003; 2009	Ben's Cousin and Abi's Father	1; 1
Fiona	Rachel Hyde-Harvey	2003	Michael's Girlfriend	3
Hubert	Alex Dawson	2003, 2004, 2006	Michael's Friend	7
Dennis	Mike Walling	2006, 2007, 2009, 2011	A Parish Vicar	6
James Garrett	Robert Bathurst	2006, 2007, 2009	Art collector	3
Mark	Theo Fraser Steele; Alastair Southey	2007; 2011	Kenzo's Father	1; 1
Scott Marsh	Nathan Brine	2010–2011	Michael's Boyfriend	4
Craig Willoughby	Ben Uttley	2010–2011	Janey's Boyfriend	3
