= List of My Family episodes =

My Family is a British television sitcom, created and co-written by Fred Barron and broadcast on BBC One. The initial cast consisted of Robert Lindsay, Zoë Wanamaker, Kris Marshall, Daniela Denby-Ashe and Gabriel Thomson, before Siobhan Hayes, Keiron Self, Rhodri Meilir and Tayler Marshall joined the series. Marshall was the only original cast member not to appear until the series' conclusion, as Denby-Ashe made a brief departure during its run before returning.

During the course of the programme, 120 episodes of My Family aired, including ten specials over eleven series, between 19 September 2000 and 2 September 2011.

== Series overview ==
Series
Series	Episodes	Originally released	
Series	Episodes	First released	Last released
1	8	19 September 2000	7 November 2000
2	13	31 August 2001	30 November 2001
3	13	6 September 2002	12 December 2002
3	Special	25 December 2002	
4	13	21 March 2003	13 June 2003
4	Special	25 December 2003	
5	14	12 March 2004	18 June 2004
5	Specials	24 December 2004	25 December 2005
6	7	10 March 2006	28 April 2006
6	Special	25 December 2006	
7	9	6 April 2007	8 June 2007
7	Special	26 December 2007	
8	7	11 April 2008	23 May 2008
8	Special	24 December 2008	
9	9	2 April 2009	14 May 2009
9	Special	24 December 2009	
10	9	9 July 2010	27 August 2010
10	Special	24 December 2010	
11	9	1 July 2011	2 September 2011

== Episodes ==
=== Series 1 (2000) ===
No. overall	No. in series	Title	Directed by	Written by	Original release date	UK viewers (millions)
1	1	"The Serpent's Tooth"	Baz Taylor	James Hendrie and Ian Brown	19 September 2000	8.48
2	2	"Pain in the Class"	Baz Taylor	James Hendrie and Ian Brown	26 September 2000	7.46
3	3	"Droit de Seigneur Ben"	Baz Taylor	Fred Barron and Shawn Schepps	3 October 2000	5.95
4	4	"The Last Resort"	Baz Taylor	Steve Armogida, Jim Armogida, Ian Brown and James Hendrie	10 October 2000	5.42
5	5	"Farewell to Alarms"	Baz Taylor	Steve Armogida and Jim Armogida	17 October 2000	6.89
6	6	"Death Takes a Policy"	Baz Taylor	Fred Barron and Penny Croft	24 October 2000	6.19
7	7	"The Awkward Phase"	Baz Taylor	Fred Barron	30 October 2000	8.38
8	8	"Much Ado About Ben"	Baz Taylor	Steve Armogida and Jim Armogida	7 November 2000	7.62

=== Series 2 (2001) ===
No. overall	No. in series	Title	Directed by	Written by	Original release date	UK viewers (millions)
9	1	"All Roads Lead to Ramon"	Dewi Humphreys	James Hendrie and Ian Brown	31 August 2001	8.94
10	2	"The Unkindest Cut"	Dewi Humphreys	Steve Armogida and Jim Armogida	7 September 2001	9.04
11	3	"Parisian Beauty"	Dewi Humphreys	Andrea Solomons	14 September 2001	8.24
12	4	"Trust Never Sleeps"	Dewi Humphreys	James Hendrie and Ian Brown	21 September 2001	9.55
13	5	"Death and Ben Take a Holiday"	Dewi Humphreys	Fred Barron	28 September 2001	9.65
14	6	"Driving Miss Crazy"	Dewi Humphreys	James Hendrie and Ian Brown	5 October 2001	11.00
15	7	"I Second That Emulsion"	Dewi Humphreys	James Hendrie and Ian Brown	12 October 2001	11.16
16	8	"Age of Romance"	Dewi Humphreys	James Hendrie and Ian Brown	19 October 2001	11.22
17	9	"Get Cartier"	Dewi Humphreys	Fred Barron	26 October 2001	11.05
18	10	"'Tis a Pity She's a Whore"	Dewi Humphreys	Steve Armogida and Jim Armogida	2 November 2001	11.06
19	11	"The Last Supper"	Dewi Humphreys	Steve Armogida and Jim Armogida	9 November 2001	12.54
20	12	"Ben Wants to Be a Millionaire"	Dewi Humphreys	Steve Armogida and Jim Armogida	23 November 2001	11.22
21	13	"Breakable"	Dewi Humphreys	James Hendrie and Ian Brown	30 November 2001	11.15

=== Series 3 (2002) ===
No. overall	No. in series	Title	Directed by	Written by	Original release date	UK viewers (millions)
Series
22	1	"Absent Vixen, Cheeky Monkey"	Dewi Humphreys	James Hendrie and Ian Brown	6 September 2002	8.10
23	2	"Shrink Rap"	Dewi Humphreys	Fred Barron and Sophie Hetherington	13 September 2002	8.28
24	3	"Desperately Squeaking Susan"	Dewi Humphreys	James Hendrie and Ian Brown	20 September 2002	8.23
25	4	"Of Mice and Ben"	Dewi Humphreys	Steve Armogida and Jim Armogida	27 September 2002	8.12
26	5	"Imperfect Strangers"	Dewi Humphreys	James Hendrie and Ian Brown	3 October 2002	7.34
27	6	"The Second Greatest Story Ever Told"	Dewi Humphreys	Steve Armogida and Jim Armogida	10 October 2002	8.14
28	7	"Waiting to Inhale"	Dewi Humphreys	Fred Barron	17 October 2002	6.16
29	8	"Misery"	Dewi Humphreys	Andrea Solomons	24 October 2002	8.57
30	9	"Auto Erotica"	Dewi Humphreys	Steve Armogida and Jim Armogida	7 November 2002	7.94
31	10	"A Handful of Dust"	Dewi Humphreys	James Hendrie and Ian Brown	21 November 2002	7.82
32	11	"The Lost Weekend"	Dewi Humphreys	James Hendrie and Ian Brown	28 November 2002	7.23
33	12	"Ghosts"	Dewi Humphreys	Andrea Solomons	5 December 2002	7.68
34	13	"One Flew Out of the Cuckoo’s Nest"	Dewi Humphreys	Steve Armogida and Jim Armogida	12 December 2002	7.24
Special
35	S	"Ding Dong Merrily"	Dewi Humphreys	James Hendrie and Ian Brown	25 December 2002	8.57

=== Series 4 (2003) ===
No. overall	No. in series	Title	Directed by	Written by	Original release date	UK viewers (millions)
Series
36	1	"Fitting Punishment"	Dewi Humphreys	James Hendrie and Ian Brown	21 March 2003	8.77
37	2	"They Shoot Harpers, Don’t They?"	Dewi Humphreys	James Hendrie and Ian Brown	28 March 2003	9.76
38	3	"The Great Escape"	Dewi Humphreys	Steve Armogida and Jim Armogida	4 April 2003	10.17
39	4	"Return of the Prodigal Prat"	Dewi Humphreys	Steve Armogida and Jim Armogida	11 April 2003	9.56
40	5	"Owed to Susan"	Dewi Humphreys	Steve Armogida and Jim Armogida	18 April 2003	8.57
41	6	"Deliverance"	Dewi Humphreys	Andrea Solomons	25 April 2003	7.32
42	7	"Blind Justice"	Dewi Humphreys	Andrea Solomons	2 May 2003	8.31
43	8	"Friday the 31st"	Dewi Humphreys	James Hendrie and Ian Brown	9 May 2003	8.47
44	9	"Sitting Targets"	Dewi Humphreys	James Hendrie and Ian Brown	16 May 2003	9.89
45	10	"Loco Parentis"	Dewi Humphreys	Andrea Solomons	23 May 2003	6.79
46	11	"Canary Cage"	Dewi Humphreys	James Hendrie and Ian Brown	30 May 2003	6.72
47	12	"May the Best Man Win"	Dewi Humphreys	Georgia Pritchett	6 June 2003	7.28
48	13	"It's a Window Filled Life"	Dewi Humphreys	Fred Barron and Sophie Hetherington	13 June 2003	6.61
Special
49	S	"Sixty Feet Under"	Jay Sandrich	James Hendrie and Ian Brown	25 December 2003	8.66

=== Series 5 (2004–05) ===
No. overall	No. in series	Title	Directed by	Written by	Original release date	UK viewers (millions)
Special
50	S	"Reloaded"	Dewi Humphreys	Andrea Solomons	12 March 2004	7.50
Series
51	1	"The Mummy Returns"	Dewi Humphreys	James Hendrie and Ian Brown	19 March 2004	9.17
52	2	"You Don't Know Jack"	Dewi Humphreys	Andrea Solomons	26 March 2004	7.69
53	3	"What's Up, Docklands?"	Dewi Humphreys	James Hendrie and Ian Brown	2 April 2004	7.24
54	4	"Luck Be a Lady Tonight"	Dewi Humphreys	James Hendrie and Ian Brown	16 April 2004	7.63
55	5	"First Past the Post"	Dewi Humphreys	James Hendrie and Ian Brown	23 April 2004	7.58
56	6	"My Will Be Done"	Dewi Humphreys	Andrea Solomons	30 April 2004	6.05
57	7	"My Fair Charlady"	Dewi Humphreys	Steve Armogida and Jim Armogida	7 May 2004	8.13
58	8	"The Mouthtrap"	Dewi Humphreys	Andrea Solomons	14 May 2004	6.53
59	9	"While You Weren't Sleeping"	Dewi Humphreys	Darin Henry	21 May 2004	7.40
60	10	"Dentist to the Stars"	Dewi Humphreys	James Cary	28 May 2004	4.48
61	11	"A Wife Less Ordinary"	Dewi Humphreys	Sophie Hetherington	4 June 2004	4.98
62	12	"The Book of Love"	Dewi Humphreys	Steve Armogida and Jim Armogida	11 June 2004	5.19
63	13	"Going Dental"	Dewi Humphreys	James Hendrie and Ian Brown	18 June 2004	5.62
Specials
64	S	"Glad Tidings We Bring"	Dewi Humphreys	Andrea Solomons, James Hendrie and Ian Brown	24 December 2004	8.91
*	S	"Comic Relief Special"	Dewi Humphreys	Fred Barron, Ian Brown and James Hendrie	11 March 2005	N/A
65	S	"...And I'll Cry If I Want to"	Dewi Humphreys	Brian Leveson and Paul Minett	25 December 2005	5.85

=== Series 6 (2006) ===
No. overall	No. in series	Title	Directed by	Written by	Original release date	UK viewers (millions)
Series
66	1	"Bliss for Idiots"	Dewi Humphreys	Brian Leveson and Paul Minett	10 March 2006	7.17
67	2	"The Spokes Person"	Dewi Humphreys	Brian Leveson, Paul Minett, Bert Tyler-Moore, George Jeffrie and Tess Morris	17 March 2006	7.42
68	3	"Dentally Unstable"	Dewi Humphreys	Andrea Solomons	31 March 2006	6.41
69	4	"Living the Dream"	Dewi Humphreys	Tom Leopold	7 April 2006	6.28
70	5	"An Embarrassment of Susans"	Dewi Humphreys	Steve Armogida and Jim Armogida	14 April 2006	6.10
71	6	"And Other Animals"	Dewi Humphreys	Tom Leopold	21 April 2006	6.17
72	7	"The Art of Being Susan"	Dewi Humphreys	Brian Leveson and Paul Minett	28 April 2006	6.22
Special
73	S	"The Heart of Christmas"	Dewi Humphreys	Brian Leveson and Paul Minett	25 December 2006	5.09

=== Series 7 (2007) ===
No. overall	No. in series	Title	Directed by	Written by	Original release date	UK viewers (millions)
Series
74	1	"The Ego Has Landed"	Dewi Humphreys	Tom Anderson	6 April 2007	6.65
75	2	"Four Affairs and a Funeral"	Dewi Humphreys	Steve Armogida and Jim Armogida	13 April 2007	5.58
76	3	"Once More With Feeling"	Dewi Humphreys	Steve Armogida and Jim Armogida	20 April 2007	5.64
77	4	"Dutch Art and Dutch Courage"	Dewi Humphreys	Steve Armogida and Jim Armogida	27 April 2007	5.72
78	5	"Susan of Troy"	Dewi Humphreys	Ed Dyson	4 May 2007	6.48
79	6	"One of the Boys"	Dewi Humphreys	David Cantor	11 May 2007	6.76
80	7	"Abi Ever After"	Dewi Humphreys	George Jeffrie and Bert Tyler-Moore	18 May 2007	5.86
81	8	"Breaking Up Ain't Hard to Do"	Dewi Humphreys	Brian Leveson and Paul Minett	25 May 2007	5.57
82	9	"Life Begins at Fifty"	Dewi Humphreys	George Jeffrie and Bert Tyler-Moore	8 June 2007	4.84
Special
83	S	"Ho Ho No"	Baz Taylor	Tom Anderson	26 December 2007	6.14

=== Series 8 (2008) ===
No. overall	No. in series	Title	Directed by	Written by	Original release date	UK viewers (millions)
Series
84	1	"The Parent Trap"	Baz Taylor	Brian Leveson and Paul Minett	11 April 2008	5.56
85	2	"Let's Not Be Heisty"	Baz Taylor	Ed Dyson	18 April 2008	5.43
86	3	"Cards on the Table"	Baz Taylor	Brian Leveson and Paul Minett	25 April 2008	5.23
87	4	"The Wax Job"	Baz Taylor	Steve Armogida and Jim Armogida	2 May 2008	5.13
88	5	"Neighbour Wars"	Baz Taylor	Darin Henry	9 May 2008	5.02
89	6	"Can't Get No Satisfaction"	Nic Phillips	David Cantor	16 May 2008	4.89
90	7	"The Abi Habit"	Nic Phillips	Tom Anderson	23 May 2008	4.74
Special
91	S	"Have a Unhappy Christmas"	Nic Phillips	Brian Leveson and Paul Minett	24 December 2008	7.12

=== Series 9 (2009) ===
No. overall	No. in series	Title	Directed by	Written by	Original release date	UK viewers (millions)
Series
92	1	"Bully for Ben"	Nic Phillips	Brian Leveson and Paul Minett	2 April 2009	6.72
93	2	"Bringing Up Janey"	Nic Phillips	Amy Shindler	9 April 2009	4.93
94	3	"A Very Brief Encounter"	Nic Phillips	Steve Armogida and Jim Armogida	16 April 2009	4.69
95	4	"The Psyche of Mikey"	Nic Phillips	Ed Dyson	19 April 2009	4.48
96	5	"A Difficult Undertaking"	Nic Phillips	Andrew Kreisberg	19 April 2009	4.48
97	6	"Dog Dazed"	Nic Phillips	Steve Armogida and Jim Armogida	23 April 2009	5.14
98	7	"It's Training Men"	Nic Phillips	Robyn Taylor	30 April 2009	5.15
99	8	"The Guru"	Nic Phillips	Darin Henry	7 May 2009	5.24
100	9	"Kenzo's Project"	Nic Phillips	Tom Anderson and Darin Henry	14 May 2009	4.91
Special
101	S	"2039: A Christmas Oddity"	Ed Bye	Tom Anderson and David Cantor	24 December 2009	5.59

=== Series 10 (2010) ===
No. overall	No. in series	Title	Directed by	Written by	Original release date	UK viewers (millions)
Series
102	1	"Wheelie Ben"	Ed Bye	Amy Shindler	9 July 2010	4.33
103	2	"The Son'll Come Out"	Ed Bye	Tom Anderson	16 July 2010	4.78
104	3	"Desperately Stalking Susan"	Ed Bye	Brian Leveson and Paul Minett	23 July 2010	4.42
105	4	"The Melbourne Identity"	Ed Bye	Brian Leveson and Paul Minett	30 July 2010	4.66
106	5	"He's Just Not That into Ben"	Ed Bye	Dan Staley	6 August 2010	4.89
107	6	"Slammertime"	Ed Bye	George Jeffrie and Bert Tyler-Moore	13 August 2010	4.70
108	7	"Ben Behaving Badly"	Ed Bye	Tom Anderson	27 August 2010	4.09
Special
109	S	"Mary Christmas"	Ed Bye	Brian Leveson, Paul Minett & Darin Henry	24 December 2010	6.40

=== Series 11 (2011) ===
No. overall	No. in series	Title	Directed by	Written by	Original release date	UK viewers (millions)
110	1	"Janey's Choice"	Ed Bye	Andrew Kreisberg	17 June 2011 (Note: Originally unaired by the BBC, the ninth episode of the tenth series, Janey's Choice ", was first released on the series 10 DVD and eventually went to air on 17 June 2011 during the run of the eleventh series.)	4.37 (Note: Based on its 17 June 2011 broadcast.)
111	2	"Labour Pains"	Ed Bye	Darin Henry	1 July 2011	4.42
112	3	"Accusin' Susan"	Ed Bye	Robin Taylor	8 July 2011	3.62
113	4	"Germs of Endearment"	Ed Bye	Ed Dyson	15 July 2011	3.81
114	5	"Harper vs. Harper"	Ed Bye	Steve Armogida and Jim Armogida	22 July 2011 (Note: Originally unaired by the BBC, the eighth episode of the tenth series, "Harper vs. Harper", was first released on the series 10 DVD and eventually went to air on 22 July 2011 during the run of the eleventh series.)	4.13 (Note: Based on its 22 July 2011 broadcast.)
115	6	"Relationship Happens"	Ed Bye	Ed Dyson	29 July 2011	3.83
116	7	"Facebooked"	Ed Bye	Steve Armogida and Jim Armogida	5 August 2011	4.01
117	8	"A Decent Proposal"	Ed Bye	David Cantor	12 August 2011	3.79
118	9	"Darts All, Folks"	Ed Bye	Darin Henry	19 August 2011	3.70
119	10	"Susan for a Bruisin'"	Ed Bye	Darin Henry	26 August 2011	3.74
120	11	"A Night Out"	Ed Bye	David Cantor	2 September 2011	3.89

== Comic Relief special ==
A special five-minute sketch, titled "The Erroneous Storm", was included as part of Comic Relief and broadcast on 11 March 2005. The story takes place during a thunderstorm in which, after being scared, Michael and Janey join Ben and Susan in their bedroom. They are soon joined by Nick who, thanks to now being a party reviewer, brings with him Adam Hart-Davis, Anthony Head, Myleene Klass, Nell McAndrew, Dermot Murnaghan, Clive Russell and Jamie Theakston. It was directed by Dewi Humphreys and written by James Hendrie and Ian Brown. The short special attracted 10.94 million viewers.
