= My Family series 3 =

My Family
- Series 3
- My Family Series 3 DVD Cover
- No. of episodes: 13 + Christmas Special

Release
- Original network: BBC One
- Original release: 6 September – 25 December 2002

Series chronology
- ← Previous; 2 Next → 4

The third series of the BBC family sitcom My Family originally aired between 6 September 2002 and 25 December 2002. The series was commissioned following consistently high ratings for the second series. The opening episode of the series, "Absent Vixen, Cheeky Monkey", re-introduces the five main characters, but also writes out the character of Janey, who plays only a recurring role in this series. In Episode 3, Abi Harper, played by Siobhan Hayes, is introduced to replace Janey. All fourteen episodes in the third series are thirty minutes in length, including the Christmas special. The series was once again produced by Rude Boy Productions, a company that produces comedies created by Fred Barron. The series was filmed at Pinewood Studios in London, in front of a live audience.

== Episode Information ==
| No. overall | No. in series | Title | Directed by | Written by | Original release date | UK viewers (millions) |
|---|---|---|---|---|---|---|
Series
| 22 | 1 | "Absent Vixen, Cheeky Monkey" | Dewi Humphreys | James Hendrie and Ian Brown | 6 September 2002 | 8.10 |
After Janey leaves home to go to Manchester University, Ben and Susan fight for who will get her room, Susan begins to miss Janey too much and begins to bug Ben about it every night. Meanwhile, Nick gets a job as a shelf stacker at a supermarket called Freshfair and brings his work home with him, while Michael is reading The Art of War by Sun Tzu.
| 23 | 2 | "Shrink Rap" | Dewi Humphreys | Fred Barron and Sophie Hetherington | 13 September 2002 | 8.28 |
Susan "finds" a letter in Michael's room from the school about an "Auction of Promises", which he had hidden because he finds his parents embarrassing. However, Ben and Susan go to the Auction anyway, with Susan donating a tour and Ben donating a dental session. Susan bids for everything, including a counselling session, which she and Ben then attend. Absent: Nick Harper and Janey Harper
| 24 | 3 | "Desperately Squeaking Susan" | Dewi Humphreys | James Hendrie and Ian Brown | 20 September 2002 | 8.23 |
Following Janey's absence, Susan feels a void and needs female company, so she invites Ben's first cousin once removed Abi Harper (Siobhan Hayes), who has just started at Art College in London, round for dinner. However, they end up in Casualty when Abi puts her hand through a window. Susan then invites Abi to come and live with them, much to Ben's annoyance. Meanwhile, Nick becomes a magician under the name Brian Miles while Susan plays the cello. First Episode: Abi Harper Absent: Janey Harper
| 25 | 4 | "Of Mice and Ben" | Dewi Humphreys | Steve Armogida and Jim Armogida | 27 September 2002 | 8.12 |
Ben and Susan agree that Abi can make a film of them for her film class, to portray a "typical married couple". Meanwhile, there is a rat which seems to survive every trap set for it. It is eventually found to be nestled in the basement where it comes face to face with Ben, whose terrified reaction is caught on camera by Abi who then sells it to a TV programme called When Animals Attack. Absent: Nick Harper and Janey Harper
| 26 | 5 | "Imperfect Strangers" | Dewi Humphreys | James Hendrie and Ian Brown | 3 October 2002 | 7.34 |
After getting a call of distress from Janey, Ben and Susan drive up to Manchester where they discover they are not needed after all, so they decide to stay in Maythorne Metrolodge on the M62. Once there they decide to pretend to be strangers under the names Delores DeLarge and Johnny Studd, and meet for the first time. Meanwhile, Abi invites her boyfriend Michael (Matthew Ashforde) round, and the other Michael tells lies to make sure he leaves, leaving Abi furious. Absent: Nick Harper
| 27 | 6 | "The Second Greatest Story Ever Told" | Dewi Humphreys | Steve Armogida and Jim Armogida | 10 October 2002 | 8.14 |
Susan auditions for the community theatre's nativity play, but ends up with the role of Shepherd Number Two, while Nick is given the part of Jesus, but she soon tries to expand her character. Abi has a new job at a coffee shop, where Michael finds out his date Sophie (Sydney Stevenson) is seeing someone else. Meanwhile, Ben is writing a speech for the Central London Dental Association, and very reluctantly has to go to the dentist. He arrives to find his dentist, old mentor Roger Bailey, has died and been replaced by his son Roger Bailey, Jr (Keiron Self), who treats him like a toddler. Guest: Roger Bailey JR
| 28 | 7 | "Waiting to Inhale" | Dewi Humphreys | Fred Barron | 17 October 2002 | 6.16 |
After finding a cannabis cigarette in Michael's bedroom, which he had got from a friend called Bex (Gemma Gregory), Susan and Ben decide to smoke it themselves as an example to their children. However, after their high Ben and Susan realise they have to make up another cigarette using expired parsley, so they can have a word with Michael. Absent: Nick Harper, Janey Harper
| 29 | 8 | "Misery" | Dewi Humphreys | Andrea Solomons | 24 October 2002 | 8.57 |
In a bid to have some fun and relive her own days at University, Susan goes to stay with Janey, much to her surprise. However, Janey is left reeling with embarrassment when Susan starts a food fight in the canteen among other things. Meanwhile, Ben is looking forward to winning a peaceful game of golf with his 90-year-old friend Gerald, but his plans are thrown into chaos when Abi causes him to twist and burn his ankle. He's stuck in his bedroom, unable to move or leave the house, and has to face the likes of Michael who wants to go on a school trip, and Nick whose latest career involves him becoming a female impersonator.
| 30 | 9 | "Auto Erotica" | Dewi Humphreys | Steve Armogida and Jim Armogida | 7 November 2002 | 7.94 |
Susan wants a romantic weekend in Dorset for her and Ben's 26th wedding anniversary. However, after Nick wins an 72 MG Roadster car in a poker game, Ben is more concerned about fixing it up. Also, Michael accidentally ends up with a pair of knickers which belong to Abi, whom he fancies. Absent: Janey Harper
| 31 | 10 | "A Handful of Dust" | Dewi Humphreys | James Hendrie and Ian Brown | 21 November 2002 | 7.82 |
Ben is upset when everyone ignores his birthday, although he told them not to make a fuss. After much pestering from Susan, Janey comes down from university for Ben's birthday, bringing with her a friend called Kate (Catherine Bailey); the two seem to be lesbians. Nick becomes a Gorillagram.
| 32 | 11 | "The Lost Weekend" | Dewi Humphreys | James Hendrie and Ian Brown | 28 November 2002 | 7.23 |
After Michael leaves for a Higher Maths Fun Weekend, Ben and Susan have the house to themselves. Susan's perfect weekend includes looking for antiques and going to the Tate Modern, while Ben's is to relax and do nothing at home or to go to the cinema. Ben tries to teach Susan to relax, but in the end they just end up annoying each other. Absent: Nick Harper, Janey Harper, Abi Harper
| 33 | 12 | "Ghosts" | Dewi Humphreys | Andrea Solomons | 5 December 2002 | 7.68 |
After signing up on oldpals.com, Susan gets a bunch of flowers from Kirk Mason (Michael Simkins), who dumped her 28 years previously, and with Janey's help she gets her revenge on him. Meanwhile, Michael finds out their house is cursed and Abi becomes convinced the house is haunted. Nick becomes an exorcist and a taxi driver.
| 34 | 13 | "One Flew Out of the Cuckoo’s Nest" | Dewi Humphreys | Steve Armogida and Jim Armogida | 12 December 2002 | 7.24 |
Ben finally gets so fed up with Nick after he breaks and sells his record collection that he tells Nick to move out. Nick eventually moves out, much to Susan's horror. He gets a job at Ben's local pub, but he is still not totally independent. Also, Michael tries to get fit for a girl called Julia (Katie Hudson). Absent: Janey Harper
Special
| 35 | S | "Ding Dong Merrily" | Dewi Humphreys | James Hendrie and Ian Brown | 25 December 2002 | 8.57 |
When Janey comes home for Christmas, she's pregnant and Susan wants to know who the father is. However, Janey refuses to tell her, but does tell Ben, who then lies to Susan about the father. Meanwhile, Nick starts a Christmas tree business which crowds the whole living room like a forest and then invites round Mr Bradley (Trevor Peacock), an "old person", for Christmas Day. Also, when Susan cooks the turkey with chocolate and raisins, everyone decides they are vegetarians. Last Episode: Janey Harper (until series 5) Absent: Abi Harper

== Reception ==
=== Viewers ===
The series was once again given a prime-time Friday evening slot, airing regularly at 8:30pm. The first episode of the series gained 8.10 million viewers, a considerably less amount than the second series – however, it was the third highest rating for the week. The third series averaged 7.20 million viewers for each episode.

| Rank | Episode | Viewership | Audience Percentage |
|---|---|---|---|
| 1-2 | Misery; Ding Dong Merrily | 8.57 million | |
| 3 | Shrink Rap | 8.28 million | |
| 4 | Desperately Squeaking Susan | 8.23 million | |
| 5 | The Second Greatest Story Ever Told | 8.14 million | |
| 6 | Of Mice and Ben | 8.12 million | |
| 7 | Absent Vixen, Cheeky Monkey | 8.10 million | |
| 8 | Auto Erotica | 7.94 million | |
| 9 | A Handful of Dust | 7.82 million | |
| 10 | Ghosts | 7.68 million | |
| 11 | Imperfect Strangers | 7.34 million | |
| 12 | One Flew Out of the Cuckoo's Nest | 7.24 million | |
| 13 | The Lost Weekend | 7.23 million | |
| 14 | Waiting to Inhale | 6.16 million | |
