= My Family series 9 =

British television series

My Family
- Series 9
- My Family Series 9 DVD Cover
- No. of episodes: 9 + Christmas Special

Release
- Original network: BBC
- Original release: 2 April – 24 December 2009

Series chronology
- ← Previous; 8 Next → 10

The ninth series of the BBC family sitcom My Family originally aired between 2 April 2009 and 24 December 2009. The series was commissioned following successful ratings from the previous series. The opening episode, "Bully For Ben", re-introduces the six main characters, with the exception of Abi. Kris Marshall (Nick) and Siobhan Hayes (Abi) make a guest appearance in the last episode of the series, "Kenzo's Project". All episodes from the ninth series are thirty minutes long, excluding the Christmas special. The eighth episode of the series, "The Guru", was announced as the 100th episode of the series, and included guest appearances from John Barrowman and David Haig. The series was once again produced by Rude Boy Productions, a company that produces comedies created by Fred Barron. The series was filmed at Pinewood Studios in London, in front of a live audience.

== Episode Information ==
No. overall	No. in series	Title	Directed by	Written by	Original release date	UK viewers (millions)
Series
92	1	"Bully for Ben"	Nic Phillips	Paul Minett and Brian Leveson.	2 April 2009	6.72
It's Ben and Susan's wedding anniversary and Ben is trying to write a loving message in a card but is having serious difficulties, despite fierce prompting from Janey who sets off for the local pub quiz with Michael, Alfie and Roger. Ben is insulted that he wasn't invited but decides to tag along anyway. As their team falls behind in the quiz, Alfie points out that a player on another team has been cheating by texting all night. Ben decides to confront the phone cheat, Barry, who invites him outside to settle their disagreement. Ben backs out of the fight but is determined to get into shape so he can return to confront Barry. Absent: Susan Harper
93	2	"Bringing Up Janey"	Nic Phillips	Amy Shindler	9 April 2009	4.93
Susan is all dressed up for a working lunch with James Garrett. Ben is more than a little jealous, despite Susan's assurances that it's purely a professional relationship. Thinking Susan has forgotten her bag, Ben goes through it and is shocked to find a hotel room key and a note from James. Ben heads straight to the hotel and poses as the hotel manager to get into James' room. He can't believe his eyes when he finds Janey there. It's not long before Ben tells Susan about Janey's new romance. But, surprisingly, she takes the news really well and Ben begins imagining the benefits of gaining a rich son-in-law. Absent: Roger Bailey JR, Kenzo Harper, Alfie Butts
94	3	"A Very Brief Encounter"	Nic Phillips	Steve Armogida and Jim Armogida	16 April 2009	4.69
Susan's old university friend, Margot (Belinda Lang), visits for some support during her divorce. Ben is surprised when Margot reveals how good Susan was at picking men up in her youth and is horrified to find out their sons, Nick and Michael, were named after two of her many ex-boyfriends. Meanwhile, Janey attempts to lift Roger's spirits by assuring him women find him attractive – especially her fictitious Swedish friend, Elke. When Roger learns Swedish and decides he wants to meet Elke, Janey is forced to let him down by faking a call from Elke saying she's moved back to Sweden. All she has to do is persuade someone to be Elke. Absent: Kenzo Harper
95	4	"The Psyche of Mikey"	Nic Phillips	Ed Dyson	19 April 2009	4.48
When Michael announces he's off to see a therapist, Susan is immediately worried there's something terribly wrong, as the comedy continues. Ben is convinced a father-son chat will sort out the problem but Susan's not so sure and heads straight to see the therapist, Dr Twelvetree. When neither Ben nor Susan discover anything about Michael's mental state, they change tactics. While snooping around Michael's room, they find no evidence that he has any problems, that is until Michael comes in and appears to be having a conversation with himself. Absent: Roger Bailey JR, Kenzo Harper
96	5	"A Difficult Undertaking"	Nic Phillips	Andrew Kreisberg	19 April 2009	4.48
Ben's Uncle Norris dies, but the only inheritance he receives is a box of old clothes. Meanwhile, Susan receives ten thousand pounds through the will after the moral support she gave him during and after the death of his wife Mildred. The wake is later held at the Harper's house as it is in a convenient location. However, Ben's purchase of a £60 suit and his general inconsiderate nature leaves him unpopular with everyone. Also, a mix up with Uncle Norris' burial suit and Ben's new suit leads to a winning lottery ticket going missing and a certain group of people going to pay their last respects, which unfortunately results in an embarrassment for the whole family. Absent: Roger Bailey JR, Kenzo Harper
97	6	"Dog Dazed"	Nic Phillips	Steve Armogida and Jim Armogida	23 April 2009	5.14
Susan decides she wants to get a dog so she sets out on trying to convince Ben to get one. Nevertheless, even when he gives in, her over-the-top nature leads to the assessor deeming the family unsuitable for a dog adoption. Later, Susan's depression leads to Ben going to visit the dog kennels in an attempt to get a Susan a dog. However, Susan is already there and has locked herself in a kennel in a protest and has even called the press. To try to sort everything out, Ben goes into the kennel and without him knowing, Susan handcuffs him to one of the bars and leaves him there to deal with the television reporter. Yet things still manage to get worse when Ben sees his cellmate. Absent: Kenzo Harper
98	7	"It's Training Men"	Nic Phillips	Robyn Taylor	30 April 2009	5.15
An undercover assessor for Cavitex, posing as a patient, leads to Ben having to attend a retraining course much to his dismay. The thought of spending a weekend with Roger and a giant bear causes depression to sink in especially when he attends the course but falls asleep and misses everything but the worst is still to come – there is a written exam to be completed and if he fails, he loses his job. However, having failed Ben is still optimistic as he has a plan – he's going to try to bribe the official from Cavitex but money isn't what he wants. Will Ben be able to "go gay" to save his job? Meanwhile, Janey, Michael and Alfie get drunk after drinking Ben's booze. Absent: Susan Harper, Kenzo Harper
99	8	"The Guru"	Nic Phillips	Darin Henry	7 May 2009	5.24
Ben is stunned to discover that successful celebrity dentist, Jeremy Livingston, has dedicated his new book to him, especially because he hasn't got a clue who Jeremy is. Meanwhile, Susan is stranded in an Albanian airport where a handsome stranger comes to her rescue when her bag is stolen. She is instantly smitten with The Doctor, a dashing American, who is heading off on an adventure around the world. The pair connect and he soon asks Susan to join him on his travels. But, could Susan really turn her back on Ben for a lifetime of romance, and could The Doctor really be all that he seems? Guest starring John Barrowman and David Haig. Absent: Janey Harper, Kenzo Harper
100	9	"Kenzo's Project"	Nic Phillips	Tom Anderson and Darin Henry	14 May 2009	4.91
In an attempt to help Kenzo with his school project regarding his family's history, Ben and Susan decide to share the highlights of their past with him. His interest in Uncle Nick leads to Janey and Michael sharing their personal experiences with him but what exactly can Alfie add to the discussion? Meanwhile, Janey and Michael use the project as a way of getting at each other whilst Kenzo becomes the definition of bored. Thoughts and feelings from the past blast back, and the family realise just how much their lives have changed. Roger also contributes to the project by discussing his love life. This episode is a clip show celebrating the 100th episode of the series. Guest Flashback Episode: Nick Harper, Abi Harper Last Ever Episode: Alfie Butts
Special
101	S	"2039: A Christmas Oddity"	Ed Bye	Tom Anderson and David Cantor	24 December 2009	5.59
It's December 2039 and the Harpers gather together to celebrate Christmas. Thirty years in the future, the family's appearance may have changed somewhat but their love/hate relationships are still very much alive. Ben is now in his eighties, a little slower than he used to be but still as grumpy as ever and causing grief for Susan – who, thanks to "a little moisturiser", hasn't aged a bit ("a little moisturiser" may also be an injoke to her guest appearance in Doctor Who). To say that Janey has gained a little weight is an understatement, as she now weighs in at a whopping 20 stone. Michael, meanwhile, is doing a very bad job of hiding his baldness with an unconvincing wig and, following a disastrous trip to the zoo, Roger is now merely a head in a glass dome. Susan is put out by the fact that grandson Kenzo, now 38 years old, hasn't come to visit the family for Christmas Day. Ben is quick to point out that the Harpers have had some of the worst Christmases ever, and the family are reminded of some of their Christmas disasters. Two years stand out in particular – back when they were all a lot younger, and Janey was a lot lighter, the usual arguments over presents were exacerbated by Susan's fun, new game – the Greed Gift Exchange. But, when Kenzo finally arrives, he points out that the year Uncle Richard came to stay was just as traumatic for him.

== Reception ==
=== Viewers ===
The series was given a new, Thursday evening prime-time slot, with the opening episode airing at 8:30pm, with all the following episodes airing at 8:30. To celebrate the 100th episode of My Family, the fourth and fifth episodes were aired as a double-bill in a Sunday evening prime-time slot. The opening episode of the series gained 6.83 million viewers, a consistent improvement on series eight. The ninth series averaged 5.13 million viewers for each episode.

Rank	Episode	Viewership	Audience Percentage
1	Bully for Ben	6.72 million	30.8%
2	2039: A Christmas Oddity	5.59 million	23.5%
3	The Guru	5.24 million	26.1%
4	It's Training Men	5.15 million	25.2%
5	Dog Dazed	5.14 million	25.5%
6	Bringing Up Janey	4.93 million	24.4%
7	Kenzo's Project	4.91 million	23.7%
8	A Very Brief Encounter	4.69 million	21.7%
9	The Psych of Mikey	4.48 million	18.7%
10	A Difficult Undertaking	4.48 million	18.7%
