= My Family series 10 =

10th series of a BBC TV show

My Family
- Series 10
- Series 10 DVD Cover
- No. of episodes: 9 + Christmas Special

Release
- Original network: BBC
- Original release: 9 July – 24 December 2010

Series chronology
- ← Previous; 9 Next → 11

The tenth series of the BBC family sitcom My Family originally aired between 9 July 2010, and 27 August 2010, with a Christmas special that went to air on 24 December 2010. The series was commissioned following consistent ratings from the previous series. The opening episode, "Wheelie Ben", re-introduces the six main characters, with the addition of regular appearances from Kenzo Harper, played by Tayler Marshall. However, the character of Roger Bailey only made an appearance in the series finale. All episodes from the tenth series are thirty minutes in length, with the exception of the Christmas Special. The series was once again produced by Rude Boy Productions, a company that produces comedies created by Fred Barron. Unlike previous series of the show, which were filmed on a yearly basis, both Series 10 and 11 were filmed back-to-back. For the first time in the show's history, two episodes of the series remained unaired for some time. At the time of release, the DVD of the series contained two episodes that had yet to be broadcast on television. On 17 June 2011, one of these two episodes were aired, and the remaining one aired on 22 July 2011. The series averaged 4.55 million per episode; however, they managed to get over 6.00 million viewers for the Christmas Special.

== Episode Information ==
No. overall	No. in series	Title	Directed by	Written by	Original release date	UK viewers (millions)
Series
102	1	"Wheelie Ben"	Ed Bye	Amy Shindler	9 July 2010	4.33
When the local council insists that Ben has a disability problem, they start giving him local cheques in the mail but they do not know that the cheques belong to another Ben Harper. Instead, Ben decides to spend the money on buying Susan expensive shoes and starts to become disabled by fooling a court woman, Rosemary, who nominates him for an award. Meanwhile, Janey and Kenzo give up Janey's teddy and Kenzo's thumb sucking for a bet. Ben soon begins to sink deeper and deeper into his lie, he begins to realise that the truth must come out, but in no way can he predict how the truth is eventually revealed.
103	2	"The Son'll Come Out"	Ed Bye	Tom Anderson	16 July 2010	4.78
Michael is becoming more and more out of control until he comes home drunk one night and blurts out his deepest secret, telling Ben that he's gay. Susan is annoyed that Michael didn't come out to her and for once a supportive Ben outshines Susan's caring nature, but the tables turn when Michael's boyfriend's father goes to the dentist for a check-up. Meanwhile, Janey takes care of an annoying elderly patient, which eventually leads to him dying and leaving Janey his flat, and Michael's boyfriend Scott moves into the Harper residence.
104	3	"Desperately Stalking Susan"	Ed Bye	Brian Leveson and Paul Minett	23 July 2010	4.42
Susan has enlisted the help of older neighbour Martin – whose wife died a few years ago – to do odd jobs around the house. Ben's pleased, and starts getting Martin to do even more jobs. Ben and Susan find themselves at the mercy of a cross-dressing-lunatic... all because Susan receives expensive valentine's gifts that she presumes are from Ben, but aren't, so he goes round to confront Martin, and is shocked to discover his neighbour has made a shrine to Susan. Meanwhile, Janey gets hooked on high-sugar energy drinks, and finds herself in Liverpool.
105	4	"The Melbourne Identity"	Ed Bye	Brian Leveson and Paul Minett	30 July 2010	4.66
Ben and Susan are enjoying the peace and quiet of having the house all to themselves, but this is soon ruined by an Australian Backpacker called Craig, who turns up at the Harper's doorstep. Susan immediately invites him into the house, and he starts doing the jobs that Ben's always put off, much to Ben's annoyance, who just wants the house to himself and Susan. Things soon take a rather sinister twist for Ben when he realises that Craig may be his son, after a night of "fun" with his Mother. Janey soon takes a liking to the new guest and the pair of them go on a date, much to Ben's dismay, Susan then discovers the truth and it transpires that his brief fling happened when he and Susan were dating.
106	5	"He's Just Not That into Ben"	Ed Bye	Dan Staley	6 August 2010	4.89
When Michael returns home from a gay bar drunk, he realises he's forgotten his phone, but Susan insists that he can't go back there in his state – he might get stabbed – so she sends Ben instead. However, he soon grabs the attention of Rupert, who's a little bit too attracted to him, and Ben finds himself getting sent flowers and receiving visits to his house and dental surgery. Only Susan seems to have the power to stop Ben's apparent stalker, and the truth certainly hurts.
107	6	"Slammertime"	Ed Bye	George Jeffrie and Bert Tyler-Moore	13 August 2010	4.70
Susan's going away for the weekend, but is concerned that Ben will just lie on the sofa eating junk food, watching TV and drinking beer. He's adamant that he will do no such thing, and that he will eat the fruit, vegetables and other food that she's left for him. Later on, he's alone in the house, when the police turn up and ask him to be a part of an identity parade. He's very happy to do so, and shows off his moves… but his mood soon drops when he's formally arrested for a mugging! And ends up in a cell with fellow inmates Carl and Terry. On returning home, Ben is enjoying some tranquility… until two familiar faces turn up on his doorstep and his weekend soon turns to anything but the fun and relaxing time he set out to have, especially when Verity, Carl's wife, turns up.
108	7	"Ben Behaving Badly"	Ed Bye	Tom Anderson	27 August 2010	4.09
Janey is due to work, but needs someone to cover for her, because she needs to look after Kenzo and she also wants to keep her job. She asks Michael, who can't because he's too pre-occupied with his split from Scott, then Roger comes round, who's still depressed about Abi. Just wanting some peace, Ben enquires about whether this old man – Harry – has Sky, and when he finds out that he does, he insists that he covers for her. He's quite capable of looking after an old man. Reluctantly, Janey hands over the keys, and his address, but tells Ben that the one thing he mustn't do is let Harry out of his sight. Note: This episode was moved back a week because no episode was aired on 20 August 2010 because of the final of Celebrity Masterchef being aired in its usual 9.00 p.m. slot.
Special
109	S	"Mary Christmas"	Ed Bye	Brian Leveson, Paul Minett & Darin Henry	24 December 2010	6.40
Two stories are placed into one hour long story for this Yuletide offering, which deals with one Christmas tale before tackling the family's New Year's celebrations. And for once, the season of goodwill really seems to be present in the Harper household, with Ben actually throwing himself into the spirit of the holidays. Meanwhile, Susan decides to throw a New Year's Eve party, and hopes it will be better than their archenemy's, Mr Casey. How can she trump him? By hiring Ainsley Harriott to do the catering... Note: Due to the appearance of the late Rolf Harris, it’s likely that this episode has been banned from repeats by both the BBC and UKTV. This Christmas Special has been removed from BBC iPlayer and the 2024 DVD boxset due to the allegations made against Rolf Harris.
