= Gabriel Thomson =

English actor (born 1986)

- Born: Gabriel Francis Marshall-Thomson; 27 October 1986 (age 39); London, England
- Other names: Gabriel Marshall-Thomson; Gabriel Marshall Thomson
- Occupations: Actor; producer
- Years active: 1995–2015, 2020–present

Gabriel Francis Marshall Thomson (born 27 October 1986) is an English actor, best known for his role as Michael Harper in the British situation comedy series My Family.

== Career ==
Thomson began his acting career at the age of four, performing in plays with a company called the Goliards while his family holidayed in Devon. At the age of five, he gave his first TV performance in an advert for Frosties which he later said he would "rather forget." In 1995, he appeared in a television version of The Bible: Joseph. He followed this up with a small role in another television mini-series called Painted Lady.

In 1999, Thomson secured his first major acting role, playing Young Pip in a BBC adaption of Great Expectations. It was through his role on Painted Lady that he was cast in Great Expectations, as the casting director of Painted Lady thought he would be perfect as Pip. The same year, Thomson made his big screen debut, as he had replaced Jonathan Taylor Thomas' live-action and voice role as Pinocchio in The New Adventures of Pinocchio.

From 2000 until 2011, Thomson played Michael Harper in the British BBC sitcom My Family, starring alongside Robert Lindsay, Zoë Wanamaker, Daniela Denby-Ashe and Kris Marshall. He is the only one of the Harper children to have appeared in every series, as Daniela Denby-Ashe left the series in 2002, later returning in 2004, and Kris Marshall left the series in 2005. He is also remembered for acting alongside Jude Law, Rachel Weisz and Ed Harris in the 2001 film Enemy at the Gates as Soviet spy Sasha Filippov.

He was at one time rumoured to play Harry Potter in the series of films based on the popular books by J.K. Rowling; however, just days later Warner Brothers announced that the part was to be portrayed by Daniel Radcliffe.

Thomson portrayed Lysander in A Midsummer Night's Dream and Claudio in Much Ado About Nothing with the British Shakespeare Company on their 2009 tour of the UK, the Republic of Ireland, Norway and the Czech Republic. He also starred in the British film 13Hrs.

In 2010, Thomson joined the cast of GB Theatre Company, playing Orlando in As You Like It and Dr Caius in The Merry Wives of Windsor. The tour included the Republic of Ireland, Norway, the Czech Republic and the UK.

Thomson also starred in the film The Lost Choices, released by Metrodome in the UK on 14 September 2015.

On 20 August 2015, Thomson had announced on his Facebook page that he was leaving acting to return to university, and on 15 September the Daily Mirror reported that he was to attend King's College in London for three years to study for a degree in philosophy, with the aim of becoming a human rights lawyer.

In 2020, he returned to acting, starring in the film A Little More Flesh.

== Personal life ==
Thomson attended Elliott School in Putney.

== Filmography ==
Year	Title	Role	Notes
1995	Joseph	Ephraim	Miniseries (1 episode)
1997	Painted Lady	Young Sebastian	Miniseries
1999	Great Expectations	Young Pip	TV movie
1999	The New Adventures of Pinocchio	Pinocchio	Feature film
2000–2011	My Family	Michael Harper	Series 1–11 (main role, 114 episodes)
2001	Enemy at the Gates	Sacha Filipov	Feature film, credited as Gabriel Marshall-Thomson
2010	13Hrs	Charlie Moore	Feature film (a.k.a. Night Wolf)
2014	The Lost Choices	Adam Grainger	Feature film
2020	A Little More Flesh	Leon Decker	Feature film
2023	The Score	The Taker	Short film
2024	Hungry Like the Wolf	Adam	Short film
