= My Family series 6 =

My Family
- Series 6
- My Family Series 6 DVD Cover
- No. of episodes: 7 + Christmas Special

Release
- Original network: BBC
- Original release: 10 March – 25 December 2006

Series chronology
- ← Previous; 5 Next → 7

The sixth series of the BBC family sitcom My Family originally aired between 10 March 2006 and 25 December 2006. The series was commissioned following consistently high ratings from the previous series. The opening episode, "Bliss For Idiots", re-introduces the six main characters, with the addition of Alfie Butts, played by Rhodri Meilir. All episodes from the sixth series are thirty minutes long, excluding The series was once again produced by Rude Boy Productions, a company that produces comedies created by Fred Barron. The series was filmed at Pinewood Studios in London, in front of a live audience.

== Episode Information ==
No. overall	No. in series	Title	Directed by	Written by	Original release date	UK viewers (millions)
Series
66	1	"Bliss for Idiots"	Dewi Humphreys	Paul Minett and Brian Leveson.	10 March 2006	7.17
Ben is unhappy with his patients, as they seem to be all lower class rough non-private money-grabbing peasants, but is even less happy with Susan's book-writing houseguest who is the complete opposite. Dr Buck, is the kind of person you would cross the street to avoid, in Ben's eyes, but to Susan he is nearing on a God – a God of self-help. However, when he comes to stay with them Ben soon begins to discover that perhaps Dr Buck's calm tranquillity isn't quite what it seems, and Susan soon finds another side to him. Ben's latest patient suggests that he joins his secret organisation as it may have the answer. Also, Roger speaks Welsh to Abi and Alfie joins in. Absent: Janey Harper, Kenzo Harper
67	2	"The Spokes Person"	Dewi Humphreys	Paul Minett, Brian Leveson, Bert Tyler-Moore, George Jeffrie and Tess Morris	17 March 2006	7.42
Ben starts a one-man anti-cycling campaign, which causes chaos in the household. He also appears on a radio show in an attempt to get people to support him however; all he manages to do is aggravate the whole cyclist population of London and have his house egged. Meanwhile, Susan makes a great effort towards her fund-raising idea by getting Michael to take photos of semi-naked men to form a calendar. Unfortunately she doesn't check the pictures before sending them off to the printers. Also, Roger takes Abi to see Gordon Ramsay but to everybody else's misfortune she has picked up some new cooking phrases. Absent: Kenzo Harper
68	3	"Dentally Unstable"	Dewi Humphreys	Andrea Solomons	31 March 2006	6.41
With Ben away on a two-week conference, Janey starts an affair with a replacement dentist whose charm captivates the rest of the females in the Harper household. When Susan attempts to put a stop to the new dentist and Janey he simply flatters her so she returns happy. Next its Grace's turn but even she finds it hard to ignore his flattering one-liners. Even Abi is under to his spell to Roger's disgust. Meanwhile, Michael's latest scam involves the aid of everyone, but will they help him out? Alfie's reluctance to get involved causes Michael to threaten him with an ultimatum – either he takes part or he will tell every one what he looks at on the internet. Absent: Ben Harper, Kenzo Harper
69	4	"Living the Dream"	Dewi Humphreys	Tom Leopold	7 April 2006	6.28
Ben and Susan join a pyramid selling scheme on Roger's advice even though he didn't receive any of his money through the scheme. Upon asking Michael's advice, he says don't touch it but Ben and Susan know better, don't they? Meanwhile, Roger buys himself some special treats and Ben finds himself getting extremely jealous as he cannot shift any of his stock. When Roger buys himself a convertible, Ben finds himself questioning Roger's profits or rather, from whence they came. Also the family is suffering from the effects of a broken boiler, occasional power cuts and Ben's dreams of having a champagne breakfast for the first time in his life. Absent: Alfie Butts
70	5	"An Embarrassment of Susans"	Dewi Humphreys	Steve Armogida and Jim Armogida	14 April 2006	6.10
Ben buys the house next door to help with the family finances, but ends up involved in a "squatter's rights" dilemma but its alright. Perhaps he should just palm it off on Roger – that sounds fair, doesn't it? However, when Susan finds out she demands that Ben should help Roger get his house back, so Ben, Roger and Alfie break in only to find out that it is Style Squad, a television show. Meanwhile, Susan tries to fix Michael up with a new girlfriend called Suzanne, but the similarity is not limited to the name. However, Michael cannot see the similarity but Ben can and it appears to be scarring him ever so slightly. Absent: Kenzo Harper
71	6	"And Other Animals"	Dewi Humphreys	Tom Leopold	21 April 2006	6.17
With Nick still away, Michael joining the Army, and Janey getting her stuff out of the attic, Susan is feeling deserted. Even Ben and Alfie don't seem to be a comfort. However, a stray dog offers a little comfort but unfortunately it becomes man's best friend however, perhaps it shouldn't have chosen Ben as that man. Meanwhile, Michael attempts to hide his entire platoon in the attic, Ben attempts to get a priceless teddy bear back from the charity shop after donating it by accident and somebody is about to have a spout of bad luck and amazingly it isn't Ben. Also, somebody's looking for Michael, and all his comrades. Absent: Kenzo Harper
72	7	"The Art of Being Susan"	Dewi Humphreys	Paul Minett and Brian Leveson.	28 April 2006	6.22
With Ben away again, a wealthy art collector called James Garrett invites Susan to dinner after her boss tells her to do anything to sell art. After contemplating taking him to Alton Towers, she decides to let him make the move with a little nudging. Meanwhile her mother, Grace, is gathering a collection of her own but only appears to be collecting men – however she misjudges how deaf one of them is and ends up losing them all. Also, Roger is summoning up the courage to pop the question to Abi, it's just a shame that she can't see where his continuous stuttering is leading. When Roger finally does pop the question, Abi faints. Absent: Ben Harper, Kenzo Harper
Special
73	S	"The Heart of Christmas"	Dewi Humphreys	Paul Minett and Brian Leveson.	25 December 2006	5.09
Ben pretends to be ill to get out of Christmas, but when Susan insists he go to the doctor, they decide to run tests because of high blood pressure. Ben then enjoys his private room, but he is soon sent to a NHS ward, as it is soon discovered that his private health insurance has expired. The tests reveal that he needs an operation and during this he dreams that Susan is God. Meanwhile Abi, who is now engaged to Roger, wants a baby, Janey is having problems getting Kenzo's Christmas present and Alfie makes a special brew which he tells Michael will make them irresistible to women. Guest starring Roy Heather, Jeremy Child and Clive Russell.

== Reception ==
=== Viewers ===
The series was once again given a Friday evening prime-time slot, with most episodes being aired at 8:30pm. The opening episode of the series gained 7.17 million viewers, becoming the second most watched programme of the week. The sixth series averaged 6.35 million viewers for each episode.

Rank	Episode	Viewership	Audience Percentage
1	The Spokes Person	7.42 million	
2	Bliss for Idiots	7.17 million	
3	Dentally Unstable	6.41 million	
4	Living the Dream	6.28 million	
5	The Art of Being Susan	6.22 million	
6	And Other Animals	6.17 million	
7	An Embarrassment of Susans	6.10 million	
8	The Heart of Christmas	5.09 million	
