= My Family =

British TV sitcom (2000–2011)

- Title card (2009–2011)
- Genre: Sitcom
- Created by: Fred Barron
- Directed by: Baz Taylor; Jay Sandrich; Dewi Humphreys; Nic Phillips; Ed Bye
- Starring: Robert Lindsay; Zoë Wanamaker; Kris Marshall; Daniela Denby-Ashe; Gabriel Thomson; Siobhan Hayes; Keiron Self; Rhodri Meilir; Tayler Marshall
- Opening theme: "My Family"
- Composer: Graham Jarvis
- Country of origin: United Kingdom
- Original language: English
- No. of series: 11
- No. of episodes: 120 (+ 1 short) (list of episodes)

Production
- Executive producers: Donald Taffner Jr. Geoffrey Perkins (2000–01); Fred Barron (2000–08); Sophie Clarke-Jervoise (2002–04); Ian Brown (2003–04); James Hendrie (2003–04); Tom Leopold (2006); Michael Jacob (2006–09); Tom Anderson (2007–11)
- Producer: John Bartlett
- Production locations: Chiswick, London, England
- Running time: 113x 30 minutes 3x 50 minutes 4x 60 minutes
- Production companies: Rude Boy Productions; DLT Entertainment

Original release
- Network: BBC One
- Release: 19 September 2000 – 2 September 2011

Related
- After You've Gone

My Family is a British sitcom created and initially co-written by Fred Barron, which was produced by DLT Entertainment and Rude Boy Productions, and broadcast by BBC One for eleven series between 2000 and 2011, with Christmas specials broadcast from 2002 onwards. My Family was voted 24th in the BBC's "Britain's Best Sitcom" in 2004 and was the most-watched sitcom in the United Kingdom in 2008. As of 2011, it is one of only twelve British sitcoms to pass the 100-episode mark. In April 2020, BBC One began airing the series from the first episode in an 8 pm slot on Friday nights; along with this, all 11 series were made available on BBC iPlayer.

The show chronicles the lives of the Harpers, a fictional middle-class British family. Set in Chiswick in west London, it stars Robert Lindsay and Zoë Wanamaker as husband and wife Ben and Susan Harper, with Kris Marshall, Daniela Denby-Ashe and Gabriel Thomson as their children Nick, Janey and Michael.

== Background ==
In 1999, Fred Barron was considering producing a British sitcom the same way sitcoms were produced in the U.S. My Family was to feature a group of writers in a writers' room rather than the standard one or two, something that had been attempted in the UK with shows including Goodnight Sweetheart and On the Buses, but was nevertheless atypical. My Family was consciously designed to have wide appeal, featuring characters with whom viewers could build relationships similar to the earlier BBC sitcom 2point4 Children which was also concentrated around a family unit.

The show chronicles the lives of the Harpers, a fictional middle-class British family who live at 78 Lancaster Road, Chiswick, London. Dentist Ben and his wife Susan, a tour guide who later works for an art gallery, have three children: Nick, Janey, and Michael, who complicate their lives. Susan is a control freak, but Ben prefers to leave the children to it and stay as uninvolved as possible. Janey later goes to University, but drops out and moves back in later, while Nick finally gets his own place.

Mainly focusing on Ben and Susan, the show featured sub-stories ranging from Nick's schemes to Abi and Roger's love life. It is described as a "dysfunctional family"-style sitcom; however, many of the episodes feature the family working together to get one another out of trouble. Nick's bizarre jobs became a major feature of the first four series. After the departure of Nick, more prominence was given to Abi and Roger's love life, Michael's misadventures, Janey's endless list of boyfriends, and Alfie's dream of musical stardom.

The show saw considerable development and change in its characters' lives, seeing Janey turn from teenage rebel to loving mother, Nick turn from slacker to a mature adult, Abi marry Roger, and Michael go through and beyond his school days. Meanwhile, Ben remained the same grumpy dentist, Susan remained the same control freak, and Alfie remained the same slow-witted lodger.

== Cast and characters ==
The main characters in My Family are parents Ben and Susan Harper. They have three children, Nick, Janey and Michael. Nick is a regular character until the 2003 Christmas special, and makes one appearance in 2004's fifth series before making his final My Family appearance in the 2005 Comic Relief short as actor Kris Marshall wanted to do other projects and avoid being type-cast. Janey is a regular until the 2002 Christmas special and does not appear in series four (2003), while the character is at university. Janey returns as a main character in series five.

Abi Harper first appears in series three as the daughter of Ben's cousin Richard. Series three also sees the first appearance of Roger Bailey, Jnr. Roger, who becomes a main character in the fourth series, is a dentist and the son of Ben's former mentor. In the 2005 Christmas special Alfie Butts, a friend of Nick's, moves into the Harper household.

My Family features several recurring characters. Series one features Daisy Donovan as Ben's dental assistant, Brigitte. In the second series "Stupid" Brian appears as Janey's boyfriend. Series four features Michael's girlfriend Fiona. That series also sees the introduction of Michael's friend Hubert and Susan's mother Grace Riggs, who both appear in subsequent series until series seven. A minor recurring character from the 2006 Christmas special to series seven is Denis, the local Vicar. In addition, Mr. Alexander Casey, the Harpers' neighbour, appears in three episodes, "Driving Miss Crazy" (2001), "Neighbour Wars" (2008), and "Mary Christmas" (2010)

=== Overview ===
Character	Played by	Series											Episode count
Character	Played by	1	2	3	4	5	6	7	8	9	10	11	Episode count
Ben Harper	Robert Lindsay												117
Susan Harper	Zoë Wanamaker												115
Nick Harper	Kris Marshall												45
Janey Harper	Daniela Denby-Ashe												94
Michael Harper	Gabriel Thomson												114
Abi Harper	Siobhan Hayes												57
Roger Bailey	Keiron Self												59
Alfie Butts	Rhodri Meilir												31
Kenzo Harper	Tayler Marshall												23

=== Main characters ===
- Robert Lindsay (2000–11) portrays Ben Harper. Ben Harper is an overly-misanthropic and cynical dentist. When he is not at work sacking another assistant or trying to avoid fellow-dentist Roger, he is at home trying to relax (which never works). Ben isn't a bad man; behind his sardonic exterior he does really love his family and has to put up with being bossed about and manipulated by his wife Susan and continually fleeced for money by his children. Ben also hates Christmas, which is never explained.
- Zoë Wanamaker (2000–11) portrays Susan Harper. Susan Harper is a control freak and very good at getting her way. She is constantly worried about her three children and often forces Ben to go out of his way to monitor or look after them. Susan is a tour guide but seems to spend most of her time at home. She is a terrible cook. This is a homage to Butterflies, in which the male lead is also a dentist called Ben and the rest of the family often have to sneak the food she has prepared into the bin without her noticing.
- Kris Marshall (2000–05) portrays Nick Harper. Nick Harper is the oldest sibling. He is a layabout who is constantly changing jobs – a self-employed stuntman one minute, a gorilla-o-gram the next, at one point a sperm-donor. Extremely laid-back, Nick cannot be trusted to look after money or handle important tasks. He was last seen moving into his own flat, and from phone conversations Ben and Susan have with him, he seems to be coping with living on his own.
- Daniela Denby-Ashe (2000–02; 2004–11) portrays Janey Harper. Fashion-conscious, money-loving, boy-mad Janey spends all her time on the phone, switching boyfriends, or pestering Ben for shopping money. Whilst at Manchester University (spending yet more of her dad's money) Janey got pregnant. She was expelled and returned home to once again take advantage of her parents. Susan does not seem to mind, as it means she now has Kenzo Harper to look after.
- Gabriel Thomson (2000–11) portrays Michael Harper. Michael (or "Mikey" as Ben calls him) is Susan and Ben's youngest, a smart, geeky adolescent. He looks down on his family, thinking he is more sensible than the rest of them put together, and often ends up getting them out of trouble. Since starting university he has experimented with bleached hair and piercings. In series 10 Michael comes out and tells his family that he is gay; he is relieved when they accept this.
- Siobhan Hayes (2002–08) portrays Abi Harper. Abi moved into the Harper household in the third series. She is Ben's first cousin once removed, very clumsy and very dim, and often seen telling off Ben or Susan. When she finally realized that Roger was madly in love with her, they married in series seven, but she later left him to become a nun.
- Keiron Self (2002–11) portrays Roger Bailey. Roger is the over-enthusiastic dentist who works in the same building as Ben. He often turns up at the Harper household uninvited and proceeds to unintentionally annoy Ben. For a long period Roger was trying to build up the courage to ask Abi out. They were, after all, ideally suited – like Abi, Roger possesses no common sense and is gullible. Eventually they did marry but have since split as Abi has decided to become a nun. He's now a part-time policeman as well a dentist.
- Rhodri Meilir (2005–09) portrays Alfie Butts. Alfie is a friend of Nick's who turned up at the Harper household at Christmas 2005. Alfie comes from a small community in Wales which, based on his stories, has some rather backwards traditions. Also, there weren't many girls where he came from, so he savors spending time at the Harpers' and meeting Michael's friends. Most of the family have turned to him at various times for advice. He's a struggling musician who is very laid-back about life despite not having a home or a steady income. He did not appear in the 2009 Christmas special and was completely absent from the whole of series 10 and 11, with no explanation.
- Tayler Marshall (2006–11; character introduced in 2003) portrays Kenzo Harper. Kenzo is the youngest member of the Harper household, son of Janey, grandson of Ben and Susan and nephew of Michael and Nick. Even at such a young age, he's shown a massive intelligence which at times even rivals, and at times even beats, Michael's. At the end of series nine, he has done a project about his family and he tells them his teachers want him to see a psychologist. As portrayed by Tayler Marshall, Kenzo bears a striking resemblance to his uncle Nick (Kris Marshall). Before becoming Kenzo in 2006, Tayler Marshall portrayed a guest at Kenzo's third-birthday party in 2005.

=== Other characters ===
- Daisy Donovan portrays Brigitte McKay, Ben Harper's dental assistant for the entire first series. She was known for her unique way of thinking and living, and often tried to offer Ben and his patients spiritual guidance. She often forgot to take phone messages for Ben and irritated him while he worked. She and Nick appeared to be attracted to each other.
- Chloe Bale portrays Sasha, Janey's best friend in series 8–11. Storylines focused on the pair getting into trouble (usually instigated by Sasha). She was disliked by Ben, then by Janey until they became friends again.
- Maxine an unseen character was Janey's best friend from school. Although she was never seen, it was hinted that Maxine was very much like Janey: popular, and fashion-conscious. Janey once admitted to Susan that she hung out with Maxine because Maxine's alleged "ugliness" made Janey look more beautiful. Janey was also jealous that Maxine's parents treated her with expensive designer labels. It is unknown if they kept in touch.
- Rosemary Leach portrays Grace Riggs, Susan Harper's mother, known for her addiction to alcohol, especially martinis. She and Susan have a cold relationship, and are locked in a constant psychological battle. Grace has had various boyfriends in the show and was the one who told Ben that Susan was married before she married him. She likes to make Susan feel guilty for not visiting her and often uses deceitful tactics to lure her over. Her own late mother, Mary, owned a highly-successful brothel in London's West End. She first appeared in series two, played by Avril Elgar and credited as "Rebecca" (although she was not referred to by name in the episode). She did not reappear until Leach took up the role in series four. It was announced in the episode "A Decent Proposal" that she had died.
- Kevin Bishop portrays Stupid Brian, Janey's boyfriend in the show's second series when he and Janey were still at school but he was getting into decorating. Although he lived up to the nickname 'Stupid Brian,' he was surprising apt at building a bookshelf for the Harpers' kitchen.
- Alex Dawson portrays Hubert, Michael's best friend (it's unknown whether they're still in touch). Hubert was known for being very square but very smart. He once created a television remote that could gain 'free' access channels that required PINs for them.
- Andy Taylor portrays Hotel Receptionist, appearing in five episodes. He appears in different hotels across the country as a hotel receptionist. Each time he encountered the Harper family he became more familiar with their dysfunctional antics. He once suspected that Susan was an escort and that Ben had a mistress.
- Nickolas Grace portrays Mr. Casey, the Harpers' next-door neighbour, although he doesn't get along with them. Viewers first met him as a recent widower who had adopted a dog and named her Gemma. He also tried to scam Ben for money after Ben ran over this dog.
- Rachel Hyde-Harvey portrays Fiona, Michael's girlfriend throughout the fourth series. She and Michael are caught in bed together but never had sex. They are also caught kissing in the airing cupboard, and in another scene they begin to take their clothes off but Susan is listening and says they should stop.
- Nathan Brine portrays Scott Marsh in series 10. Scott is Michael's first boyfriend. In his first appearance, Ben accidentally outed him to his homophobic father and he was forced to leave home. Susan invited him to live at the house, but Michael and Scott moved into a new flat instead. A few episodes later, it was revealed that Scott and Michael had split up, although they got back together in the same episode.

=== Guest cast ===
My Family has used several actors from various past hit sitcoms, most notably David Haig from The Thin Blue Line, Belinda Lang of 2point4 Children, Diana Weston (Robert Lindsay's former long-term partner) from The Upper Hand who portrayed a trans woman named Charlie, Pauline Quirke of Birds of a Feather played a bank robber (whilst her husband in Birds of a Feather was a bank robber), and Sam Kelly from On the Up.

- Anna Crilly
- John Barrowman
- David Haig
- Beatriz Batarda
- Kevin Bishop
- Barbara Keogh
- Belinda Lang
- Rosemary Leach
- Sylvestra Le Touzel
- Peter Capaldi
- Frances Barber
- Anne Robinson
- Sally Bretton
- Trevor Peacock
- Jan Francis
- Gerard Horan
- Michael Obiora
- Preeya Kalidas
- Christopher Ryan
- Daisy Donovan
- Vicki Pepperdine
- Mac McDonald
- Emma Amos
- Nickolas Grace
- Andy Taylor
- Rolf Harris
- Jamie Foreman
- Anthony Head
- Danny Webb
- Anna Chancellor
- Ben Jones
- Eric Sykes
- Lucy Punch
- Pauline Quirke
- Perry Benson
- Diana Weston
- Lorraine Chase
- Jeremy Clyde
- Richard Whiteley
- Robert Webb
- Edna Doré
- Sam Kelly
- Morgana Robinson
- Paul Bown
- Ainsley Harriott
- Russ Abbot
- Clive Rowe
- Jay Simon
- John Challis
- Nathaniel Parker
- Julian Clary
- Rupert Vansittart
- Victoria Wicks
- Tony Selby
- Rupert Evans
- Clive Russell

== Episodes ==
Series
Series	Episodes	Originally released	
Series	Episodes	First released	Last released
1	8	19 September 2000	7 November 2000
2	13	31 August 2001	30 November 2001
3	13	6 September 2002	12 December 2002
3	Special	25 December 2002	
4	13	21 March 2003	13 June 2003
4	Special	25 December 2003	
5	14	12 March 2004	18 June 2004
5	Specials	24 December 2004	25 December 2005
6	7	10 March 2006	28 April 2006
6	Special	25 December 2006	
7	9	6 April 2007	8 June 2007
7	Special	26 December 2007	
8	7	11 April 2008	23 May 2008
8	Special	24 December 2008	
9	9	2 April 2009	14 May 2009
9	Special	24 December 2009	
10	9	9 July 2010	27 August 2010
10	Special	24 December 2010	
11	9	1 July 2011	2 September 2011

The first episode aired on 19 September 2000, with the final episode on 2 September 2011. 120 episodes, including ten specials, were broadcast as well as one Comic Relief short.

The BBC and UKTV refuse to re-broadcast the series four episode "Blind Justice", due to the receipt of 4 complaints (from a viewing public of 12m). Although no reason was given, it is likely that was considered offensive to blind people. This episode is banned from British TV, but it is still on BBC iPlayer, the series four UK DVD release and has been screened on BBC America. However it is likely that the 2010 Christmas episode, "Mary Christmas", will never be repeated on British TV or added to BBC iPlayer, as it features a guest appearance from Rolf Harris. However, it is still on the 5 Christmas Specials UK DVD release.

The episodes are recorded in front of a live audience in Pinewood Studios, Iver, Buckinghamshire, except where the set used is too large, this is then filmed, and played out to an invited audience 'as-live'. Series 1 was recorded at BBC Television Centre in London. Also, the show, unlike most British sitcoms but in common with most American television comedies, has no location footage. Scenes taking place outdoors were actually sets.

The series was scripted by a team of writers, following the American model. Historically, British sitcoms were more generally written by one or two writers. By employing a wider number of writers to brainstorm jokes for each episode, DLT Entertainment UK Ltd, the production company, was able to maintain a consistent and relatively long-lived product without having to wait for a single writer to produce more material.

=== Opening sequence ===
At the start of the first two series, it slides across four boxes with each character's face in them. The first box stands alone with Ben and Susan in it. The other three are lapped over each other with a photo of Michael, Janey and Nick from left to right in them. While it slides across at the start, each character's face turns with Janey and Nick smiling and the others being fairly plain faced. Once the boxes are placed, the boxes with youngsters in them drop to the bottom of the screen and are replaced with the show's logo.

At the start of the third series, four rectangle blocks fall onto a completely white screen to create Ben's face. Those blocks are then replaced with blocks that create Susan's face; each block then shows different parts of the other characters to finally reveal Nick's face. It continues to do this for Janey, Michael and (starting from the fourth episode entitled "Of Mice and Ben") the new character to the show Abi. Abi's (for the first three episodes, Michael's) face then falls into the bottom right corner while the previous faces spread across to other places of the white screen. It reveals that Nick, Janey and Michael are next to Abi and Ben and Susan are with each other at the top left of the screen. The logo fades on the top right of the screen.

The fourth series is similar to the third series opening sequence. Only difference is that the photo of each character is changed, each block does not show different parts of each character when it transitions; instead it transitions in various styles, for example in an opening in a window blind style. Series five titles still remain similar; the photos are changed again and there are eleven rectangles instead of four. Nick is almost completely absent from the opening titles in series five except in episode six of series five titled "My Will Be Done"; he was missing in some episodes from series four and a few from series three.

The series six opening titles have cut-outs of each character, as they fade into the white screen and zoom in and out and eventually stop moving. The line-up from left to right is Abi, Michael, Susan, Ben, Janey and Roger. The titles remain the same for series seven and eight; the one difference is that Janey's clothes are changed. In series nine, the line-up changes due to Abi's departure at the end of the previous series. Her place is taken by Alfie, who has been a regular since series six but never appeared in the titles until the ninth series. Starting in the 2009 Christmas Special, Alfie has been replaced by Kenzo.

== Writers ==
The first writer for the series was its creator, Fred Barron with British writer, Penny Croft. Barron wrote eight episodes up until the fourth series. Other major writers include James Hendrie and Ian Brown who wrote numerous episodes, including the first episode together up until the 2004 Christmas Special. Steven and Jim Armogida are the only writers to remain on the show throughout its run. Writers such as Sophie Hetherington, Georgia Pritchett, James Cary and Tess Morris have all written at least one episode for the sitcom at one point. None of these writers have written more than five episodes. Andrea Solomons has written many episodes for My Family, she wrote from the second series to the sixth series. Meanwhile, Darin Henry has written one episode for the fifth series before returning for the eighth series onwards.

Paul Minett and Brian Leveson were the sitcom's last main writers. Credited for most of the specials, at least three episodes from every series since 2005. Bert-Tyler Moore and George Jeffrie both have written a few episodes for the sitcom in its sixth and seventh series and returned for series ten. Tom Leopold wrote two episodes for the sixth series only. Tom Anderson, the series' last executive producer and showrunner, wrote his first episode for series seven and wrote until series ten, but remained showrunner for series eleven. Ed Dyson and David Cantor have written episodes for the seventh, eighth, ninth and eleventh series.

Writer	Year(s)	Episodes
James Hendrie; Ian Brown	2000–2004	27 (inc. 2 co-written)
Fred Barron	2000–2003	8 (inc. 4 co-written)
Shawn Schepps	2000	1 (inc. 1 co-written)
Penny Croft	2000	1 (inc. 1 co-written)
Andrea Solomons	2001–2006	12 (inc. 1 co-written)
Sophie Hetherington	2002–2004	3 (inc. 2 co-written)
Georgia Pritchett	2003	1
James Cary	2004	1
Darin Henry	2004; 2008–2011	8 (inc. 2 co-written)
George Jeffrie; Bert-Tyler Moore	2006–2007; 2010–2011	4 (inc. 1 co-written)
Tess Morris	2006	1 (inc. 1 co-written)
Tom Leopold	2006	2
Steve Armogida; Jim Armogida	2000–2010	24 (inc. 1 co-written)
Paul Minett; Brian Leveson	2005–2010	13 (inc. 2 co-written)
Tom Anderson	2007–2011	8 (inc. 2 co-written)
Ed Dyson	2007–2009; 2011	5
David Cantor	2007–2009; 2011	5 (inc. 1 co-written)
Amy Shindler	2009–2010	2
Andrew Kreisberg	2009–2010	2
Robin Taylor	2009; 2011	2
Dan Staley	2010	1

=== Show runners ===
- Fred Barron (2000–2003)
- Ian Brown & James Hendrie (2004–2005)
- Tom Leopold (2006)
- Tom Anderson (2007–2011)

== Reception ==
=== Critical reception ===
Initially, the show received a poor critical response, and many dismissed its humour as mundane and dated. In spite of this, the programme received above average audience ratings, and further series were commissioned, with critical approval gradually improving as the series progressed. Bruce Dessau, writing on the 100th episode, noted that it was a comedy that "the critics hate, but the public love", on the basis of ratings.

Zoë Wanamaker said in 2007 that she was no longer happy with the quality of the writing, claiming she and co-star Robert Lindsay even refused to film one episode because it was so poor. In May 2009, the two stars revealed they were still unhappy with the writing quality, with Lindsay stating "There's some real dross (in the scripts) and we're aware of it". He later admitted that the eleventh series might be the last stating "As far as Zoë (Wanamaker) and I are concerned, we will do a tenth series of 16 episodes, which the BBC will probably split into a tenth and eleventh, then that will be it."

In 2004, the show came 24th in Britain's Best Sitcom.

=== Ratings ===
Series	Timeslot	# Ep	First aired		Last aired		Avg. viewers (millions)
Series	Timeslot	# Ep	Date	Viewers (millions)	Date	Viewers (millions)	Avg. viewers (millions)
1	Tuesday 8:30 pm (1–4); Tuesday 8:00 pm (5–6); Monday 8:30 pm (7–8)	8	19 September 2000	8.84	7 November 2000	7.62	7.09
2	Friday 8:30 pm	13	31 August 2001	8.94	30 November 2001	11.15	10.45
3	Friday 8:30 pm (1–4); Thursday 8:00 pm (5–13)	13	6 September 2002	8.10	12 December 2002	7.24	7.76
4	Friday 8:30 pm	13	21 March 2003	8.77	13 June 2003	6.61	8.32
5	Friday 8:30 pm (1–12); Friday 9:00 pm (13)	13	12 March 2004	9.17	18 June 2004	5.62	6.75
6	Friday 8:30 pm	7	10 March 2006	7.17	28 April 2006	6.22	6.54
7	Friday 8:30 pm	9	6 April 2007	6.65	8 June 2007	4.84	5.90
8	Friday 9.00 pm (1); Friday 9.30 pm (2–7)	7	11 April 2008	5.56	23 May 2008	4.74	5.14
9	Thursday 8.30 pm (1–2, 5); Thursday 8.00 pm (3–4, 6–9)	9	2 April 2009	6.72	14 May 2009	4.91	5.08
10	Friday 9.00 pm	7	9 July 2010	4.33	27 August 2010	4.09	4.55
11	Friday 9.00 pm (1–10); Friday 8.30 pm (11)	11	17 June 2011	4.42	2 September 2011	3.89	3.94

Note: The tenth series features nine episodes, but the final two did not originally air with the series and were held over and included within the eleventh series, therefore, for the purpose of listing average ratings, the two episodes will appear in the ratings table for the eleventh series as they aired in that year.

=== Awards and nominations ===
Year	Ceremony	Category	Nominee(s)	Result	Ref.
2002	BAFTA Television Awards	Best Comedy Performance	Robert Lindsay	Nominated	
2002	BAFTA Television Awards	Lew Grade Award	My Family	Nominated	
2002	British Comedy Awards	Best Comedy Newcomer	Kris Marshall	Won	
2002	Royal Television Society Awards	Team Award	My Family	Nominated	
2003	BAFTA Television Awards	Best Situation Comedy	My Family	Nominated	
2003	National Television Awards	Most Popular Comedy Performer	Robert Lindsay	Nominated	
2003	National Television Awards	Most Popular Comedy Programme	My Family	Won	
2003	TV Quick Awards	Best Comedy Show	My Family	Won	
2004	National Television Awards	Most Popular Comedy Programme	My Family	Nominated	
2005	Golden Rose Awards	Best Sitcom Actress	Zoë Wanamaker	Won	
2006	National Television Awards	Most Popular Comedy Programme	My Family	Nominated	
2007	National Television Awards	Most Popular Comedy Programme	My Family	Nominated	
2007	TV Quick Awards	Best Comedy Show	My Family	Won	
2008	National Television Awards	Most Popular Comedy Programme	My Family	Nominated	
2008	TV Quick Awards	Best Comedy Show	My Family	Nominated	
2009	Golden Rose Awards	Sitcom	My Family	Won	
2009	TV Quick Awards	Best Comedy Show	My Family	Nominated	

== Cancellation ==
BBC One controller Danny Cohen, when commenting on the decision to axe the series, said "Now that all the Harper children have flown the nest we feel it's time to make room for new comedies". Robert Lindsay said in an interview with The Daily Telegraph: "I'm amazed by the public's love for the series [...] When Kris Marshall left in 2005 I was convinced that was it. But somehow Zoë and I have kept the essence of it together."

== DVD releases ==
All episodes are available on DVD in the UK. Each of the eleven series were released on DVD both individually and as a box set in the UK, minus the Christmas specials. On 20 November 2006, Christmas 2002 – 2005 was released on DVD, followed by Christmas 2006 – 2010 on 5 December 2011. In Canada and the United States series one to four are available on Region 1 DVD. In Australia Series one to seven are available on Region 4 DVD. A box set containing Series one to five was released on 7 April 2011 in Australia. In the UK, series 1, series 2 and series 3 were released on DVD by Video Collection International, series 4 was released on DVD by 2 Entertain and series 5, series 6, the four (2002, 2003, 2004 and 2005) Christmas specials, series 7, series 8, series 9, series 10, series 11 and the five (2006, 2007, 2008, 2009 and 2010) Christmas specials were released on DVD by both 2 Entertain and BBC Video. Series eight was released on 6 October 2011 in Australia. Series 9 was released 3 November 2011 in Australia. Series 10 was released 3 May 2012 in Australia. A box set containing Series 6 to 10 was released 7 November 2012 in Australia. In Australia as of 20 August 2019, Series 11 and both Christmas Specials have not been released in Region 4.

Standard sets
Series	Release date			Features
Series	Region 1	Region 2	Region 4	Features
1	10 October 2006	22 March 2004	3 January 2007	8 episodes; 1 disc; BBFC rating: PG; ACB rating: PG
2	10 October 2006	7 June 2004	5 September 2007	13 episodes; 2 discs; BBFC rating: 12; ACB rating: PG
3	13 October 2009	12 September 2005	2 January 2008	13 episodes; 2 discs; BBFC rating: 12; ACB rating: PG
4	13 October 2009	20 March 2006	4 September 2008	13 episodes; 2 discs; BBFC rating: 12; ACB rating: PG
5	TBA	18 September 2006	2 January 2009	13 episodes; 2 discs; BBFC rating: 12; ACB rating: PG
6	TBA	25 June 2007	1 October 2009	7 episodes; 1 disc; BBFC rating: 12; ACB rating: PG
7	TBA	24 September 2007	7 July 2011	9 episodes; 2 discs; BBFC rating: PG; ACB rating: PG
8	TBA	14 July 2008	6 October 2011	7 episodes; 1 disc; BBFC rating: 12; ACB rating: PG
9	TBA	25 May 2009	3 November 2011	9 episodes; 2 discs; BBFC rating: 12; ACB rating: PG
10	TBA	6 September 2010	5 April 2012	9 episodes; 2 discs; BBFC rating: 12; ACB rating: PG
11	TBA	15 August 2011	TBA	9 episodes; 2 discs; BBFC rating: 12

Multiple collection sets
Series	Release date		Features
Series	Region 2	Region 4	Features
Christmas 2002–2005	20 November 2006	No release	4 episodes; 1 disc; BBFC rating: PG
1–7	22 October 2007	No release	76 episodes; 12 discs; BBFC rating: 12
1–5	No release	7 April 2011	60 episodes; 9 discs; ACB rating: PG
6–8	No release	2011	23 episodes; 4 discs; ACB rating: PG
6–10	No release	7 November 2012	41 episodes; 6 discs; ACB rating: PG
Christmas 2006–2010	5 December 2011	No release	5 episodes; 2 discs; BBFC rating: 12
1–11 (complete)	5 December 2011	No release	
Christmas 2006–2009	28 March 2022	No release	4 episodes; 2 discs; BBFC rating: 12
