= My Family series 11 =

Season of television series

My Family
- Series 11
- Series 11 DVD Cover
- No. of episodes: 9

Release
- Original network: BBC One
- Original release: 1 July – 2 September 2011

Series chronology
- ← Previous; 10

The eleventh and final series of the BBC sitcom My Family began airing on 1 July 2011, and concluded on 2 September 2011. The opening episode, "Labour Pains", re-introduces the six main characters. All episodes from the eleventh series are thirty minutes in length. The series was produced by Rude Boy Productions, a company that produces comedies created by Fred Barron. Unlike previous series of the show, which were filmed on a yearly basis, both Series 10 and 11 were filmed back-to-back. The series has been released on DVD on 15 August 2011, meaning the last three episodes of the series was released before they were broadcast on the television.

== Episode Information ==
No. overall	No. in series	Title	Directed by	Written by	Original release date	UK viewers (millions)
110	1	"Janey's Choice"	Ed Bye	Andrew Kreisberg	17 June 2011 (Note: Originally unaired by the BBC, the ninth episode of the tenth series, Janey's Choice ", was first released on the series 10 DVD and eventually went to air on 17 June 2011 during the run of the eleventh series.)	4.37 (Note: Based on its 17 June 2011 broadcast.)
Kenzo, Janey and Mark return from the Zoo after a wonderful time, and then soon after Mark leaves, Australian backpacker Craig turns up to take Janey out. Mark turns up at Ben's dental surgery to ask for his blessing in marrying Janey and Ben is only too happy to oblige. Meanwhile another problem rises as Craig turns up at the Harper household to ask Susan for her blessing in allowing him to marry Janey. The whole situation culminates in a French restaurant, which Susan has booked, and both men try out their proposals to Janey, with little success, while Roger turns up with a Mexican band. Who will Janey choose? The Australian backpacker, the father of Kenzo and a wealthy businessman, or a Dentist? Note: This was episode was due to air at the end of series ten, and was such included on the DVD for the series. However, due to scheduling issues, was not aired until the eleventh series. This episode is now considered part of Season 11.
111	2	"Labour Pains"	Ed Bye	Darin Henry	1 July 2011	4.42
Ben returns home from a hard day's work, angrier than ever at the way Cavitex are now treating the dentists. He informs Susan that they've introduced time cards at work, and he is outraged because he doesn't have enough time to complete the crossword during his toilet break. The following morning, Ben has a meeting with fellow dentists, about the situation with Mr Griffith, where he makes a passionate speech against Mr Griffith and Cavitex, but when he receives a call from his boss, his attitude becomes much friendlier, especially out of earshot of his colleagues. Arriving at the office, Ben is uneasy of what to expect, but he's in for a surprise when Mr Griffith offers him a promotion. The array of items on "his" new desk distracts him from giving a proper answer to Mr. Griffith, but he soon accepts the position. Returning home, Ben attempts to show off his new suit and job to Michael, however, he's too busy playing his new game. The Cavitex meeting that evening cause Ben's old colleagues to realised they've been betrayed, especially when the answer to Roger's "excessively polite demands" causes both sides to take a step back. But as things come to a head for Ben, does he have a plan up his sleeve?
112	3	"Accusin' Susan"	Ed Bye	Robin Taylor	8 July 2011	3.62
Michael is enjoying the life of a layabout, but is soon distracted by Kenzo, who is upset at his report card – he's been given a C in Art. Michael soon realises that Kenzo has the same teacher as he used to have – Mr Tilley – and remembers that Tilley used to have an agenda against him. With Ben away at a conference – and still not having got the hang of texting – Susan throws herself into her work. At the art gallery, however, she's on the receiving end of some criticism from her boss, Katie, due to a badly designed and organized gallery, so Susan and a colleague, Chris, are ordered to stay behind that night to sort it out. Later that night the work is finished, and Chris is very impressed. However, Susan starts discussing art in a very sensual manner, which leads to Chris coming onto her. Much to her surprise, she finds out that Chris has filed a complaint about Susan for sexual harassment which leads to Katie suspending Susan from her work. After taking advice from Janey, Susan invites Chris over to her house to talk him into dropping the complaint. Much to her surprise, Chris reveals that he is attracted to Susan.
113	4	"Germs of Endearment"	Ed Bye	Ed Dyson	15 July 2011	3.81
Michael and Janey decide to treat their parents to a Spanish holiday for their anniversary, but the flight is a living hell as Ben picks fights with the other passengers. Then there is the little matter of the virus outbreak which forces them into quarantine on arrival at the airport. Back home, Michael admits he charged the all-expenses-paid trip to Ben's credit card – now all he needs is a fast way of paying it back. As an idea, Michael and Janey decide to sell some antiques in order to appear on television, but the man from the show who visits them disapproves their antiques until he sees the old mantle clock that Susan adores. Taking a risk, the two decide to sell the antique but replace it with a modern clock. As soon as Ben and Susan arrive from their holiday, the modern clock goes off and Susan blames Michael and Janey...
114	5	"Harper vs. Harper"	Ed Bye	Steve Armogida and Jim Armogida	22 July 2011 (Note: Originally unaired by the BBC, the eighth episode of the tenth series, "Harper vs. Harper", was first released on the series 10 DVD and eventually went to air on 22 July 2011 during the run of the eleventh series.)	4.13 (Note: Based on its 22 July 2011 broadcast.)
It's Susan's Godparents anniversary, and Ben doesn't want to go. Susan's determined to make him, but he point blank refuses… which sparks one of many, many arguments. After their old one collapses, they go to get a new bed, which they argue over, until they find separate beds, which turns into separate rooms, which eventually turns into separate houses. Susan stays at her house, while Ben seeks solace in Roger, who's expecting a woman around. And while Susan is enjoying herself with much happy company, Ben is ruining Roger's evening with a woman. The following night, it's Susan's turn to find accommodation elsewhere, and she ends up in Michael and Scott's flat, where, as usual, she tries to take control of things. Ben then intrudes on Roger the following evening… mainly because he's hungry, but Michael and Janey come around, begging him to apologise to Susan... they can't stand having their separate parents in each others' flats. Will they get back together, or will everyone's lives be ruined by their split? Note: This was episode was due to air at the end of series ten, and was such included on the DVD for the series. However, due to scheduling issues, was not aired until the eleventh series. This episode is now considered part of Season 11.
115	6	"Relationship Happens"	Ed Bye	Ed Dyson	29 July 2011	3.83
Susan feels in need of love and attention, and hopes dragging a reluctant Ben along on a spiritual course for couples will put the spark back into their marriage. Meanwhile, Michael and Janey are enjoying being the only responsible adults in the house when Matt – Michael's new boyfriend – manages to get into the house through the open front door, and joins the two of them in the kitchen where, much to Michael's annoyance, Janey is invited out clubbing with them. Coming back home, Michael starts to wonder if Janey actually cares about him. Ben and Susan are attending a class which involves just one simple task – writing ten things you love about your partner. They also attend a class on meditation, but Ben fails to relax due to an overwhelming urge to break wind. When Matt and Janey are due to go out to lunch again, Matt accidentally says some horrible things about Michael. It seems that blood really is thicker than water.
116	7	"Facebooked"	Ed Bye	Steve Armogida and Jim Armogida	5 August 2011	4.01
With Ben away on a volunteer dental programme in the Colombian rainforest, Janey is desperate for Susan to sign up to Facebook to get her friend count to a thousand, and even offers to set up her mother's account herself, which Susan declines. However, on seeing her profile, she's actually quite impressed. A message from Paul Tremayne also sends Susan down memory lane, and has Michael wishing for another father. The following morning, Susan is very impressed by the breakfast Janey is eating, but it's to her surprise to discover that Roger is the cook. Strangely, he's also taken on a role that Ben should have been doing for years – cleaning, fixing etc, and Susan takes full advantage of the situation. Later on that evening, Susan and Paul meet up for a chat, but unfortunately, the evening is cut short when Paul has to go off to run and errand in Chiswick and Susan offers to drop the package off for him. In doing so, she ends up getting arrested. It is not until she gets to the police station to find out that her old friend, Paul is a drug dealer whom the police have been trying to capture for a while. Susan is far from pleased.
117	8	"A Decent Proposal"	Ed Bye	David Cantor	12 August 2011	3.79
The Harpers are at Grace's funeral, and while Janey is concerned for her mother, Michael seems more interested in the backside of a young undertaker, Sean. Needing some time alone with her mother, Susan's grief soon turns into shock when her father, Arthur, suddenly turns up out of the blue very much alive. Susan's angry at his sudden re-appearance. After chatting with Ben, Arthur is surprised that Susan even married him in the first place, so he offers her £2 million to divorce him for good. Ben and Susan agree to the divorce, and decide they'll get married again after they receive the money. The following day, the two of them go to see a lawyer about getting divorced, but first they have to come up with a reason, and they're surprisingly imaginative. Michael's nerves get the better of him when he tells Sean that he is dying, just so he can spend some more time with him. After coming home from the lawyer they are shocked to discover that Arthur had died on the sofa while they were gone, and it seems that Arthur was lying all along and that he didn't actually have the money. Susan is disgusted with herself for even thinking about getting divorced for money. The following day, Michael finally plucks the courage to tell Sean that he isn't actually dying, but he may regret telling the truth.
118	9	"Darts All, Folks"	Ed Bye	Darin Henry	19 August 2011	3.70
Ben and Susan are in the pub, enjoying what she believes to be a quick drink before their meal out, when a man approaches their table He reveals himself to be Martin, an old fan of Ben's father's darts skills. Presuming Ben to have inherited his father's skills, he invites him to join their team, The Menaces. With Ben ignoring Susan whilst being distracted with the darts team, Susan reveals that now that he's distracted with the darts, she can spend money on whatever she likes, including a personal trainer. Later on, Susan is enjoying a session with Andre, her trainer, who uses her relaxed state to reveal the rather expensive bill, which she agrees to pay. At the pub, The Menaces are discussing Ben's lack of darts skill, although when he arrives, it takes a bit of time for the news to register. The following day, Roger arrives with some good news for Ben – one of his friends, Big Jerry, has died so Roger decides to take Ben as Big Jerry's replacement. Could Roger's decision be a decision to regret; and will Susan discover Andre's secret?
119	10	"Susan for a Bruisin'"	Ed Bye	Darin Henry	26 August 2011	3.74
When Susan is asked to give the keynote address at an upcoming school reunion involving her old school friends, she decides that she definitely wants to look her absolute best and not embarrass herself. But later, at work, Susan discovers that she will be training her younger "replacement". Shocked by this, she immediately quits her job. Meanwhile, Ben is busy testing a new cosmetic surgery scheme at his dental surgery called "Cavitox". Ben later arrives home from work, to find Susan taking part in an aerobics fitness session, but Ben suggests using "Cavitox" to make her look younger, but she refuses to use it, wanting to remain as natural as possible. Kenzo is later sent home from school, revealing that he had been sent home early for kicking a girl and Ben gives him advice about girls. But as Ben gets to the truth, he makes a suggestion on how the situation can be resolved When Susan goes to work the next day, she is shocked when she is asked to train her "replacement". Horrified by this, she immediately quits her job. The following day, a furious Janey confronts Ben about his advice to Kenzo and thanks to Ben, Janey has now lost a pearl necklace worth £500. Susans' self-esteem starts to stoop lower and lower when Ben is alarmed to find Susan lying on the sofa, having stayed there all night, surrounded by a mountain of junk food. Ben decides that enough is enough and invites the local Vicar around to cheer her up and it finally does the job, getting her off the sofa and desperately wanting Ben to apply some "Cavitox", however Ben is not too keen to apply it. How can it possibly go wrong?
120	11	"A Night Out"	Ed Bye	David Cantor	2 September 2011	3.89
In this series finale, the majority of the Harper clan are all heading out for the night – Janey's off with Susan to a hen party, while Roger's off to a blind date, with a girl he met on the Internet. Janey's rented Kenzo's favourite cartoon on DVD, so he and his grandfather (Ben) can remain entertained. A while later, at the Harper house, Kenzo is annoyed with Ben, who's watching a film instead of putting Kenzo's cartoon on. Ben can't believe that Kenzo isn't enjoying the film, but Kenzo's own plan of action soon comes into force, and Ben finds himself on the other side of the door – locked out. Kenzo then decides to make a sandwich out of most of the family's edible goods, much to the disgust of Ben, who's at the window still waiting to get back in. Kenzo's also orders a pizza, using Ben's credit card. When Michael arrives at the house, he is amused by Ben's predicament. Ben tries to get Michael to help him get inside, however, he refuses. Note: This episode was originally scheduled for 24 June 2011, but was postponed for ten weeks due to an overrun Wimbledon tennis match. The episode appeared on the BBC iPlayer television-on-demand service on the originally scheduled date, but was removed shortly afterwards.
