= Radford family =

British reality television family

The Radford family are a British family who first appeared in the 2012 Channel 4 documentary television programme 15 Kids and Counting, which featured several large British families. This was followed by 16 Kids and Counting, exclusively about the Radfords, which aired after they welcomed another child. Subsequent annual or biennial updates focused on successive years with further pregnancies by the Radford matriarch, each increasing the count. Upon the programme 22 Kids and Counting, the format changed along with the couple's decision not to have more children of their own. 22 Kids and Counting started airing on 9 January 2023 on Channel 5 and became a multi-part, multi-season series under the same title, accompanied by a social media presence.

== Overview ==
Noel and Sue were both adopted as babies and met as children, then had their first child, Christopher, when Sue was 14 and Noel was 18. They then got married when Sue was 17 and Noel was 21. The family now live in a former care home in Morecambe. The family owns and operates Radford's Pie Company, also known as Faraday's, a bakery in Heysham, which they acquired in 1999.

The 2018 programme 20 Kids and Counting covered Sue and Noel's 25th wedding anniversary and the birth of their 20th child.

As of 2021, Sue and Noel have had 22 children. While later episodes of the programme do feature pregnancies of some of Sue and Noel's older children, the series title has remained the same since it became 22 Kids and Counting, with the number reflecting how often Sue gave birth, and her children's kids coming under the "…and Counting" rubric.
