= My Family series 8 =

My Family
- Series 8
- My Family Series 8 DVD Cover
- No. of episodes: 7 + Christmas Special

Release
- Original network: BBC
- Original release: 11 April – 24 December 2008

Series chronology
- ← Previous; 7 Next → 9

The eighth series of the BBC family sitcom My Family originally aired between 11 April 2008 and 24 December 2008. The series was commissioned following consistent ratings from the seventh series. The opening episode, "The Parent Trap", re-introduces the seven main characters. All episodes from the eighth series are thirty minutes long, excluding the Christmas special. The series was once again produced by Rude Boy Productions, a company that produces comedies created by Fred Barron. The series was filmed at Pinewood Studios in London, in front of a live audience.

== Episode Information ==
No. overall	No. in series	Title	Directed by	Written by	Original release date	UK viewers (millions)
Series
84	1	"The Parent Trap"	Baz Taylor	Paul Minett and Brian Leveson.	11 April 2008	5.56
Ben is delighted when he takes delivery of a plasma television for his neighbour Mr MacIntyre, who is on holiday. Michael tells his parents that Nikki (Ellie Beaven), his girlfriend, is pregnant. He wants to propose to her, but her deeply religious parents, the Bakers, dislike the idea but suggest they donate £20,000 for the child's upbringing. When Nikki's parents throw her out, she moves in with Michael. Shortly after they arrive to talk to Nikki, and the Harpers leave them alone in the lounge. After hearing nothing, they check on them to discover that the Bakers have stolen nearly everything. Also, Janey is dating widowed Daniel and is determined that Kenzo and Daniel's son Joshua should get on. Absent: Alfie Butts
85	2	"Let's Not Be Heisty"	Baz Taylor	Ed Dyson	18 April 2008	5.43
When Ben goes to his bank to pay in a cheque from Alfie for two years' rent, he walks in during a robbery. Minutes later Janey follows him in. The robbers are a bickering couple Joan (Pauline Quirke) and Gary (Perry Benson), while the other hostages are Jim McKenzie (Sean Scanlan), manager Peter Warwick (Simon Chandler) and chief cashier Belinda Smith (Emma Kennedy). Janey is soon released in return for food, and hours later the police storm the bank and the other hostages are released. With Susan away, during the robbery a young, blonde Family Liaison Officer Penny Bishop (Georgia Tennant) comes round to comfort Michael and he takes advantage of the situation. Absent: Susan Harper, Abi Harper, Roger Bailey JR, Kenzo Harper, Alfie Butts
86	3	"Cards on the Table"	Baz Taylor	Paul Minett and Brian Leveson.	25 April 2008	5.23
Ben becomes addicted to poker while Susan has become addicted to seeing clairvoyant Zelda Nobbs (Anna Chancellor). Zelda tells Susan that Ben will die the following Thursday at 9.04 pm. When her other predictions come true, Ben and Susan plan to spend his final moments having sex. Just as they are about to, they realise their lounge clock has stopped and it is already 9.30 pm. To celebrate him not dying, they decide to go to Venice. Meanwhile, Susan suggests Roger gets some friends after he is annoyed that Abi goes out with her friends. Roger then goes out for the night with Michael and his friends, and plays poker with Ben's poker circle. Absent: Kenzo Harper, Alfie Butts
87	4	"The Wax Job"	Baz Taylor	Steve Armogida and Jim Armogida	2 May 2008	5.13
Susan is made the manager of the art gallery, and immediately has to prepare for a new exhibition. Meanwhile, Ben retires when he sells out to the Cavatex Corporation, which has become Roger's employer. Ben then starts painting model military figures and uses Alfie's room as a hobby room. Alfie then moves into Michael's room, and Janey soon has to give them relationship advice so they get on better. Ben soon gets bored of his new hobby, and assists Susan to set up the exhibition. When he gets the money for the surgery, and it is less than he expected, Ben has to go to Cavatex and persuade them he is committed to Cavatex so he gets his job back. Absent: Kenzo Harper
88	5	"Neighbour Wars"	Baz Taylor	Darin Henry	9 May 2008	5.02
Ben accidentally drives into Mr Casey (Nickolas Grace), the neighbour whose dog he previously ran over, and he ends up in hospital. The Police decide to take no action, but Ben wants Mr Casey to sign a disclaimer so he cannot later be sued. Mr Casey then spends his time recovering in Ben's house with Ben trying to persuade him to sign the disclaimer. However, Mr Channing (Jonathan Aris), from the insurance company tells Ben he believes it is a scam and Ben then tries to catch Mr Casey out. However, in the process he sits fire to his bedroom and they then have to make a deal so both can claim insurance. Meanwhile, Susan and Kenzo are in Scarborough for a week with Grace. Absent: Susan Harper, Abi Harper, Roger Bailey, Kenzo Harper Guest: Mr Casey (2nd of 3 appearances)
89	6	"Can't Get No Satisfaction"	Nic Phillips	David Cantor	16 May 2008	4.89
Kenzo is learning the piano, much to the family's disappointment. Ben reforms the rock and roll band he was with in his 20s, The Revolutions, and makes contact with guitarists Ziggy (Philip Bird) and Danny (David Keyes) and drummer Sticks (Rowland Rivron). However, they soon want to sack him as the lead singer. Susan hasn't the heart to tell him, until Ben criticises Kenzo during a school piano recital. Meanwhile, Michael organises dates for himself and Alfie over the Internet, but get their photographs mixed up and they have to pretend they are each other on the double date with Terri (Manal El-Feitury) and Georgia (Louise Mardenborough) Absent: Abi Harper, Roger Bailey JR
90	7	"The Abi Habit"	Nic Phillips	Tom Anderson	23 May 2008	4.74
Having not had sex for several weeks, Susan decides that to spice up their sex lives they should abstain from sex and even the slightest physical contact for three weeks. Ben is annoyed with this, but Susan is determined. Meanwhile, Roger gets a note from Abi that says she has left him to become a nun. Ben and Susan drive him to Abi's convent and she and Roger talk, but he is unable to persuade her to leave the convent and they leave without her. Janey asks Michael to look into her latest boyfriend, Ron (Ben Jones), and discovers that he still lives with his mother, something Janey says does not concern her. Absent: Kenzo Harper Last Ever Episode: Abi Harper
Special
91	S	"Have a Unhappy Christmas"	Nic Phillips	Paul Minett and Brian Leveson.	24 December 2008	7.12
Ben buys Susan a vacuum cleaner but soon regrets it, so he goes out to buy a necklace but is horrified to find it half price in a sale the next day. He goes back to complain but ends up getting locked in. Meanwhile Janey, Michael and Alfie order a stack of household items, with Ben and Susan's wedding photo on them. However a factory error leads to a risqué photo from Ben and Susan's wedding night being printed on the items. Guest starring Julian Clary. In the second part, Michael, Janey, Alfie and Roger compete to decide who gets the free holiday to Mauritius. The couple needs to decide whether to attend Susan's MBE investiture with the Queen at the Palace of Buckingham or Ben's award luncheon for 25 years' service with the British Dental Society.

== Reception ==
=== Viewers ===
Beginning with Series 8, My Family was given a much later slot, with most episodes airing at 9:30pm. The opening episode of the series gained only 5.56 million viewers, the poorest figure for an episode of the series yet. The eighth series averaged 5.39 million viewers for each episode.

Rank	Episode	Viewership	Audience Percentage
1	Have an Unhappy Christmas	7.12 million	
2	The Parent Trap	5.56 million	
3	Let's Not Be Heisty	5.43 million	
4	Cards on the Table	5.23 million	
5	The Wax Job	5.13 million	
6	Neighbour Wars	5.02 million	
7	Can't Get No Satisfaction	4.89 million	
8	The Abi Habit	4.74 million	
