= My Family series 7 =

My Family
- Series 7
- My Family Series 7 DVD Cover
- No. of episodes: 9 + Christmas Special

Release
- Original network: BBC
- Original release: 6 April – 26 December 2007

Series chronology
- ← Previous; 6 Next → 8

The seventh series of the BBC family sitcom My Family was originally broadcast between 6 April 2007 and 26 December 2007. It was commissioned following consistently high ratings from the sixth series. The opening episode, "The Ego Has Landed", re-introduces the seven main characters. All episodes from the seventh series are thirty minutes in length, with the exception of the Christmas special. The series was once again produced by Rude Boy Productions, a company that produces comedies created by Fred Barron. The series was filmed at Pinewood Studios near London, in front of a live audience.

== Episode information ==
No. overall	No. in series	Title	Directed by	Written by	Original release date	UK viewers (millions)
Series
74	1	"The Ego Has Landed"	Dewi Humphreys	Tom Anderson	6 April 2007	6.65
Ben and Susan have dinner with Les and Clare Morton, whom they met in Corfu, who ask Ben to be a sperm donor for them, something that increases Ben's ego. However, Dr. Kent Hawthorne (Jeremy Clyde) tells Ben that his sperm are "too lazy". Meanwhile, Janey is horrified when Kenzo's father, Mark Jameson, arrives and says that he now wants to be part of Kenzo's life. Janey is then upset when Kenzo calls Mark's wife, Linda, his "new Mummy", and she stops Mark from seeing Kenzo, until Susan persuades her otherwise. Abi has a dream that Roger cheated on her and later dreams that she has slept with Orlando Bloom.
75	2	"Four Affairs and a Funeral"	Dewi Humphreys	Steve Armogida and Jim Armogida	13 April 2007	5.58
Henry (Eric Sykes), an elderly patient of Ben's, comes to the surgery for treatment and confesses that he is unhappy in his marriage; he feels that his wife. At the age of 42, might be a little too old for him, so he has started an affair with a much younger woman. However, Henry soon dies in the surgery chair and leaves Ben in a very sticky situation – a situation that Roger is not too pleased about being roped into either. Soon, Ben finds himself comforting the Henry's wife but, even sooner, he finds himself being dragged into the world of Henry's other woman. Meanwhile, Susan is getting suspicious and follows Ben to the funeral, much to his dismay. Absent: Kenzo Harper
76	3	"Once More With Feeling"	Dewi Humphreys	Steve Armogida and Jim Armogida	20 April 2007	5.64
Susan suggests to Ben that they renew their wedding vows, but he is reluctant and when he is given directors' tickets for a football match, they have to find a compromise that allows both to happen on the same day. Meanwhile, Janey is trying to getting Kenzo into St. Justin's School, and to do so has to impress the vicar, Denis, who soon asks Janey out, but later goes off her after a conversation with Susan. However, he still agrees to recommend Kenzo for the school. Abi and Roger decide to marry on a Saturday and Ben's not-so-innocent chat with Kenzo leads to him telling Susan who stops Ben going to the football match.
77	4	"Dutch Art and Dutch Courage"	Dewi Humphreys	Steve Armogida and Jim Armogida	27 April 2007	5.72
Susan is going away for the weekend with a millionaire James Garrett (Robert Bathurst) on an art-buying trip, which makes Ben jealous. At the hotel it is discovered that James' assistant forgot to book him a room, so he and Susan have to share a twin room. Meanwhile, Michael experiences his first failure when he fails his driving test. The following day Ben drives him to his university interview, and on the way buys Michael his first pint, which results in him throwing up all over the professor. Janey hurts her neck at the gym and Alfie gives her an amazing massage which she then recommends to Abi, resulting in a rather jealous Roger. Absent: Kenzo Harper
78	5	"Susan of Troy"	Dewi Humphreys	Ed Dyson	4 May 2007	6.48
Susan's mother, Grace, visits, and tells them she was married on holiday to Brad. Soon after, Ben, Susan, Michael, Janey, Alfie, Grace, Brad, Abi and Roger appear on a family edition of The Weakest Link, presented by Anne Robinson, after Michael applied to go on. Abi is voted off first, followed by Roger, Janey and Brad. Before Grace is voted off, she reveals on air that in 1973 a drunken Susan married a wrestler called Troy the Punisher in Las Vegas. Susan is then voted off, followed by a furious Ben, who demands to know what happened. Susan tells him the marriage was annulled after one day. In the head to head, Alfie beats Michael to win the prize money.
79	6	"One of the Boys"	Dewi Humphreys	David Cantor	11 May 2007	6.76
Ben's old University friend, Charlie Briggs (Diana Weston) arrives and Ben faints as it is revealed that Charlie has had a sex change and is now a woman called Charlotte. She asks Ben to give her away at her forthcoming wedding, but his initial reluctance sees Susan agree to give her away instead. Meanwhile, Roger's mother Nerys Bailey (Olwyn Reeves) arrives from Wales to meet Abi. She treats Roger like a child, and says that as a wedding present she is buying them a house next to hers in Wales. Susan has to force Roger to tell his mother he does not want to live next to her. Janey needs £10,000 so she can buy a share in a vintage clothing company, but the bank refuses her a loan. Absent: Kenzo Harper
80	7	"Abi Ever After"	Dewi Humphreys	George Jeffrie and Bert Tyler-Moore	18 May 2007	5.86
The day before Roger and Abi's wedding, Ben and Susan hold a party. Abi's mother Shelley (Lorraine Chase), who has been married several times, tries to make a pass at Ben. Meanwhile, Michael and Alfie try to chat up a girl, and both tell her the other is gay. On the wedding day, Ben is best man and Janey is bridesmaid. It is also Janey's birthday, and her boyfriend, Steve, finishes with her over the phone. When taking their vows, Abi says she cannot marry Roger, and tells Susan that she fears she will end up like her mother. However, Susan talks her round and Abi and Roger marry. Absent: Kenzo Harper
81	8	"Breaking Up Ain't Hard to Do"	Dewi Humphreys	Paul Minett and Brian Leveson.	25 May 2007	5.57
Ben and Susan's oldest friends, Ted and Joanna Draper (Geoffrey McGivern and Emma Amos), are having marriage problems and Ben and Susan soon become involved. They then argue themselves about what in the house belongs to who. Meanwhile, Janey wants Kenzo to appear in a television advertisement for breakfast cereal, but pulls him out just before the audition as she begins to feel guilty that she is not giving Kenzo a choice and is then offered a part herself. Michael tries unsuccessfully to make Alfie an Internet musical star but Alfie's stage fright, even though the only other person in the room is Michael, prevents his debut. Absent: Abi Harper, Roger Bailey Jr
82	9	"Life Begins at Fifty"	Dewi Humphreys	George Jeffrie and Bert Tyler-Moore	8 June 2007	4.84
Susan is arrested for stealing a £250 pair of sunglasses when she is going through the menopause. However, she refuses to accept that this has caused her to forget to pay for them. When the case goes to court, Ben defends her and tries to persuade the court that the stealing was a result of the menopause. The judge (Nichola McAuliffe) dismisses the case and gives Susan advice on the menopause much to Susan's disgust. Meanwhile, Alfie takes Kenzo to the park for Janey and meets a girl called Melanie, and later pretends Kenzo is his son and Janey his ex-wife – but can he convince Janey to play along? Absent: Kenzo Harper Note: This episode was moved back a week, as no episode was broadcast on Friday 1 June 2007 because BBC One showed live coverage of England's friendly football match against Brazil at the new Wembley Stadium in its time slot
Special
83	S	"Ho Ho No"	Baz Taylor	Tom Anderson	26 December 2007	6.14
Susan tells Ben that she has planned his perfect Christmas, a quiet stay at a country hotel without the children. However, she has secretly invited the whole family, and Alfie turns up with his strange uncle and Michael brings his Communist girlfriend Gwen. Susan tries to ensure that Ben does not see the rest of the family, which proves difficult when Abi, who has become the hotel's massage therapist, has to give him a massage. Later that evening, Crystal, one of Ben's patients who is stalking him, turns up saying her fiancé has just escaped from prison and is coming to kill Ben, and a mysterious man (John Challis) who says he is an actor playing Jacob Marley turns up. Susan and Ben then run round the hotel trying to hide from the fiancé, and soon Ben sees that the whole family is there. Gwen's father then arrives. Later, when Ben goes to reception, the police tell him that Crystal's fiancé has been caught. When he and the rest of the family go back into the main hall it has been mysteriously decorated and Christmas presents placed on the floor.

== Reception ==
=== Viewers ===
The series was once again given a prime-time Friday evening slot, with most episodes broadcast at 8:30pm. No episodes in the series managed to attract over 6.8 million viewers, a considerable loss compared to previous series.

The final episode of the series, "Life Begins at Fifty", was moved back a week due to international football, losing around 1.5 million viewers.

The seventh series averaged 5.92 million viewers for each episode.

Rank	Episode	Viewership	Audience percentage
1	One of the Boys	6.76 million	
2	The Ego Has Landed	6.65 million	
3	Susan of Troy	6.48 million	
4	Ho Ho No	6.14 million	
5	Abi Ever After	5.86 million	
6	Dutch Art and Dutch Courage	5.72 million	
7	Once More With Feeling	5.64 million	
8	Four Affairs and a Funeral	5.58 million	
9	Breaking Up Ain't Hard to Do	5.57 million	
10	Life Begins at Fifty	4.84 million	

=== Critics ===
Tom Simpson, of My Family Online, thought that one particular episode from the series stood out. He wrote that "One of the Boys", written by the friend of Jason, David Cantor, is a "brilliant, lively, funny episode that also contains a rare moment of emotion", and that the episode brought a tear to his eye.
