= Kris Marshall =

English actor (born 1973)

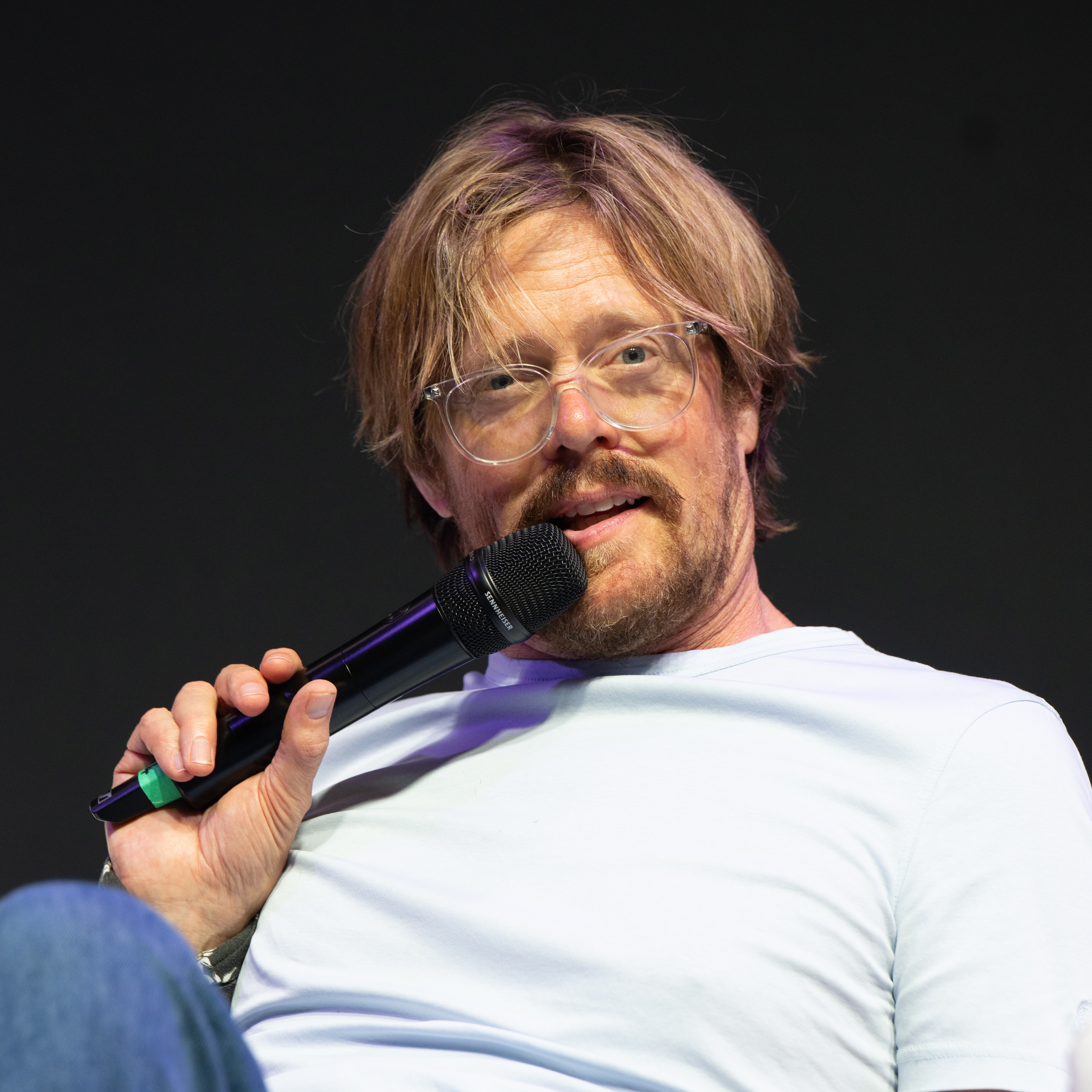
- At MCM London Comic Con, 23 May 2026
- Born: Kristopher Marshall; 1 April 1973 (age 53); Bath, Somerset, England
- Occupations: Actor; comedian
- Years active: 1993–present
- Spouse: Hannah Dodkin (m. 2012)
- Children: 2

Kristopher Marshall (born 1 April 1973) is an English actor. He has played Nick Harper in My Family, Colin Frissell in the 2003 film Love Actually, Gratiano in The Merchant of Venice, DS Luke Stone in Murder City (2004–2006), and Dave in the first series of Citizen Khan (2012). He played DI Humphrey Goodman in Death in Paradise from 2014 to 2017 and reprised the role in Beyond Paradise in 2023. He also played Tom Parker in the historical drama Sanditon from 2019 to 2023.

== Early life and education ==
Kristopher Marshall was born in 1973 in Bath, Somerset. His father was a Royal Air Force (RAF) navigator, whose career included a posting to the Queen's Flight, eventually becoming a squadron leader. His parents divorced when he was 12.

Marshall moved with his family to Hong Kong and later to Canada. Upon their return to England, he was educated at Wells Cathedral School as a boarding pupil. After failing his initial A-levels in his first year of sixth form and being expelled, he worked various jobs and enrolled at the Redroofs Theatre School in Maidenhead, Berkshire.

== Career ==
Marshall made an early career appearance on the police series The Bill but it was in 2000 that his major breakthrough role came as Nick Harper in the BBC sitcom My Family. In 2003, he appeared in the film Love Actually as Colin Frissell, an Englishman who goes to Milwaukee, Wisconsin to find love.

In 2004, Marshall appeared as DS Luke Stone in the police drama series Murder City. From 2005 to 2011, Marshall appeared on TV and in print for BT Retail adverts, where he played the character Adam; with Esther Hall portraying his character's eventual wife Jane. He also played The Ginger Dave in the BBC comedy series Citizen Khan in 2012 but left after season 1.

Since departing his full-time role in My Family in 2003, Marshall made guest appearances three times appearing in 2 episodes of season five in 2004 and his final appearance in a short Comic Relief special in 2005. He finished working on the film Heist at the end of 2006, which aired in April 2008 on BBC Four. During the summer of 2008, Marshall appeared at Trafalgar Studios in the first UK run of Neil LaBute's play Fat Pig. He became a regular cast-member, playing the character of Ethan on the series Traffic Light in 2011.

In April 2013, it was announced that Marshall would be joining the cast of BBC drama Death in Paradise as the island's new lead detective, DI Humphrey Goodman. His character was introduced in the first episode of the third series which aired in 2014, with his first case being to solve the murder of his predecessor, DI Richard Poole (played by Ben Miller). In January 2017 it was leaked that Marshall would be leaving the series citing the pressures it placed upon his family and that he would be replaced by Ardal O'Hanlon who plays DI Jack Mooney.

Marshall starred as Tom Sanger in the 2015 independent British romantic comedy Sparks and Embers.

Marshall reprised the role of DI Humphrey Goodman from Death in Paradise in a BBC spin-off Beyond Paradise, set in South Devon, which first aired in February 2023.

== Personal life ==
Marshall was hit by a car in Bristol in 2008. The crash happened in the early hours of 28 April as he enjoyed a night out with friends in Bristol city centre. He was taken to Bristol Royal Infirmary, where a scan revealed head injuries. He made a full recovery and began his performances in the play Fat Pig three weeks later as scheduled. Marshall passionately supports Aston Villa and said that a card from the club helped him through his recovery.

In October 2011, Marshall was charged with failing to provide a breath test after police stopped his car in the Tesco car park in Wells, Somerset.

Marshall married Hannah Dodkin in 2012 when he was 39. He and Dodkin have a son and daughter. As of December 2019 they were living in Bath.

== Filmography ==
=== Film ===
Year	Title	Role	Notes
2000	Dead Babies	Skip	
2000	The Most Fertile Man in Ireland	Éamonn Manley	
2000	Five Seconds to Spare	Martin	
2000	Je t'aime John Wayne	Belmondo	Short film
2001	Iris	Dr. Gudgeon	
2002	Mexicano	Jake Morton	Short film
2002	The Four Feathers	Edward Castleton	
2002	Deathwatch	Pvt. Barry Starinski	
2003	Love Actually	Colin Frissell	
2004	The Merchant of Venice	Gratiano	
2006	Free Jimmy	Erik (voice)	English version
2007	The Amazing Trousers	Henry	Short film
2007	Death at a Funeral	Troy	
2007	World of Wrestling	The Kid	Short film
2008	Easy Virtue	Furber	
2010	Meant to Be	Archie	
2011	Oka! Amerikee	Larry	
2011	A Few Best Men	Tom	
2015	Sparks & Embers	Tom Sanger	
2017	A Few Less Men	Tom	
2018	Royal Affairs	Ambassador	Short film
2019	Trick or Treat	The Cop	
2021	Paul Dood's Deadly Lunch Break	Bronson	
2021	Promises	Louis	
2021	Father Christmas Is Back	Peter Hope	

=== Television ===
Year	Title	Role	Notes
1993	Closing Numbers	Fredericks	Television film
1996	The Bill	Terry Cullen	Series 12; episode 71: "Overstepping the Mark"
1998	Trial & Retribution	PC Henshaw	Series 2; episodes 1 & 2: "Trial & Retribution II: Part One & Part Two"
1999	The Bill	Hugh Kane	Series 15; episode 48: "Screwdriver"
2000	Metropolis	Frank Green	Mini-series; episodes 1–5
2000–2005	My Family	Nick Harper	Series 1–5; 45 episodes
2002	Dead Casual	(unknown)	Television film
2002	Doctor Zhivago	Pasha Antipov / Streinkov	Mini-series; episodes 1–3
2004	My Life in Film	Art	Episodes 1–6
2004–2006	Murder City	DS Luke Stone	Series 1 & 2; 10 episodes
2005	Funland	Dudley Sutton	Mini-series; episodes 1–11
2007	Catwalk Dogs	Michael Purvis	Television film
2007	Sold	Matt	Episodes 1–6
2007	Jackanory Junior	Himself - Storyteller	Episode: "King Arthur and the Mighty Contest"
2008	Heist	Dick Puddlecote	Television film
2008	Sex, Drugs and Rock 'n' Roll: The 60s Revealed	Himself - Narrator	Episodes 1–3
2010	Human Target	Doug Slocum	Series 1; episode 7: "Salvage & Reclamation"
2010	D.O.A.	Tom Lassiter	Television film
2011	Traffic Light	Ethan	Episodes 1–13
2012	15 Kids and Counting	Himself - Narrator	Television Special
2012	Citizen Khan	Dave	Series 1; episodes 1–6
2013	16 Kids and Counting	Himself - Narrator	Television Special
2013	Derek	Himself	Cameo appearance
2013	Lightfields	Paul Fenner / Paul Willard	Mini-series; episodes 1–5
2014–2017	Death in Paradise	DI Humphrey Goodman	Series 3–6; 30 episodes
2016	Ambulance	Himself - Narrator	Series 1; episodes 1–3
2017	Borderline	Baron of Sandwich	Series 2; episode 1: "New Terminal"
2018	Sky Comedy Shorts	Max	Episode: "Kris Marshall's Whodunnit"
2018	20 Kids and Counting	Himself - Narrator	Television Special
2019	Better Things	Tibor	Season 3; episodes 2 & 4: "Holding" & "Monsters in the Moonlight"
2019	21 Kids and Counting	Himself - Narrator	Television Special
2019–2023	Sanditon	Tom Parker	Series 1–3; 20 episodes
2020	We Hunt Together	Cian Fitzgerald	Series 1; episodes 3–5: "103", "104" & "105"
2023–present	Beyond Paradise	DI Humphrey Goodman	Series 1–4; 27 episodes. Also executive producer

=== Radio ===
Year	Title	Role
2008	Spending My Inheritance	Harry
2011–2013	The Diary of Samuel Pepys	Samuel Pepys

=== Theatre ===
Year	Title	Role
2006	The Hypochondriac	Cleante
2006	The Revenger's Tragedy	Vindici
2007	Treats	Dave
2008	Fat Pig	Carter
2017	Ugly Lies the Bone	Kelvin
2017	Glengarry Glen Ross	John Williamson
2023	Charlotte and Theodore	Theodore

=== Music video ===
- Chicane - "No More I Sleep"

== Awards ==
- 2002 – British Comedy Awards – Best Newcomer
