= Keiron Self =

British actor & writer (born 1971)

- Born: Keiron Gareth Self; 1971 (age 54–55); Newport, Wales
- Education: Royal Welsh College of Music & Drama
- Occupations: Actor; writer
- Years active: 1998–present

Keiron Gareth Self (born 1971) is a British actor and writer best known for playing Roger Bailey, Jr. in the BBC sitcom My Family. His other acting credits include Casualty, Lucky Bag and playing PC Claude Cox in the sitcom High Hopes. He has also provided the voice of Police Chief Llunos in the BBC radio production of Aberystwyth Mon Amour. His writing credits include the 2000 sketch show TV To Go, Lucky Bag, The Story of Tracy Beaker and the 2001 sketch show Velvet Soup. His theatre performances also include the recent role of Bob Acres in the restoration comedy The Rivals.

== External ==
- Keiron Self at IMDb
