= Tayler Marshall =

British actor (born 2000)

- Born: 25 January 2000 (age 26); Sutton, England
- Occupation: Actor
- Years active: 2005–present
- Parent(s): Terri Pointing (mother); Tim Marshall (father)
- Website: taylermarshall.com

Tayler Marshall (born 25 January 2000) is a British actor, best known for his role as Kenzo Harper in British situation comedy series My Family from 2005 to 2011, he appeared in My Family for 23 episodes over a period of 5 series and 5 years.

== Career ==
Tayler Marshall was born on 25 January 2000, in Sutton, Surrey. His acting career started at the age of five when he was offered the role of Kenzo Harper in My Family. He went on to appear in 23 episodes over the five seasons. Since then, some of his work includes: A Young Doctor's Notebook, Hollyoaks, Doctors, Jack the Giant Slayer, two episodes of Casualty and the lead in short film Hot Guy Has Issues.

== Filmography ==
=== Film ===
Year	Title	Role	Notes
2013	Jack the Giant Slayer	1st Child	
2013	Justin and the Knights of Valour	Child number 1	

=== Television ===
Year	Title	Role	Notes
2005–11	My Family	Pooh Boy/Kenzo Harper	23 episodes
2012	Casualty	Connor Collinson	Episode: "I Saw Mommy Killing Santa Claus"
2012	A Young Doctor's Notebook	Young Boy	Episode #1.3
2013	Doctors	Harry	Episode: "Heston's Last Testament"
2013	Father Figure	Fran Curtain	2 episodes
2013	Hollyoaks	Young Tony Hutchinson	Episode #1.3718
2019	Casualty	Fred Gatlin	Series 34. Episode 4
