= Siobhan Hayes =

English actress

- Born: Siobhan Teresa Hayes; 21 July 1974 (age 51); St Pancras, London, England
- Occupation: Actress
- Years active: 1982–present

Siobhan Teresa Hayes (born 21 July 1974) is an English actress. She is known for her roles as Abi Harper in the BBC sitcom My Family and Sandy in the BBC radio series Absolute Power.

== Career ==
Hayes portrayed Abi Harper a student in the British sitcom My Family, a role she held between 2002 and 2008, when the character became a nun. She has also made guest appearances in Little Britain, Paul Merton: The Series, Agatha Christie's Marple, Birds of a Feather, and The Bill. Her early appearances included portraying a pupil of Class 5C onwards from 1991, in the series Up the Garden Path.

In 2005, she was a contestant on the third series of the BBC competition Strictly Come Dancing, paired with professional Matthew Cutler. The couple were the first to be eliminated. On 1 February 2008, it was announced that Hayes would be joining EastEnders, in the role of Melinda, the partner of the show's returning Ricky Butcher portrayed by Sid Owen. This was Hayes' second role in EastEnders, as she portrayed Jane on 4 July 1991. Hayes starred in the 2011 British live action 3D family comedy film Horrid Henry: The Movie, portraying the role of the titular character's mother. In 2022, Hayes appeared in an advert for Specsavers and also featured in the Christmas advert for McDonald's.

== Filmography ==
Year	Title	Role	Notes
1982	The Chinese Detective	Charity	
1985	Blue Money	Una	
1985	Flesh+Blood	Child of the Castle	
1986	Mr Magus Is Waiting for You	Charlie	
1990–1991	Up the Garden Path	4C/5C Pupil Wendy	
1991	EastEnders	Jane	
1991–1994	Screen One	Shop Assistant; Babysitter	
1992, 1994, 2000	The Bill	Karen Dawes (1992); Lynne Halford (1994); Tracey Barnes (2000)	Episodes: "Raiders" (1992) "Fair Exchange" (1994) "Riot City" (2000)
1993	Paul Merton: The Series	Emily	
1993	Demob	Waitress	
1993, 1998	Birds of a Feather	Tina / Hayley	
1997	Bramwell	Daisy Jenner	
1999	Starting Out	Samantha	
1999	Put Out More Fags		
2000	Cry Wolf	Cherry	
2001	Iris	Checkout Girl	
2002–2008	My Family	Abi Harper	
2003	Little Britain	Julie	3 episodes
2004	Agatha Christie's Marple	Mary Hill	Episode: "The Murder at the Vicarage"
2005	Holby City	Eve Lewis	Episode: "No Pain No Gain"
2005	Harry Hill's Shark Infested Custard	Evelynne Hussey	
2006	The Secret Life of Mrs. Beeton	Anne	
2008	EastEnders	Melinda	
2008	Barnet Shuffle	Kelly	Short
2008	Doctors	Sasha Ecclestone	Episode: "From the Ashes"
2011	Horrid Henry: The Movie	Henry's Mum	
2012	Crime Stories	Andrea Marshall	
2013	Murder on the Home Front	Jenny	Special
2018	Holby City	Maeve Atwater	Episode: "Hold My Hand"
