= Gateway Films =

British production company

- Type: Independent Company
- Industry: Entertainment; Filmmaking; Marketing
- Founded: 2009
- Founder: Terry Stone
- Key people: Terry Stone; Stuart William; Chris Howard
- Products: Motion pictures CGI animation 3D animations

Gateway Films is an independent London based production company, specialising in crime and youth films. It was officially established in 2009 by actor Terry Stone, in collaboration with Terry Byrne, Chris Howard.

In 2010, the company launched Gateway Animation Studio, by Stuart william which is the first animation studio in Great Britain dedicated to producing CGI feature length films and children's 3D animations.

In 2011 Gateway Films collaborated with Bhatt Entertainment and started filming worldwide.

== Productions ==
- Rise of the Footsoldier (2007)
- Doghouse (2009)
- Shank (2010)
- Bonded by Blood (2010)
- Anuvahood (2011)
- The Holding (2011)
- Sket (2011)
- Outside Bet (2012)
- Get Lucky (2013)
- Saving Santa (2013)
- Plastic (2013)
- Messenger (2014)
- Away (2016)
- Once Upon a Time in London (2017)
- O2 (2019)
