= David Blair (director) =

British film and television director

David Blair is a British film and television director. He has received a BAFTA award for The Street.

Blair directed Common, a 2014 BBC One 90-minute made-for-television drama, written by Jimmy McGovern and starring Michelle Fairley, Nico Mirallegro and Michael Gambon, which sought to question some of the issues and challenges raised by England's common purpose legal doctrine.

During 2014 Blair completed the feature film The Messenger (released 2015), starring Robert Sheehan, Lily Cole, Tamzin Merchant, Joely Richardson and David O'Hara.

His 2016 feature film Away starred Timothy Spall, Juno Temple, Matt Ryan and Susan Lynch. Blair then went on to complete another Jimmy McGovern film for the BBC, Reg (2016) starring Tim Roth and Anna Maxwell Martin. Blair worked with Jimmy McGovern in The Lakes (1997), The Street (2006–09) and Accused (2010–12).

== Filmography ==
- Tabloid (2001)
- Mystics (2003)
- The Fattest Man in Britain (2009)
- Best Laid Plans (2012)
- Bert and Dickie (2012)
- Common (2014)
- The Messenger (2015)
- Away (2016)
- Hurricane (2018) - aka Mission of Honor (US title)

== TV movies ==
- The Brown Man (1993)
- Vicious Circle (1999)
- Split Second (1999)
- Donovan Quick (2000)
- Malice Aforethought (2005)
- Whatever Love Means (2005)
- Reg (2016)
- The Block (2018)
- Care (2018)

== Television ==
- City Lights (1989) - 1 episode
- The Play on One (1990) - 1 episode
- Strathblair (1992) - 6 episodes
- Takin' Over the Asylum (1994)
- The Vet (1995) - 2 episodes
- A Mug's Game (1996)
- Turning World (1996)
- The Lakes (1997) - 4 episodes
- Shockers (1999) - 1 episode
- Anna Karenina (2000)
- The Street (2006–09)
- Tess of the D'Urbervilles (2008)
- Accused (2010–2012) - 6 episodes
- Playhouse Presents: Snodgrass (2013) - 1 episode
- The Suspicions of Mr Whicher (2014) - 1 episode
- Isolation Stories: Karen (2020)
- The Reckoning (2023)

== Awards ==
- BAFTA Television Award for Best Drama Series (2007)
