= Special effects of Starship Troopers =

The special effects of the 1997 American military science fiction action film Starship Troopers were initially developed by visual-effects company Tippett Studio and Sony Pictures Imageworks (SPI). However, the scale of the project and management issues at SPI led to many of the required effects being delegated to several other companies, including Industrial Light & Magic (ILM), Boss Film Studios, Visual Concepts Engineering (VCE), Amalgamated Dynamics, and Mass. Illusion. Of the film's $100–$110 million budget, about half was afforded to the film's 500 special effects shots.

== Overview ==
=== Summary ===
Of the $100–$110 million budget, about half was afforded to the film's 500 special effects shots. At the time, no film had involved over 200 CGI shots. Phil Tippett's Tippett Studio was mainly responsible for producing effects relating to the Arachnids, or "bugs", while Sony Pictures Imageworks (SPI) was tasked with spaceship effects. Starship Troopers' producer, Jon Davison, had other preferred studios he wanted to use instead of SPI, but it was made clear to him that the film would not receive financing to proceed without using the in-house studio of production studio TriStar Pictures parent company, Sony Pictures Motion Picture Group. Headed by Ken Ralston, SPI would lead to problems for the production of Starship Troopers, with their contributions falling months behind schedule and those effects that were completed not being of sufficient standard to the filmmakers. A "highly placed" employee of the Starship Troopers production said that SPI was poorly managed, disorganized, and rarely on set or involved in the production. while another said that SPI's priorities were split with developing the effects for the science fiction film, Contact (1997). Due to the high quantity of effects that needed to be completed, by the end of 1996, the film's managing company, Big Bug, reassigned many of the special effects shots from SPI to other California-based effects companies, including Industrial Light & Magic (ILM), Boss Film Studios, Visual Concepts Engineering (VCE), and Mass. Illusion. Toward the end of production, visual effects supervisor Laura Buff recommended visual effects artist, Scott E. Anderson, to Verhoeven, who insisted Anderson take over as effects supervisor at SPI, improving the studios output.

Many key crew members were hired in 1996, including Stacey McIntosh (construction coordinator), Karen Higgins (construction foreman), Gregg Goldstone (first assistant director), Kenneth Silverstein (second assistant director), John Blake (makeup artist), Kathy Blondell (hair stylist), William Petrotta (prop master), Robert Galotti (weapons coordinator), Robert Latham Brown (production manager), Daren Hicks (production coordinator), and Janet Campolito and Lisa Hackler (assistant production coordinators). Tippett also hired the nearly 100 additional staff required to realize the Arachnids, including Jules Roman (Tippett Studio visual effects producer), Craig Hayes (visual effects artist), Trey Stokes (animation department head), Adam Valdez and Blake Clark (animators), Paula Luchessi (lead CGI painter), Julie Newdoll (supervisor of CGI lighting), Brennan Doyle (lead compositor), Desiree Mourad (lighting), and Joanna Ladolcetta (lead rotoscoper).

Allan Cameron served as the production designer for Starship Troopers, holding responsibility for the film's overall aesthetic and designing much of the technology and alien worlds, Klendathu, Tango Urilla, and Planet P. The art department included two art directors (Steven Wolff and Bruce Hill), three set designers, one conceptual artist (Jim Martin), two storyboard artists, and an administrative supervisor. Cameron said that he provided the designs, and the art directors made his vision a reality; Cameron credited Martin with having a significant influence on the overall aesthetic. Verhoeven and Cameron were influenced by contemporary Singapore, interpreting it as a disciplined society with no antisocial behaviour, graffiti, or litter. Architectural designs were similarly influenced by this conceot of a "pure" and formal world, designed to suggest the Earth was one large military base. Not intended to look futuristic or realistic, but evoke old Westerns, World War II movies and adventure films.

Starship Troopers had been scheduled for release on July 2, 1997, before being pushed back to July 25, then September, and finally November 7. This was ostensibly because the special effects were so far behind schedule that additional time was needed to complete production, although other Sony films, Men in Black and Air Force One were moved into the July dates as they were also seen as more commercially viable than Starship Troopers. Despite the setbacks, SPI's over 250 employees produced 2000 separate model elements 90 effects shots.

=== Technical ===
Preliminary motion control photography tests were conducted at Tippett Studio during pre-production. The process allowed for consistent and repetitive automated camera movements that would be essential for the addition of CGI elements in post-production, and it was important the cameras accurately recorded metadata such as the time of day, angle of light, and camera position. Tippett Studio also used an aerial radar-based scanner to produce a detailed map of Hell's Half Acre, one of the main filming locations. This provided a precise topographical map of the terrain which they could reference against the camera position. Tracking markers on the ground corresponded to paths where CGI creatures would later be placed.

Filming generally involved scenes of the actors interacting with invisible elements that would be added later, with the motion controls recording the camera movements. The scene would then be recorded without the actors to capture a clear image of the background. Afterward, a large, neutral-gray, sphere was positioned where the Arachnids would later be added as a reference point. The color of the ball helped inform animators about how light was interacting with the area to enhance the realism of their CGI creations. Cinematographer Jost Vacano said, "You could see, for instance, if it was a side light or a top light. We could also look at the shadow areas, and also check the relationship between the bright areas on the ball and the fill light on the opposite side. This was very useful for Tippett, because he had to tell the computers exactly what the light situation was ... the contrast situation ." Vacano primarily used Kodak's 500 ASA 5298 for night scenes and 50 ASA 5245 for daylight exteriors.

=== Sets and locations ===
Cameron and location manager Bill Bowling scouted several filming locations but rejected most as they did not consider them unique enough. Others, such as the Valley of Fire State Park in Nevada had too many environmental restrictions which could impact filming. The situation was made more difficult by an extended period of U.S. government shutdowns, which made obtaining the necessary filming and associated permits protracted, so they intentionally avoided further scouting of national or state parks or government owned land. This restriction limited their options, however, particularly for impactful scenery. Bowling eventually discovered Hell's Half Acre, located just outside of the town of Casper, Wyoming, which offered "colorful buttes and pinnacles," which could portray the alien planets of Klendathu and Planet P. The location was remote, however, being about 45 miles (72 km) from the Astaire Building or hotels and requiring an hour drive every morning at 5am. It offered other logistical challenges as it was generally undeveloped land, so the production had to build roads for the trucks carrying their gear into the canyons for filming. Anything that could not be driven in had to be lowered by helicopter. The local government was supportive of the project, helping subsidized the costs of building the roads and camp. They later learned that the area was rife with rattlesnakes, although no crew was bitten. The area was the biggest set Vacano had lit. It was difficult to get lights down into the canyons and so lighting was provided mainly by 25 spotlights on the overlooking cliffs, with smaller lights hidden behind rocks or hills. The cliff was also difficult to access so a secure path had to be built, and it still took electricians about 2 hours to reach.

The location featured extreme weather, with very warm days followed by frigid evenings that took a toll on much of the on-site equipment, requiring various replacements to be flown in on a regular basis. The location was also beset by torrential rain, blizzards, and wind storms up to 80 miles (130 km) per hour. The site had to be evacuated temporarily after rain mixing with the bentonite in the ground created a slick surface. The crew took as much equipment as they could, and after the rain stopped two weeks later, miles of electrical cables, some equipment, and even cars had been lost under the mud. Even so, only a few days were lost to the weather as a local warehouse had been converted into a soundstage for backup scenes to be filmed. Alongside the weather conditions, filming in Hell's Half Acre took its toll on the crew, with respiratory illnesses, exhaustion, and heat stroke from wearing heavy costumes in the 115 °F (46 °C). Dozens of people per day were treated for the ailment, and production had to be shut down for a week at a cost of $1.5 million a day after it affected Busey.

Construction of some on-location sets, such as the Whiskey Outpost camp overrun by Arachnids on Planet P, began in February 1996 and took six weeks. Whiskey Outpost was designed to resemble a futuristic French Foreign Legion fort and took influence from the fortress in the adventure film, Beau Geste (1939), which featured defensive ramparts, and war film Zulu (1964). The area was landscaped and black asphalt poured atop. Sprung Instant Structures provided pre-fabricated huts, which helped create the impression that the structures were regularly packed up and moved to different planets. It was difficult to find a location for the Camp Currie boot camp scenes until finding Mile Square Regional Park in Fountain Valley. Cameron liked it because it had an abandoned World War II blimp runway onto which they laid a top coat of tarmac and paint for a parade ground. It also fit their image of a low-pollution Earth, being surrounded by flat ground and many trees. The entire structure was about 500 by 300 ft (152 by 91 m) and included an obstacle course and artillery ranges, as well as involving up to 300 extras. About six weeks were spent transforming the site, including adding seventeen pre-fabricated buildings. Another, more-easily accessible location, Barry Barber Ranch near Kadoka, South Dakota and the Badlands National Park, featured little vegetations and smooth, undulating landscape, which could serve as Tango Urilla, where Rico (Casper Van Dien) battles an enormous Tanker bug.

The Buenos Aires-educated center classroom and biology lab sets were built on Sony Studios Stage 23 and filmed in late July. Jenkin's basement set was filmed on Stage 29; it involved a real ferret and features many of Heinlein's books in the background. The jumpball scene was filmed at the Long Beach Pyramid arena. Van Dien, Meyer, and Muldoon performed many of their own stunts for the scene apart from flips and somersaults, but otherwise encouraged each other to "go for it, try to lay me out." The exam results scene and the prom were both filmed at Kaiser Permanente. The Federal Recruitment Center scene and the segment where Rico sees off Carmen were filmed over four days at the Los Angeles Convention Center, which Verhoeven chose because he considered its architecture to be futuristic and clean. Some minor scenes were also filmed at the Park Plaza Hotel.

== The Arachnids ==
=== Design ===
Tippett Studio was mainly responsible for creating the Arachnid, or "bug", race. Phil Tippett had previously worked on Jurassic Park and it was that experience that influenced him to take on the more expansive project with Starship Troopers. Alongside Tippett, artist, engineer, and design expert, Craig Hayes, was suggested by Tippett to aid in designing the bugs, having previously worked with him on RoboCop to design the ED-209. The overall design process was collaborative, and involved Tippett, Hayes, producer Jon Davison, writer Ed Neumeier, and director Paul Verhoeven. The aliens, as described in Heinlein's novel, were "spider-like" but behaved like anthropomorphs and used weaponry such as guns. Although it was suggested that the aliens could be portrayed by actors in costumes and prosthetics, Verhoeven did not want the aliens to use guns, and he, alongside Neumeier, determined they should be large insects instead. Hayes and Tippett began an extended period of bug design, taking some influence from wildlife documentaries, and abandoned designs by Stampede Entertainment of the "Shrieker" creature from Tremors 2: Aftershocks (1996). Based on Verhoeven's requested aesthetic of hard-edged creatures that were not at all cute, but fast and vicious, Hayes developed many of the final designs with input from Tippett, although movement was not accounted for at this stage. Verhoeven stressed that Troopers was first and foremost a war film, Hayes' designs transformed the insects and their armaments into the equivalent of the faceless World War II Axis troops and exaggerated weaponry seen in old Hollywood propaganda films. Wanted to emphasize believability, make them familiar and as realistic as possible. The main directives were that the designs had to allow for dramatic situations and be believable. Verhoeven suggested the Arachnids be biologically organized along various military specializations, and that their kind could breed whatever bug type was required as an organic weapon. Consideration was given to their social framework, based on insects such as bees that would have drones, workers, queens.

Hayes said "We started by breaking the insects down into a bug hierarchy, then into individual groups. We did different drawings of bugs with weird stuff here and there, then fleshed out designs for each particular style. But there was a concerted effort to make them pretty familiar. [Starship Troopers] is not about this fantastic lifeform: the bugs had to be real and grounded so you wouldn't have any trouble telling the good guys from the bad guys." The designs were finalized by the end of 1993, resulting in a variety of bug designs not present in the novel.

The Warriors serve as the ground-based infantry, possessing hardened shells and sharp claws and a beak for attacking, based somewhat on crickets, cockroaches, praying mantis, and staghorn beetles. "The Warriors were modeled on those big rhinoceros or elephant beetles, which have huge chopping jaws," Hayes explains. "We gave them two attack claws up front to help them draw people into their jaws. To make them look really mean, we gave them graphic splash patterns reminiscent of other predatory animals or insects. The Warriors have yellow-orange stripes like wasps and tigers, and a red strip on top of their heads and jaws so you'll hopefully understand which end's up. We also avoided big round soft shapes; everything is pointed. If one stepped on your toe by accident, it would hurt." their feet even terminate in little ice picks!" Tippett adds. "Ironically, the Warriors were also called the Arachnids, but they bear little resemblance to anything that looks like an arachnid, which by definition has eight legs. Craig made sure they only had four, because we had so many Warriors to deal with; keeping the number of their legs down would give us a bit of an advantage. Hayes designed the flying Hopper bugs to appear aerodynamic: "The Hoppers have translucent wings that fold up and fit inside their carapace. They're greenish-blue, with a metallic reflective surface that gives them a futuristic, aerospace feel." The Hoppers were designed as genetically mutated variations of the Warriors, having differently positioned legs and elongated limbs. The Tanker bugs are mobile and can burrow, being likened to "half-track tanks." The creatures emit a "napalm" like plasma or corrosive organic acid from a nozzle between its eyes that is ignited by little spark generators dangling in front. The design was based on the enormous sculpture that comes to life in Jason and the Argonauts, based on Verhoeven's own appreciation for the films of Ray Harryhausen.

The plasma bugs are designed as genetically altered tankers, being slightly larger, greenish-blue with yellow stripes measuring about 85 ft (26 m) tall, described as the aliens ultimate weapon. The creatures produce an explosive liquid via an internal catalytic reaction that is fired from their behinds that can severely damage the spaceships or maneuver asteroids. Hayes based their designs on stinkbugs and fireflies, and Tippett identified a similar real-world creature that repels enemies by mixing two fluids internally that is discharged from its anus. For the Brain Bug, Verhoeven suggested it resemble a queen termite in appearance. Tippett described how Verhoeven thought of the creature as a "Godking, Cthulhu-type thing ... he does the nasty job of sucking people's brains out, so there are some human sacrifices happening." The resulting design was "a bit like a pus sack with flesh-colored, undulating sides" resembling intestines. The Brain Bug is accompanied by the Chariot Bugs, 4 ft (1.2 m) long, cockroach-like creatures designed to act like a mobile carpet supporting the Brain Bug. Tippett described as the "comic relief." The Arkellian Sand Beetles, dissected in the high school biology lab scene, were the only bugs not designed by Tippett Studio. As these creations were not going to involve CGI, their design fell to special effects company, Amalgamated Dynamics (ADI), who joined the production in September 1995, mainly to create practical bug effects. ADI produced a series of sketches based on insects such as sand fleas and scorpions until Verhoeven and ADI creature effects artist Alex Gillis came across the shield bug, which they both liked.

=== Animating the bugs ===
While Tippett Studio intended to mainly use CGI to realize the vast array of bugs, it was by far the biggest project the studio had undertaken by that point. Hayes' designs were translated into partial-scale maquettes and digitized using a custom three-dimensional scanner. The resulting digital models were further refined in Softimage, with high-resolution versions created in Renderman that would actually appear on screen. While most of the bugs were animated using the Silicon Graphics computers using code and manual manipulation, about 30% of the Warrior bugs were animated using the Direct Input Device (DID), a device developed by Hayes for Jurassic Park. The DID allowed for a ball-and-socket animation armature to be linked to a computer via an electronic device, and any movements made to the armature were translated to the digital model a frame at a time. Tippett had been pleased with how the dinosaurs animated using the DID in Jurassic Park had turned out, but believed Starship Troopers would give them an opportunity to improve the results and enhance the technology further. For Troopers, Hayes modified and refined the DID system to make it easier to use. Hayes said, "We did everything we didn't have time to do on Jurassic Park. We built extra armatures, so if anybody's puppet broke, we could swap in a new one and repair the old one. We changed the positions of the encoding devices and sensors, and we streamlined the system and improved the speed of its response quite a bit; everything's much faster. There's only a quarter-second delay from the time the animator moves the DID armature to the point when you can see the result on a monitor. There were three animators using the DID, and they could do pretty tight performances. We put a lot of effort into getting most of the bug parts on the DID armature, though some secondary animation had to be done to add the various smaller attack claws. It usually took a couple of days to animate a shot."

To animate the Warriors, the DID was used to highlight the start and end position of the movements, allowing the software to fill in the gap. Hayes also developed a method for real-time replication of movement by the DID, creating something similar to motion capture, allowing for simple movements such as the bugs moving their jaws to be created efficiently. Tippett described making the Warriors walk as being one of the more difficult aspects due to the uneven nature of the terrain they inhabited. They had to convey the shifting 1,500 lb (680 kg) to 1,800 lb (820 kg) weight of the creatures and moving mass with each step. When depicting a swarm of the bugs on screen, sometimes over 1,200 bugs could be present and so procedural animation techniques such as walking cycles were used to automate aspects of the animation. The cycles were given offsets and pathways to avoid repetitiveness and make the movements of so many bugs appear like "a river of living stuff." The Whiskey Outpost Massacre scene, in which over 1,000 bugs attack the Mobile Infantry on Planet P, was one of the first scenes filmed. Tippett described it as "the most horrific", due to strong winds causing unanticipated camera movements. Correcting the movements digitally took weeks, and the final scene took months due to its 10-second depiction of Warriors and Tankers swarming the base. The sequence was additionally difficult due to taking place in daylight which required detailed tracking of how the light would interact with the bugs as they moved. Hayes and the art department gave the creatures specific surface qualities such as texture and highlights to make them seem more believable in the light. Rendering the scenes was also a lengthy endeavor, taking up to 60 hours to output a single frame, and several months to render the entire 10-second sequence of 240 frames. Tippett Studio eventually refined the process down to about 30 hours to keep the project on schedule.

The carpet bombing of the bugs on Tango Urilla combined live-action and CGI effects and was described as one of the most difficult sequences by Tippett. Richardson set twenty-eight 50-gallon drums filled with high explosives and a plastic back of raw gasoline over 2,500 ft (760 m) in a long valley at Barry Barber Ranch. The barrels were left open on one end so when ignited the flames would exit horizontally, suggesting the forward movement of the 100 ft (30 m) fireballs moving nearly 300 miles per hour, representing explosives dropped by the Earth forces. Nearly 1,000 bugs then had to be animated being vaporized or maimed by the flames. The Tanker bug's acid spray employed CGI to show Birdie's arm melting, leading to a prosthetic stump. The Plasma bug plasma was developed by Tippett using particle system software; once it leaves the planet the plasma is animated by SPI. Animating the Brain bug was difficult because it was more organic and had a flowing body shape compared to the other more hard-bodied variants. The cast faced a lot of difficulty in interacting with creatures that were not present in the scene and had to learn how to act against invisible objects. Various methods were used to help including cardboard cutouts and tennis balls or flags on sticks to indicate their position, as well as Verhoeven wielding a broom.

=== Building the bugs ===
Although the bugs were mainly realized using CGI, some practical creations were required to enhance locations or for the characters to interact with. This responsibility fell mainly to ADI's 70-person team, which built two full-scale hydraulically operated Warrior bugs about 6 or 8 feet tall and 14 feet long, equipped with sophisticated electronics that allowed them to move their bodies or pick up an adult human in their jaws. These were nicknamed Snappy and Mechwar. The painting team studied maquettes provided by Tippett Studio to match the color and shading. An additional ten non-mechanized-but-posable full-scale Warrior models were made to serve as corpses. Each version included about 34 separate parts scaled up and sculpted from the maquettes.

ADI also built a section of the back of a tanker bug onto which Rico jumps when placing an explosive. This was a large two-piece shell mounted on a rig designed by John Richardson, the floor effects supervisor, that let it buck, roll, and shake. ADI manufactured two 28-foot-long hand-painted and detailed fiberglass shells which joined to form the full-scale tanker bug back. A 20-foot-long caterpillar tractor capable of turning on its own axis was concealed underneath and connected together via a network of metal supports, hydraulic rams, and a two-axis gimbal to create side-to-side and up-and-down movement. Van Dien jumped from a hill onto this structure of wooden scaffolding representing its back. Van Dien described riding the shell as a "blast ...I was about 20 feet up in the air secured to the shell by a thin piece of piano wire ... I did chip a tooth at one point, and bruised my ribs. So what? Even though it was intense, it was worth it.

ADI also made nine Arkellian Sand Beetles used for dissecting purposes in the high school. A dozen separate silicon molds with fiberglass jackets, ADI cast 12 positive pieces for each sand beetle, one head, one body, six legs and various mandibles and spines. They measured three feet long by two feet wide. painted and detailed with horse hairs. The main beetle used in the scene, dissected by Van Dien and Richards, was packed with ultraslime and methacyl, plus molded pieces of tinted silicon and foam latex to suggest the bugs intenstines. A thin plastic shell placed over the bugs abdomen for the actors to cut through with a real power tool. Richard's subsequent vomiting in disgust utilized creamed corn. ADI also built a full-scale Brain bug head with mechanical movement functions.

== Spaceships ==
Realizing the wide variety of effects for the spaceship scenes required the efforts of SPI, ILM, and Boss Film Studios. The bulk of these effects, the 120 shots performed by SPI involved about 270 staff throughout development and focused mainly on scenes in orbit above alien worlds, space battles, and dropships travelling through the atmosphere. Jim Martin and SPI art director Michael Scheffe were mainly responsible for the design of the crafts, with Martin providing broad outlines which were given greater detail and a more consistent appearance by Scheffe. Alongside developing the appearance of most of the spacecraft, SPI was also primarily involved in designing the outer space battles. Verhoeven provided ongoing input on the designs, based on what he thought futuristic spaceships would look like, being less streamlined due to the lack of air resistance in space, and taking some influence from compact combat places, such as the de Havilland Mosquito used in World War II. Verhoeven said "I had Second World War sea battles in mind as far as the heaviness of everything and the way they moved... They move like tankers, not speedboats. When the nose of one goes into the side of another ship, it should be as if the Queen Mary was hitting the Titanic. The first thing I told the people making them was that I wanted them to be really heavy, I wanted to always feel the weight of the ships, I wanted to see the motors reacting to something, I wanted nothing to be abrupt because space will not permit faster moves."

"Before shooting began, we choreographed each [sequence using digital] pre-visualization," Anderson states. "After Paul and cinematographer Jost Vacano shot the live-action plates, we went through and started engineering the whole sequence of events around what the live foreground action dictated. The POV was constantly changing, like in a car chase, where you go from behind the wheel to over the bumper to the front of the car as it comes at you. For example, we'd have an interior shot of our heroes on the bridge, and their ship diving toward another starship. Then we'd cut to an exterior and watch the ship you were just on coming toward camera and flying past." He suggested they should be more like aircraft carriers or oil tankers and for the battle scenes to be like car chases with "supertankers", so action was filmed closely and choreographed to have the protagonists avoiding exploding obstacles around them. To distinguish the spacecraft, SPI used three separate "military" colors: gray-green for Army, blue-gray for the Navy, and tan for ground troops. Because of the complexity of some of the outer space scenes, Pixel Liberation Front pre-visualized them using SoftImage 3-D software to create digital animatics, under the supervision of Anderson and visual effects supervisor Dan Radford, to better picture how each scene would be set out. Scenes were further enhanced digitally to add starfields, planets, thrusters, bug plasma, generally resulting in up to 200 different elements making up some shots.

=== Models ===
Thunderstone, SPI's model department, had to construct the various crafts needed, such as dropships and attack fighters, as well as versions that could be destroyed and a full-scale attack fighter for some close-up scenes. Thunderstone helmed by supervisor Phil Nataro and head modelmaker Louis Zutavern and model shop coordinator Frank Vittori. Over 100 model spacecraft built for ST. The larger carrier ships, such as the one Carmen pilots, were dubbed the Rodger Young class, each differentiated by their exterior paint. Various versions were built including five 9 ft (2.7 m) models for various uses including to be destroyed, and an 18 ft (5.5 m) version for more detail. The largest retrieval boat model measures six feet from tip to tip. Various other 22 in (56 cm) models were made to convey the remaining fleet. The various components of the larger model were shared with Boss Film and ILM; Boss Film created a Rodger Young model larger than 18 ft (5.5 m) for interaction with a bug meteor, while ILM built their own 9 ft (2.7 m) and 3 ft (0.91 m) models for the Klendathu sequences. Many of the film's sweeping shots contained about fifty Rodger Young-class ships, combining about 15 miniatures and 100 other digital ships. The digital ships were creating using Alias to model them and Wavefront's TAV choreography for animation, as well as Renderman for rendering.

The collision between the Marshall and Yamamoto ships, among other similar sequences, Anderson filmed multiple spaceships simultaneously with motion control systems to make their work more efficient to meet the timescales. Even filming them altogether resulted in 2,000 selected model elements, although the number would have been up to 6 times higher if they had filmed the ships individually and composited them together. The ship cracking apart was mostly done in-camera using stop-motion, similar to Go-motion, where the motion control system made multiple passes shooting one frame at a time. The 18-inch model was used, and detailed sections of the interior decks were built. Pete Clynel and Paul Jessel animated the decks collapsing, timed to lights set up to mimic explosions, and combined with live action pyro effects from 4 in (10 cm) to 100 ft (30 m) tall. For its final explosion, three different pyro-specific models were blown up. Three motion control units worked over nine months, led by Alex Funke at SIR a rented commercial stage in Culver City.

Cameras mounted on slaved boom arms wheeled around on tracks up to 65 feet in length. For the larger models, rotating mount were built and the largest, the "Gigantor", was about the size of a small truck was built by Barry Walton, head of SPI engineer, the smaller mounts could hold up to 50 lb (23 kg) that could rotate them. Gigantor about 12 ft (3.7 m) across, mainlyused for the 100 lb (45 kg) Rodger Young models. ILM mainly worked on models and motion control photography, including the launch of Dizzy's coffin into space, orbital Klendathu scenes, and a docking umbilical. They had a 3-month schedule to produce their work and assigned two motion control crews solely to the project, accounting for about 160 man-days of filming by about 80 people. ILM constructed their own 9 ft (2.7 m) Rodger Young based on SPI's specifications for some exterior scenes, while ILM collaborated with SPI in constructing the 6 ft (1.8 m) diameter lunar docking ring for the ship. They also built a 3 ft (0.91 m) tall asteroid and a 15 ft (4.6 m) section of the lunar ring with a motorized gun miniature for a scene of it blowing an asteroid apart. ILM also built a 15 ft (4.6 m) section of the Ticonderoga battle station for scenes depicting the embattled fleet of 3 ft (0.91 m) long Rodger Young-style ships returning to safety after defeat at Klendathu. A second Ticonderoga model about 8 ft (2.4 m) tall was started by SPI, which was used for a full view of the station, and finished by ILM.

The fleet training vehicle operated by Carmen was a semi-operational prop, manufactured under the supervision of construction coordinator Stacey McIntosh and foreman Karen Higgins, from steel, plastic, and wood, and weighed nearly 2 short tons (4,000 lb). A cable rig system attached to an off-screen forklift was used to pull the fleet trainer forward, which was on steel rail system about 60 ft (18 m) long, with movement enhanced by practical spark effects and blasts from CO_{2}, plus digital effects by VCE. Close up shots of Carmen in the cockpit were filmed on Stage 29 using a hydraulic gimbal rented from Warner Bros that allowed the fleet trainer, when placed on top, to be maneuvered at various angles. The gimbal was also used for the full scale retrieval boat and lifepod. ILM also produced scenes of Carmen flying the trainer in space, a segment dubbed "Carmen's Wild Ride," combining the CGI movement with a 60 ft (18 m) long and 2 ft (0.61 m) tall model tunnel representing the lunar ring interior.

Boss Film produced about 24 shots for two scenes, mainly related to the Rodger Young, also using motion control filming at Syncro Stages near Van Nuys airport. The main scene was the Rodger Young swooping down towards a miniature ship before moving off as the camera passes into the ship's bridge in a single take. Boss Film used molds of the Rodger Young from SPI to build an 18 ft (5.5 m) miniature. The motion control dive footage was married to the miniature bridge which was then digitally replaced with a more detailed bow and matched to movements of live action footage of Richards on the bridge. Boss Film created a motion control system that allowed the miniature to be hung from the ceiling and moved about. The second scene was the Rodger Young collision with an asteroid. The model was composited with separate footage of an 8 ft (2.4 m) long asteroid hung from the same truss system. For the scene of the ship diving belong the asteroid, a separate 20 ft (6.1 m) long piece of asteroid was built and combined with an 8 ft (2.4 m) model of the ship's tower. It was placed on a runway at Van Nuys airport and used aircannons and bungee cords to pull it apart.

The full-scale Rodger Young bridge was about 20 ft (6.1 m) wide and 40 ft (12 m) long with functioning command stations with lights, seats, plexiglass windows, and a rotating central pillar which represented the atomic power source. A special gimbal had to be constructed to maneuver the set because the rented one was too small. A large, single-axis gimbal made mainly of steel and measuring 40 ft × 50 ft (12 m × 15 m) and weighing 20,000 lb (9,100 kg) that could support up to 60,000 lb (27,000 kg) in the form of sets, actors, and equipment. The gimbal could tilt at a 20-degree angle using a system of hydraulic rams on either side of the bridge, meaning the front end of the Rodger Young could be raised about 25 ft (7.6 m) in only a few seconds, creating a dynamic action for the actors instead of them pretending to throw themselves around. A scene of a compartment on the shop being blown open, dubbed the "upside down set" was filmed in a full-scale set representing crew compartments built upside down. Stunt people were attached to the set using braided steel wires and harnesses which were released to show them falling with a fan descender. They landed on a 7 ft (2.1 m) tall air bag which made them look like they were being sucked up out of the frame. The dropship descent on to Klendathu was accomplished by building the dropship interior atop truck tire inner tubes, vibrating mecahnics, and hydraulic rams to create violent motions.

== Design ==
=== Costumes ===
Costume designer Ellen Mirojnick and costume supervisor Nick Scarano oversaw the costumes for Starship Troopers. The project was substantial, requiring uniforms for the various military branches including Mobile Infantry and Fleet Pilots, and the varied designs within each branch. About 2,300 costumes were made. Initially there were only 30 staff and so the work had to be contracted out, mainly to Proper Effects, which produced 1,000 Mobile Infantry uniforms, 1,000 trooper helmets, 1,500 boots and 800 trooper vests which underwent repairs, cleaning, and recycling throughout filming. Steve Burg and Jim Lima designed the initial concepts for the outfits which were further refined by Cameron and Martin. Verhoeven did not want the armor to be futuristic despite the setting, especially after the power armor was dropped. He wanted them to be functional so the designs began with utilitarian features, such as pockets, heavy boots, and protective helmets. Design influence was taken Nazi Wehrmacht-inspired uniforms and insignia of field grade officers, while Military Intelligence uniforms were reminiscent of Mussolini's Blackshirts. Neumeier said the Nazi uniforms were used, in part, because "the Germans made the best-looking stuff," but Verhoeven also wanted to use that aesthetic in "an artistic way."

Cameron determined the fabrics would combine woven nylon and polyurethane rubber because it would provide the soldiers a degree of protection. The protective MI vest worn across the chest and back caused problems because it had been designed as a lightweight body armor to protect against claws, but it was too heavy and impractical. It went through four revisions until the final version, which had the right aesthetic but was very uncomfortable to wear to their weight (22 lb (10.0 kg)) and their heat retention in the already-hot filming location. The total weight of each outfit, including helmet and vest, was about 45 lb (20 kg) but satisfied the design requirements of being visually interesting. In 2001, the helmets were reused for the gorilla SWAT team in the ending scene of Tim Burton's Planet of the Apes.

=== Graphics ===
The infantry tattoos worn by Rico and his team were designed by the art department. They were manufactured as alcohol transfers, inked silk screen designs on paper backing that were saturated with alcohol to transfer the image onto the skin, and the outline was filled with colored, alcohol based inks. The effect was completed with CGI lasers applying the tattoos by VCE. About 50 "Death from Above" transfers made by Reel Creations makeup company.

The eagle logo on the flag was designed by Verhoeven and Cameron, using a stylised bird on a green and gold banner, that combines the American eagle with a "warlike-looking" airplane. The UCF flag, bearing an eagle, resembles that of the Nazi coat of arms, officer uniforms resemble those worn by the Nazi secret police, the Gestapo, including the insignia, and the infantry uniforms bear a symbol similar to Mussolini's Blackshirts. Graphics shown on in-universe screens, including the interface for the FedNet sequences, were provided by Banned from the Ranch Entertainment (BFtR) under graphics supervisor Van Ling. The Rodger Young bridge featured about nine monitors each displaying a few different graphics, and about 48 graphics in total for those scenes. Shockwave Entertainment assisted in translating BFtR's graphics to the monitors by playing them back using videotape playback.

=== Technology ===
The magnetic rail train system that carries Carmen away from Rico was designed by art director Bruce Hill to resemble a pneumatic banking system. Cameron and Verhoeven increased the size of the system to imply it can transport passengers worldwide via an underground network. Live-action footage of Richards stepped onto a full-scale train replica was filmed at the L.A. Convention Center, and VCE built a digital environment around the prop. After being wounded in battle, Rico's leg injury is suspended in a large water tank and treated by an automated medical device that stitches his wound closed. Made from iron and plexiglass by Richardson's team, the tank was about 10 ft × 10 ft (3.0 m × 3.0 m) and held 1,200 U.S. gal (4,500 L) of water that, when filled, weighed close to six tonnes. A transparent plexiglass seat cast from Van Dien's body was used to hold the actor steady in the water. Richardson also built the automated medical device, which was enhanced with CGI by VCE. The scene was shot three times: the tank with only a prosthetic leg cast from Van Dien's own, the tank with Van Dien in it, and the tank with the medical device which were composited together.

The reveal of the student exam results was filmed at the Kaiser Permanente Center in Baldwin Park, California. A 7 ft × 10 ft (2.1 m × 3.0 m) television screen was installed for the sequence, as part of a sophisticated Triple Light-Valve high definition rear projection system. Effectively, an industrial-use projector used normally for trade and sports functions, provided by American Hi Definition Inc.

The fictional Morita Rifle is the standard weapon for the Mobile Infantry. It was named by Neumeier for Sony executive, Akio Morita, as a sign of respect. Richardson had worked on Aliens (1986) which dressed real firearms with various appliances to make them appear futuristic, which helped him in developing the weapons for Starship Troopers. The Morita Rifle was based on a Pancor Jackhammer shotgun. The art department designed the casing to hold a shotgun and automatic machine gun, and a company named WKR produced several Morita casings from fiberglass. Weapons coordinator Rock Galotti used a Ruger AC556 machine gun for the upper weapon and the 12-gauge Ithaca Stakeout shotgun for the bottom. The weapons were taken out of their own casings and mounted in the Morita casings as Richardson had experienced difficulties after leaving the Thompson machine guns inside the Aliens guns with the casings on. A strong bracket was designed to mount both weapons to prevent the weight of the shotgun bending the machine gun barrel. The triggers were relocated further forward onto the Morita casings because the Ruger had a rear-mounted magazine feed. The casings were open to eject rounds and provide ventilation as otherwise the weapons could heat up to 750 °F (399 °C) and melt the fiberglass shells. Finally, 19 to 20 inch barrel extensions were added, making the overall weapon around 32 inches. In total, making the weapons involved 70 fully-automatic Rugers, 50 semi-automatic Rugers (Rugers Mini-14s), 25 Ithaca shotguns, and several hundred non-functional rubber Moritas for extras. Use of the weapons involved substantial training on location in Wyoming and South Dakota, as well as a Beverly Hills gun club, plus gallons of weapon cleaner, 450 aerosol cans, and lubricant plus over 300,000 rounds of blank ammunition. The miniature nuclear weapon launcher was modelled after a 1950s German Panzerfaust anti-tank rocket launcher.

=== Makeup and prosthetics ===
Kevin Yagher Productions was responsible for the prosthetic appliances and makeup used in Starship Troopers. For Starship Troopers, the company provided artificial metal hands, wounds, amputated limbs, wounds, intestines, melted flesh and detailed half-torso puppets, about forty background bodies or parts of corpses. At its peak, the company had 28 crew dedicated to the film. Various background bodies started as liquid polyfoam poured into human-sized molds, cast up and then carved and sculpted into full-scale bodies. Severed limbs were made by hacking limbs off the full molds and covering them in silicone. The bodies had wigs, fake eyes and teeth, and were often redressed and reused for different purposes.

For Jean Raszcak's missing forearm, a mold was made from Michael Ironside's arm and a clay sculpt formed within it. This was reduced down to a stump which was again cast in a mold and filled with silicon tinted with dyes to appear flesh colored. The resulting arm was painted and fitted with human hairs by Thorn Floutz. The prosthetic was turned into a rod-controlled puppet attached at Ironside's shoulder with a harness, allowing him to control the movements using a control rod in his hand concealed behind his back. For some scenes, Ironside wore a gray sock over his forearm which was digitally removed by VCE. For the robotic hand worn by Raszcak and the Earth-based recruitment officer (Robert David Hall), this was effectively a urethane foam glove covered in a tougher form of urethane painted to resemble steel plates.

When Cadet Breckinridge's (Eric Bruskotter) arm is broken by Sgt. Zim (Clancy Brown), the arm was a fiberglass replica covered in painted silicone, with Bruskotter putting his arm behind his back. Sgt. Zim later follows up by stabbing Ace Levy (Jake Busey) through the hand. For this, Busey was fitted with a prosthetic hand and arm made from a mold of his real arm and cast in fiberglass with silicone skin. This arm had internal mechanisms made from nylon and aluminium allowing the wrist and fingers to be manipulated to enhance the realism. Again his hand was behind him and the prosthetic was attached at the shoulder with a harness made from neoprene. The knife was launched with a custom device engineered by Richardson resembling a slingshot, made from steel and rubber surgical tubing. Rue McClanahan's scarred face was a gelatine-based prosthetic appliance.

For the death of Breckinridge, a life cast was made of Bruskotter's head using dental alginate. A fiberglass skull was made for the dummy with glass eyes and human hair, and wrapped in silicon and painted. The skull offered remote-controlled mechanical movements for the eyes and jaw. Polyfoam torso. To blow his head off, a thin monofilament fishing line was attached to a pre-scored section on top of the head and just pulled it. Compressed air was used to blow fake blood and brains out of the wound, made from stage blood, methylcellulose, mashed bananas and cereal. The death of Shujumi involved a one-legged stuntman doubling for Anthony Ruivivar (after Shujumi's leg had just been bitten off), attached to a harness and hung upside down from the jaws of the MechWar practical Warrior bug and shaken violently. The stuntman said he became nauseous and wanted to throw up but to avoid ruining the shot, swallowed it. The death is enhanced with a CGI effect of Shujumi being bitten in half. For Katrina's death, stuntwoman Donna Evans fell into a pre-dug hole filmed at Hell's Half Acre. Several months later, Katrina's actress, Blake Lindsley, was filmed being pulled out of frame by rope on a large 16 ft × 12 ft (4.9 m × 3.7 m) set recreation of the Hell's Half Acre footage, called "Katrina's Pit." The dismemberment of Kitten Smith (Matt Levin) was accomplished using a realistic dummy molded from Levin which was lifted using the Snappy Warrior prop; CGI is used to show him being cut fully in half. The Whiskey Outpost massacre involved polyfoam human bodyparts, full-scale fiberglass Warriors, and a Chariot Bug built by Ron Holztheisen of Scientific Arts Studio, the only practical bug not built by ADI. A soldier with his brain sucked out was also a polyfoam dummy with a fiberglass cavity in its skull that was filled with Ultraslime and fake blood. Leading up to Rico's leg injury, Kevin Yagher Productions, ADI, and Tippett Studio collaborated. ADI cast a full-scale fiberglass Warrior upper jaw with the sharp tip removed. This was slammed onto Van Dien's thigh, from which Tippett Studio was able to make a CGI tip penetrating the leg, and an open wound prosthetic was created by Kevin Yagher Productions.

== Sound ==
Sound designers Steve Flick and John Pospisil started working on the sounds for Starship Troopers in 1995. For the Arachnids, the pair deliberately avoided researching mammalian noises and instead began collecting various natural sounds that interested them. They worked with Lang Elliot, a fellow at Cornell University, known as a specialist in birds and insects. Elliot supplied Flick and Pospisil with his collection of insect, bird, and frog recordings for Starship Troopers.

For the Warriors, Flick and Pospisil wanted a "drier" sound because they deemed them to be akin to crabs, which are chitinous and makes clicking sounds as it walks. The Warriors also include a range of bird and insect noises, including crickets, cockroaches, and, despite their intent to avoid them, some mammalian sounds. The larger Tanker bugs used walrus and seal calls, and the Chariot bugs used baby racoons suckling which was modified electronically.
