= The Messenger (2015 British film) =

- Film poster
- Directed by: David Blair
- Written by: Andrew Kirk
- Produced by: Richard Hart; Michael Knowles; Terry Stone; Richard Turner
- Starring: Robert Sheehan; Lily Cole
- Cinematography: Ian Moss
- Edited by: Ulrike Münch
- Music by: Ian Livingstone
- Production companies: Gateway Films; Ratio Films
- Distributed by: Metrodome Distribution
- Release date: 20 June 2015 (Edinburgh)
- Running time: 101 minutes
- Country: United Kingdom
- Language: English

The Messenger is a 2015 British supernatural mystery horror film directed by David Blair, written by Andrew Kirk and starring Robert Sheehan and Lily Cole.

== Plot ==
After his father's death, a suicide by hanging, young Jack seemingly gains the ability to see and talk with souls who have not yet "gone into the light." As Jack grows older, these souls ask him to become their 'Messenger' and relay their final words to those still living. This usually ends badly; as more often than not Jack's words, though honest, cause more misery and result in him getting kicked out of funerals or beaten up. Jack states time and time again that he isn't doing it out of the goodness of his heart, but in an effort to get rid of the souls haunting him, which doesn't happen until the task is completed.

It is shown through intermediate flashbacks that, as a child, Jack had been in and out of psychiatric clinics and hospitals all through adulthood, and as of the present, has been skimping on his prescribed medication. This, along the fact that he constantly drinks, has his current soul companion, a high-profile reporter by the name of Mark, worrying that his message to his recently widowed wife, Sarah, won't be genuinely received. Mark discloses that he was jumped on his way home by hooded figures and killed, staged to look like a suicide. He convinces Jack to reach out to his wife and tell her goodbye, while also revealing the fact that he knows about the baby growing inside her; this causes Sarah to become distressed, as the baby isn't Mark's. Jack, frustrated at how he's made the situation worse again, is taken into custody in response to Sarah's call to the police.

Jack is taken to see a psychiatrist and is made to retell his story, eventually discovering that his father hadn't killed himself because of his mother, but that he was projecting his own bitterness and hatred for her. Seconds after he accepts help, Mark returns and insists that Jack help Sarah, who is attempting suicide by overdose. Jack initially refuses but relents when it becomes too much, eventually screaming hysterically for everyone to send help. He's sedated and taken away, though in the end, Jack's warnings stand true and the emergency response saved Sarah's life. Though the psychiatrist refutes the idea that his powers are real, saying that it's his mind trying to cope with his father's violent death, both the constable and Jack's sister, Emma, begin to believe in his powers. Afterwards Emma brings Jack a crystallized bug globe, a memento of their father, and Jack finally moves on from his father's death, crying and accepting help.

During the story it is discovered that Jack's nephew, Billy, also sees lost souls, but has never told anyone. He discloses that he's haunted by the ghost of a boy who drowned in his family's swimming pool. The story ends with the reappearance of Billy and the ghost, while, at the same time, Emma, in the midst of cleaning Jack's apartment, finds a newspaper clipping detailing the death of a boy in her swimming pool.

== Cast ==
- Robert Sheehan as Jack
- Lily Cole as Emma
- Joely Richardson as Psychiatrist
- Tamzin Merchant as Sarah
- David O'Hara as DCI Keane
- Deirdre O'Kane as Mum
- Andrew Tiernan as Father
- Jack Fox as Mark
- Alex Wyndham as Martin
- Ali Cook as Geoff

== Production ==
The film was shot in the United Kingdom, including the Peak District.

== Release ==
The Messenger premiered at the Edinburgh International Film Festival on 20 June 2015.

== Reception ==
On the review aggregator website Rotten Tomatoes, 33% of 18 critics' reviews are positive, with an average rating of 4.4/10.

David Clack in Time Out gave it one star (out of five), "The Messenger offers not a single fresh idea, nor the faintest glimmer of hope that something smart is around the corner". Steve Rose in The Guardian gave it two stars out of five, "told in a slow, fragmented manner that becomes frustrating rather than mystifying".
