= Saving Santa =

2013 animated Christmas film

- Film poster
- Directed by: Leon Joosen; Aaron Seelman
- Screenplay by: Ricky Roxburgh
- Story by: Tony Nottage
- Produced by: Terry Stone; Nick Simunek; Carolyn Bennett
- Starring: Martin Freeman; Tim Curry; Noel Clarke; Tim Conway; Pam Ferris; Ashley Tisdale; Joan Collins
- Music by: Grant Olding; Mark Yaeger
- Production companies: The Weinstein Company; Gateway Films; Prana Studios
- Distributed by: The Weinstein Company (United States and the United Kingdom); Cinema Management Group (International)
- Release date: 1 November 2013
- Running time: 83 minutes
- Countries: United Kingdom; United States; Canada; India
- Language: English
- Box office: $9,278,821

Saving Santa is a 2013 animated Christmas musical comedy film created and written by Tony Nottage and directed by Leon Joosen, produced by Tony Nottage, Terry Stone, and Nick Simunek. The film was released direct-to-video.

== Synopsis ==
A lowly stable elf finds that he is the only one who can stop an invasion of the North Pole by using the secret of Santa's Sleigh, a TimeGlobe, to travel back in time to Save Santa, twice.

== Plot ==
To be continued

== Voice cast ==
- Martin Freeman as Bernard D. Elf, the main protagonist of the film.
- Tim Curry as Neville Baddington, the former antagonist of the film, and a terrorist.
- Noel Clarke as Snowy, the investigating officer of the Christmas Defense Department.
- Tim Conway as Santa Claus, the Titular character. Tom Baker starred as Santa Claus in UK releases of the movie.
- Pam Ferris as Mrs. Claus, Santa’s Spouse.
- Ashley Tisdale as Shiny, the female officer.
- Joan Collins as Vera Baddington, Neville’s biological mother, and the antagonist.
- Nicholas Guest as Blitzen, Chestnut, the CEO and manager of SanTech.
- Richard Steven Horvitz as Orange Haired Elf and Chestnut
- Rebecca Ferdinando as Valley Girl Elf
- Craig Fairbrass as The Mercenary
- Terry Stone as Mercenary
- Alex Walkinshaw as Reporter

== Release ==
It was released in the United Kingdom on November 1, 2013 and the United States on November 5, 2013 on Blu-ray and DVD by The Weinstein Company and Anchor Bay Entertainment.

== Reception ==
The film received negative critical reviews. On review aggregator Rotten Tomatoes, the film holds a score of 17% based on six critical reviews.

== See also ==
- List of Christmas films
- Santa Claus in film
