= My Family series 5 =

British television series

My Family
- Series 5
- My Family Series 5 DVD Cover
- No. of episodes: 13 + Christmas Special 2004 + Christmas Special 2005 + Best of Special

Release
- Original network: BBC
- Original release: 12 March 2004 – 25 December 2005

Series chronology
- ← Previous; 4 Next → 6

The fifth series of the BBC family sitcom My Family originally aired between 19 March 2004 and 25 December 2005. The series was commissioned following consistently high ratings for the fourth series. The opening episode of the series, "The Mummy Returns", re-introduces the six main characters from the previous series, as well as Janey, played by Daniela Denby-Ashe, who had not been seen on-screen since December 2002. The fifth series includes four specials: two-hour long Christmas specials, a 30-minute "best-of" special, and an exclusive 5-minute Comic Relief short. All thirteen regular episodes from the fifth series are thirty minutes in length. The series was once again produced by Rude Boy Productions, a company that produces comedies created by Fred Barron. The series was filmed at Pinewood Studios in London, in front of a live audience.

== Episode Information ==
No. overall	No. in series	Title	Directed by	Written by	Original release date	UK viewers (millions)
Special
50	S	"Reloaded"	Dewi Humphreys	Andrea Solomons	12 March 2004	7.50
Susan is lying in bed, bored and depressed, with a broken leg, after Ben accidentally reversed the car into her. When Ben comes upstairs to see how she is they end up discussing their family, which depresses them both. They start arguing when Ben surprises her with a box of Turkish Delight, which he didn't know, she hates. The topic of conversation changes numerous times as they both discuss Nick, Janey and Michael and also reminisce on the arrival of Abi and Roger's pathetic attempts at asking her out. When Ben gets bored and decides to go downstairs he finds he can't, as his back has gone thus he and Susan are both stuck. Note: This clip show format episode is not on the Series 5 DVD release and the Comic Relief 2005 sketch isn't included on the DVD as a Special feature.
Series
51	1	"The Mummy Returns"	Dewi Humphreys	James Hendrie and Ian Brown	19 March 2004	9.17
Janey returns home, having been thrown out of Manchester University, but tells Ben and Susan she dropped out. However, Susan soon finds out that the Police are looking for her, and then Susan lies when they turn up at the house, but it turns out the policeman (Gareth Ferdinando) turns out to be an old fling. Also, Janey moves into her own flat, to the delight of Ben. Meanwhile, Michael goes religious with a new friend called Hubert (Alex Dawson) and Abi gets involved in naturism thanks to Ben's misguided advice and the fact that he held back information for his own amusement. Also, Ben offers some fatherly advice when it is not needed. Absent: Roger Bailey JR Return Episode: Janey Harper
52	2	"You Don't Know Jack"	Dewi Humphreys	Andrea Solomons	26 March 2004	7.69
Michael gets a "cool" new friend called Jack (Michael Obiora), who gives Michael street cred while he does Jack's homework to his mother's disgust. Jack gets a crush on Susan, which Michael encourages, while Ben simply focuses on the fact that he shares an interest in football and Slade with Jack. However, Jack's interest in Susan begins to bother her up until Ben points out what a life with Susan means – this soon puts him off. Meanwhile, someone's going on a double date, Janey's sharing her fashion tips with Abi, even though she couldn't care less and Michael enjoys being part of the cool crowd although he's not enjoying the additional work. Absent: Roger Bailey JR
53	3	"What's Up, Docklands?"	Dewi Humphreys	James Hendrie and Ian Brown	2 April 2004	7.24
Ben and Susan flat-sit for their friends Geoff (Simon Kunz) and Stephanie (Caroline Loncq) in the London Docklands, whilst they go on holiday. They have problems with the technology, get lost while looking for the pizza man (Toby Sedgwick), set fire to the TV whilst smashing up the rest of the flat looking for the toilet. Ben then decides that they could swap all the broken stuff from their flat with the unsold flat downstairs but Susan disagrees. When the pizza finally arrives, Ben cannot unlock the door, so the pizza man pushes it through the letter box, however, it is cold, so Ben heats it up, but it catches fire and they have to throw it out of the window. They later ring up their friends and pretend that there has been a break in and that they got tied up to escape the blame. Absent: Janey Harper, Michael Harper, Abi Harper, Roger Bailey JR, Kenzo Harper
54	4	"Luck Be a Lady Tonight"	Dewi Humphreys	James Hendrie and Ian Brown	16 April 2004	7.63
Roger becomes depressed when Abi starts going out with a man called Steve (Ben Homewood), so Ben and Susan try to help Roger get a girlfriend so he can make Abi jealous. However, Roger ends up with an escort girl (Lucy Punch) who charges him two hundred pounds an hour. Meanwhile, Abi is being mistreated by her boyfriend as he is making her clean his house and clean out the drains. Also, Michael gets the house valued and starts to show people around much to his parents' disbelief, whilst Roger reveals that he actually likes using escorts because there is absolutely no commitment, which suits him just fine. Ben and Susan soon realise that they must try to protect Roger. Absent: Janey Harper, Kenzo Harper
55	5	"First Past the Post"	Dewi Humphreys	James Hendrie and Ian Brown	23 April 2004	7.58
Following the death of their local councillor, Susan attempts to stand as an independent candidate in the by-election. She starts to work on the issues of street hygiene and speed bumps. She later suggests changes her middle name to the more statesman-like "Barrington". Meanwhile, Roger wins The Times crossword again, so Ben then tries to do the same thing but ends up massively disappointed until the name Harper finally appears in the winners column – the only thing is that Roger's entered his crossword under the name Abi Harper. Also, Michael loses his pet tarantula called Nicola to everybody's annoyance.
56	6	"My Will Be Done"	Dewi Humphreys	Andrea Solomons	30 April 2004	6.05
Following the death of Susan's best friend Linda, she thinks about mortality. A website that she checks then gives Ben sixty-seven weeks to live, so he decides to write a will and makes Roger Michael's guardian if Ben dies. Also, Nick comes back from travelling on the Circle Line for six months, and gets a job as an Official Mourner at a local undertakers, which he loses when he steals a coffin, crashes three hearses and embalms his own leg. Meanwhile, Janey plans to be a rich woman and Abi becomes a rich woman when Ben reveals that he is going to leave everything to her when he dies. Absent: Kenzo Harper Guest Return: Nick Harper (1st of 3 appearances)
57	7	"My Fair Charlady"	Dewi Humphreys	Steve Armogida and Jim Armogida	7 May 2004	8.13
Susan gets fed up with doing all the housework, so she hires a super-efficient cleaner called Martha (Vicki Pepperdine). However, Susan soon feels redundant and much to Ben's annoyance, she says Martha has to go, which means that Ben has the job of firing her but when he finds out that Susan has been deliberately messing up the house he decides to keep her on. Meanwhile, Michael gets interested in football to impress a girl and Abi learns the dictionary, with Roger's help, to get a job at the college library. Also, Ben hires Martha so that she can clean his surgery however when Susan finds out he is forced the sack her again, so Roger hires her. Absent: Janey Harper, Kenzo Harper
58	8	"The Mouthtrap"	Dewi Humphreys	Andrea Solomons	14 May 2004	6.53
Mr Addis (Gerard Horan), a patient of Ben's, confesses to murdering his wife (Suzanne Burden) while under sedation, so Susan uses her new-found interest in Inspector Morse to prove he committed the crime, much to Ben's dismay. Also, Michael claims his new girlfriend (Ulla van Zeller) is a supermodel, although nobody believes him. Meanwhile, Susan's investigation gets out of hand when she breaks into Mr Addis' house. However, Susan is confronted by his wife who sits her down and eventually breaks conversation with her. She reveals that her husband has problems with crime dramas. She admits that he has been watching A Touch of Frost much too often. Absent: Janey Harper, Kenzo Harper
59	9	"While You Weren't Sleeping"	Dewi Humphreys	Darin Henry	21 May 2004	7.40
Ben's snoring starts to keep Susan awake so as first attempt at getting him to stop she sews tennis balls to the back of his top but Ben simply refuses to wear it, so they sleep in separate rooms, which puts the whole house under pressure. Meanwhile, Abi begins to think that she is the cause of Ben and Susan's unhappiness whilst a chat to with Ben seems to only confirm her worst fears. Also, Janey becomes a personal shopper for the other family members and changes Michael and Abi's wardrobes against their will. But something weird is about to conclude all the mayhem – Ben is about to display some happiness. Absent: Kenzo Harper
60	10	"Dentist to the Stars"	Dewi Humphreys	James Cary	28 May 2004	4.48
Colin Judd (Peter Capaldi), a famous Hollywood actor, comes to Ben's surgery, much to Ben's delight. But before the actor's second visit, Ben hurts his back. Roger begins treating the actor and all of Ben's famous patients—including Jude Law and Kevin Spacey—and is invited to a special celebrity film-wrap party, which leaves Ben distraught. Susan—sacked as tour guide—reapplies for the job to maintain her pride, but she finds that she must revise first. Michael is doing history coursework. Ben, left alone in the house in his paralysed state, struggles to help himself—all he wants is a glass of water: but has everyone actually left the house? Absent: Kenzo Harper
61	11	"A Wife Less Ordinary"	Dewi Humphreys	Sophie Hetherington	4 June 2004	4.98
When Susan gets bored with her predictable life, she finds herself life swapping with Janey for a week. With Susan living at Janey's flat and Janey moving into the Harper household trouble isn't that distant. Ben then moves into his dental surgery and he and Susan recreate their first date, whilst Janey goes mad pretending she is a housewife with an imaginary husband much to Michael and Abi's fear. Also, Abi brings her boyfriend, Michael, around but he soon leaves after hearing some poisonous rumours about Abi from Michael. Meanwhile, Ben struggles to enjoy his people-free life style and soon wants to return home, but does Susan? Absent: Kenzo Harper
62	12	"The Book of Love"	Dewi Humphreys	Steve Armogida and Jim Armogida	11 June 2004	5.19
Susan joins a book club started by her neighbour, John Griffin (Paul Bradley), but when it turns out to consist of him and Susan, she begins to worry. Then he tries to seduce her, but she goes back a second time so she doesn't have to admit she was wrong, as Ben told her what Griffin would do. Meanwhile, Roger buys some very expensive Coldplay tickets from Michael to impress Abi but loses them and has to buy some more however Abi soon twigs what is happening and threatens Michael who then pretends to have found Roger's lost tickets, and Janey becomes Ben's dental assistant and takes Kenzo (Thomas and Noah Davis) to work with her much to Ben's annoyance.
63	13	"Going Dental"	Dewi Humphreys	James Hendrie and Ian Brown	18 June 2004	5.62
When Susan refuses to go to Ben's dental conference at an expensive hotel because she is trying to write a novel, Janey goes instead. Everyone thinks Janey is Ben's mistress, and Ben goes along with this so he can get an important business partnership. Abi also goes to the conference to be with Roger, and Susan, Michael and Hubert soon end up there as well leading to a hectic few hours for Ben. The trouble then gets more intense as Janey reveals to Susan that Ben wanted her to pretend to be his mistress which leaves Susan in a foul mood. Also, Ben tries to get Abi to pretend to be his mistress but Roger isn't going to let her. Guest starring Windsor Davies.
Specials
64	S	"Glad Tidings We Bring"	Dewi Humphreys	Andrea Solomons, James Hendrie and Ian Brown	24 December 2004	8.91
Janey gets engaged to Ches Rochester (Danny Webb), a nightclub owner who is old enough to be her father, whom she has only known 10 days, but a psychic told her she would meet the love of her life at a wedding. They marry two weeks later at his house and Susan is worried about Ben giving the "father of the bride" speech. Meanwhile, Michael's girlfriend Molly (Verity Dearsley) is into long-term plans. At the wedding, Grace and Ches' father (Freddie Davies) dance together, while Michael and Hubert sell the wedding presents on eBay. But, shortly after marrying, Janey goes off with a waiter called Lars (Mathew Bose) and asks for a divorce. Meanwhile, Nick is sending videos to Ben and Susan claiming to be destitute in the Far East and asks for money. Guest starring Edna Doré. Guest Episode: Nick Harper (2nd of 3 appearances)
*	S	"Comic Relief Special"	Dewi Humphreys	Fred Barron, Ian Brown and James Hendrie	11 March 2005	N/A
There is a thunderstorm going on, and after being scared Michael and Janey join Ben and Susan in their bedroom. They are soon joined by Nick who, thanks to now being a party reviewer, brings with him Adam Hart-Davis, Anthony Head, Myleene Klass, Nell McAndrew, Dermot Murnaghan, Clive Russell and Jamie Theakston. Guest Episode and Last Appearance: Nick Harper (3rd of 3 appearances)
65	S	"...And I'll Cry If I Want to"	Dewi Humphreys	Paul Minett and Brian Leveson.	25 December 2005	5.85
Susan is organising a third birthday for Kenzo, partly to make up for the fact she got forgot Janey's third birthday, and wants Janey to bring the father. She wants to hire an expensive clown, but Ben secretly asks Roger to do it instead. However, on the day, Christmas Eve, Roger gets drunk so Ben has to do it instead. Meanwhile, Welsh musician Alfie Butts (Rhodri Meilir), a friend of Nick's, turns up and Susan insists he stay. Ben finds a £1200 ring which he thinks is for him from Susan, but is actually from Grace to her toyboy (John Burgess), so he goes out and buys Susan a £1200 first edition of Mrs Dalloway. Also, Michael gets a Christmas job as a postman and Abi becomes a beautician. First Episode: Alfie Butts

== Reception ==
=== Viewers ===
The series was once again given a prime-time Friday evening slot, with most episodes airing at 8:30pm. The first episode of the series gained 9.17 million viewers, considerably more than episodes in the previous series, becoming the most watched programme for the week. Ratings for the series were consistent, however, two episodes failed to reach the 5 million mark, and the Christmas special failed to attract more than 5.5 million viewers. However, ratings were good enough for a sixth series of eight episodes to be commissioned.

Rank	Episode	Viewership	Audience Percentage
1	The Mummy Returns	9.17 million	
2	Glad Tidings We Bring	8.91 million	
3	My Fair Charlady	8.13 million	
4	You Don't Know Jack	7.69 million	
5	Luck Be a Lady Tonight	7.63 million	
6	First Past the Post	7.58 million	
7	My Family Reloaded	7.50 million	
8	While You Weren't Sleeping	7.40 million	
9	What's Up, Docklands?	7.24 million	
10	The Mouthtrap	6.53 million	
11	My Will Be Done	6.05 million	
12	Going Dental	5.62 million	
13	...And I'll Cry If I Want to	5.85 million	
14	The Book of Love	5.19 million	
15	A Wife Less Ordinary	4.98 million	
16	Dentist to the Stars	4.48 million	
