= The Firm (2009 film) =

- Theatrical release poster
- Directed by: Nick Love
- Screenplay by: Nick Love (adaptation)
- Based on: The Firm screenplay by Al Hunter Ashton
- Produced by: Rhys Dow
- Starring: Calum MacNab; Paul Anderson; Daniel Mays; Doug Allen; Camille Coduri
- Cinematography: Matt Gray
- Edited by: Stuart Gazzard
- Music by: Laura Rossi
- Production company: Vertigo Films
- Distributed by: Warner Bros. Pictures
- Release date: 18 September 2009
- Running time: 90 minutes
- Country: United Kingdom
- Language: English
- Box office: £686,502

The Firm is a 2009 British drama film based around football hooliganism written and directed by Nick Love. It is a remake of the original 1989 version.

== Plot ==
Bex is the leader of the West Ham United football firm, that travels up and down the country, to places such as Portsmouth, to fight other firms. Dom is a normal young lad who hangs around with his mates, and one night they go to a nightclub, Lips, where his friend Tel walks into Bex after Bex walks straight to the front of the line and bumps Tel's shoulder. After the two share words in Lips, Bex headbutts Tel in the face and offers out his friends afterwards.

The morning after, Tel tells Dom that Bex is after them and that they have been named to Bex. The two then go to the local pub, the Lord Nelson, where the firm hangs out and meets. There, Dom apologises for the two of them, explaining that they did not have any idea who Bex was and that they would have 'swerved' him if they knew. Bex compliments Dom's courage, saying that he has a lot of guts ("bottle") to walk in and face him. Tel and Dom mimic Bex as they stand outside of the pub afterwards.

Dom later finds out where Bex works, an estate agent in a precinct called Hunter Ashton and Clarke (a homage to Al Hunter Ashton and Alan Clarke), and goes to visit him. They become acquaintances, visiting a sports shop where Bex purchases a pair of Adidas Munich trainers, telling Dom that 'there is only one trainer', and asks the shop worker to send a yellow Sergio Tacchini track top over to his office. He then asks Dom if he wants to play in his football team, telling him to wear some sensible 'clobber' as he is not a Leeds pikey. Dom accepts. Dom asks his Dad for money to buy the same pair of trainers.

Dom arrives late at the football game and is put in goal. He lets in a goal due to not concentrating. After he saves a vital penalty, the rest of the boys begin to take a liking to him, especially Jay, who asks if he is coming to Portsmouth at the weekend and tells him that he played 'a blinder'. Dom agrees. Trigger, the firm's second-in-command, visits Bex at work in his Porsche, where he tells him that Millwall's firm and Portsmouth's firm are meeting to discuss the up-and-coming matches between the three teams.

Bex walks in on the meeting, at a pub, to pitch his idea of the three firms coming together to form a national firm for the UEFA European Football Championship. The pitch fails, with Millwall and Portsmouth's top boys refusing to stand behind Bex in the national firm unless he and his firm can beat theirs in the upcoming meets. Saturday comes and the firm are at the station getting a train to Portsmouth. When they get there they meet the Portsmouth firm at the pub. Police arrive and try to break up the two teams. During the brawl, Dom is punched in the face but stays on his feet and punches back.

Bex visits Dom at work and tells him to not make any plans for the weekend. Dom sees Tel who criticises his tracksuit, but Dom tells him that he is part of the West Ham firm now. Dom later meets Jay, and the two go to the sports shop and steal a load of gear. Some of the firm go to Bex's house to talk about the possible national firm. Bex asks Dom if he would like to go to Europe, and Dom agrees. Bex says he has to get blooded first, which means he has to get the firm's symbol engraved on his forearm. Bex pulls out a Stanley knife and starts to engrave on Dom's arm. When the rest of the firm lick their hands and rub off the symbol that is on their own arms, he realises that it is a joke.

Dom goes to the Lord Nelson to meet up with the boys. Soon after arriving, he is harshly ridiculed in front of everyone by a drunken Trigger for wearing the same tracksuit as Bex. Feeling forlorn, Dom leaves the pub and doesn't go to the game. Bex then visits him at work the next day and tells him to stand up for himself, and invites him to a night club. Dom also gets invited to Crystal Palace on the weekend, but the firm end up going to Millwall to launch a surprise attack on the Millwall firm instead.

Millwall fights back with weapons and largely outnumbers them. As a result, the surprise attack fails and they suffer a humiliating defeat. Bex, along with Dom and some other members of the West Ham firm, go back later and ambush a Millwall fan as he leaves the pub, beating him half to death with lead pipes. They return home only to find that their cars have been smashed up. A calling card has been placed on Bex's car saying "Congratulations, you have just met the Yeti" (the Yeti is a nickname for the Millwall firm leader).

Some of the firm express that they are not happy with Bex's reckless leadership in refusing to back down over the feud with the Yeti, and are ultimately forced by Bex to leave the firm. When Bex brings a bag full of blunt weapons to the Lord Nelson in preparation for a revenge attack on the Yeti and his firm, Dom expresses his concerns as well. Bex reacts angrily, bullying and threatening Dom and telling him that he has no choice but to stay with the firm. They go from the Lord Nelson to London Bridge station and ambush the rival firm. Dom looks on as Bex overpowers the Yeti and kicks him savagely in the head and body repeatedly as he lies on the floor. As Bex walks away, the Yeti pulls a flick knife out of his sock and stabs Bex in the stomach. Off-screen, Bex eventually succumbs to the wound.

That night, the police are seen arriving at Bex's house. His wife answers the door angrily with the baby in her arms. From the police's silence, she knows Bex has been killed and tearfully goes into denial.

In the epilogue, Dom puts on the red tracksuit that Bex told him to never wear again, and heads to the Lord Nelson one last time. He looks through the window and sees that the firm are enjoying themselves and do not appear to be mourning Bex, with Trigger now seemingly in charge. Dom sees this as his chance to get out for good. He walks away from the pub and bumps into Tel. They both walk off exchanging jokes and following their old routine before Dom joined the firm.

== Cast ==
- Paul Anderson as Bex
- Calum MacNab as Dom
- Daniel Mays as Yeti
- Doug Allen as Trigger
- Joe Jackson as Jay
- Richie Campbell as Snowy
- Camille Coduri as Shel
- Eddie Webber as Bob
- Joanne Matthews as Suzy
- Billy Seymour as Terry
- James Kelly as Beef
- Jaf Ibrahim as Usef
- Tommy Nash as Nunk
- Ebony Gilbert as Justine

== Adaptation ==
Loosely adapted from Alan Clarke's 1989 classic TV film for Screen Two, Nick Love's film is set earlier in the 1980s; around 1984. It retells a similar story to the original, but it is told from a different character's point of view. The protagonist of this adaptation is Dom, who was a minor character in the original.

Dom is a young wannabe football casual who gets drawn into the charismatic but dangerous world of the firm's top boy, Bex Bissell. A 'firm' being the name used by groups of smartly dressed hooligans, under the pretence of being supporters of a particular team, who arrange organised violence on match days with rival 'firms'.

== Themes ==
A key part of the film, as in almost all of Nick Love's, is the focus on male bonding, how men bond, male banter, how relationships break apart and how they are rekindled.

Another part of the film focusses on the hip-hop street dance scene prevalent in the United Kingdom and beyond, with The Rock Steady Crew's song 'Hey You...Rock Steady Crew' making an appearance and street dancing appearing in the film.

Furthermore, the film explores drug use as both Dom and his friend Tel both use cannabis.

The film also delves into football hooliganism, heavily focussing on the football casual movement that became so prevalent in the 1980s in the UK. This includes a full and deep exposition of the clothing worn by football causals during the era.

The film also deals with shoplifting, with Dom and a friend from the firm stealing from a sportswear shop.

The film also ventures into casual sex, with Dom fraternising with a local woman called Justine.

The film also explores the role of parenting in a young adult's life and how they support children through good times and tough times.

Another part of the film is its focus on council estate life. Filmed mainly on the Ferrier Estate in Kidbrooke, South London, (now demolished), it shows the life of youngsters on estates and both the good and the bad that takes place there.

The film also explores male peer pressure and how a younger man can be impressed and become spellbound by an older man.

The film also explores boredom and nihilism in young men, with Dom explaining that he is 'sick of doing the same thing every day' and that he wanted to do something different.

The film also explores the dialectical problem of wealthy and successful individuals becoming involved in football violence. Both Bex and Trigger appear wealthy and successful men with respected jobs, yet both end up being involved in the organisation and orchestration of violence.

The film also explores the football culture in the UK, with lads going on trains in order to get to games and the film celebrates that culture.

== Filming Locations ==
Much of the film was filmed on the now demolished Ferrier Estate. The director of the film, Nick Love, lived on the estate as a youth.

The film was also filmed in other parts of London.

== Costume Themes ==
The costumes in the film heavily reflect the 1980s terrace casual culture prevalent at the time the film is set (1984). This includes Sergio Tacchini tracktops and polo shirts, Fila tracktops and polo shirts, Pringle, Gabicci, Adidas, Diadora, United Colours of Benetton and a number of other brands.

== Reception ==
On the review aggregator website Rotten Tomatoes, 67% of 24 critics' reviews are positive. The website's consensus reads: "Nick Love's remake of the 1989 original has enough warmth, humor, and -- of course -- violence to make The Firm worthwhile."

== Police photograph error ==
On 31 October 2009, it was revealed that stills from the movie were released by Scotland Yard in relation to the 2009 Upton Park riots. Police later released the following statement:

"These images appear to have been taken from a motion picture. We wish to apologise unreservedly to those affected. We are going to be actively trying to contact those people to offer our apologies."

— Scotland Yard statement.

== See also ==
- Millwall F.C. and West Ham United F.C. rivalry
