= Jan Uddin =

British actor of Bangladeshi descent (born 1985)

- Born: 22 October 1985 (age 40); Stoke on Trent, Staffordshire, England, UK
- Occupation: Actor
- Height: 6 ft 1 in (185 cm)

Jan Uddin (born 22 October 1985) is a British actor of Bangladeshi descent, now living in Los Angeles. He is best known for his lead roles in independent film Cliffs of Freedom (2019) and British thriller Lies We Tell (2017). Jan is the first person of Bangladeshi origin to star in both the Marvel Cinematic Universe and a Netflix Original.

== Early life ==
Uddin was born in Stoke on Trent, Staffordshire, England. His parents were of Bangladeshi origin.

Jan moved to London when he was 19 years old and then trained to become an actor at the Academy Drama School.

== Career ==
=== Acting ===
In 2007, acting roles included Casualty and short film Famous Last Words.

In 2008, he featured in the BBC soap opera EastEnders as Jalil Iqbal; a love interest for Shabnam Masood (Zahra Ahmadi.) His character first appeared on 17 March 2008 departing on 28 March 2008.

In 2009, Jan Uddin appeared in a film called Boogie Woogie alongside Gillian Anderson, Heather Graham and Amanda Seyfried.

In 2010, Uddin played Sweet Boy in Shank. The film is set in the future, around the survival of young adults during a food shortage.

In 2011, he starred in the French film Black Gold, directed by Jean-Jacques Annaud and starring Freida Pinto, Antonio Banderas and Mark Strong.

In 2017, Jan was cast as KD in Lies We Tell. His character "- brings some of the dark side to the film."

In 2019, Jan played Tariq in the independent drama Cliffs of Freedom directed by Van Ling and shot in New Mexico.

== Filmography ==
=== Television ===
Year	Title	Role	Notes
2007	Casualty	Parvez Gaur	1 episode (as Jan Dean)
2008	EastEnders	Jalil Iqbal	6 episodes
2008	The Bill	Matthew Firouzeh	1 episode
2011	Injustice	Tariq Hal-Hamdani	2 episodes
2014	The Red Tent	Pharaoh	1 episode
2015	Marley's Ghosts	Paramedic	1 episode
2015	Cucumber	Saul	3 episodes
2019	Agents of S.H.I.E.L.D.	Isaiah	3 episodes
2021	Cowboy Bebop	Asimov Solensan	

=== Film ===
Year	Title	Role
2007	Famous Last Words	Main role (as Jan Dean)
2009	Boogie Woogie	Art's Partner
2010	Shank	Sweet Boy
2011	Black Gold	Ibn Idriss
2011	Lost Paradise (short)	Zubeer
2017	Lies We Tell	KD, won Best Supporting Actor at the International Film Festival of Wales
2019	Cliffs of Freedom	Tariq

== See also ==
- List of British actors
- British Bangladeshi
- List of British Bangladeshis
