= Time Now =

- Official poster
- Directed by: Spencer King
- Written by: Spencer King
- Starring: Eleanor Lambert; Claudia Black
- Release dates: October 2021 (Austin); October 26, 2021
- Running time: 90 minutes
- Country: United States
- Language: English

Time Now is a 2021 American thriller drama film written and directed by Spencer King and starring Eleanor Lambert and Claudia Black.

== Cast ==
- Eleanor Lambert as Jenny
- Claudia Black as Joan
- Xxavier Polk as Kash
- Asher Atkisson
- Paige Kendrick as Tanja
- Sebastian Beacon as Gonzo
- Jeannine Thompson as Helen
- Peter Knox as Geoff
- Aaron Matthew Atkisson as Mark
- Dominique Alexander as Pastor
- Ashley Sheri as Breonna
- Dwele

== Production ==
The film was shot in Detroit in April 2019.

== Release ==
The film premiered at the Austin Film Festival in October 2021; then it was released in theaters and on demand on October 26, 2021.

== Reception ==
The film has a 67% rating on Rotten Tomatoes based on nine reviews.

Evan Dossey of the Midwest Film Journal gave the film a positive review and wrote, "It’s certainly well-cast, mostly well-shot and, in its best moments, not what you expect."
