= T. J. Ramini =

British actor

- Occupation: Actor
- Years active: 1996–present
- Television: The Bill

T. J. Ramini is a British actor known for his role as DC Zain Nadir in The Bill and Tarin Faroush in 24.

== Career ==
Ramini's other parts include guest appearances in the television series Casualty, The Inspector Lynley Mysteries, 24 and NCIS, as well as the film Batman Begins (2005). He guest-starred in Boston Legal as a prisoner who is wrongfully detained and tortured at Guantanamo Bay, and in Desperate Housewives as Yaniv (in the episode "Mama Spent Money When She Had None"). In 2017 he starred in Prison Break, and later appeared in an episode of the American political drama Designated Survivor.

== Filmography ==
=== Film ===
Year	Film	Role	Notes
1996	Dating the Enemy	Troy	
2003	The Death of Klinghoffer	Ismael	
2004	Spivs	Pavel	
2005	Batman Begins	Crane Thug # 1	
2013	Get Lucky	Raphael	
2014	Postman Pat: The Movie	Ben Taylor	Voice
2017	The Bachelors	Real Estate Agent	

=== Television ===
Year	Show	Role	Notes
1997	Fallen Angels	Barman	as Tarek Ramini; episode: "Hair"
2001	Waking the Dead	Majid Kahn	as Tarek Ramini; episode: "Special Relationships"
2001–2003	Casualty	PC Russell	as Tarek Ramini; recurring
2003	The Inspector Lynley Mysteries	Muneer Malik	as Tarek Ramini; episode: "Deception On His Mind"
2003	Adventure Inc	Loesan	Episode: "The Man Who Wouldn't Be King"
2003	The Bill	Ravi Bhatia	2 episode
2005	Ultimate Force	Drew Jordan	Episode: "Class of 1980"
2005	Dalziel and Pascoe	Visha Iqbal	2 episodes: Dust Thou Art (Parts 1 & 2)
2005–2007	The Bill	DC Zain Nadir	Main role
2007	Boston Legal	Benyam Kallah	Episode: "Guantanamo By The Bay"
2008	Heroes and Villains	Cuauhtemoc	Episode: "Cortes"
2009	Desperate Housewives	Yaniv	Episode: "Mama Spent Money When She Had None"
2009 & 2010	NCIS	Mossad Officer Malachi Ben-Gidon	3 episodes
2010	24	Tarin Faroush	Recurring; Season 8; 11 episodes
2011	Private Practice	Doug Iverson	Episode: "Don't Stop 'Till You Get Enough"
2012	Arrow	Jason Brodeur	Episode: "An Innocent Man"
2013	Emily Owens M.D.	Costa	Episode: "Emily and... The Car and The Cards"
2013	CSI: Crime Scene Investigation	Grady	Episode: "Dead of the Class"
2013–2014	Twisted	Vikram Desai	Recurring; 7 episodes
2014	Agents of S.H.I.E.L.D.	Carlo Mancini	Episode: "T.R.A.C.K.S."
2016	Castle	Jordanian Prince	Episode: "Death Wish"
2016 & 2018	NCIS: Los Angeles	Tobin Shaked / John Martin	2 episodes
2017	Prison Break	Cross	Recurring; 2 episodes
2017	Designated Survivor	Nuresh Sahin	1 episode: "Family Ties"
2018	The Librarians	Robbie Bender	Episode: "And the Disenchanted Forest"
2021	Legacies	Robin Goodfellow	Episode: "Salvatore: The Musical!"
2022–2023	All Rise	Rory Faez	2 episodes
2025	Krapopolis	Barfus (voice)	Episode: "Don Tyxote"

=== Video games ===
Year	Game	Role
2011	Uncharted 3: Drake's Deception	Salim/Marlowe's agents
2012	Diablo III	Additional voices
2012	Epic Mickey 2: The Power of Two	Additional voices
2012	Sleeping Dogs	Naz Singh
2013	Dota 2	Timbersaw/Bristleback/Skywrath Mage/Abaddon/Underlord
2014	Bayonetta 2	Loptr, Additional Voices
2016	The Walking Dead: Michonne	Siddiq
2017	Star Wars Battlefront II	Del Meeko
2017	Tacoma	Clive Siddiqi
2018	World of Warcraft: Battle for Azeroth	
2019	Anthem	Owen Corley
2023	Star Wars Jedi: Survivor	Daho Sejan
2023	Dead Space	Jacob Temple
