= Michael Knowles (film producer) =

English film producer

Michael Knowles is an English film producer. He is also a part-time film lecturer at Staffordshire University, and the lead singer/guitarist for the English alternative rock band WinterGreen.

== Career ==
=== Movies ===
Knowles’ feature films include a A Boy Called Dad starring Ian Hart, which was selected for the Rome Film Festival in 2009 and purchased by the BBC, Best Laid Plans starring Stephen Graham, Maxine Peake and Adewale Akinnuoye-Agbaje, released through Sony Pictures in 2012, and the mystery horror film The Messenger, with Robert Sheehan, Lily Cole and Joely Richardson, released through Metrodome in 2015.

In 2016 he produced the drama Away, set in the north English seaside town of Blackpool, with Timothy Spall and Juno Temple.

In 2020, Knowles completed Running Naked, a comedy drama directed by Victor Buhler and starring Tamzin Merchant, Matthew McNulty and Andrew Gower. The film was released in 2021.

Knowles is a producer of Book of Love, starring Sam Claflin and Veronica Echugui, which went into production in March 2021.

=== Awards ===
Knowles produced Talking with Angels, which was nominated for a BAFTA for best short film.

== Filmography ==
- Talking with Angels (2004)
- Punch (2004)
- A Boy Called Dad (2009)
- Curtains (2009)
- Waving Trains (2009)
- Butterfly (2009)
- Best Laid Plans (2012)
- The List (2013)
- The Messenger (2015)
- Away (2016)
- Running Naked (2020)
