= Claudia Black =

Australian and American actress (born 1972)

- Black at Dragon Con in 2026
- Born: Claudia Lee Black; 11 October 1972 (age 54); Sydney, Australia
- Citizenship: Australia; US
- Occupation: Actress
- Years active: 1992–present
- Spouse: Jamie Oddie (m. 2004; div. 2016)
- Children: 2
- Website: claudiablackconsulting.com

Claudia Lee Black (born 11 October 1972) is an Australian and American actress. She is best known for her portrayals of Aeryn Sun in Farscape (1999–2003), Vala Mal Doran in Stargate SG-1 (2004–2007), and Sharon "Shazza" Montgomery in the film Pitch Black (2000).

Black has appeared in numerous television series, particularly those in the science fiction genre. Her roles include aunt Dahlia in The Originals (2015), Dr. Sabine Lommers in Containment (2016), and Klothow in Ahsoka (2023). She has also had prominent voice roles in video games, including Admiral Daro'Xen and Matriarch Aethyta in Mass Effect, Chloe Frazer in Uncharted, Morrigan in Dragon Age, Whitney Chang in The Amazing Spider-Man, Tess Everis in Destiny, and Samantha Byrne in the Gears of War series.

== Early life ==
Black was born and raised in Sydney, New South Wales. Her father Jules Black is a gynaecologist, and her mother Judy Black (née Henry) is a professor of pharmacology at the University of Sydney. She has an older sister named Georgina. Black is Jewish, and a descendant of German Jews who escaped the Holocaust. She studied at the Anglican Kambala School in Sydney. She has lived in numerous countries, including Australia, New Zealand, Spain, the United Kingdom, Canada, and the United States.

== Career ==
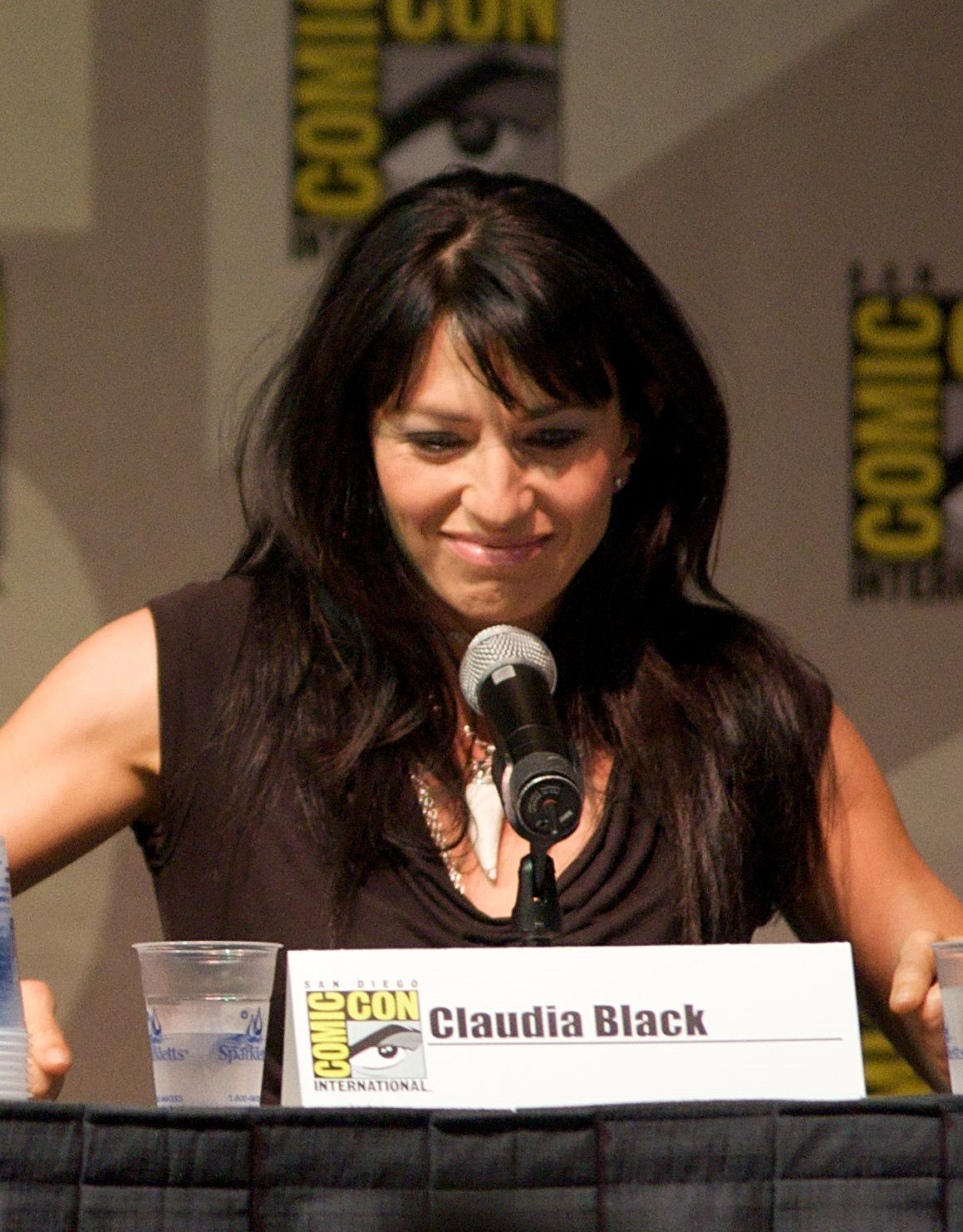
Black at San Diego Comic Con in 2009

=== Film and television ===
Black began her acting career in her native Australia. Her first leading role was as Claire Bonacci in A Country Practice. She had a main role in the New Zealand soap opera City Life, playing the Greek lawyer Angela Kostapas.

In 1999, Black was cast to play Aeryn Sun in the science fiction series Farscape, a co-production between the United States and Australia. She gained international recognition for her role in the series, and was nominated for a Saturn Award in the Best Actress category in 2001, 2002 and 2005, winning in the latter. During this time she also appeared in the feature films Pitch Black and Queen of the Damned.

Despite being planned to run for five seasons, Farscape was cancelled after its fourth season in 2003. Black later reprised her role as Aeryn in the miniseries Farscape: The Peacekeeper Wars in 2004, which concluded the series' plot. In the same year she appeared as Vala Mal Doran in the Stargate SG-1 episode "Prometheus Unbound". Her performance was well received and she was invited to reprise her role in a recurring capacity in the show's ninth season, after series regular Amanda Tapping left the series on maternity leave. Black appeared in eight episodes of the ninth season and returned to the series as a regular cast member for the tenth and final season. She also starred in Stargate: The Ark of Truth and Stargate: Continuum, two direct-to-video films that wrapped up the series' story lines.

In the NBC TV show Life (2007), Black was cast in the supporting role of Jennifer Conover for the initial pilot. Due to her second pregnancy, the part was recast and the role was given to actress Jennifer Siebel when the series was bought by the TV network.

Black has appeared in numerous television series in the United States, including recurring roles in The Originals and The Nevers. In 2016, she played the major role of Dr. Sabine Lommers in the CW miniseries Containment. In 2023, she portrayed the character Klothow in the first season of the Star Wars series Ahsoka. In 2025, she stated that she would not reprise her role in the second season. She starred as Cossutia in the Starz series Spartacus: House of Ashur. Black's film roles include Joan in the thriller film Time Now and Karla Grey in the science fiction film Deus, which she also produced.

==== Theatre ====
Black has also performed in theatre. She played Portia in a tour of The Merchant of Venice. She has had parts in Spotlight on Women, The Picture of Dorian Gray, Loose Ends and Pick Ups for the Belvoir Street Theatre and Little Women and The World Knot for the Bicentennial Opera.

=== Voiceover work ===
Since the early 2000s Black has been a prolific voice actress in video games. She has gained particular attention for her work with BioWare's Dragon Age and Mass Effect series. Her son Odin Thurkettle voiced her character's son in Dragon Age: Inquisition. She also played Chloe Frazer in the Uncharted series. In 2016, she appeared in Call of Duty: Infinite Warfare as Engineer Audrey "Mac" MaCallum. She has narrated several audiobooks, including George R. R. Martin's Dreamsongs. In 2014, she had a voice-over role in Rick and Morty as Ma-Sha in the episode "Raising Gazorpazorp". She lent her voice to the character of Sheryl Goodspeed in the animated series Final Space.

== Personal life ==
Black married her husband, Jamie Oddie, in 2004. They have two sons. Black and Oddie divorced in 2016. Black resides in the United States and became an American citizen in 2020. She lives in Los Angeles.

Black has spoken at length about her experiences with personal trauma, which inspired her to become a trauma coach. Although raised Jewish, she has fallen out of touch with the religion and identifies as a lapsed Jew.

== Filmography ==
=== Film ===
Year	Title	Role	Notes
2000	Pitch Black	Sharon "Shazza" Montgomery	
2002	Queen of the Damned	Pandora	
2007	Stolen Life	Kieru (voice)	
2008	Stargate: The Ark of Truth	Vala Mal Doran	Direct to video
2008	WarGames: The Dead Code	R.I.P.L.E.Y. (voice)	Direct to video
2008	Stargate: Continuum	Vala Mal Doran / Qetesh	Direct to video
2011	Rango	Angelique (voice)	
2012	Justice League: Doom	Cheetah (voice)	Direct to video
2012	Strange Frame	Parker C. Boyd (voice)	
2012	The Alchemist Agenda	Ariel (voice)	
2013	Rain from Stars	Donna	
2021	Time Now	Aunt Joan	
2022	Deus	Karla Grey	
2023	Godspeed	June (voice)	Indie animated sci-fi short film and pilot

=== Television ===
Year	Title	Role	Notes
1992	Home and Away	Sandra	2 episodes
1993	Seven Deadly Sins	Extra	Miniseries
1993	G.P.	Joanna	Episode: "A Thousand Flowers"
1993	Police Rescue	Julia	Episode: "Double Illusion"
1993–1994	A Country Practice	Claire Bonacci	34 episodes
1996–1998	City Life	Angela Kostapas	Main role
1997	Amazon High	Karina	Television film
1997	Water Rats	Beth Williams	Episode: "All at Sea"
1997–1998	Hercules: The Legendary Journeys	Cassandra	2 episodes
1998	Good Guys, Bad Guys	Jill Mayhew	Episode: "Naughty Bits"
1999	A Twist in the Tale	Morgana	Episode: "Obsession in August"
1999–2003	Farscape	Aeryn Sun	Main role
2000	Xena: Warrior Princess	Karina	Episode: "Lifeblood"
2001	BeastMaster	Huna	Episode: "Wild Child"
2002	Steel Angel Kurumi	Steel Angel Mikhail (voice)	English dub
2004	Farscape: The Peacekeeper Wars	Aeryn Sun	Miniseries
2004–2007	Stargate SG-1	Vala Mal Doran	Main role
2007	The Dresden Files	Liz Fontaine	Episode: "The Other Dick"
2008	Moonlight	The Cleaner	Episode: "Sonata"
2010	NCIS	Velvet Road	Episode: "Borderland"
2011	90210	Guru Sona	3 episodes
2012	Haven	Moira	Episodes: "Magic Hour" Part 1 & 2
2014–present	Rick and Morty	Mar-Sha, Ventriloquiver (voices)	2 episodes
2015	The Originals	Dahlia	Recurring role
2016	Containment	Sabine Lommers	Main role
2019–2020	Roswell, New Mexico	Ann Evans	Recurring role
2019–2021	Final Space	Sheryl Goodspeed (voice)	Main role
2021–2022	The Nevers	Stripe	4 episodes
2023	Ahsoka	Klothow	3 episodes
2024	Transformers: EarthSpark	Terratronus (voice)	4 episodes
2025–2026	Spartacus: House of Ashur	Cossutia	Main role

=== Video games ===
Year	Title	Role	Notes
2002	Farscape: The Game	Aeryn Sun	
2003	Lords of EverQuest	Lady Briana	
2005	God of War	Artemis	
2005	Neopets: The Darkest Faerie	Fauna	
2006	Project Sylpheed	Narrator	
2007	Conan	A'Kanna	
2007	Crysis	Helena	
2009	Uncharted 2: Among Thieves	Chloe Frazer	
2009	Dragon Age: Origins	Morrigan	
2010	Mass Effect 2	Admiral Daro'Xen vas Moreh, Matriarch Aethyta, Rachni Envoy	
2010	Final Fantasy XIV	Narrator	
2011	TERA: The Exiled Realm of Arborea	Elf Commander Fraya	
2011	Gears of War 3	Samantha Byrne	
2011	Rage	Mel, Sally	
2011	Uncharted 3: Drake's Deception	Chloe Frazer	
2012	Mass Effect 3	Admiral Daro'Xen vas Moreh, Matriarch Aethyta	
2012	Diablo III	Cydaea, Mistress of Pain	
2012	The Amazing Spider-Man	Whitney Chang	
2014	Diablo III: Reaper of Souls	Cydaea, Mistress of Pain	
2014	Destiny	Tess Everis	
2014	Middle-earth: Shadow of Mordor	Queen Marwen	
2014	Dragon Age: Inquisition	Morrigan	
2016	Uncharted 4: A Thief's End	Chloe Frazer	Multiplayer only
2016	Gears of War 4	Samantha Byrne	
2016	World of Final Fantasy	Leviathan	
2016	Call of Duty: Infinite Warfare	Audrey "Mac" MaCullum	
2017	Uncharted: The Lost Legacy	Chloe Frazer	
2017	Destiny 2	Tess Everis	
2017	Wolfenstein II: The New Colossus	Jessica "Silent Death" Valiant	The Diaries of Agent Silent Death DLC
2018	Killing Floor 2	Mrs Foster	Mrs Foster Content Pack DLC
2020	Destiny 2: Beyond Light	Tess Everis	
2022	Destiny 2: The Witch Queen	Tess Everis	
2023	Forspoken	Tanta Olas	
2024	Dragon Age: The Veilguard	Morrigan	

== Awards ==
- 2018 – Behind the Voice Actors Awards, Best Female Lead Vocal Performance in a Video Game: Uncharted: The Lost Legacy
- 2015 – Behind the Voice Actors Awards, Best Female Vocal Performance in a Video Game in a Supporting Role: Dragon Age: Inquisition
- 2009 – The Constellation Awards, Best Female Performance in a 2008 Science Fiction Film, TV Movie, or Mini-Series: Stargate: Continuum
- 2007 – The Constellation Awards, Best Female Performance in a 2006 Science Fiction Television Episode: Stargate SG-1: "Memento Mori"
- 2004 – Saturn Award, Best Actress, Farscape: The Peacekeeper Wars
