= A Boy Called Dad =

- UK promotional poster
- Directed by: Brian Percival
- Written by: Julie Rutterford
- Produced by: Michael Knowles; Stacey Murray; Mark John
- Starring: Ian Hart; Louise Delamere; Kyle Ward
- Cinematography: David Katznelson
- Edited by: Kristina Hetherington
- Music by: Srdjan Kurpjel; Marios Takoushis
- Production company: Made Up North Productions
- Release dates: 18 June 2009 (EIFF); 30 April 2010 (United Kingdom)
- Running time: 80 minutes
- Country: United Kingdom
- Language: English
- Budget: £1 million

A Boy Called Dad is a 2009 British drama film, produced by Made Up North Productions. It is the feature film debut of director Brian Percival, screenwriter Julie Rutterford, producers Michael Knowles and Stacey Murray, and co-producer Mark John. It stars Ian Hart and Kyle Ward as father and son.

== Plot ==
A Boy Called Dad tells the story of Robbie, a fourteen-year-old boy who has just become a father. Robbie wishes to take responsibility for his baby son, Elliot, but the mother wants nothing more to do with him. A near-accident reunites Robbie with his estranged father, Joe, and for a while their relationship flourishes. But Joe proves a feckless, unreliable man, and Robbie realizes he does not want to be the same kind of father to his own child. After seeing the baby with his mother and her abusive new boyfriend, Robbie decides to take action. Confrontation leads to violence, and Robbie kidnaps his son and goes on the run. Travelling cross-country, he meets Nia, a traumatized young woman who has some ugly family issues to resolve. Meanwhile, an increasingly guilt-ridden Joe searches for Robbie, trying to guess where he might go next. His search leads to a final confrontation between Joe and Robbie, in which each is forced to face up to the past. The police soon arrive and Robbie gives Joe his son. In the end, Robbie says "They reckon that when you're drowning, you see your life flash before ya. But I didn't, I saw someone else's life, it was my son's, Elliot."

== Cast ==
- Kyle Ward as Robbie
- Ian Hart as Joe
- Charlene McKenna as Nia
- Sacha Parkinson as Leanne
- Louise Delamere as Lynda
- Steve Evets as Mr. Whippy
- Crissy Rock as Chip Shop Woman

== Festival screenings ==
A Boy Called Dad received its world premiere at the Edinburgh Film Festival in 2009, where it was nominated for the Michael Powell award and Kyle Ward received a Trailblazer award. The film was also voted an audience favorite at the festival. The film has since gone on to screen in at the 4th International Rome Film Festival, the CineMagic in Belfast, and to a home crowd at the Salford Film Festival.

A Boy Called Dad was released on DVD on 14 August 2010.
