= Rebecca Ferdinando =

English actress and model (born 1985)

- Rebecca Ferdinando at the film Outside Bet premiere April 2012
- Born: 25 January 1985 (age 41); Enfield, London, England
- Occupations: Actress; model
- Years active: 2005–present

Rebecca Ferdinando (born 25 January 1985) is an English actress and model, best known for playing Mary in the British crime film Bonded by Blood (2010).

== Career ==
Ferdinando attended the Sylvia Young Theatre School from a young age before studying drama at Middlesex University where she gained a BA Honours degree.

Rebecca began her acting career as a child when she appeared in roles for television such as Holby City, The Last Detective and Silent Witness.

When she was eighteen she was signed by some of London's top modelling and commercial agents which led her to work for some famous brands and campaigns such as Vivienne Westwood. This work funded her through drama school and then presenting on Channel Five's The Great Big British Quiz, while modelling for shows like This Morning, The Alan Titchmarsh Show and GMTV.

Since graduating she has played roles including as Dorrabella for BBC's Elgar's Enigma, Beanie in the feature film Shank; directed by Mo Ali, Mary alongside Tamer Hassan in Bonded By Blood and most recently she played Cheryl in Outside Bet which was released on 24 April 2012.

== Television ==
- Holby City
- The Last Detective
- Silent Witness
- The Great British Quiz, presenter
- Elgar's Enigma, Dorrabella
- Russell Howard's Good News, Baywatch babe (Series 6 Episode 1)
- The Johnny and Inel Show, Ugly Sister (Getting Serious 2013): Princess Aurora (Dreams 2013)

== Films ==
Film
Year	Title	Role	Notes
2010	Bonded by Blood	Mary	
2010	Shank	Beanie	
2011	X-Men: First Class	1980s croupier (uncredited)	
2012	Outside Bet	Cheryl	
2012	The Rise and Fall of a White Collar Hooligan	Nicey Pricey	
2013	Get Lucky	Anabelle	
2013	Rush	Maid of honor	
2013	Saving Santa	Valley girl elf	
2014	He Who Dares	Libby	
2014	Art Ache	Cheyenne	
2016	The Rise and Fall of a White Collar Hooligan 3	Nicey Pricey	
2016	Gridiron	Angela	
2017	Bonded by Blood 2	Mary	
(post-production)	The List	Reporter	
2017	The Last Scout	Hayley	
2020	Nemesis	Janet	
