= Calum MacNab =

British actor

- Born: 19 January 1989; United Kingdom
- Occupation: Actor
- Years active: 2004–present

Calum MacNab (born 19 January 1989) is a British actor best known for playing Raff in The Football Factory (2004) and the lead character Dom in The Firm (2009). His career has spanned cinema and television, frequently within gritty British crime and coming-of-age dramas.

== Early life and training ==
MacNab was born in the UK, became interested in acting whilst he studyed performing arts at the Miskin Theatre, Dartford.

== Career ==
MacNab made his screen debut opposite Danny Dyer in a cult hooligan film directed by Nick Love, in The Football Factory (2004). The performance led to further roles in British gangster cinema, including Octane (2007), and Rise of the Footsoldier (2007). MacNab reunited with Nick Love to play the lead role of Dom in a remake of the 1989 film of the same name The Firm (2009).

On television he has appeared in long-running police drama The Bill, portrayed Jason Foley in the ITV film Ahead of the Class (2005), and played the young Roy Slater in the sitcom prequel Rock & Chips (2010).

In 2012, he portrayed Mark “Bax” Baxter an unemployed print worker who forms a syndicate to own a racehorse in Outside Bet (2012). The film also starred Bob Hoskins, Jenny Agutter, Emily Atack, and Linda Robson.

In 2025, after a 13 year hiatus, MacNab returned to the London crime film genre, alongside Danny Dyer and Geoff Bell in Marching Powder (2025).

== Filmography ==
=== Film ===
- The Football Factory (2004) – Raff
- Stoned (2005) – School Boy (uncredited)
- Octane (2007) – Wayne
- Rise of the Footsoldier (2007) – John Kennedy
- The Firm (2009) – Dom
- Man and Boy (short, 2010) – Alfie
- Just for the Record (2010) – Mark Nowlan
- The Decoy Bride (2011) – Journalist 3
- Outside Bet (2012) – Mark “Bax” Baxter
- Comedown (2012) – Gal
- Marching Powder (2025) – Kenny Boy

=== Television ===
- The Bill (2004–2005) – Youth / Jason Berridge (2 episodes)
- Ahead of the Class (2005, TV film) – Jason Foley
- Rock & Chips (2010) – Roy Slater (2 episodes)

== Reception and style ==
Reviewers have noted MacNab’s ability to portray conflicted, working-class protagonists. My Weekender praised his “raw authenticity” and commitment to physical roles when discussing his performance in The Firm.
