= The Decoy Bride =

2011 film by Sheree Folkson

- Theatrical release poster
- Directed by: Sheree Folkson
- Written by: Neil Jaworski; Sally Phillips
- Produced by: Robert Bernstein; Douglas Rae; Paul Ritchie
- Starring: Kelly Macdonald; David Tennant; Alice Eve; Sally Phillips; Michael Urie
- Edited by: Dan Farrell
- Music by: Julian Nott
- Distributed by: CinemaNX
- Release dates: 14 May 2011 (Cannes); 9 March 2012 (United Kingdom)
- Country: United Kingdom
- Language: English
- Budget: £2.5 million
- Box office: $117,754

The Decoy Bride is a 2011 British romantic comedy film written by comedian Sally Phillips and Neil Jaworski, and starring Kelly Macdonald, David Tennant, and Alice Eve and set on the fictional island of Hegg, supposedly located in the Outer Hebrides of Scotland. The film was made by Ecosse Films.

== Plot ==
American movie star Lara Tyler is hounded by the press as she prepares to wed English author James Arber. Despite the efforts of her managers Steve and Emma, the secret wedding is interrupted by paparazzo Marco Ballani, determined to photograph the "wedding of the decade". Lara resolves to find a more remote location for her nuptials.

Katie Nic Aodh returns to her hometown on the tiny Scottish island of Hegg after breaking off her engagement. She moves back into "The Sunrise", the bed and breakfast run by her terminally ill mother Iseabail, taking up her former shop assistant job. Encouraged to write a guide book on Hegg, Katie documents the island’s eccentricities.

Captivated by James's enchanting – albeit fictional – description of Hegg in his latest book, Lara chooses to have their wedding on the island. They stay at the local castle, which Steve transforms to match the book. Katie unsuccessfully flirts with an incognito James, and Marco comes to stay at the Sunrise, disguised as a monk. Suspicious of Marco and recognizing Steve from the tabloids, Iseabail deduces what is happening and calls the press. Spotting Marco staking out the wedding chapel, Lara runs off.

With Lara missing, Steve proceeds with the ceremony, using a "decoy bride" to convince Marco he has succeeded in photographing the wedding, but without informing James. Katie reluctantly accepts the role for £5,000. Heavily veiled, she arrives at the Chapel and exchanges vows with James, but her dreadful American accent alerts him to the lie. The wedding party returns to the castle as the media descend on Hegg. Steve locks Katie and James in the bridal suite, keeping the press focused on the castle until Lara can be found. Katie and James bicker, and realize they may have been officially married.

Disguised as an elderly local, Lara sees Iseabail with a substantial payment for notifying the press. Lara is touched when Marco, unaware of her true identity, reveals that he has fallen in love with her. Infiltrating the castle, he bursts into the suite. He and James tussle, before Marco declares his love for Lara and leaves to find her. James follows suit, but is forced to rescue Katie when she falls into the moat.

They go to the Sunrise, bonding as they change out of their wet clothes. Marco intercepts Lara’s voicemail for James to meet her at a nearby cove. Recognized by Marco's editor, Lara kicks him in the face, before forcing Iseabail to toss her money off the cliffs. Finding Katie with James – wearing Katie's absentee father's vintage bagpiper's costume – Iseabail reveals that she summoned the press to the wedding. Believing Katie has orchestrated everything for money, James leaves to meet Lara.

An elderly deaf couple mistake James for Katie's father, and he attempts to play the bagpipes for them as they dance. Realizing she has fallen for him, Katie finds James. He is attacked by Katie's ex-boyfriend Angus, who begs her to take him back, but she declines. She and James consult Reverend McDonough, who declares that if James can reach Lara before nightfall, their wedding can proceed; he dissolves James and Katie's marriage. Katie confesses her feelings for James, but leads the paparazzi away as he meets Lara and the reverend, with Marco watching nearby.

Months later, Katie prepares to leave Hegg; she traveled the world with her mother before she died, with Lara's help, and her guidebook has been published. Departing by boat, she sees James arriving on the island. Having come to find her, he reveals that he has dedicated his latest book to her. They reunite on the docks, and share a kiss. Lara visits Marco, and they are caught by another paparazzo.

== Cast ==
- Kelly Macdonald as Katie Nic Aodh, the decoy bride
- David Tennant as James Arber, a best-selling English writer engaged to Lara
- Alice Eve as Lara Tyler, an American movie star
- Michael Urie as Steve Korbitz, Lara's manager
- Sally Phillips as Emma, Steve's assistant
- Maureen Beattie as Iseabail, Katie's mother
- Federico Castelluccio as Marco Ballani, a photographer obsessed with Lara
- Dylan Moran as Charley, Marco's editor
- Jeannie Fisher as Aileen, a resident of Hegg
- Hamish Clark as Angus, Muireen's husband and Katie's ex-boyfriend
- James Fleet as Laird
- Sally Howitt as Muireen
- Hannah Bourne as Chloe
- Matthew Chalmers as Callum
- Rony Bridges as Roan
- Victoria Grove as Anais Anais
- Alisha Bailey as Surelle
- Alex Childs as TV host
- Tony Roper as Reverend McDonough
- Ben Addis as Journalist 1
- William Owen as Journalist 2
- Calum MacNab as Journalist 3
- Ross Armstrong as 1st Paparazzo
- Samuel Roukin as 2nd Paparazzo
- Patrick Regis as Hollywood Minister
- Danny Bage as Hotel Doorman
- Tona Gray as Elderly Woman
- Gil Kolirin as Security Guard
- Robert Fyfe as Ancient Crofter
- Maryann Turner as Ancient Crofter's Wife
- Achara Kirk as Tourist

== Production ==
David Tennant said that the film was an homage to the 1983 Scotland-set film Local Hero. The fictional island of Hegg was inspired by Jura and Eigg. It received the largest grant possible from Scottish Screen, £300,000.

Rehearsals started in London on 21 June 2010. Filming began on 27 June on the Isle of Man, before moving to Scotland. Filming ended on 31 July 2010. Many of the outdoor scenes were filmed on the Isle of Man while other scenes were filmed in Glasgow and at the Caerlaverock Castle in Dumfries and by Loch Fyne in Argyll.

The score was written by Julian Nott.

CinemaNX distributed the film in the United Kingdom and HanWay Films is the international sales agent.

== Reception ==
The film received mixed to negative reviews from critics. It holds a score of 23% on review aggregator Rotten Tomatoes and a score of 42/100 on Metacritic.

Neil Genzlinger of The New York Times liked the film, praising the performance by Tennant and Macdonald and the mocking of celebrity culture. Frank Scheck of The Hollywood Reporter called the film a "bland romantic comedy in the Richard Curtis style" but praises Macdonald's performance and concludes that her performance makes the film tolerable.

The A.V. Club's Alison Willmore gave the film a "D+", criticizing that the talented cast and pretty scenery cannot save the film from the fact that it is "inescapably based on how romantic it is that someone would throw over his doting, famous fiancée for an ordinary girl" even though the story does not convey any reasons why this should happen. Michael Atkinson of The Village Voice called it a "pernicious tripe suitable only for masochists and the intellectually disabled" and notes that "the supposedly frothy tone is tarry and flavorless, and the drill is painfully familiar".
