= Get Lucky (film) =

- Promotional poster
- Directed by: Sacha Bennett
- Written by: T. J. Ramini; Walter Taylaur
- Produced by: Chris Howard; Frank Mannion; Nick Simunek; Terry Stone
- Starring: Luke Treadaway; T. J. Ramini; Craig Fairbrass; Emily Atack; Terry Stone
- Cinematography: Peter Wignall
- Edited by: Jens Baylis
- Music by: Greg Hatwell
- Production companies: Gateway Films; Atlas Independent
- Distributed by: Universal Pictures
- Release date: 9 August 2013 (United Kingdom)
- Running time: 86 minutes
- Country: United Kingdom
- Language: English
- Box office: $5 million

Get Lucky is a 2013 British action film directed by Sacha Bennett and starring Luke Treadaway, T. J. Ramini, Craig Fairbrass, Emily Atack and Terry Stone. The film is about a man in debt who joins his brother to pull a heist on the casino of a crime lord, but each one in his hired crew seem to have their own motive. It was produced by Gateway Films and Atlas Independent and released by Universal Pictures in the United Kingdom on August 9, 2013.

== Plot ==
Brothers Lucky and Raphael have always lived on the wrong side of the law. When a "job" goes very wrong and Lucky finds himself in debt to local heavies, Sebastian and Kramer, he is forced to join his wayward brother on the biggest heist of their careers. While Raphael concocts a plan to rob the casino of the most powerful crime lord in town, Mr Zigic, and enlists the help of Zigic's own unwitting nephew Niko and employee Eli, Lucky is distracted by the girl of his dreams, femme fatale Bridget, who may not be all that she seems. With betrayals and twists of fate, it seems everyone has an ulterior motive. The question is who can the brothers trust on the most important night of their lives?

== Cast ==
- Luke Treadaway as Lucky
- T. J. Ramini as Raphael
- Craig Fairbrass as Sebastian
- Emily Atack as Bridget
- Terry Stone as Kramer
- Marek Oravec as Niko
- Jason Maza as Eli
- Richie Campbell as Brown George
- Ali Cook as Kirby
- Rebecca Ferdinando as Anabelle
- James Cosmo as Mr. Zigic

== Production ==
Production of the film had been announced in March 2012, when Charles Rovan's production company Atlas Entertainment launched its independent film production & financing label entitled Atlas Independent to focus on producing independent films with Get Lucky servinfg as one of the new production label's productions.

In late=January 2013, Metronome Distribution and American film studio Universal Pictures via its home entertainment division Universal Pictures Home Entertainment had jointly acquired UK distribution & home entertainment rights to the film from Atlas Independent, Metronome Distribution had been served as theatrical distribution for the film's theatrical release and would release in spring of that year whilst Universal Pictures Home Entertainment would serve as home entertainment distributor for the film's home video release.

== Reception ==
Get Lucky was panned by critics.
