= Cliffs of Freedom =

2019 romance film directed by Van Ling

- Theatrical release poster
- Directed by: Van Ling
- Written by: Van Ling; Marianne Metropoulos; Kevin Bernhardt
- Based on: Daughter of Destiny by Marianne Metropoulos
- Produced by: Casey Cannon; Marianne Metropoulos
- Starring: Tania Raymonde; Jan Uddin; Raza Jaffrey; Patti LuPone; Christopher Plummer
- Cinematography: Cory Geryak
- Edited by: Greg Daniels; Richard Lord
- Music by: George Kallis
- Production companies: RanchWorks Picture Show; Aegean Entertainment
- Distributed by: Round Hill Media
- Release dates: February 21, 2019 (London); March 1, 2019 (New York)
- Running time: 137 minutes
- Country: United States
- Languages: Greek; English
- Box office: $300,842

Cliffs of Freedom is a 2019 independent historical drama romance film based on Marianne Metropoulos's novel Daughter of Destiny. Produced by Casey Cannon and Metropoulos, the film is the directorial debut film by Van Ling from a screenplay by Ling, Metropoulos, and Kevin Bernhardt. It stars Tania Raymonde, Jan Uddin, Raza Jaffrey, Patti LuPone, and Christopher Plummer.

The film was released in the United States on March 1, 2019, by Round Hill Media.

== Plot ==
The film is a story of an ill-fated romance between a young and beautiful Greek village girl and a conflicted Turkish officer during the dawn of the Greek War of Independence against the Ottoman Empire in 1821. Twenty-year-old Anna Christina (Tania Raymonde) is smitten by Colonel Tariq (Jan Uddin), a rising star in the Turkish army who has growing doubts about his countrymen's brutal methods of governance, and who had once spared her life on a cliff-top when she was a child. However, their budding romance brings tragedy to her family and her village.

Swearing revenge against the Turks, Christina joins the Greek rebellion and inadvertently becomes a local symbol of the Greek resistance movement, inspiring her countrymen and attracting the ire of the Turks, who place a bounty on her head. Having believed that she could leave her feelings behind, Christina must face off against the man who still loves her and wants to keep her safe, but who has now been tasked with her capture. Their encounters and skirmishes inevitably lead to a tragic confrontation during a pivotal battle between the Greeks and Turks that will change the course of history.

== Cast ==
- Tania Raymonde as Anna Christina
  - Josey Smith as Young Anna Christina
- Jan Uddin as Tariq
- Raza Jaffrey as Sunal Demir
- Patti LuPone as Yia-Yia
- Christopher Plummer as Thanasi
- Billy Zane as Christo
- Lance Henriksen as Old Demetri
  - Jamie Christian Ward as Young Demetri
- Dino Kelly as Vangeli
- Costas Mandylor as Constantine Vakrinos
- Kevin Corrigan as Stavros Valvianos
- Raquel Cassidy as Christina Vakrinos
- Carlo Rota as Mustapha Bey
- Ruth Gemmell as Varvara Vakrinos
- John Thomas Salazar as Nico Vakrinos
- Mike A. Salazar as Alexi Vakrinos
- Ivan Kaye as Ghazi Kalif
- Simon Kassianides as Gregory
- Dennis Boutsikaris as Theodoros Kolokotronis
- Khalah Mitchell as Harem Dancer

== Production ==
=== Filming ===
Principal photography began on October 12, 2016, in Albuquerque, New Mexico, with Cory Geryak serving as cinematographer. Filming wrapped on January 10, 2017. In June 2017, George Kallis was revealed to be scoring the film.

== Release ==
=== Box office ===
The film was released in the United States on March 1, 2019, by Round Hill Media, grossing $16,350 on its opening weekend. As of April 20, 2019, Cliffs of Freedom has grossed an estimated $72,476 in North America and $228,336 in other territories, for a worldwide total of $300,842.

=== Critical response ===
Michael Ordoña of the Los Angeles Times gave a mixed review by stating "Cliffs of Freedom is a bit rocky, but takes its leap in earnest. The game production does its best with limited resources, thanks, in part, to an impressive supporting cast. Apart from Christopher Plummer, it boasts the likes of Patti Lupone, Kevin Corrigan, and Billy Zane in the — shall we say — Billy Zane role: the smarmy, traitorous Greek collaborator with an eye for Anna Christina; one half-expects him to declare, 'I make my own luck!'. The dialogue is often stiff, the action and plotting unlikely, making the romance hard to swallow. The appealing Jan Uddin and Tania Raymonde do generate enough chemistry in their fleeting time together to keep the proposition afloat. However, the climactic moment, though heavily telegraphed, will leave many scratching their heads."
