= Away (2016 film) =

- Official release poster
- Directed by: David Blair
- Written by: Roger Hadfield
- Produced by: Richard Turner; Michael Knowles; Terry Stone
- Starring: Timothy Spall; Juno Temple; Matt Ryan; Hayley Squires; Joanna Roth; Susan Lynch; Terry Stone; Tony Pitts
- Cinematography: Felix Wiedemann
- Edited by: Kate Baird
- Music by: Anne Dudley
- Production companies: Gateway Films; Ratio Film
- Distributed by: 101 Films
- Release dates: 22 June 2016 (Edinburgh); 8 May 2017 (United Kingdom)
- Running time: 105 minutes
- Country: United Kingdom
- Language: English

Away is a 2016 British drama film directed by David Blair and starring Timothy Spall and Juno Temple.

The film premiered at the 2016 Edinburgh International Film Festival. It was released in the United Kingdom digitally on 8 May 2017 by 101 Films and on DVD on 15 May 2017 by Metrodome.

== Premise ==
In Blackpool, an unlikely friendship blossoms between a lonely, suicidal widower and a young woman trying to escape an abusive ex-boyfriend.

== Cast ==
- Timothy Spall as Joseph
- Juno Temple as Ria
- Matt Ryan as Dex
- Susan Lynch as Angie
- Hayley Squires as Kaz
- Tony Pitts as Col
- Terry Stone as landlord

== Reception ==
Stephen Carty of Radio Times awarded the film two stars out of five.

=== Critical response ===
On review aggregator Rotten Tomatoes, the film has an approval rating of 60% based on 5 reviews, with an average rating of 5.5/10.
