= Best Laid Plans (2012 film) =

- Directed by: David Blair
- Screenplay by: Chris Green
- Based on: Of Mice and Men by John Steinbeck
- Produced by: Michael Knowles; Brad Moore; Stacey Murray
- Starring: Stephen Graham; Adewale Akinnuoye-Agbaje; Maxine Peake; David O'Hara
- Cinematography: Ali Asad
- Edited by: Pia Di Ciaula
- Music by: Rob Lane
- Production companies: MoliFilms; Made Up North Productions; AV Pictures
- Distributed by: Sony Pictures
- Release date: 3 February 2012
- Running time: 108 minutes
- Country: United Kingdom
- Language: English

Best Laid Plans is a 2012 British drama film directed by David Blair and produced by Michael Knowles for Made Up North Productions Limited. The film was released to select cinemas on 3 February 2012 and is loosely based on John Steinbeck's 1937 book, Of Mice and Men.

== Plot ==
Danny (Graham) is a hustler who is about to be punished by a criminal gang-leader when he is rescued by Joseph (Akinnuoye-Agbaje), a huge man with learning difficulties.

Danny and Joseph are friends, but Danny falls deeper into drugs, debt, and failed money-making schemes. Eventually he persuades Joseph to begin fighting for prize money, in an effort to dissuade his criminal-world accomplices and bosses from exacting their revenge for his unpaid debts.

Danny falls for a prostitute he has started to see and Joseph starts to see a mentally challenged woman who he saves from a group of teenage bullies and starts to drag himself away from the money-making fights that Danny needs him to participate in. Danny begins to question his own motives as he sees the physical damage being done to Joseph.

Danny plans to escape to Ireland with Joseph, aided by his girlfriend Lisa. Unfortunately, Danny is captured and tortured to reveal Joseph's whereabouts.

Ultimately Joseph and Lisa find the location Danny is being held at and after a showdown between Joseph and one of the boss's prize fighters and then the boss, the trio escape in a camper van, pick up Joseph's girlfriend (Maxine Peake) and cross via ferry to Ireland as planned.

The final scene shows Danny seeing Joseph genuinely happy outside playing in the snow being brought cups of tea by Lisa, through the window of the camper van where he is laid up from his injuries, then smiles, starts to bleed heavily from his mouth due to the internal injuries sustained under torture and passes away seemingly at peace.

== Cast ==
- Stephen Graham as Danny
- Adewale Akinnuoye-Agbaje as Joseph
- Maxine Peake as Isabel
- David O'Hara as Curtis

== Reception ==
Best Laid Plans received mixed reviews. On Rotten Tomatoes, the film has a score of 50% based on reviews from 6 critics.
