= Deus (film) =

2022 British film by Steve Stone

- Theatrical release poster
- Directed by: Steve Stone
- Screenplay by: Steve Stone
- Produced by: Claudia Black
- Starring: Claudia Black; David O'Hara; Phil Davis; Lisa Eichhorn
- Cinematography: Kyle Heslop
- Edited by: Jeremy Gibbs
- Music by: John Koutselinis
- Production company: Goldfinch Studios
- Distributed by: Darkland Distribution
- Release date: 22 May 2022
- Running time: 91 minutes
- Country: United Kingdom
- Language: English
- Box office: $12,200

Deus (also known as Deus: The Dark Sphere) is a 2022 British science fiction film written and directed by Steve Stone. The film stars Claudia Black, David O'Hara, Phil Davis, and Richard Blackwood. The film follows a crew of six people aboard a spaceship as they investigate a mysterious black sphere discovered in the orbit of Mars.

== Plot ==
The Earth is on the verge of an environmental disaster. The population has grown to over 20 billion people, and large parts of the planet have become uninhabitable. One day a huge, mysterious and black sphere is discovered in the orbit of Mars. The Achilles spacecraft is sent to investigate. As the six-person crew wakes up from an eight-month cryogenic sleep and approaches the planet, their spacecraft is damaged by a strange beam of light emanating from the sphere.

The sphere begins to transmit the word “Deus”, meaning "God", in every language of the earth. The mentally unstable crew member Si Rubin suffers a nervous breakdown. As a result, Si Rubin kills another crew member and is eventually killed by Commander Sen Paul. The crew lands on the sphere, where scientist Karla Grey has a vision of her daughter, who was fatally injured before departure. One voice prompts the crew members to walk through a gate full of light; in the process, another member of the crew dies.

The Commander then decides to leave the sphere and return to Earth. Grey does not agree with this, as she wants to continue exploring the sphere, and shoots the commander in an altercation. Vance, the head of the mission, appears as a hologram and explains to Grey that everything has been staged. The sphere was designed by scientists on Earth and is intended to encourage people to walk through similar gates on earth; the people will be led to believe they are going to Heaven, but in reality will be simply killed. Vance explains that this an attempt to reduce the population of the earth; he intends to kill 15 billion people, leaving six billion alive.

The two remaining crew member, Grey and Ulph, decide to prevent the mass genocide by blowing up the sphere. Vance then initiates the self-destruction of the spacecraft from Earth. Grey and Ulph barely save themselves in the command module and manage to separate it from the spacecraft. Since the explosive device cannot be remotely detonated, Ulph stays on the sphere and blows it up. Grey sets out with the command module and begins the long journey back to Earth, estimated to take seven years, so that she can inform the human race about the truth of the sphere.

== Cast ==
- Claudia Black as Karla Grey
- David O'Hara as Ulph
- Phil Davis as Vance
- Richard Blackwood as Sen Paul
- Lisa Eichhorn as Mother
- Charlie MacGechan as Sean Walsh
- Sophia Pettit as Jess
- Branko Tomović as Si Rubin
- Crystal Yu as Tez Turreau

== Production ==
Deus was filmed at Highfield Grange Studios in Yorkshire, England. Lead actress Claudia Black produced the film and helped to revise the script.

== Reception ==
The film had its world premiere at the 2022 Sci-Fi London Film Festival. It grossed $12,200 in theaters. It was nominated for Best Score at the Emden International Film Festival. The film was later released on DVD and digital.

=== Critical response ===
The film received mixed reviews from critics. Film critic Roger Moore gave it one and a half out of five stars, saying "But the cast seems to have bee [sic] directed into narcolepsy. There’s nothing here that they’d care to wake up and get us involved with.". Steve Kirkham of The Dark Side magazine gave it three stars, calling it "Reasonably well put together by writer/director Steve Stone" but adding that it is "dull and unexciting" and derivative of other films such as Alien and 2001: A Space Odyssey.
