= Outside Bet =

2012 British comedy film

- Directed by: Sacha Bennett
- Written by: Mark Baxter and Paolo Hewitt (novel The Mumper); Nigel Smith; Sacha Bennett
- Produced by: Carolyn Bennett; Tony Humphreys; Terry Stone
- Starring: Bob Hoskins; Jenny Agutter; Philip Davis; Adam Deacon
- Cinematography: Nic Lawson
- Edited by: Kate Evans
- Distributed by: Universal Pictures
- Release date: 27 April 2012
- Running time: 94 mins.
- Country: United Kingdom
- Language: English
- Budget: $7,500,000

Outside Bet, also known as Weighed In: The Story of the Mumper, is a British comedy film directed by Sacha Bennett and starring Bob Hoskins, Jenny Agutter, Philip Davis and Adam Deacon. The film was released on 20 April 2012.

== Plot ==
It is 1985. Thatcher is in power, Sade is on the radio, and the print workers have gone on strike. But nothing, not even a scale eight earthquake can put a dampener on a group of close friends that meet every Sunday in their regular South London pub for a pint and free flowing banter of the highest order. Set against the backdrop of a changing way of life-as Rupert Murdoch moves the printing of his newspapers from Fleet Street to Wapping-this is a tale of seven firm friends, who embark on a unique journey that eventually leads them to gamble all of their savings and redundancy money on a single race.

== Cast ==
- Bob Hoskins - Percy 'Smudge' Smith
- Calum MacNab - Mark 'Bax' Baxter
- Jenny Agutter - Shirley Baxter
- Philip Davis - Threads
- Adam Deacon - Sam The Soleman
- Vincent Regan - Jago
- Mark Cooper Harris - Harry
- Emily Atack - Katie
- Montserrat Lombard - Becka
- Terry Stone - Johnny Gossamer
- Perry Benson - Sefton Wallace
- Dudley Sutton - Alfie Hobnails
- Linda Robson- Lil
- Rita Tushingham - Martha
- Ali Cook - Stevie
- Lucy Drive - Erica
- Rebecca Ferdinando - Cheryl

== Reception ==
The film was not well received by critics. The review aggregator website Rotten Tomatoes records 9 reviews with an average rating of 3.4/10. Other reviews have been more positive - Mark Kermode declared it his Film of the Week, saying he was "charmed" by the film, and also made it one of his 6 "Gems" of the year.
