= Shank (2010 film) =

- Official film poster
- Directed by: Mo Ali
- Written by: Paul Van Carter
- Produced by: Nick Taussig; Daniel Toland; Paul Van Carter; Terry Stone
- Starring: Adam Deacon; Kaya Scodelario; Bashy; Kedar Williams-Stirling; Michael Socha; Jerome Holder; Jennie Jacques; Jan Uddin
- Cinematography: Adam Frisch
- Edited by: Julian Tranquille
- Music by: Chad Hobson
- Production companies: Gunslinger; Gateway Films; Cinematic Productions
- Distributed by: Revolver Entertainment
- Release date: 26 March 2010
- Running time: 90 minutes
- Country: United Kingdom
- Language: English

Shank is a 2010 British action film directed by first-time filmmaker Mo Ali. Written by Paul Van Carter, it was shot in London in 2009. The movie stars Adam Deacon, Bashy, Jennie Jacques, Kaya Scodelario, Kedar Williams-Stirling and Rory Beresford in the lead roles. It was released on 26 March 2010.

== Plot ==
In a dystopic future London in 2015, society has fallen apart, gangs have taken over, and the economy is in complete anarchy. Junior and his older brother, Rager, are in charge of a local gang, "The Paper Chaserz". They try to stay out of trouble and refuse to kill as part of their "moral code", which is especially enforced by the strong but defensive Rager.

Rager leads his gang, "The Paper Chaserz" and they plan to steal goods out of a local van. The robbery is successful, but a rival gang called The Soldiers, who are notorious and bloodthirsty in trying to take-over all other postcodes in the London area, attempt a theft. The "Paper Chaserz" escape, except for Junior who is stranded and cornered by The Soldiers. Rager reappears and saves his brother by beating all the rival gang members, telling Junior to leave.

As Junior flees, Rager is attacked by the crews leader Tugz, who stabs Rager in the back multiple times. Junior now teams up with the rest of his gang to get revenge on The Soldiers. The gang meets a trio of girls named Ree Ree, Tash, and Little Lexy, who agree to help them as they also have a reason to get revenge against Tugz.

== Cast ==
- Kedar Williams-Stirling as Junior
- Adam Deacon as "Kicks"
- Michael Socha as "Craze"
- Colin Salmon as "Boogie"
- Ashley 'Bashy' Thomas as Rager
- Jan Uddin as "Sweet Boy"
- Kaya Scodelario as Tasha "Tash"
- Jennie Jacques as "Ree-Ree"
- Rheanne Murray as Lexy
- Jerome Holder as "Tugz"
- Dean Bernard as Gang Member
- Aml Ameen as Bus Conductor
- Lil' Joe as Joe "Lil' Joe", From Wall Heath
- Robert Fucilla as "Breezer"
- Terry Stone as Papa
- Tempa T as himself
- D Double E as himself
- Rebecca Ferdinando as "Beanie"
- Robbie Gee as Beano

== Production ==
Shank is set in a decaying future London in 2015, where territory is controlled by roving gangs, who battle over control of food. While filming at the Heygate Estate in Walworth, South London during September 2009, neighbours complained about the film's violent depiction of gangs and turf wars. In February 2010, Quiet Earth wrote that they had been following the project "for some time" and noted that "The look of the film and the performances all seem solid, which is a good sign for Revolver, considering this is their first feature production."

== Reception ==
In the United Kingdom, the film has received negative reviews. The Guardian gave the film two stars out of five stating that "after an explosive opening, it soon slips into the familiar formula of Kidulthood et al: 24 hours of mephedrone-paced escalating violence." Film4 gave the film two stars out of five, stating that it "soon becomes a little awkward, however, with its ambition tempered by uneven execution and a lazy grasp."

Empire gave the film two stars out of five, describing the film as "all style over substance, the dialogue’s risible and the film looks like it was informed by a generation raised on Grand Theft Auto for any sort of cinematic aesthetic. If this is the future of film then we’re all doomed." The Birmingham Post wrote that "the risible script is incoherent, the dialogue frequently unintelligible and the story is nothing new", giving the film one star. Shank has a 9% rating on Rotten Tomatoes, based on 11 reviews.
