= My Family series 4 =

My Family
- Series 4
- My Family Series 4 DVD Cover
- No. of episodes: 13 + Christmas Special

Release
- Original network: BBC One
- Original release: 21 March – 25 December 2003

Series chronology
- ← Previous; 3 Next → 5

The fourth series of the BBC family sitcom My Family originally aired between 21 March 2003 and 25 December 2003. The series was commissioned following consistently high ratings from the third series. The opening episode of the series, "Fitting Punishment", re-introduces five of the main characters, with the exception of Janey, played by Daniela Denby-Ashe. The episode also introduces a further main character into the fold – Roger Bailey, played by Keiron Self. All fourteen episodes in the fourth series are thirty minutes in length, including the Christmas special. The series was once again produced by Rude Boy Productions, a company that produces comedies created by Fred Barron. The series was filmed at Pinewood Studios in London, in front of a live audience.

== Episode Information ==
No. overall	No. in series	Title	Directed by	Written by	Original release date	UK viewers (millions)
Series
36	1	"Fitting Punishment"	Dewi Humphreys	James Hendrie and Ian Brown	21 March 2003	8.77
Following the death of Mr Beamish, who owned the surgery above Ben's, Roger Bailey Jnr, the son of Ben's former mentor, tries to buy it, but Ben lies and tells him someone else has bought it, so Roger buys the surgery below instead. Meanwhile, Susan tries to make the house baby-friendly for Janey's yet-to-be-born baby, and then has problems with the plumbers. Nick becomes a film extra, Michael becomes obsessed with the Army cadets and Roger falls for Abi as soon as he sees her. First Regular Episode: Roger Bailey JR
37	2	"They Shoot Harpers, Don’t They?"	Dewi Humphreys	James Hendrie and Ian Brown	28 March 2003	9.76
Susan tricks Ben into joining a modern Latin dance class, but Ben turns out the better dancer. They both then get Roger, who allegedly dances "like Fred Astaire", to teach them privately so they can enter a competition at the end of the month. Meanwhile, after getting a "B" in a maths test, Michael decides to stop thinking about girls so he can focus on his studies. Guest starring Jacey Sallés and Georgie Glen. Absent: Nick Harper
38	3	"The Great Escape"	Dewi Humphreys	Steve Armogida and Jim Armogida	4 April 2003	10.17
When Susan's mother Grace (Rosemary Leach) invites herself round for dinner, Ben invents an excuse and goes to Nick's apartment for the evening. When he returns, he does not realise Grace is in his bed and nearly makes love to her thinking that she is Susan. The following day, they all end up at Nick's to avoid Grace. Also, Susan finds a condom in Michael's wallet.
39	4	"Return of the Prodigal Prat"	Dewi Humphreys	Steve Armogida and Jim Armogida	11 April 2003	9.56
After Ben is listed in the obituaries of The Herald, he takes it as the perfect excuse to do nothing, while neighbour Mr Gleason (Paul Hunter) sets his sights on "widowed" Susan and Michael has to write a eulogy. Meanwhile, Susan wants to make Nick's old bedroom into a nursery for Janey's yet-to-be-born baby, but Nick has plans to move back in.
40	5	"Owed to Susan"	Dewi Humphreys	Steve Armogida and Jim Armogida	18 April 2003	8.57
Thanks to Roger, Susan finds out that a poem that Ben wrote her while they were courting was actually Your Face by Jalal ad-Din Rumi. Susan then refuses to make love to him until he's written another one, and he even goes to Abi's poetry class to try to write another one. Meanwhile, Nick takes part in an experiment that makes him lose his memory. Guest starring Frances Barber.
41	6	"Deliverance"	Dewi Humphreys	Andrea Solomons	25 April 2003	7.32
After Janey goes into labour while on the phone to Susan, she and Ben rush up to Manchester to be at her side. On the journey up there they recall Nick's birth, and when they get to St. Margaret's Hospital in Manchester, an unseen Janey has given birth to a baby boy, who is later named Kenzo. First Episode: Kenzo Harper Absent: Michael Harper, Abi Harper, Roger Bailey JR
42	7	"Blind Justice"	Dewi Humphreys	Andrea Solomons	2 May 2003	8.31
Susan gets hysterical blindness after seeing Michael in bed with a girl called Fiona (Rachel Hyde-Harvey), and it will not go until Michael says nothing happened. Meanwhile, Ben is on jury duty and is hassled by a busybody fellow juror called Joanna Elton-Johns (Sylvestra Le Touzel), and Nick becomes a "wrapping artist" and wraps everything up in brown paper. Absent: Roger Bailey JR, Kenzo Harper
43	8	"Friday the 31st"	Dewi Humphreys	James Hendrie and Ian Brown	9 May 2003	8.47
It's Halloween and Susan has turned the family home into a "house of horror" and dressed up as a witch, but Ben is much less enthusiastic. They are plagued by a group of children (Dani Harmer, Tony Bignell and Hannah Bridges) doing trick or treating, and strange things begin to happen. Also, Abi is dressed as a piece of cheese and Roger is a ghost (a white sheet, actually...) Absent: Nick Harper, Michael Harper, Kenzo Harper
44	9	"Sitting Targets"	Dewi Humphreys	James Hendrie and Ian Brown	16 May 2003	9.89
Ben and Susan baby-sit Kenzo for Janey, but Susan becomes annoyed when she discovers that she is the only person who is unable to stop Kenzo from crying. Meanwhile, Michael wants Ben to read his Geography project but when Ben can't be bothered he agrees to do a UFO watch with Michael instead, and Nick is dating three girls at the same time. Absent: Roger Bailey JR
45	10	"Loco Parentis"	Dewi Humphreys	Andrea Solomons	23 May 2003	6.79
Ben and Susan are forced to attend parenting classes by Michael's head teacher (Owen Brenman) after he plays truant from school, and Susan is told that she is too interventionist, so she tries to become laid back like Ben, but Michael actually misses the authority. Meanwhile, Roger tries to become more hard and tough so Abi will go out with him. Absent: Nick Harper, Kenzo Harper
46	11	"Canary Cage"	Dewi Humphreys	James Hendrie and Ian Brown	30 May 2003	6.72
After Susan gets a free holiday for four, she, Ben, Nick and Michael all go to Lanzarote in Spain. However, Ben's luggage gets lost, and then all his credit cards and money are stolen and he is forced to beg to Nick for money. Ben also upsets the people in the next house (Henrieta Baines, Christopher Ryan and Cressida Whyte) by accidentally taking indecent photos with his new digital camera. Meanwhile, Michael spends most of his time out. Absent: Abi Harper, Roger Bailey JR, Kenzo Harper
47	12	"May the Best Man Win"	Dewi Humphreys	Georgia Pritchett	6 June 2003	7.28
Abi's father, Ben's cousin, Richard Harper (Anthony Head) is getting married for a fifth time, to 18-year-old Gina Beresford and he asks Ben to be the best man, which means Ben has to organise the stag night. The wedding makes Abi annoyed, especially as Gina Beresford was at the same school as her. Meanwhile, when Michael refuses to do the washing-up, no one else does it, either. Absent: Kenzo Harper
48	13	"It's a Window Filled Life"	Dewi Humphreys	Fred Barron and Sophie Hetherington	13 June 2003	6.61
Roger goes to the Harpers saying that one of his patients had got an infectious disease from Peru called "Ortiz River Fever", so Susan puts the whole house under quarantine. Michael stays upstairs with Fiona, while Nick tries to get in the house with a pregnant python called Pamela. Meanwhile, Ben manages to escape the house, meets a man called Clarence (Leslie Randall) and then has an epiphany where he does not exist. Guest starring Russ Abbot. Absent: Kenzo Harper
Special
49	S	"Sixty Feet Under"	Jay Sandrich	James Hendrie and Ian Brown	25 December 2003	8.66
Ben, Susan, Nick and Michael are on the tube after doing some Christmas shopping, and due to signalling problems the train cannot move. Michael gets a girlfriend called Claire (Sydney Stevenson), Nick makes money by selling bottled water and Susan starts decorating the carriage. Abi, Roger, and an Albanian man (Samuel Gough) are busking as a Romanian folk band, while Nick brings Richard Whiteley to see Ben and Susan. However, when the problem is fixed, the driver (Nigel Lindsay) refuses to move on until Susan, who was rude to him, apologises. Meanwhile, Ben, dying for a drink, tries to steal the drunk man's booze whilst everyone in the carriage is asleep. Guest appearance by Robert Webb. Absent: Kenzo Harper

== Reception ==
=== Viewers ===
The series was once again given a prime-time Friday evening slot, with most episodes airing at 8:30pm. The first episode of the series gained 8.77 million viewers, a rise of over 1 million viewers from the previous series. The episode was rated the second highest rating for the week. Following heavy promotion, the episode "The Great Escape" managed to break the 10 million barrier, becoming the most watched episode of the series. The fourth series averaged 8.30 million viewers for each episode.

Rank	Episode	Viewership	Audience Percentage
1	The Great Escape	10.17 million	
2	Sitting Targets	9.89 million	
3	They Shoot Harpers, Don't They?	9.76 million	
4	Return of the Prodigal Prat	9.56 million	
5	Fitting Punishment	8.77 million	
6	Sixty Feet Under	8.66 million	
7	Owed To Susan	8.57 million	
8	Friday the 31st	8.47 million	
9	Blind Justice	8.31 million	
10	Deliverance	7.32 million	
11	May the Best Man Win	7.28 million	
12	Loco Parentis	6.79 million	
13	Canary Cage	6.72 million	
14	It's a Window Filled Life	6.61 million	
