= David O'Hara =

Scottish actor (born 1965)

- Born: 9 July 1965 (age 61); Glasgow, Scotland
- Education: Royal Central School of Speech and Drama
- Occupation: Actor
- Years active: 1984–present

David Patrick O'Hara (born 9 July 1965) is a Scottish stage and character actor. A graduate of the Royal Central School of Speech and Drama in London, he is best known to audiences for his numerous supporting roles in high-profile films, including Irishman Stephen in Braveheart, dimwitted mobster Fitzy in The Departed, hitman Mr. X in Wanted, and Albert Runcorn in Harry Potter and the Deathly Hallows – Part 1. He portrayed Det. Danny 'Mac' McGregor on The District and Henry Howard, Earl of Surrey on The Tudors.

== Early life ==
O'Hara was born in Glasgow, Scotland, the son of Martha (née Scott) and Patrick O'Hara, a construction worker. He lived with a large family, and was raised in the Pollok Housing Estate. His family was Catholic and of Irish descent. After leaving school he was accepted for a Youth Opportunities Programme, at a community theatre based at the Glasgow Arts Centre which toured local schools. At age 17, he moved to London to study at the Royal Central School of Speech and Drama, but left after two terms because of a shortage of funds. He went back to Scotland and landed a role in Bill Forsyth's Comfort and Joy, then returned to Central to finish his last term, where he was the understudy to Ralph Fiennes in A Midsummer Night's Dream.

== Career ==
O'Hara appeared in a number of Shakespearean productions, including Romeo and Juliet at the Regent Park Open-Air Theatre and The Comedy of Errors at The Pleasance. He spent a season with the Royal Shakespeare Company and the Barbican Centre, where he starred in Bite of the Night, which was directed by Danny Boyle. He appeared as the "mad" Irishman Stephen in Braveheart, which to date is his most recognized role.

O'Hara had a featured role in the US series The District, which he left after one season to return to the UK. In 2006, O'Hara appeared as Fitzy, one of Jack Nicholson's chief mobsters in the Oscar-winning film The Departed.

In June 2009, O'Hara was filming The Tudors in Dublin. He played Albert Runcorn and Harry Potter disguised as Runcorn in Harry Potter and the Deathly Hallows – Part 1. In April 2017, O'Hara appeared as Alistair Fitz in Marvel's Agents of S.H.I.E.L.D. as Leo Fitz's father.

== Filmography ==
=== Film ===
Year	Title	Role	Notes
1984	Comfort and Joy	Engineer	
1986	Link	Tom	
1989	Resurrected	Male Nurse	
1992	The Bridge	Phillip Wilson Steer	
1995	Braveheart	Stephen	
1995	The Near Room	Harris Hill	
1996	Some Mother's Son	Frank Higgins	
1997	The Devil's Own	Martin MacDuff	
1997	The Slab Boys	Terry Skinnedar	
1997	The Matchmaker	Sean Kelly	
1999	Fever	Will	
1999	The Match	The Mechanic	
1999	Janice Beard 45 WPM	O'Brien	
2001	Made	The Welshman	
2003	Den of Lions	Ferko Kurchina	
2003	Stander	Allan Heyl	
2004	Hotel Rwanda	David	
2006	Tristan and Isolde	Donnchadh	
2006	The Departed	Patrick "Fitzy" Fitzgibbons	
2008	Doomsday	Michael Canaris	
2008	Wanted	Mr. X	
2009	Darfur	Freddie Smith	
2009	Jack Said	The Boss	
2010	The Kid	Terry	
2010	Golf in the Kingdom	Shivas Irons	
2010	Harry Potter and the Deathly Hallows – Part 1	Albert Runcorn	
2011	Cowboys & Aliens	Pat Dolan	
2011	Whole Lotta Sole	Mad Dog Flynn	
2012	Contraband	Jim Church	
2012	Best Laid Plans	Curtis	
2013	The Groundsman	Keith	
2014	Reach Me	Thumper	
2015	The Messenger	DCI Keane	
2016	Dias Santana	Calum Mackie	
2016	The Rising	James Connolly	
2016	Dirt Road to Lafayette	Tom	
2017	In Extremis	Alex	
2019	Cold Pursuit	Sly	
2019	The Professor and the Madman	Church	
2022	DEUS: The Dark Sphere	Ulph	
2022	The Sparrow	Larry	
2024	Horizon: An American Saga – Chapter 1	Bowler Hat Surveyor	

=== Television ===
Year	Title	Role	Notes
1985	One by One	Andy	3 episodes
1990	Taggart	Malcolm Durie	Episode: "Evil Eye Part One"
1991	Chimera	Reynolds	2 episodes
1991	Jute City	Duncan Kerr	3 episodes
1990–1992	Screen Two	Michael / Ronnie Wilson	2 episodes
1993	Full Stretch	Steve Bissell	Episode: "Ivory Tower"
1994	Grushko	Lev	2 episodes
1994	The Tales of Para Handy	Robert Grant	Episode: "The End of the World"
1994	Open Fire	Armed Robber	Television film
1996	Prime Suspect	DS Rankine	2 episodes
1997	Oliver Twist	Bill Sikes	Television film
1999	Jesus	John the Baptist	Television film
2000	Donovan Quick	Clive	Television film
2000–2001	The District	Det. Danny 'Mac' McGregor	Television film
2001	Crossfire Trail	Rock Mullaney	Television film
2004	Pulling Moves	Nuts & Bolts	Episode: "All Day Long"
2005	The Commander	DCC Stephen 'Blackdog' Blackton	Television film
2007	Damage	John Ward	Television film
2008	Trial & Retribution	DI Jack Mullins	Episode: "The Box: Part 1"
2010	The Tudors	Henry Howard, Earl of Surrey	9 episodes
2012	Covert Affairs	Dmitri Larionov	Episode: "Let's Dance"
2013	Luther	DSU George Stark	4 episodes
2015	Gotham	Reggie Payne	2 episodes
2017	Agents of S.H.I.E.L.D.	Alistair Fitz	3 episodes
