= Van Ling =

American visual effects supervisor

Van Ling is a visual effects supervisor, film producer and creator of DVD menus for many popular movies, including the Star Wars DVDs.

== Biography ==
Ling graduated summa cum laude from the USC School of Cinema-Television. He began his career as a visual effects supervisor for The Abyss and became head of production on Lightstorm Entertainment, for which he continued with many major motion pictures and television, including Titanic, Terminator 2: Judgment Day, The Walking Dead, Starship Troopers, Dr. Dolittle, Vanilla Sky and many others. He had a brief cameo in James Cameron's 1997 blockbuster Titanic, as the Chinese man, who was in real-life, a Chinese passenger booked under the name of Fang Lang (original name Wing Sun Fong, 方榮山), whom Fifth Officer Harold Lowe rescued from the sea.

Van is also an active member of the Visual Effect Branch of the Academy of Motion Picture Arts and Sciences, the Producers Guild of America and the Visual Effects Society, the latter in which he served six terms as Board of Directors.

He wrote and directed Cliffs of Freedom, an indie drama film starring Christopher Plummer, Billy Zane, Lance Henriksen, Tania Raymonde, Jan Uddin, Raza Jaffrey, Patti LuPone, Costas Mandylor, and Kevin Corrigan.
