= Terry Stone =

British actor, film producer and author

- Born: 13 January 1971 (age 55); London, England
- Occupations: Actor; film producer; author
- Years active: 2003–present
- Website: terrystoneconnection.com

Terry Stone (born 13 January 1971) is a British actor, film producer and author. Before a career in film, Stone was a rave promoter, and is the founder of One Nation, Garage Nation, and Rave Nation.

== Biography ==
Stone was born in Brixton, London, and grew up in Putney, Kingston, and Camberley. As a child, his admiration for Don King led him to want to pursue a career in boxing. After visiting Sterns Nightclub in Worthing in the early 1990s, he first became involved in 'flyering' (distribution of flyers) for the rave scene before being asked to become involved in a club in Aldershot. From there, he became known as Terry Turbo and founded the jungle and drum and bass One Nation raves, followed by the UK garage Garage Nation events and finally Rave Nation. His 2006 book "King of Clubs" recalls those days.

Stone began his acting career in 2003, appearing in Hell to Pay. He has also appeared in British television series such as EastEnders, The Bill, and My Family. However, he is most notable for his wigs in his role as Tony Tucker, in the 2007 film Rise of the Footsoldier.

Stone currently resides in Windsor with his family.

== Filmography ==
=== Television ===
Year	Title	Role	Notes
2003	My Family	Debt Collector 2	Episode: "May the Best Man Win"; credited as Terry Turbo
2003	Eastenders	Mick	2 episodes; credited as Terry Turbo
2005	The Bill	Lawrence Trent	Episode: "Missing in Action"

=== Film ===
Year	Title	Role	Notes
2004	The Baby Juice Express	Repro Man	
2004	One Man and His Dog	Gary (GBH)	Also executive producer; credited as Terry Turbo
2005	Crush	Tommy	Short film
2006	Rollin' with the Nines	Detective Andy White	Also producer
2007	Rise of the Footsoldier	Tony Tucker	Also executive producer
2008	Ten Dead Men	Hart	
2009	Doghouse	Gavin	Also executive producer
2009	Jack Said	The Fixer	Also co-producer
2009	Unarmed But Dangerous	Ron	
2010	Shank	Papa	Also producer
2010	The Big I Am	Skipper	
2010	Bonded by Blood	Tony Tucker	Also producer
2011	Anuvahood	Terry	Also producer
2011	The Holding	Karsten Rabe	Also producer
2012	Outside Bet	Johnny Gossamer	Also producer
2013	Get Lucky	Kramer	Also producer
2014	Plastic	Clarkson	Also producer
2015	Rise of the Footsoldier 2: Reign of the General	Tony Tucker	Flashback
2016	Away	Landlord	Also producer
2017	Bonded by Blood 2	Tony Tucker	
2017	Fanged Up	Howard Storm	Also producer
2017	Rise of the Footsoldier 3: The Pat Tate Story	Tony Tucker	Also executive producer
2019	Once Upon a Time in London	Jack 'Spot' Comer	Also producer
2019	Rise of the Footsoldier: Marbella	Tony Tucker	Also executive producer
2021	Rise of the Footsoldier: Origins	Tony Tucker	Also producer
2026	The Last Heist	Waldorf	Also producer
