= Gary Lewis (actor) =

Scottish actor (born 1957)

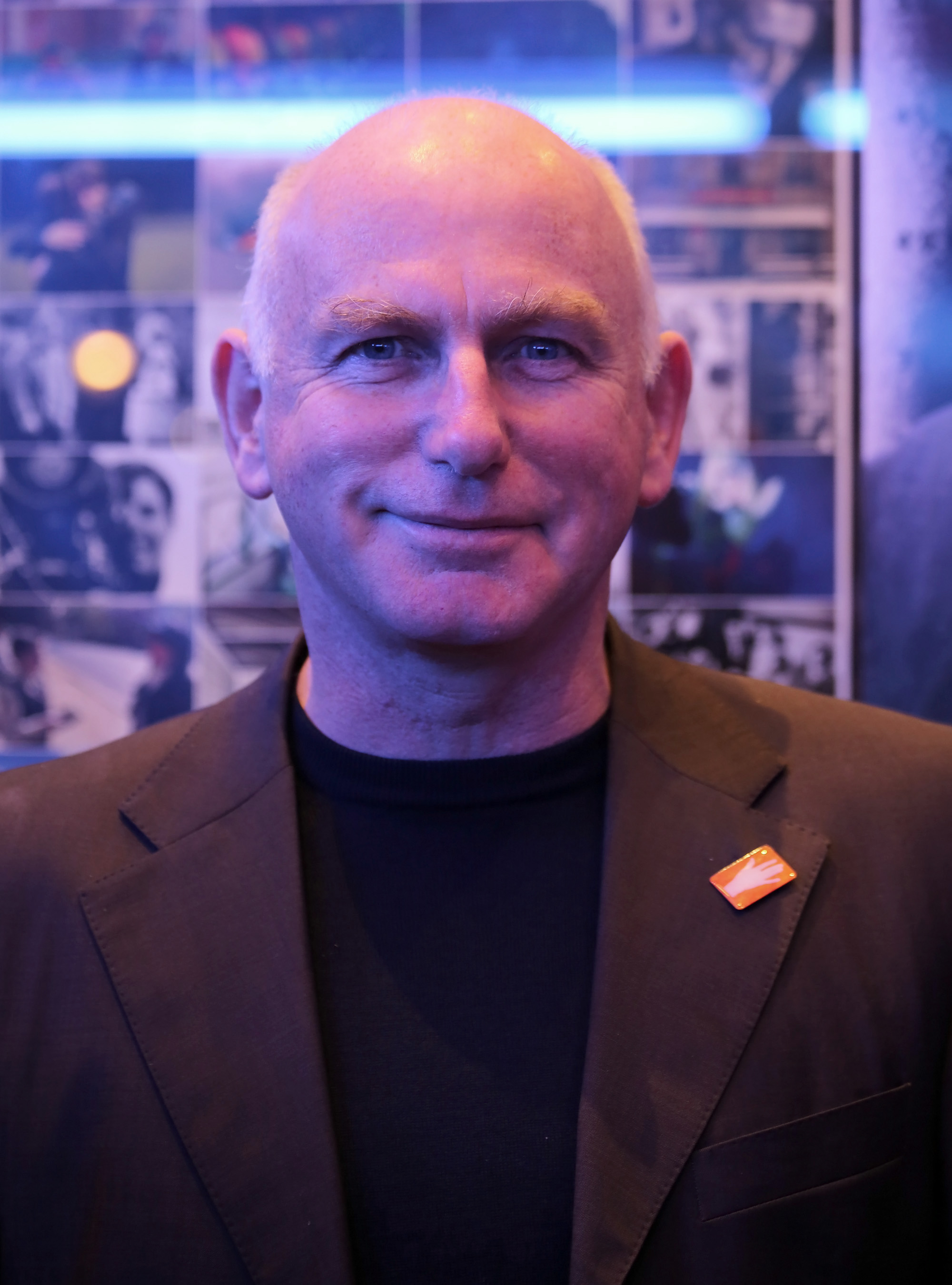
- Lewis in 2012
- Born: Gary Stevenson; 30 November 1957 (age 68); Easterhouse, Glasgow, Scotland
- Occupation: Actor
- Years active: 1993–present

Gary Stevenson (born 30 November 1957), better known as Gary Lewis, is a Scottish actor. He has had roles in films such as Billy Elliot (2000), Gangs of New York (2002), Joyeux Noël (2005) and Eragon (2006), as well as major roles in the television docudrama Supervolcano, the Starz series Outlander, and the BBC One thriller Vigil.

For Billy Elliot he received a nomination for the BAFTA Film Award for Best Actor in a Supporting Role and for Mo (2010) he received a nomination for the BAFTA TV Award for Best Supporting Actor for playing Adam Ingram.

== Early life ==
Stevenson was born on 30 November 1957 in Easterhouse, Glasgow, the middle of three children; his father was a coppersmith and his mother worked in a local biscuit factory. After leaving school, he had a series of jobs, including as a street sweeper and working in a library.

He completed a social science degree at Glasgow College of Technology (now Glasgow Caledonian University), graduating with honours in 1983. Encouraged by his high school English teacher, he read voraciously and eventually decided to pursue an acting career.

== Career ==
=== Theatre ===
In 1979, Lewis starred in writer Freddy Anderson's Fringe First Award-winning play Krassivy, based on the life of Socialist school teacher John Maclean. Although he had pursued amateur theatrics, Lewis was 32 before he committed to acting, joining Robert Carlyle's newly formed Raindog Theatre. There he performed in plays such as One Flew Over the Cuckoo's Nest, Ecstasy and Wasted.

He also worked with the 7:84 Theatre Company on The Grapes of Wrath, The Arches Theatre Company's production of Harold Pinter's The Birthday Party, and starred in One Two Hey by Glaswegian author James Kelman.

=== Film work ===
==== 1993–2004 ====
In 1993, with the support of his friend actor-director Peter Mullan, Lewis was cast in the short film Close. After working together on the short, both actors appeared in Danny Boyle's 1994 thriller Shallow Grave, alongside Ewan McGregor and Christopher Eccleston. Lewis also was featured in Mullan's subsequent shorts Good Day for the Bad Guys (1995) and the award-winning Fridge (1996).

Lewis joined director Kenneth Loach's unofficial stock company, lending support to his two mentors in separate films. With Robert Carlyle, he co-starred in Carla's Song (1996), while he played a recovering alcoholic alongside Mullan in My Name Is Joe (1998). Between the two films, Lewis was featured in Sigma Films' short California Sunshine (1997). He again worked with Mullan, who cast Lewis as over-righteous elder sibling Thomas in Orphans (1998), an examination of a dysfunctional family. That same year he was featured in director Albert Pyun's independent film Postmortem, director Sean McGuire's short film The Good Son, director Kenny Glenaan's short The Whirlpool, short film The Lucky Suit opposite Robert Carlyle, and screenwriter Barry Gornell's short film Sonny's Pride.

In 1999, Lewis starred in Ayub Khan Din's dramatic comedy East is East, and Bill Forsyth's comedy Gregory's Two Girls. He went on to star with Max Beesley in The Match (1999).

He landed an international breakthrough in Billy Elliot (2000). Lewis's portrayal of a grief-stricken father, coping with the 1984-85 miner's strike and raising a son who wants to become a ballet dancer, earned him a BAFTA nomination for Best Actor in a Supporting Role.

In 2000, Lewis starred in May Miles Thomas's drama One Life Stand. Adapted as a film, it premiered at the Edinburgh Film Festival, featuring Michael Caine as a boxing coach who was possibly involved in a murder, and released as Shiner. It screened at the San Sebastian Film Festival. Lewis finished the year with several short films, including What Where, a 12-minute short with Sean McGinley based upon Samuel Beckett's play of the same name, director David Mackenzie's Marcie's Dowry, The Elevator alongside Ashley Walters, Long Haul alongside Simone Lahbib, Clean with actor Stephen McCole, and director David McKay's Caesar. He appeared in an additional short film in 2001, Rob of the Rovers, which followed a day in the life of gym teacher Rob Meadows.

Lewis worked with director Giles MacKinnon twice in 2002. Revenge thriller The Escapist, which featured Lewis in the role of Ron, was followed by a turn as Detective Inspector French in the crime drama Pure. He went to Rome's Cinecittà Studios to join the ensemble cast of Martin Scorsese's Gangs of New York, an epic tale of gang warfare among the lower classes in 1860s New York City. Lewis portrayed McGloin, an Irish-American meant to embody the shift in mid-nineteenth century attitudes towards other immigrants.

2003 was another strong year with Lewis playing different roles. The first was Posh Pictures' The Fall of Shug McCracken, which tackled the subject of employee theft and labour unions. Next was Danish director Soren Kragh-Jacobsen's film Skagerrak, a romantic drama set in Scotland, which saw Lewis in a supporting role as a local Glaswegian. The last, a film noir drama from director and writer May Miles Thomas titled Solid Air, which is about the relationship between a sickly father (Maurice Roeves) and his compulsive gambler son (Brian McCardie).

==== 2004–2013 ====
Working with director Kenneth Loach again, Lewis starred in the 2004 love story Ae Fond Kiss..., which takes its name from a Robert Burns poem. That same year, he had a role in director Friðrik Þór Friðriksson's drama Niceland (Population 1.000.002) alongside Peter Capaldi and Kerry Fox. His next project was Stephen Whittaker's The Rocket Post. Filmed on the island of Taransay, Scotland, the film explores a German scientist's idea to deliver mail via rockets in the late 1930s. Director Peter Timm's film My Brother Is a Dog, features Lewis as the Antiquitätenhändler in a film about a young girl wishing for a dog. Lewis ended the year with two films about the post 9/11 tension between the Western and Arab worlds. First was a supporting role in writer Simon Beaufoy's Yasmin, set in Northern England before and after the 9/11 attacks. Second was Sally Potter's fourth feature film Yes, which views the post-traumatic rift through the lens of two lovers caught in the divide.

In 2005, Lewis starred in Christian Carion's international production of the film Joyeux Noël. Set in WWI, the film explores the "Christmas Truce" of 1914 between the armies of three countries. In a departure from previous films, Lewis was next featured in director Danny Cannon's football film Goal! The Dream Begins, which focuses on a Mexican football player trying out for the Newcastle United Football Club. Clive Gordon's 2006 film Cargo, a psychological thriller, featured Lewis opposite Daniel Bruhl and Peter Mullan. As the skipper of a bankrupt Scottish fishing trawler in True North, Lewis and actor Martin Compston tackle the subject of migrant smuggling and the effects it has on those making the journey. At the end of 2005, Lewis starred as Hrothgar in 20th Century Fox's live action adaptation of Christopher Paolini's hit fantasy trilogy Eragon.

The 2008 British black comedy Three and Out (released as A Deal Is A Deal in Australia), from director Johnathan Gershfield, saw Lewis in the supporting role of Callaghan. The film focuses on a train conductor who tries to use a little known three strikes rule of the London train service to force an early retirement and payout for himself. Screened at the Edinburgh Film Festival, Lewis's next film was director Robert Rae's debut film Trouble Sleeping, which tells the story of a Palestinian refugee's struggles in the UK. Psychological thriller Dorothy Mills, directed by Agnes Merlet, featured Lewis as the brainwashing pastor of a small community on a bleak Irish island. His last film of 2008 was Mark Aldridge's drama Blessed, alongside James Nesbitt and Lil Woods.

Reprising the role of Mal Braithwaite, Lewis began 2009 with the third instalment of Andrew Morahan's football series entitled Goal! III: Taking On the World. Wasted, his next film from filmmakers Caroline Paterson and Stuart Davids, treated the subject of homelessness in Glasgow, Scotland. From there he was cast in the Danish film Valhalla Rising, alongside Mads Mikkelsen, and director Christian Carion's Cold War thriller Farewell (L'Affaire Farewell). Lewis returned to short films in 2010 with director Tom Shrapnel's Eat Me, Tribeca Film Festival Judge's Award nominee The Terms, Robert James Armstrong's Little Green Bag, and Vocation opposite James Chalmers. He was also featured in Peter Mullan's gang drama Neds.

2011 showcased Lewis in two additional short films. The first, from director and writer Raisah Ahmed, titled Last Order, featured Lewis alongside Leann O'Kasi and David Elliot. The second was filmmaker Gregor Johnstone's comedy Rule of Thumb, which saw Lewis as the school janitor during a disastrous standoff. In 2012, Lewis appeared in two feature films. The Strange Case of Wilhelm Reich, which explored psychiatrist Wilhelm Reich's career and subsequent investigation by the FDA and other government agencies. He played Dr. Donald Cameron, who was President of the American, Canadian and World Psychiatric Associations. When the Lights Went Out starred Lewis as Father Clifford, a local priest who performs an exorcism on a house plagued by a poltergeist. The film is based on the real-life experiences of director Pat Holden's mother and aunt in 1970s West Yorkshire. Lewis's next role was Andrew Griffin's short film The Gift (2012), which was screened at the New York International Independent Film Festival in 2013.

Thirteen years after first working with May Thomas Miles in One Life Stand, Lewis reunited with the filmmaker in 2013 for the film version of her BAFTA winning interactive website The Devil's Plantation. Both the website and film are based on archaeologist Harry Bell's belief that Glasgow, Scotland was laid out based upon a secret, hidden design he called the Secret Geometry. Lewis starred as Bell, opposite Kate Dickie’s psychiatric patient Mary Ross, as their lives intertwine. He then appeared in Scottish romantic comedy Not Another Happy Ending as Benny Lockhart opposite Karen Gillan and fellow Outlander alumni Stanley Weber. Director Alberto Arvelo's The Liberator, the story of Venezuelan freedom fighter Simón Bolívar, featured Lewis as Colonel Rooke of the Irish Brigade while director John S. Baird's psychological police drama Filth, saw Lewis guest star as Gus. Later that year, Lewis featured in Luca Barbareschi's The Mercury Factor, which takes on the issue of adulterated food. Returning to independent films at the end of 2013, Lewis starred alongside Teresina Moscatiello in the German production Waiting and in Marcus McPeake's short film For Gracie.

==== 2014–present ====
First time British director Daniel Wolfe's thriller Catch Me Daddy (2014), which screened at the Director's Fortnight strand and focused on a teenager and her boyfriend who flee from her overbearing father, portrays Lewis as hired thug Tony, who is sent to retrieve the runaways. In 2015, Lewis appeared in short films, working twice with director Gordon Napier. The first film was the drama La Chasse, in which Lewis portrayed the protagonist's deceased father through a voice over. Second was the 25-minute short Tide, which saw Lewis star as lobster fisherman Alasdaire as he watches the life he knew erode into modern practices. Also in 2015, Lewis was featured in Joshua J. Krull's German language short film The Heavy Load.

In 2018, Lewis returned to feature films with director Marcus H. Rosenmüller's football flick The Keeper. The film is a story of German goalkeeper Bert Trautmann, who helped Manchester City win the FA Cup final in 1956. He also featured opposite Gerard Butler and Peter Mullan in Kristoffer Nyholm's 1930s era thriller, The Vanishing. In 2021, he worked on a third Carion title, a remake of the 2017 French language Mon Garçon, My Son, set in Scotland. In 2023, he joined the Marvel Cinematic Universe as Emperor Dro'ge in The Marvels.

=== Television ===
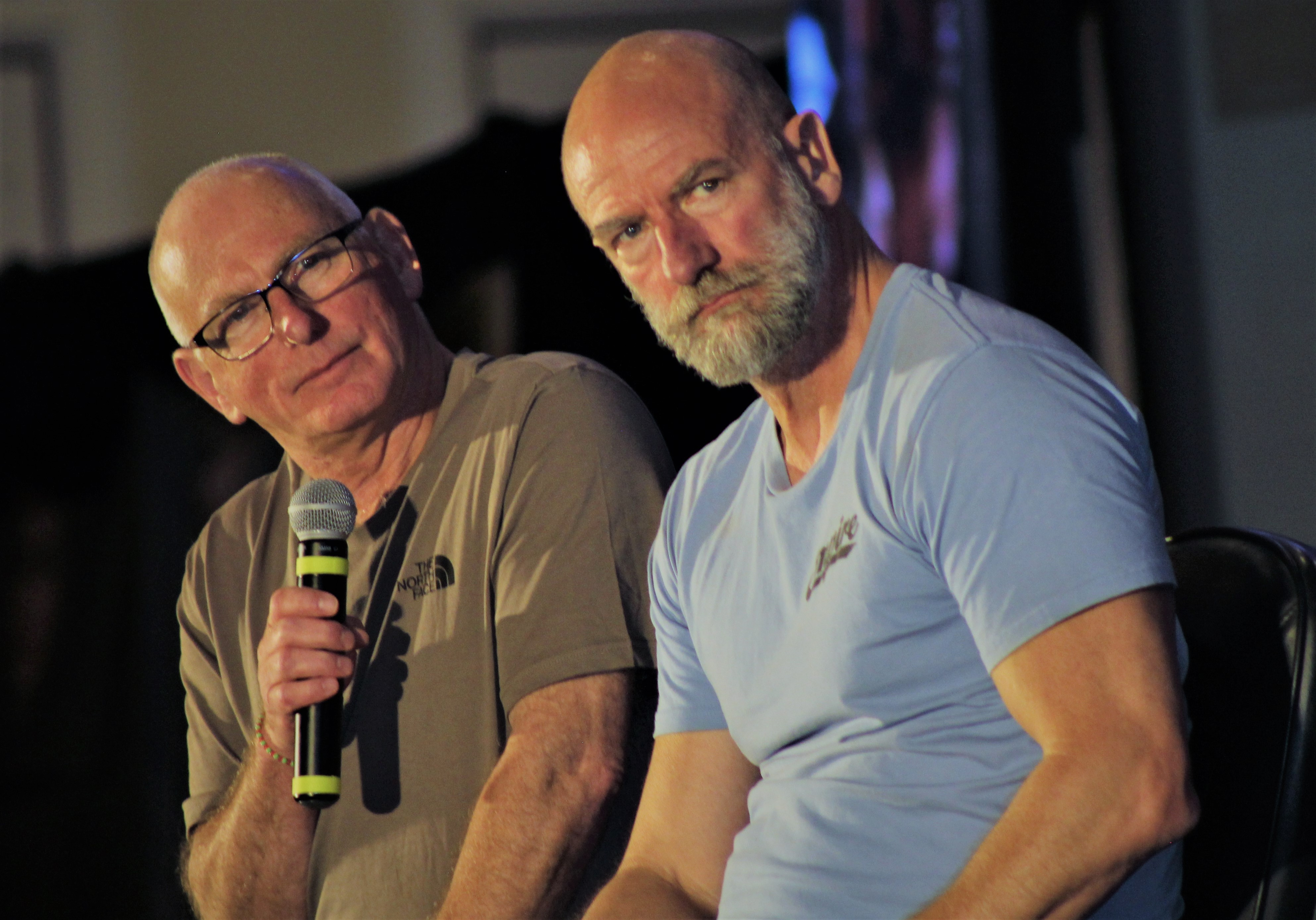
Lewis (L) and Graham McTavish (R) at the Creation Entertainment's Outlander convention in Las Vegas on 15 July 2018

==== 1993–2013 ====
Lewis's first professional role, in 1993, was in BBC's anthology series Screen One, in a feature-length episode entitled Down Among the Big Boys. The standalone film, also starring Douglas Henshall and Billy Connolly, focuses on the marriage of a policeman's son to a criminal's daughter. His next project was a 1995 made-for-TV movie from writer/director David Kane. Ruffian Hearts is a romantic comedy set in a Glasgow tenement where Lewis's character resided. Between 1995 and 1999, Lewis appeared in several episodes of series such as Doctor Finlay, Hamish MacBeth opposite Robert Carlyle, BBC medical drama Cardiac Arrest, BBC anthology Screen Two's feature length Flowers of the Forest, school drama Hope and Glory, and BBC Scotland's medical drama Life Support. During that time, he also appeared in director Mark Haber's made-for-TV film The Princess Stallion and BAFTA winning television film Coming Soon.

In 2002, Lewis starred in CBC's award-winning TV film The Many Trials of One Jane Doe, which is based on a true story of a Toronto woman who challenged the police and their investigation after being raped, through a lengthy court battle. 2003 saw Lewis return to the BBC for director Antonia Bird's compelling TV film Rehab, a semi-improvised film about the rehabilitation of people addicted to drugs.

That same year he featured in scriptwriter Andrew Davies's made for TV historical drama Warrior Queen, which detailed the birth of Great Britain. His next project, Gunpowder, Treason and Plot (2004), was a four part mini-series for the BBC on the lives of Mary Queen of Scots and her son James VI of Scotland/James I of England. Lewis portrayed historical figure John Knox, a prominent leader of the Scottish Reformation who supervised the preparation of the Reformed Church of Scotland's constitution and liturgy.

The BBC and The Discovery Channel partnered in 2005 to produce a made-for-TV film, Supervolcano, that proposed a scenario where the magma chamber beneath Yellowstone National Park erupted. Filmed in Vancouver and Yellowstone, it starred Lewis alongside Michael Riley and Shaun Johnston. Between 2006 and 2008, Lewis appeared in a wide range episodic television programs, including ITV's crime thriller Rebus, Prime Suspect 7: The Final Act alongside Helen Mirren, ITV's showcase series Comedy Lab, the second of two episodes he appeared in (the first was in 1999), Channel 4's mini series City of Vice, Wired alongside Jodie Whittaker, crime drama Taggart the second of two episodes he appeared in (the first was in 1996), and BBC comedy Rab C. Nesbitt.

In 2010 Lewis portrayed Adam Ingram in the Channel 4 drama Mo, a biopic of former Secretary of State for Northern Ireland Mo Mowlam, a role that saw him nominated for a BAFTA Television Award in the category of Best Supporting Actor. He went on to appear alongside actor Kevin McKidd in BBC Scotland's drama One Night in Emergency, which was based upon Homer's The Odyssey and written by Gregory Burke, as well as the BBC's adaptation of RAF fighter pilot Geoffrey Wellum's WWII autobiography First Light. Lewis played Mac alongside the now star of Outlander, Sam Heughan, who played the 18 year old fighter pilot Wellum Lewis rounded out the year by featuring in series seven of the BBC's long-running crime drama New Tricks.

Lewis appeared in several television miniseries in 2011. The first was episode five of the BBC's Outcasts, which saw Lewis portraying Patrick Baxter. Next was an episode of the BBC drama The Body Farm where he portrayed Jimmy West, butler to an elderly man accused of murder. Finally, Lewis appeared in the BBC mini-series Young James Herriot, which focused on the All Creatures Great and Small author's time as a student at Glasgow Veterinary College, in the role of Professor Quinton Gunnel. He also featured in several TV series including the enigmatic wizard Alator in two episodes of the BBC fantasy drama Merlin, Robert Winter in ITV's crime drama Vera, and Detective Novakowski in Canada's true crime drama Dual Suspects.

In 2012 Lewis starred in the two-part television miniseries L'Olimpiade Nascosta, on Italy's Rai 1, which tells the story of symbolic Olympic Games held by the prisoners and their captors while in Polish Nazi concentration camps. He went on to feature in a season two episode of the BAFTA winning show Case Histories, alongside Jason Isaacs.

==== 2014–present ====
2014 saw Lewis appear as DS MacNeil in the Silent Witness two-part episode "In A Lonely Place". This was the second of two guest starring roles on the hit series, the first was as Edwin Stickley in a 2008 two-part episode entitled "Terror". He next appeared in episode six of Sky One's mini-series The Smoke, which chronicled the lives of a group of London firefighters, and the BAFTA winning TV film Glasgow Girls, which featured Lewis as a teacher supporting his pupils in their fight to save their classmate from deportation. From 2014 to 2016, Lewis appeared in the recurring role of Colum MacKenzie, Laird of the MacKenzie clan, on Starz's time travel drama Outlander, based upon best-selling author Diana Gabaldon's novels of the same name.

Death in Paradise, BBC's lighthearted police drama set on an island in the Caribbean, featured Lewis in the guest starring role of Bill Williams early in 2015. Later that year he starred as Mike McAvett in BBC Two's mini-series Stonemouth, an adaptation of Scottish author Iain Banks's thriller of the same name. In BBC One's four-part drama One of Us (aka Retribution), a triple homicide murder mystery, Lewis featured as farm manager Alistair. From there he starred in ITV's British crime drama The Level, as father of protagonist Nancy Devlin (Karla Crome). Lewis ended 2016 by once again working with costar Douglas Henshall in ITV's three-part mini-series In Plain Sight, which was based on the true story of Lanarkshire Detective William Muncie's quest to bring serial rapist and murderer Peter Manuel to justice in the 1950s.

Lewis signed on to co-star opposite Catherine Walker and Søren Malling in MTG Studio's drama Rig 45, set during the investigation of a fatal accident on a North Sea oil rig, in early 2018. He next appeared in season three of Netflix's Canadian fur trade drama Frontier, alongside Jason Momoa and Zoe Boyle. During the first quarter of 2019, Lewis guest starred in series finale of BBC Scotland's hit comedy Still Game, which focused on two Glaswegians and their reactions to the world.

== Filmography ==
Key
†	Denotes projects that have not yet been released

=== Television ===
Year	Title	Role	Notes
1993	Screen One	Jacketless	Episode: "Down Among the Big Boys"
1995	Ruffian Hearts	Brendan	Television film
1995	Doctor Finlay	Philip Calder	Episode: "No Time For Heroes"
1996	Hamish MacBeth	Dave the House-Seller	Episode: "Isobel Pulls It Off"
1996	Cardiac Arrest	Mike Lucas	Episode: "The Oedipus Effect"
1996	Screen Two	George	Episode: "Flowers in the Forest"
1996	Taggart	Price's Lawyer	Episode: "Devil's Advocate Part 1"
1997	The Princess Stallion	Rab	Television film
1998	My Name Is Joe	Shanks	
1999	Coming Soon	Union Rep	Television film
1999	Hope and Glory	Malcolm Bird	Episode #1.5
1999	Life Support	Greg Malloy	Episode: "Trust"
1999	Comedy Lab	Gregor Munroe	Episode: "Heart and Sole"
2002	The Many Trials of One Jane Doe	Jeremy Sharp	Television film
2003	Rehab	Tommy	Television film
2003	Warrior Queen	Magior the Shaman	Television film
2004	Gunpowder, Treason & Plot	John Knox	Miniseries
2005	Supervolcano	Jock Galvin	Television film
2006	Rebus	Gregor Jack	Episode: "Strip Jack"
2006	Prime Suspect 7: The Final Act	Tony Sturdy	2 episodes
2007	Comedy Lab	Alec	Episode: "The Smallest Game in Town"
2008	City of Vice	Robert Anderson	Episode #1.4
2008	Wired	Lewis Stone	Episode #1.1
2008	Taggart	Donald Booth	Episode: "Homesick"
2008	Rab C. Nesbitt	Frank Owen	Episode: "Clean"
2008	Silent Witness	Edwin Stickley	Episode: "Terror"
2010	Mo	Adam Ingram	Television film
2010	One Night in Emergency	Patient	Television film
2010	First Light	Mac	Television film
2010	New Tricks	Alex Close	Episode: "Dark Chocolate"
2011	Outcasts	Pak	Episode #1.5
2011	Vera	Robert Winter	Episode: "Telling Tales"
2011	Dual Suspects	Detective Novakowski	Episode: "Body in the Orchard"
2011	The Body Farm	Jimmy West	Episode #1.2
2011	Young James Herriot	Professor Quentin Gunnell	3 episodes
2011–2012	Merlin	Alator	2 episodes
2012	L'olimpiade nascosta	Alex	Television film
2013	Case Histories	Barry	Episode: "Started Early, Took My Dog"
2014	Silent Witness	DS MacNeil	Episode: "In A Lonely Place (Part 1 & 2)"
2014	The Smoke	Hamish	Episode #1.6
2014	Glasgow Girls	Euan Girvan	Television film
2015	Death in Paradise	Bill Williams	Episode: "She Was Murdered Twice"
2015	Stonemouth	Mike MacAvett	2 episodes
2014–2016	Outlander	Colum MacKenzie	7 episodes
2016	One of Us (aka Retribution)	Alastair	4 episodes
2016	The Level	Gil Devlin	6 episodes
2016	In Plain Sight	William Watt	Episode #1.2
2018	Frontier	Edward Emberly	3 episodes
2018–2020	Rig 45	Douglas	12 episodes
2019	Still Game	Rab	Episode: "Over the Hill"
2019–2020	His Dark Materials	Thorold	4 episodes
2021	It's A Sin	Duncan Finch	Episode #1.2
2021–2023	Vigil	DSU Colin Robertson	11 episodes
2022	The Bay	Vinnie Morrison	6 episodes
2022	Granite Harbour	Shay Coburn	3 episodes
2024	Franklin	Richard Oswald	2 episodes
2025	A Thousand Blows	Jac Mac	
2025	Down Cemetery Road	Captain Donny	3 episodes
2027	The Twin †	Keith McIntosh	Post-production

=== Film ===
Year	Title	Role	Notes
1993	Close	Fumigation Man	Short film
1994	Shallow Grave	Male Visitor	
1995	Good Day for the Bad Guys	Jockie	Short film
1995	Fridge	Rudy	Short film
1996	Carla's Song	Sammy	
1997	California Sunshine	Taylor	Short film
1998	My Name Is Joe	Shanks	
1998	Postmortem	Wallace	Independent film
1998	Orphans	Thomas	
1998	The Good Son	Gabriel Doyle	Short film
1998	Sonny's Pride	Alec	Short film
1999	East Is East	Mark	
1999	The Match	Dead Eye	
1999	Gregory's Two Girls	Mr. McCane	
2000	Billy Elliot	Jackie Elliot	
2000	One Life Stand	Jackie Clarke	Screened at the Edinburgh Film Festival
2000	Shiner	Vic	
2000	Marcie's Dowry		Short film
2000	What Where	Bom / Bim / Bem	Short film
2000	The Elevator	Business Man	Short film
2000	Long Haul		Short film
2000	Clean		Short film
2000	Caesar	McGurke	Short film
2002	The Escapist	Ron	
2002	Pure	Detective Inspector French	
2002	Gangs of New York	McGloin	
2003	The Fall of Shug McCracken	Crawford	
2003	Skagerrak	Willie	
2003	Solid Air	John Doran	
2004	Ae Fond Kiss...	Danny	
2004	Niceland (Population. 1.000.002)	Max	
2004	The Rocket Post	Jimmy Roach	
2004	Yasmin	Detective	
2004	Yes	Billy	
2004	My Brother Is a Dog	Antiquitätenhändler	
2005	Joyeux Noël	le pasteur Palmer	
2005	Goal! The Dream Begins	Mal Braithwaite	
2005	Rob of the Rovers	Rob Meadows	Short film
2006	Cargo	Herman	
2006	True North	The Skipper	
2006	Eragon	Hrothgar	
2008	Three and Out	Callaghan	(aka A Deal Is A Deal)
2008	Trouble Sleeping	Detective	Screened at the Edinburgh Film Festival
2008	Dorothy Mills	Pastor Ross	
2008	Blessed	Howie	
2009	Goal! III: Taking On the World	Mal Braithwaite	
2009	Wasted	Gary	
2009	Valhalla Rising	Kare – Christian Viking	
2009	Farewell	Scottish Chemist	
2010	Neds	Mr. Russell	
2010	Little Green Bag	Dad	Short film
2010	Vocation	Father Sweeney	Short film
2011	Last Order	Gaz	Short film
2012	The Rule of Thumb	The Janitor	Short film
2012	The Strange Case of Wilhelm Reich	Dr. Cameron	
2012	When the Lights Went Out	Father Clifton	
2012	The Gift	Policeman	Short film
2013	The Devil's Plantation	Harry Bell	
2013	Not Another Happy Ending	Benny Lockhart (Dad)	
2013	The Liberator	James Rooke	
2013	Filth	Gus	
2013	The Mercury Conspiracy	Gregory Poulson	
2013	Waiting	Soldier	
2013	For Gracie	Trevor	Short film
2014	Catch Me Daddy	Tony	
2015	La Chasse	Father (voice over)	Short film
2015	The Heavy Load	Actor	Short film
2015	Tide	Alasdair MacInnes	Short film
2018	The Keeper	Jock Thompson	
2018	The Vanishing	Kenny	
2021	Falling for Figaro	Ramsay Macfayden	
2021	My Son	Inspector Roy	
2022	Stella	Lord Rig	
2023	The Marvels	Emperor Dro'ge	

== Awards and nominations ==
Year	Award	Category	Nominated work	Result
1998	Gijón International Film Festival	Best Actor	Orphans	Won
2001	British Academy Film Awards	Best Performance By An Actor in a Supporting Role	Billy Elliot	Nominated
2001	London Critics Circle Film Awards	British Actor of the Year	Billy Elliot	Nominated
2001	Flaiano Film Festival	Best Actor	Billy Elliot	Won
2001	Screen Actors Guild Awards	Ensemble Film Cast	Billy Elliot	Nominated
2002	Awards Circuit Community Awards	Best Cast Ensemble	Gangs of New York	Nominated
2010	British Academy Television Awards	Best Supporting Actor	Mo	Nominated
2017	Satellite Awards	Best Ensemble (Television)	Outlander	Won
