= My Brother Is a Dog =

- Theatrical release poster
- Directed by: Peter Timm
- Written by: Thomas Springer
- Produced by: Thomas Springer; Helmut G Weber; Mike Downey; Sam Taylor; Michiel de Rooij; Burny Bos; Siegmund Grewenig; Zorana Piggott; Sabine Veenendaal; Wolfgang Wegmann
- Starring: Maria Ehrich; Martin Lindow; Christine Newbauer
- Cinematography: Achim Poulheim
- Edited by: Barbara Hennings
- Production companies: Tradewind Pictures; Bos Bros. Film & TV Productions; Film and Music Entertainment; Westdeutscher Rundfunk
- Distributed by: Solo Filmverleih
- Release date: 11 November 2004
- Running time: 96 minutes
- Countries: Germany; Netherlands; United Kingdom
- Language: German

My Brother Is a Dog is a 2004 German-language family film directed by Peter Timm and starring Maria Ehrich, Martin Lindow and Christine Neubauer.

== Cast ==
- Maria Ehrich as Marietta
- Irm Hermann as Oma Gerda
- Christine Neubauer as Mutter Maria
- Martin Lindow as Vater Martin
- Hans-Laurin Beyerling as Tobias
- Ellen ten Damme as Ica Müller
- Gary Lewis as Antiquitätenhändler
- Julia Ferch as Lisa
- Kai Ivo Baulitz as Regie-Assistant
- Renate Hiltl as Süßwaren-Verkäuferin
- Karsten Blumenthal as Fahrer
- Peter Schneider as Fahrer
- Moritz Führmann as Maler
- Arved Birnbaum as Maler
- Thomas Bieberstein as Hundeverkäufer
- Christof Wackernagel as Projektleiter
- Aurel Manthei as Security-Man
- Norbert Heisterkamp as Wachmann
- Michael Günther as Wachmann
- Hans Timo Beyerling as Junge
- Nikolai Mohr as Junge
- Komi Togbonou as Medizinmann
- Thomas Gimbel as Polizist
- Ingolf Lück as Regisseur
- Brigitte Janner as Kundin
- Gustl vom Hause Holzhauer as Toby the dog

== Awards ==
Biberach Film Festival

- In 2004, My Brother is a Dog won the ‘Honorable Mention’ for Peter Timm.

Chicago International Children's Film Festival

- In 2005, My Brother is a Dog won the ‘Best of the Fest’ for Peter Timm.

Oulu International Children's Film Festival

- Peter Timm was nominated for the ‘Starboy Award’ in 2004.

Undine Awards, Austria

- My Brother is a Dog was nominated for the ‘Undine Award’ for ‘best Debut, Female – Film’ for Maria Ehrich.
