= Paul Ferris (Scottish writer) =

Scottish author and organised crime figure (1963–2026)

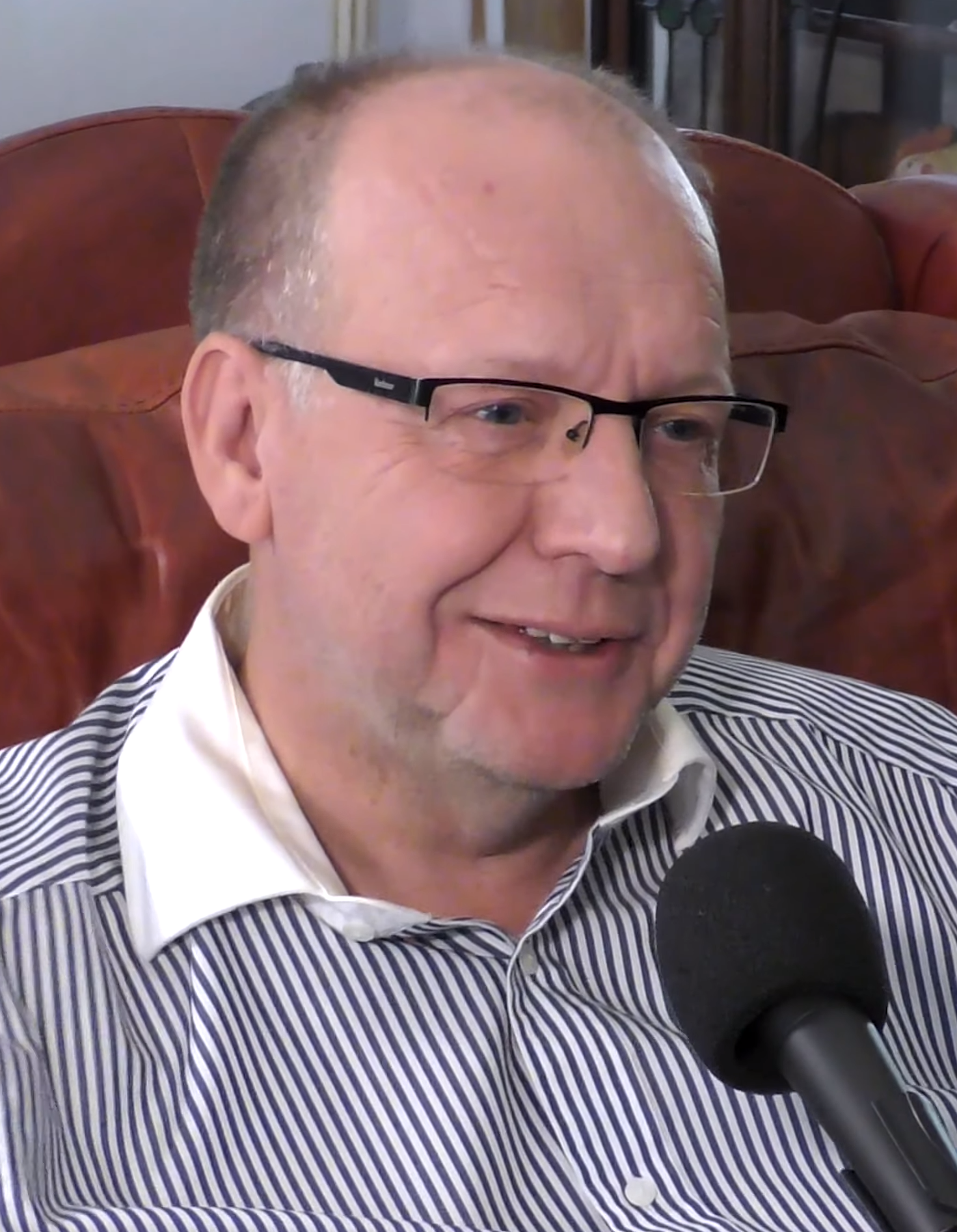
- Ferris in 2020
- Born: Paul John Ferris; 10 November 1963; Glasgow, Scotland
- Died: 6 October 2026 (aged 62); Glasgow, Scotland
- Occupation: Author

Paul John Ferris (10 November 1963 – 6 October 2026) was a Scottish author and organised crime figure. Ferris was an enforcer for Glasgow "Godfather" Arthur Thompson in the early 1980s. Known for his ruthlessness and extreme violence, he rose to a prominent position in the city's criminal underworld.

Ferris served a prison sentence for weapons possession in 1984 and believed he had been betrayed by the Thompsons. In 1991 Thompson's son, Arthur Jr., was shot dead. Ferris was charged with his murder and subsequently found not guilty after what was the longest criminal trial in Scottish history at that time. He was imprisoned again from 1998 to 2002 for trading in firearms and possessing explosives. Ferris was also involved in a long-running feud with Tam McGraw.

His first book was published in 2001 while he was in prison. Upon his release he wrote three more books about crime, and was involved in the security industry.

== Early life ==
Paul John Ferris was born on 10 November 1963 in the Blackhill district of Glasgow to a Protestant father and a Catholic mother, and was raised as a Catholic. Ferris was the youngest of six children, with one older brother Billy and four sisters Carol, Cath, Janet and Maureen. Ferris was bullied for several years by members of a local criminal family, the Welshes, which is thought to have resulted in him developing the skin disorder psoriasis. He knew Glasgow gangland figure Ian McAteer from childhood.

Ferris began his life of crime as a teenager with a series of revenge knife attacks on the Welsh brothers, and was arrested aged 17 for assault and robbery and sent to Longriggend Remand Centre. He was bailed after several weeks, and while awaiting trial fled from the police after a car chase, as the car he was travelling in contained a shotgun and knives. After several weeks on the run, Ferris was captured by the police and returned to Longriggend to await trial. At his trial for the assault and robbery charges he was sentenced to three months in Glenochil Detention Centre. After his release from Glenochil he returned to court to face charges relating to the car chase and was sentenced to a year in Glenochil Young Offenders Institution. Several weeks after the end of his sentence he was arrested while attempting to rob a jeweller's shop and returned to Longriggend. Upon his release he continued to take his revenge on the Welsh brothers, which brought him to the attention of Glasgow underworld figure Arthur Thompson, known as "The Godfather".

== Criminal career ==
Ferris became involved with Thompson's crime empire aged 19, when he became an enforcer, collecting debts on behalf of Thompson, and carried out stabbings, slashings, blindings and knee-cappings. A year later Ferris was arrested following an incident where shots were fired at Willie Gibson and four of his relatives while they were travelling home from a night at a pub, with Gibson's cousin John Hogg sustaining a bullet wound to his thigh. The three relatives failed to identify Ferris at an identity parade, but Gibson picked him out as the man who fired the shots. Ferris was charged with four counts of attempted murder, and was remanded to Longriggend. At his trial several months later he was acquitted on all four counts with a not proven verdict.

Now aged 21, Ferris immediately returned to his work as an enforcer for Thompson, and was soon arrested again and charged with possession of offensive weapons after a pickaxe handle and knives were found in his car. While awaiting trial he was involved in a stabbing, and fled to Thompson's holiday home in Rothesay on the Isle of Bute. Within a day of arriving there, he was arrested by armed police and charged with various offences including attempted murder and possession of heroin with intent to supply, and was remanded to HM Prison Barlinnie. The attempted murder charge was dropped a week later and Ferris was found not guilty of the drugs charge, but he received an 18-month sentence for possession of offensive weapons. After being released from prison Ferris stopped working for Thompson and started a company named Cottage Conservatories specialising in double glazing and conservatories, but still remained active in the criminal underworld.

On 18 August 1991 Thompson's son, Arthur Jr. (nicknamed "Fat Boy"), died after being shot outside his home. Ferris was arrested following the killing, and was charged with murder and remanded to HM Prison Barlinnie. On the day of Thompson Jr.'s funeral the cortege passed a car containing the bodies of two friends of Ferris, Robert Glover and Joe "Bananas" Hanlon, who were also suspected of involvement in his death, and had been killed by gunshots to the head. At his trial in 1992 Ferris was defended by Donald Findlay, on the following charges:

- the murder of Arthur Thompson Jr., with help from Glover and Hanlon
- the attempted murder of Arthur Thompson Snr. by repeatedly driving a car at him in May 1990
- threatening to murder William Gillen and shooting him in the legs
- conspiracy to assault John "Jonah" McKenzie on 26 May 1991
- illegal possession of a firearm
- supplying heroin, cocaine, and ecstasy
- breach of the Bail Act

Over 300 witnesses were called to give evidence at a trial which lasted fifty four days and cost £4 million, at the time the longest and most expensive trial in Scottish legal history, and ended in Ferris being acquitted of all charges. After the trial Ferris returned to Glasgow and set up a car dealership named Jagger Autos, and also became a consultant for security firm Premier Security, which had a reported annual turnover of £6.2 million. He also maintained contacts in the underworld, including Paul Massey and Rab Carruthers in the north of England. In 1993 his brother Billy escaped from a prison escort after being allowed temporary release to visit his sick father, and was one of the six most wanted men in Britain until being captured in Blackpool. Later that year, Ferris accused the police of having a vendetta against his family after Billy was refused permission to attend the funeral of their father. In August 1994 Ferris received a £250 fine from a court in Manchester after being charged with possession of crack cocaine. He told the court "I'm no gangster", and claimed he used the drug to alleviate his psoriasis. In 1995 Ferris appeared in a television interview with John McVicar in which he remarked "If anyone was born into crime, it was me. Crime is in my blood", and also claimed he had "always used a weapon of sorts".

Ferris was arrested in London in 1997 following a two-year surveillance operation by MI5 and Special Branch. At his trial at the Old Bailey in July 1998 he was sentenced to ten years imprisonment after being convicted of conspiracy to sell or transfer prohibited weapons, conspiracy to deal in firearms and possessing explosives, although the sentence was reduced to seven years at the Court of Appeal in London in May 1999. While in prison Ferris co-authored his biography The Ferris Conspiracy with Reg McKay, which sold 20,000 copies while he was imprisoned. Ferris was released from Frankland Prison, County Durham in January 2002 pledging to give up his life of crime, and released a second book with McKay, a novel titled Deadly Divisions, in April 2002. That May he was sent back to prison for breaching the conditions of his parole after being involved in a knife fight with Tam McGraw, and an alleged connection with a £900,000 shipment of cannabis (later proven to be fictionalised by newspapers and police). Official reports say he was wounded in the knife fight, but witnesses say he was free of recent wounds. As to the cannabis shipment, the other accused had not been in contact with Ferris for many years. Ferris was released again in June 2002, and moved to Edinburgh.

== Freedom ==
Ferris started the company Frontline Security after being released from prison. In January 2004 Frontline Security were criticised when it was reported the company were guarding the Rosepark nursing home, where 14 pensioners had died in a fire. Relatives of the victims demanded to know why a company linked to Ferris had been hired. Three months later it emerged that Frontline Security had won a contract to protect speed cameras on the M8 motorway, with a police source stating "The fact this firm have been handed this speed camera contract is just plain ridiculous". Later the same year it emerged that the company had been paid taxpayers' money to protect Dumbarton Sheriff Court, and court bosses said they would not use the firm again.

He caused more controversy when it emerged he was being filmed for a fly-on-the-wall television show to be broadcast on Five. TV bosses were accused of glamourising his life of crime, with a Glasgow detective stating "Now we have Ferris the TV star – it makes you sick. He can try to become a Z-list celebrity all he wants, but he is a career criminal and no matter how many times he tries to reinvent himself, we will always know the truth". In April 2005 police in Edinburgh began investigating Ferris over concerns he was attempting to invest in the taxi trade in the city, and a month later plans for a film about Ferris's life emerged, starring Robert Carlyle and Oasis singer Liam Gallagher. Ferris released his third book Vendetta in October 2005, and followed that with an appearance at the Festival of Scottish Writing in Edinburgh in May 2006. This was followed by the release of his fourth book Villains in October 2006. In January 2007 Scottish Minister for Justice Cathy Jamieson announced a planned initiative to prevent convicted criminals from profiting from the publication of their memoirs, although Reg McKay has previously stated Ferris did not profit from the sale of the first book and that his motive was not financial.

A film based on his life, The Wee Man, starring Martin Compston as Ferris and John Hannah as Tam McGraw, was released in 2013. Another book, Unfinished Business, written with Steve Wraith and Stu Wheatman, was released in October 2018.

Ferris died at Queen Elizabeth Hospital in Glasgow, on 6 October 2026, aged 62.

== Bibliography ==
- The Ferris Conspiracy (12 March 2001, with Reg McKay)
- Deadly Divisions: The Spectre Chronicles (8 April 2002, with Reg McKay)
- Vendetta: Turning Your Back on Crime Can Be Deadly... (October 2005, with Reg McKay)
- Villains: It Takes One to Know One (1 October 2006, with Reg McKay)
