= The Wee Man =

2013 British independent gangster film

- Film poster
- Directed by: Ray Burdis
- Starring: Patrick Bergin; Simon DeSilva; Martin Compston; John Hannah; Steve Daly; Alastair Thomson Mills; Jim Sweeney
- Cinematography: Ali Asad
- Music by: John Beckett
- Distributed by: Carnaby International
- Release date: 18 January 2013
- Country: United Kingdom
- Language: English
- Box office: £460884

The Wee Man, also released as John Burns, is a 2013 British independent gangster film directed by Ray Burdis and starring Martin Compston and John Hannah. It depicts the true life story of Scottish gang leader Paul Ferris.

Due to the film's sympathetic portrayal of Ferris, Strathclyde Police refused to help the filmmakers make the film in Glasgow, Ferris's native city. The production team had to film in London instead due to the lack of support from the legal authorities in Glasgow.

== Plot ==
In 1990, in his cell in Barlinnie Prison in Glasgow, Paul Ferris reflects on his childhood.

Young Paul is told by his father to always beware of strangers, to always be loyal, and to be a "lion" and avoid following others actions. He witnesses the Banks brothers carry out an armed robbery, after which the Banks brothers harass Paul and kill his dog.

Teenage Paul is at a party when the Banks brothers crash it and wreck the house. Paul fetches a knife and returns to find two of the brothers sexually assaulting his girlfriend. He wounds them both and flees. His sister berates him as their older brother is serving life in prison for murder. Paul says he enjoyed the violence as he felt in control.

In prison, Paul arranges the killing of one of the Banks brothers. Upon his release Paul shuns a party thrown for him by Glasgow godfather Arthur Thompson, recalling that his father called Thompson "The Devil incarnate".

Paul argues with his wife Anne Marie over her fear of him being imprisoned or killed. In the pub Paul meets Arthur Thompson and his obnoxious, cocaine-addicted son Junior "Fat Boy" Thompson. Arthur praises Paul for the prison hit and gives him a job. Paul recalls as a child witnessing Arthur execute a man by shooting; and that he and his friends had taken money the from the dead man's wallet, money that the police confiscated when interviewing Paul about the murder.

Arthur confides to Paul that Junior has been scammed over £50,000 worth of drugs, and tasks Paul with retrieving the money. A car bomb kills Arthur's mother and hospitalises Arthur, who orders Paul and associate Tam "The Licensee" McGraw to find the culprits. They are told that the Banks brothers were responsible. Paul is overjoyed that Anne Marie is pregnant.

Junior reveals to Arthur his jealous rivalry of Paul, sparked by Arthur's praising of Paul. During a home invasion massacre of the Banks family, the rivalry escalates when Paul stops Junior from killing two of the Banks women. Junior slashes a father's face in front of his children, shocking Paul due to Anne Marie's pregnancy.

Paul tells Anne Marie he has become what he had always hated and wishes to leave Glasgow because of the slashing incident, and that he wants to turn his back on crime. Junior and McGraw frame Paul for a hit attempt on Arthur. He serves eighteen months in prison for possessing a weapon, after which he meets his new son and Anne Marie says she no longer loves him.

Junior has Paul's father beaten up in an alley. Later Junior is brutally executed outside Arthur's home by a masked assailant, who is addressed as "Paul" by the getaway driver. Paul is arrested for Junior's murder. With Paul in jail, Arthur sanctions the murder of Paul's associates Jimmy, Johnny, Bobby and Joe, in collaboration with McGraw. Paul learns of McGraw's betrayal and threatens revenge when he is released. Paul is acquitted of Junior's murder. Final scenes show McGraw escaping assassination and boarding a flight to Tenerife, but despairing as he notices Tam and Bob behind him on the plane.

Closing text tells the fates of the real-life characters: Anne Marie and Paul separated; after many attempts on his life, Arthur "The Godfather" Thompson died of natural causes at 61; Junior Thompson's murder remains unsolved; Arthur's wife Rita never got over Arthur and Junior's deaths and died of a broken heart; Tam McGraw died of a heart attack aged 55; Bobby and Joe's murders remain unsolved; Paul Ferris still lives in Glasgow, and has turned his back on crime.

== Cast ==
- Martin Compston as Paul Ferris
  - Daniel Kerr as young Paul Ferris
- Denis Lawson as Willie Ferris
- Patrick Bergin as Arthur Thompson
- Laura McMonagle as Anne Marie
- John Hannah as Tam McGraw
- Clare Grogan as Jenny Ferris
- Joy McAvoy as Cath Ferris
- Stephen McCole as Junior Thompson
- Andrew Marley as Young Jimmy
- Alastair Thomson Mills as Wilson
