= Steven Robertson =

Scottish actor (born 1977)

- Born: 1 January 1977 (age 49); Lerwick, Shetland, Scotland
- Education: Guildhall School of Music and Drama
- Occupation: Actor
- Years active: 1992–present
- Notable work: Being Human; Shetland; Inside I'm Dancing; Luther
- Spouse: Charlotte Allam

Steven Robertson (born 1 January 1977) is a Scottish actor who is best known for his role as Detective Sandy Wilson in the drama series Shetland. He portrayed Michael Connelly, a young man with cerebral palsy, in Inside I'm Dancing, and played Dominic Rook in the popular BBC Three comedy-drama series Being Human. He has had roles in numerous television programmes including Luther and The Bletchley Circle.

== Personal life ==
Robertson grew up in the small village of Vidlin in the Shetland Islands of Scotland, with his two sisters. In his childhood, Robertson battled and overcame severe dyslexia. Before pursuing an acting career, he worked as an odd-job man in his village. Growing up, he was close to the Shetland poet Rhoda Bulter. He stated that she was the trigger for him pursuing a career in performing by telling him old Shetland tales. Robertson attended the Guildhall School of Music and Drama. While there he met his wife, actress Charlotte Allam. He is also a member of Aya Theatre and has starred in their adaptation of George Orwell's Burmese Days as Flory. He currently lives in Hertfordshire with his wife and daughter.

== Career ==
Robertson's first major film role came in 2004 when he starred alongside fellow Scottish actor James McAvoy in Inside I'm Dancing.

He then went on to play a small part in the 2005 film Kingdom of Heaven as an Angelic Priest. Following this, he had a big role in the 2005 French war film Joyeux Noël in which he played Jonathan, a young man whose brother was shot dead during WW1. Robertson then went on to play characters in numerous TV dramas, including Luther, where he played both of the Millberry twins, a murderous duo who decided their victim's fate on the roll of a dice.

Robertson then played Dominic Rook, a government leader whose department protects the world from supernaturals in series 5 of the British supernatural drama Being Human.

He later worked on series 2 of Utopia, a British conspiracy thriller for Channel 4 where he played the role of Terrence.

=== Shetland ===
Robertson returned to Shetland to film the TV series of the same name, where he starred as Constable Sandy Wilson in the BBC One adaptation of the popular Ann Cleeves book series. The show was criticised for its lack of Shetland accents, with Robertson being the only main cast member born and brought up on the islands. However, the series attracted over 6 million viewers and a second series was commissioned featuring, alongside Douglas Henshall and Robertson, actors Brian Cox, Julie Graham and Alex Norton, with Robertson's character now a detective. Robertson stated to Digital Spy that his portrayal of Wilson was a "nice break from playing killers and creeps". A third series, telling a single story, aired in 2016.

Robertson returned as DC Wilson for the fourth series, which was broadcast in early 2018, the fifth series, broadcast in early 2019, the sixth in 2021 and the seventh in 2022.

== Filmography ==
=== Film ===
- Inside I'm Dancing (2004) (also released under the title Rory O'Shea Was Here) as Michael Connolly
- Kingdom of Heaven (2005) as the Angelic Priest
- Joyeux Noël (2005) as Jonathan
- True North (2006) as The Cook
- Elizabeth: The Golden Age (2007) as Francis Throckmorton
- Neds (2010) as Mr Bonetti
- The Tourist (2010) as Junior Technician Pinnock
- 5 Days of War (2011) as Davit Kezerashvili
- The Somnambulists (2012) as Man 12
- T2 Trainspotting (2017) as Francis Begbie's lawyer
- Tell It to the Bees (2018) as Jim

=== TV ===
- E=mc² (2005) as Michael Faraday
- He Kills Coppers (2008) as Tony Meehan
- Tess of the d'Urbervilles (2008) as Cuthbert Clare
- Shameless (2009) as Padraig Maguire, deceased father of Paddy Maguire seen in a nightmare
- Red Riding (2009) as Sergeant Bob Fraser
- Hustle (2009)
- Ashes to Ashes (2010) as Paul Thordy
- Luther (2011) as Robert/Nicholas Millberry
- Parade's End as Colonel Bill Williams, CO (2012)
- Being Human (2012-Guest, 2013-Regular) as Dominic Rook
- The Bletchley Circle (2012) as Malcolm Crowley
- Shetland (2013–present) as Detective Constable Sandy Wilson
- New Tricks (2013) as Tim Belgrade
- Utopia (2014) as Terrence
- In the Flesh (2014) as John Weston
- Doctor Who (2015) as Richard Pritchard
- Harlots (2017) as Robert Oswald
- Vera (2018) as Tom Naresby
- The Bay (2021) as Mark Bradwell

=== Stage ===
- King Lear (2002) as Kent (Royal Shakespeare Company Academy)
- The Seagull (2003) as Konstantin Gavrilovich Treplyov (Royal Exchange, Manchester)
- Antony and Cleopatra as Octavian (Royal Exchange, Manchester)
- The Tempest (2007) as Ariel (Royal Exchange, Manchester)
- Ghosts (2009) as Oswald Alving (Citizens Theatre)
