= True North (2006 film) =

- Directed by: Steve Hudson
- Written by: Steve Hudson
- Produced by: David Collins; Eddie Dick; Sonja Ewers
- Starring: Martin Compston; Peter Mullan; Gary Lewis; Steven Robertson; Angel Li
- Cinematography: Peter Robertson
- Edited by: Andrea Mertens
- Music by: Edmund Butt
- Production companies: Samson Productions; BBC Films; Bord Scannán na hÉireann/the Irish Film Board; Scottish Screen; Filmstiftung NRW
- Distributed by: Ariel Films (United Kingdom); Beyond Films (International)
- Release dates: 11 September 2006 (Canada); 18 January 2007 (Germany); 14 September 2007 (UK); 18 December 2007 (Ireland)
- Running time: 96 minutes
- Countries: United Kingdom; Germany; Ireland
- Language: English

True North is a 2006 British drama film directed by Steve Hudson and starring Martin Compston, Peter Mullan, Gary Lewis and Steven Robertson as sailors aboard a Scottish fishing boat smuggling illegal immigrants from China into the United Kingdom.

The film premiered at the Toronto International Film Festival in Canada on 11 September 2006 and was also shown at the Max Ophüls Festival in Germany, the Karlovy Vary Film Festival in the Czech Republic, the Copenhagen International Film Festival in Denmark and the Ourense International Film Festival in Spain.

There is a 2014 Korean film, Haemoo, with the same story which is attributed to a 2007 stage play by the same name. An animated film of the same name concerning North Korean prisoners was released on 1 October 2020.

== Plot ==
The film begins showing a group of farmers from China's Fujian province speaking to a Snakehead (a smuggler of people), telling him the false stories they will use for sympathy in the West.

The Providence, a Scottish fishing trawler from Peterhead, lands at the docks in Ostend, Belgium where all of the crew but the Skipper (Lewis) debark. His son, Seán (Compston), the ship's crewman, Riley (Mullan), and the cook (Robertson) then go to an all-night café before splitting up; Seán phones and goes to meet a contact, Riley visits a local brothel and the cook remains at the café. Seán meets his contact, a local man named Pol (Hark Bohm), in a dockside warehouse in the hope of being paid to smuggle cigarettes tax-free. Pol has no cigarettes, however, and instead offers Seán a large sum of money to smuggle a group of Chinese immigrants into the United Kingdom. Seán reluctantly agrees as he and his father are heavily indebted after failing to catch enough fish to pay the mortgage. Riley returns to find the refugees aboard the ship, but he and Seán agree not to inform the Skipper or the cook.

The Chinese are kept below deck in poor conditions but one, a 12-year-old girl named Su Li (Angel Li), sneaks off and lives in another part of the boat. She begins to steal food from the kitchen but the slow-witted cook eventually notices that some of his food is missing. Seán insists they can't go home without a good catch as an empty boat would look suspicious and the cargo hold may be searched and the Chinese stowaways discovered. The nets come up near empty almost every time, though, and the conditions in the hold are beginning to deteriorate rapidly. When one of the Chinese stowaways dies, Riley goes to the Skipper and confesses all. The Skipper confronts Seán but soon realises that he was simply doing what was in the ship's, and their, best interests. For the first time, the Skipper is forced to acknowledge that he's only making a loss by staying at sea. Broken, he gives the wheel to Seán, who turns for home.

Meanwhile, the cook discovers Su Li and comforts her, but does not inform anyone else of her presence on board the ship. The Skipper believes that if they return to Scotland, they will face certain arrest; he will lose his license, and the bank will foreclose on the boat. He drowns the immigrants without telling anyone. Seán and Riley then see the nets are full and pull them up. The crew is horrified to find the corpses. The cook attacks the Skipper with a chain and kills him, as he would have no choice but to kill Su Li also.

The film then ends with Riley and Su Li sitting at a bus stop in Peterhead, Scotland. Su Li gets on a coach and it drives away. Inside her bag is the large sum of money from the ship.

== Cast ==
- Peter Mullan as Riley
- Martin Compston as Seán
- Gary Lewis as The Skipper
- Steven Robertson as The Cook
- Angel Li as Su Li
- Hark Bohm as Pol
- Pat Kiernan as Henri
- Shi Ming as The Snakehead
