= Mo Mowlam =

British politician (1949–2005)

The Right Honourable Mo Mowlam
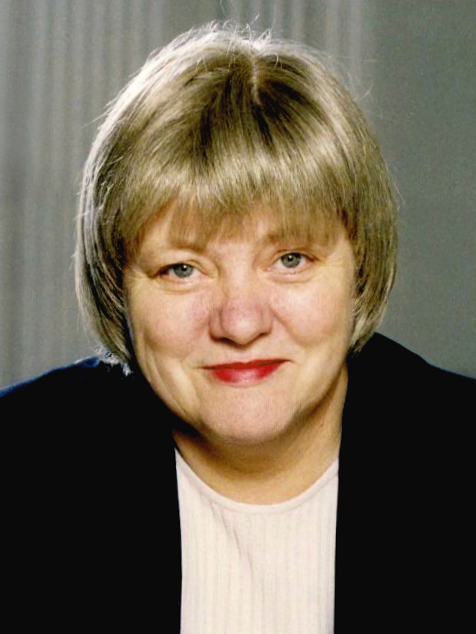
- Official portrait, c. 1997–98

Minister for the Cabinet Office Chancellor of the Duchy of Lancaster
- In office 11 October 1999 – 11 June 2001
- Prime Minister: Tony Blair
- Preceded by: Jack Cunningham
- Succeeded by: The Lord MacDonald of Tradeston

Secretary of State for Northern Ireland
- In office 3 May 1997 – 11 October 1999
- Prime Minister: Tony Blair
- Preceded by: Patrick Mayhew
- Succeeded by: Peter Mandelson

Member of Parliament for Redcar
- In office 11 June 1987 – 14 May 2001
- Preceded by: James Tinn
- Succeeded by: Vera Baird

Shadow cabinet portfolios
- 1992: Chancellor of the Duchy of Lancaster
- 1992–1993: Women and Equalities
- 1992–1994: National Heritage
- 1994–1997: Northern Ireland

Personal details
- Born: Marjorie Mowlam; 18 September 1949 Watford, England
- Died: 19 August 2005 (aged 55) Canterbury, England
- Party: Labour
- Spouse: Jon Norton (m. 1995)
- Education: Trevelyan College, Durham (BA); University of Iowa (PhD)

Marjorie "Mo" Mowlam (18 September 1949 – 19 August 2005) was a British Labour Party politician. She was the Member of Parliament (MP) for Redcar from 1987 to 2001 and served in the Cabinet of Tony Blair as Secretary of State for Northern Ireland, Minister for the Cabinet Office and Chancellor of the Duchy of Lancaster.

In 1998, during Mowlam's term as Northern Ireland Secretary, the historic Good Friday Agreement was signed. Her personal charisma and reputation for plain speaking made her one of the most popular "New Labour" politicians in the UK.

== Early life ==
Marjorie Mowlam was born on 18 September 1949 in Watford, Hertfordshire, England, the middle of three children of Frank William Mowlam, a Post Office worker, and Bettina Mary "Tina" Mowlam (née Rogers), a telephonist. She grew up in Coventry, where her father was assistant postmaster. She was awarded the Freedom of the City of Coventry in 1999.

Mowlam was the only one in her family to pass the 11-plus exam. She attended Chiswick Girls' grammar school in West London, then moved to Coundon Court School in Coventry, one of the first comprehensive schools in the country. While at school, Mowlam was elected head girl, became a supporter of the Labour Party, attended protests against the South African apartheid system and was an activist with the Campaign for Nuclear Disarmament (CND).

After graduation from high school, Mowlam attended Trevelyan College, Durham University, reading sociology and anthropology. She joined the Labour Party in her first year at university. She became the Secretary of the Durham Union Society in 1969 and later vice-president of Durham Students' Union. After leaving Durham, Mowlam worked for then-MP (Labour) Tony Benn in London, and for American writer Alvin Toffler in New York, moving to the United States with her then-boyfriend and studying for a PhD degree in political science at the University of Iowa, with her doctoral research on the effects of the Swiss system of referendums.

Mowlam worked as a lecturer in the Political Science Department at the University of Wisconsin–Milwaukee in 1977 and at Florida State University in Tallahassee from 1977 to 1979. During her time in Tallahassee, her apartment was broken into. She suspected it was Ted Bundy, a serial killer and rapist who murdered at least thirty-five young women.

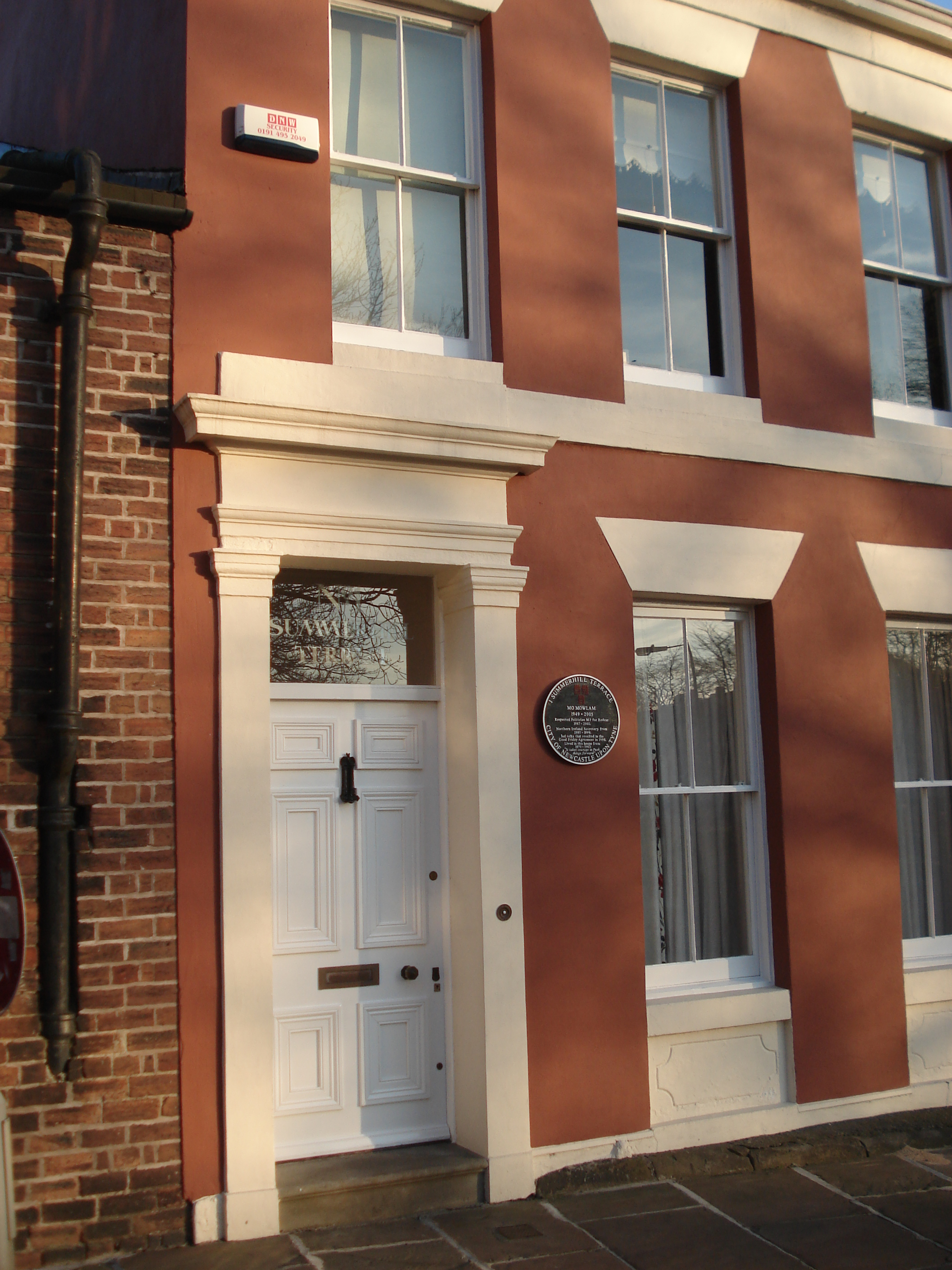
Mowlam's house in Summerhill Terrace, Newcastle upon Tyne, with plaque

Mowlam returned to England in 1979 to take up an appointment at the University of Newcastle upon Tyne. She also worked in adult education at Northern College, Barnsley, with underprivileged students. In 1981, she organised a series of alternative lectures to the Reith lectures given that year by Laurence Martin, the university's vice chancellor. These were published as Debate on Disarmament, with their proceeds going to the Campaign for Nuclear Disarmament.

== Personal life ==
Mowlam married Jonathan Norton, a Labour-supporting City of London banker, in County Durham on 24 June 1995; Norton died on 3 February 2009. Mowlam had two step-children from Norton's first marriage to Geraldine Bedell.

== Member of Parliament ==
Having failed to win selection for the 1983 general election, Mowlam worked as treasurer on Neil Kinnock's Labour leadership campaign. Mowlam was selected as Labour candidate for the safe seat of Redcar after James Tinn stood down. She took the seat in the 1987 general election, making her maiden speech in Parliament on 7 July 1987.

Mowlam became the Labour spokesperson on Northern Ireland later in 1987. Together with Shadow Chancellor John Smith, Mowlam was one of the architects of Labour's "Prawn Cocktail Offensive" dedicated to reassuring the UK's financial sector about Labour's financial rectitude.

Mowlam joined the Shadow cabinet when John Smith was elected leader of the Labour Party in 1992, holding the title of Shadow Secretary of State for National Heritage. During this time, she antagonised both monarchists and republicans by calling for Buckingham Palace to be demolished and replaced by a "modern" palace built at public expense. Later, her willingness to speak her mind, often without regard to the consequences, was seen as her greatest strength by her supporters.

Following Smith's death in 1994, Mowlam, alongside Peter Kilfoyle, became a principal organiser of Tony Blair's campaign for the Labour leadership. After his victory, Blair appointed her as Shadow Secretary of State for Northern Ireland. She initially resisted being appointed to the position, preferring an economic portfolio, but, after accepting it, she threw her weight into the job.

=== In government ===
In 1997, Mowlam was once again re-elected as MP for Redcar with an increased majority of 21,667. With the Labour Party general election win in May 1997, she was appointed Secretary of State for Northern Ireland. She was the first woman to hold the post, succeeding Patrick Mayhew of the Conservative Party. A reflection of Mowlam's personal approach was the organisation of a walk about in Belfast city centre. She said that "it's the real life of people that needs changing."

=== Good Friday Agreement ===
[Mo Mowlam] was the catalyst that allowed politics to move forward which led to the signing of the Good Friday Agreement in April 1998. She cut through conventions and made difficult decisions that gave momentum to political progress.

— Peter Hain, 2005

Mowlam "oversaw the negotiations which led to the 1998 Good Friday Agreement" with her "approachability," "informal touch" and "personal interventions" helping to make the agreement possible. On 6 August 1997, she met with the Sinn Féin (SF) leader Gerry Adams to have "their first face to face discussions since the breakdown of the Provisional Irish Republican Army (IRA) ceasefire in February 1996. She was successful in helping to restore the second IRA ceasefire, which eventually led to Sinn Féin being included in the multi-party peace talks. The talks led to the Good Friday/Belfast Agreement achieved on 10 April 1998, bringing an end to conflict in Northern Ireland known as The Troubles.

On 4 January the Ulster Loyalist UDA/UFF prisoners in the Maze prison voted not to continue supporting the peace process. Led by Gary McMichael of the Ulster Democratic Party, their political representatives quickly flew to London requesting the Secretary of State meet with the prisoners. After consulting with her advisers and the UK Prime Minister Tony Blair on Friday 9 January 1998 she visited the Ulster Defence Association (UDA) and Ulster Freedom Fighters (UFF) prisoners represented politically by Gary McMichael. The visit was unprecedented for a Secretary of State for Northern Ireland. "The Maze was a focal point of a troubled peace process today as Mo Mowlam arrived for a visit that had been variously described as mad or brave." The same day she also visited the Irish Republican Army (IRA) and Ulster Volunteer Force (UVF) H-block wings of the prison.

The message that I brought was very clear and simple. The only way that we're going to make progress towards a permanent peace in Northern Ireland is by taking a proactive stance and talking to reach the broadest possible agreement.

— Mo Mowlam

The visit was unprecedented and a political gamble, and was potentially dangerous when she met with prisoners, some of whom had been convicted of murder, face-to-face.

Mowlam went on to oversee the Good Friday Agreement signing in 1998, which led to the temporary establishment of a devolved power-sharing Northern Ireland Assembly (also known as Stormont) and an agreement by the Republic of Ireland to rewrite two articles in their constitution about Irish unity.

For her role in the Northern Ireland peace process, Mowlam was given a standing ovation at the 1998 Labour Party Conference. However, an increasingly difficult relationship with Unionist parties meant her role in the talks was ultimately taken over by Tony Blair and his staff, prompting Mowlam to remark to then-US President Bill Clinton: "Didn't you know? I'm the new tea lady around here". In 1999, Mowlam referred to paramilitary punishment attacks in Northern Ireland as "internal housekeeping" and maintained that the violence did not count as breaking the ceasefire.

=== Cabinet Office Minister ===
Whilst Mowlam's deteriorating relationship with Unionists was the key reason Mowlam was replaced by Peter Mandelson as Northern Ireland Secretary in October 1999, her move to Cabinet Office Minister may have involved other factors. Rumours about her health also circulated in the media, who reported that Mowlam had not fully recovered from treatment for a benign tumour. Mowlam resented being appointed to the Cabinet Office post, having previously disparaged it as "Minister for the Today programme". As Cabinet Office Minister, she was reportedly intended to be Tony Blair's "enforcer".

As head of the Government's anti-drugs campaign, in 2002, Mowlam called for international legalisation of drugs. She caused some controversy when she admitted in 2000 to having used cannabis as a student: "I tried dope. I didn't particularly like it. But unlike President Clinton, I did inhale".

=== Retirement ===
On 4 September 2000, Mowlam announced her intention to retire from Parliament and relinquished her seat in Redcar at the 2001 general election. Following retirement from the House of Commons, she became a critic of government policy on various issues, especially the 2003 invasion of Iraq. She took part in the anti-Iraq War protests alongside Vanessa Redgrave, Tony Benn, Tariq Ali, Ken Livingstone and Bianca Jagger.

Following her retirement, Mowlam became agony aunt for the men's magazine Zoo. She said she missed her constituency work as an MP. She also set up a charity, MoMo Helps, to help drug users who are successfully completing their rehabilitation and provide support for the parents or carers of disabled children.

A biography of Mowlam by journalist and writer Julia Langdon, titled Mo Mowlam: The Biography, was published in 2000. Her political memoirs, titled Momentum: The Struggle for Peace, Politics and the People, were published in 2002.

She was the subject of This Is Your Life in January 2003 when she was surprised by Michael Aspel.

In 2004, Mowlam was approached to take part in the first series of Strictly Come Dancing but was unable to take part due to ill health.

== Illness and death ==
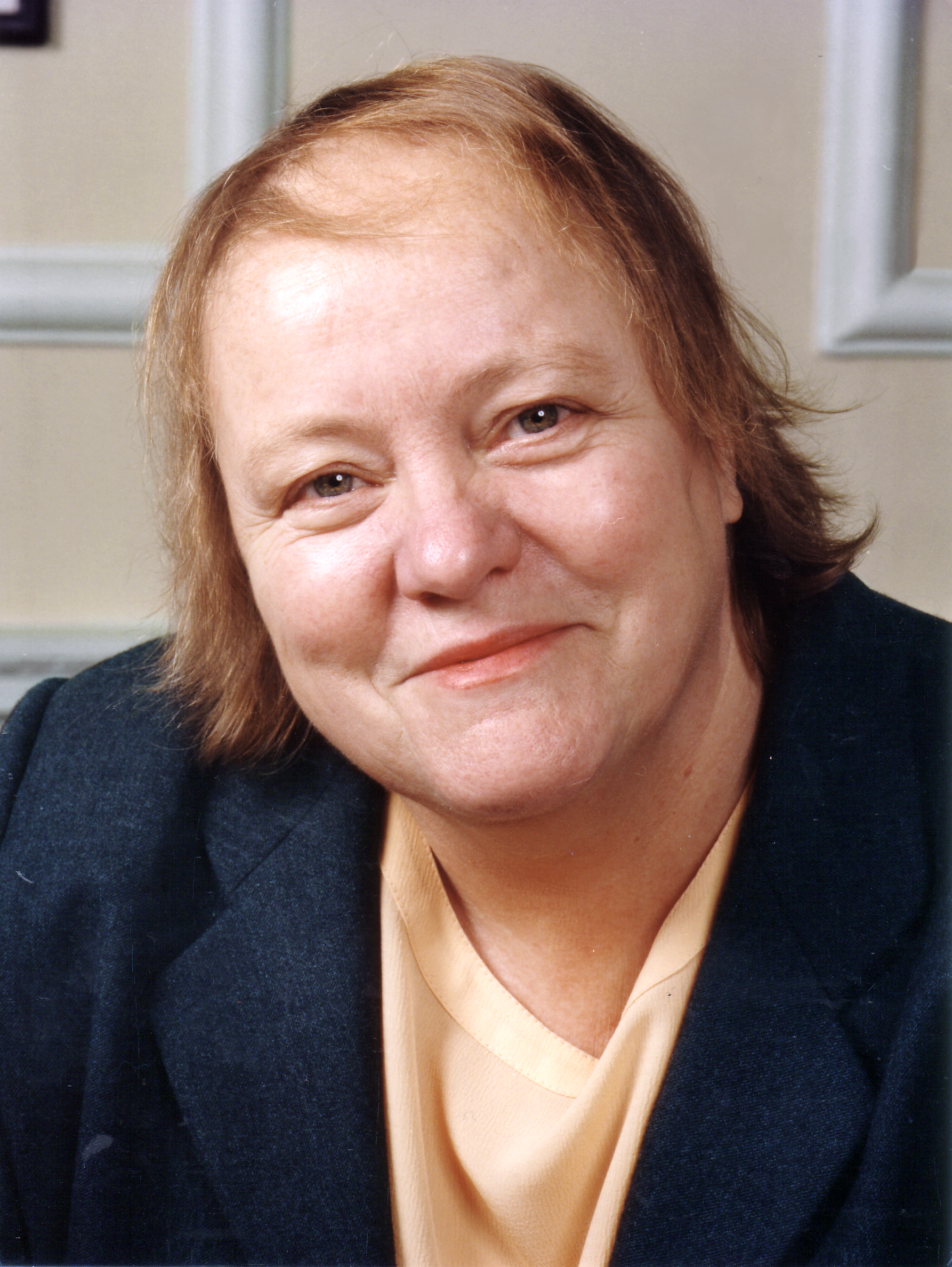
Mowlam in 1999

Five months before the 1997 general election which took Labour to office, Mowlam was diagnosed with a brain tumour, which she tried to keep private until the tabloid press started to print jibes about her appearance. Although she claimed to have made a full recovery, the various treatments caused her to lose most of her hair. She often wore a wig, which she would sometimes casually remove in public stating that it was "such a bother".

On 3 August 2005, the BBC reported that she was critically ill at King's College Hospital in London. She appeared to have suffered from balance problems as a result of her radiotherapy. According to her husband, she had fallen over on 30 July 2005, receiving head injuries and never regaining consciousness. Her living will, in which she had asked not to be resuscitated, was honoured.

On 12 August 2005, Mowlam was moved to Pilgrims Hospice in Canterbury, Kent, where she died at 8:10 am on 19 August, aged 55. She was survived by her husband Jon Norton and two stepchildren.

In January 2010, it was revealed by her ex-doctor Mark Glaser that her tumour had been malignant and was the cause of her death. Despite recommendations, she had withheld the true nature of her condition from Tony Blair and the electorate.

Mowlam was an atheist and was cremated in Sittingbourne on 1 September 2005 at a non-religious service conducted by Richard Coles, formerly of the 1980s band The Communards. Half of her ashes were scattered at Hillsborough Castle (the Secretary of State for Northern Ireland's official residence) and the other half in her former parliamentary constituency of Redcar.

== Memorials and tributes ==
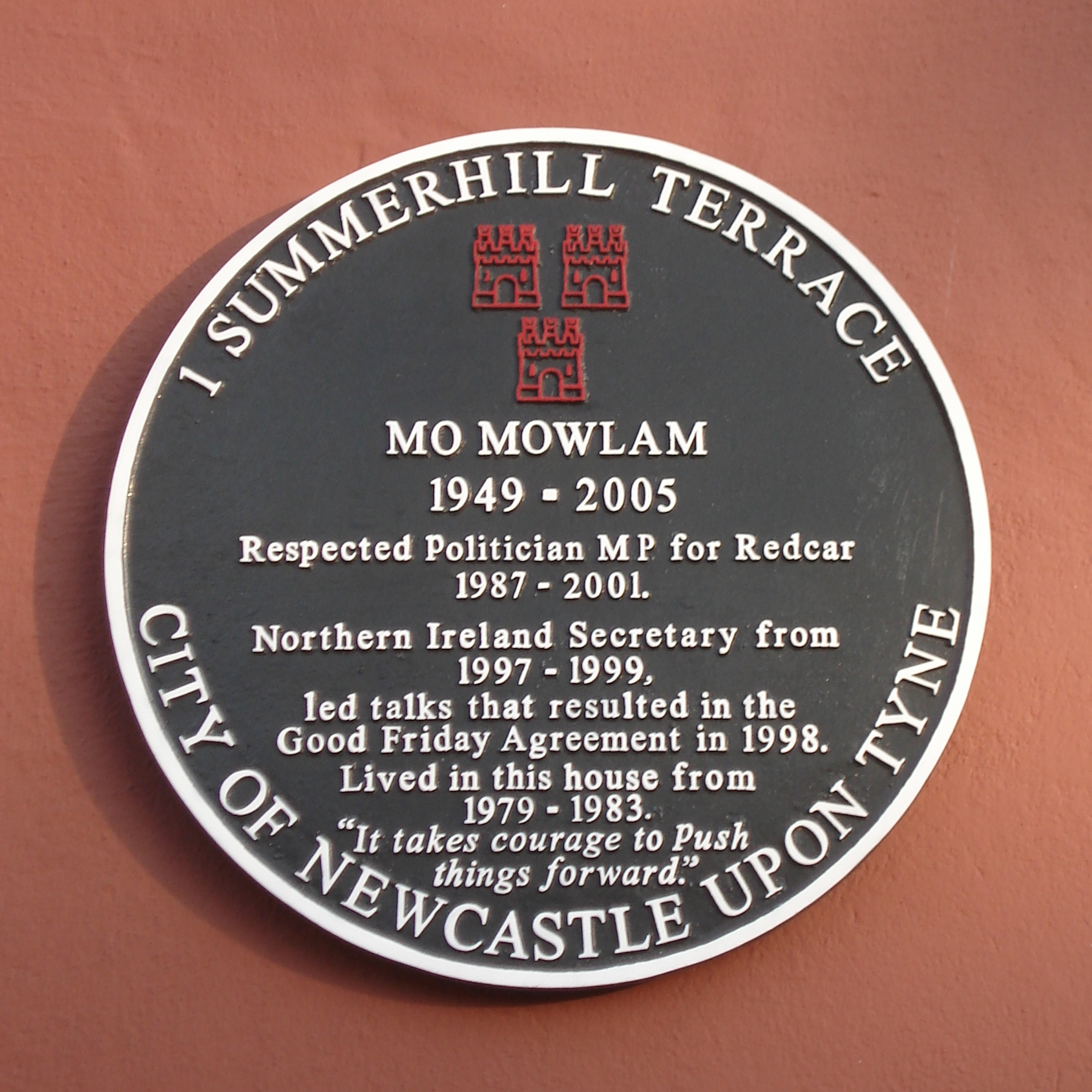
The plaque on her home

A memorial service was held for Mowlam at the Theatre Royal, Drury Lane, on 20 November 2005, another at Hillsborough Castle on 1 December 2005 and another in Redcar on 3 December 2005.

To honour Mowlam, Redcar and Cleveland Unitary Authority commissioned an official memorial mosaic which was unveiled at Redcar's newly refurbished boating lake on 23 October 2009. An intricate 800-tile mosaic, set in a three-metre raised circle, was created by local artist John Todd to illustrate her life and interests. The mosaic has her portrait as the centrepiece, surrounded by images including the beach where she loved to walk, racehorses at Redcar Racecourse (where she celebrated her wedding), the Redcar steelworks, the Zetland Lifeboat, clasped hands and doves (to symbolise the Northern Ireland peace process) and the Houses of Parliament.

Mowlam's archive of personal papers, which was donated in 2006, is held by Teesside Archives.

The postgraduate common room of Trevelyan College, Durham (Mowlam's alma mater) was renamed "The Mowlam Room" in her honour. The room houses a small bust of Mowlam.

A children's play park named after Mowlam is on the Stormont Estate in Belfast.

A blue plaque commemorating Mowlam, commissioned by the Coventry Society, was unveiled at Coundon Court School in Coventry, in September 2025.

A second blue plaque commemorating Mowlam was unveiled at her alma mater, Trevelyan College, Durham University, on 17 June 2026.

== Docudrama ==
In 2009, Channel 4 commissioned a docudramatic film, Mo, portraying Mo Mowlam's life from the Labour election victory of 1997 to her death in 2005. The film starred Julie Walters as Mowlam. Mo was broadcast on 31 January 2010 and attracted over 3.5million viewers, making it Channel 4's highest-rated drama since 2001. The film was also a critical success, with MP Adam Ingram claiming that it "brought home the essence of Mo". Mo was nominated for a BAFTA award for Best Single Drama with Julie Walters and Gary Lewis receiving nominations for, respectively, Best Actress and Best Supporting Actor. The Best Actress award was given to Walters.

Parliament of the United Kingdom
Preceded by James Tinn	Member of Parliament for Redcar; 1987–2001	Succeeded by Vera Baird
Political offices
Preceded by Paul Murphy	Shadow Secretary of State for Northern Ireland; 1995–1997	Succeeded by Andrew MacKay
Preceded by Patrick Mayhew	Secretary of State for Northern Ireland; 1997–1999	Succeeded by Peter Mandelson
Preceded by Jack Cunningham	Minister for the Cabinet Office; 1999–2001	Succeeded by The Lord Macdonald of Tradeston
Preceded by Jack Cunningham	Chancellor of the Duchy of Lancaster; 1999–2001	Succeeded by The Lord Macdonald of Tradeston
