= Reg McKay =

Scottish social worker and author

Reginald David McKay (15 July 1953 - 19 October 2009), who published as Reg McKay, was a Scottish social worker, columnist and author. After working for twenty years as a social worker in Glasgow, he authored bestselling crime novels and books on true crime. After a terminal cancer diagnosis in 2009 he started a Daily Record column, the Cancer Diaries, in which he wrote about the cancer's effects on his life.

== Early life ==
Reginald David McKay was born on 15 July, 1953 in Keith, Moray, which was then a part of Banffshire. He attended Keith Grammar School but dropped out at the age of thirteen and, according to himself, began to lead a delinquent lifestyle. The family moved to Govan after McKay's father obtained a job in Glasgow, where McKay attended Govan High School, where he was bullied and, on two incidents, slashed for his north-eastern roots. He was admitted to Glasgow University, where he received a master's degree in psychology.

== Career ==
=== Social work ===
After graduating from Glasgow University McKay moved to Edinburgh, where he developed an interest in the plight of homeless people. He returned to Glasgow to engage in social work in aid of the homeless, mostly in Glasgow. The Argyll and Bute Council in Lochgilphead eventually appointed him director of social services. He was also director of the Scottish chapter of National Children's Home, a charity for children in the United Kingdom now known as Action for Children.

In 1982, McKay wrote a court report for Paul Ferris, an eighteen-year-old detainee at Longriggend Young Offenders' Institute who had stabbed another inmate. In 1998, Ferris was caught selling Uzi submachine guns in Durham and jailed. McKay, who encouraged Ferris to tell his story, proceeded to co-author The Ferris Conspiracy (2001) with him; it sold well in Scotland.

=== Crime writing ===
Aside from The Ferris Conspiracy, McKay co-wrote with Paul Ferris the novels Deadly Divisions, Villains and Vendetta. McKay, independently, wrote Murder Capital - Life and Death on the Streets of Glasgow and The Last Godfather. With Glenn Lucas he co-wrote Murdered or Missing? The Arlene Fraser Case. His books sold well and reportedly were the most commonly stolen from Borders.

== Personal life ==
In 1990 McKay married a woman from Glasgow named Gerry. They remained together until his death.

=== Illness and death ===
McKay was diagnosed, at the Royal Alexandria Hospital in Paisley, with two cancerous tumours, one in his brain and the other in his lung, in January 2009. In March he started a weekly column called the Cancer Diaries for the Daily Record, which detailed his daily life with cancer. As his health deteriorated Gerry, who had survived breast cancer, would transcribe McKay's dictations to her. He died on 19 October, 2009 at his home in Paisley, Renfrewshire. In 2010 McKay was posthumously deemed the Scottish Press Awards' Columnist of the Year for his Cancer Diaries.
