= 2010 British Academy Television Awards =

UK television awards ceremony

- Date: 6 June 2010
- Site: London Palladium
- Hosted by: Graham Norton

Highlights
- Best Comedy Series: The Armstrong and Miller Show
- Best Drama: Misfits
- Best Actor: Kenneth Branagh; Wallander
- Best Actress: Julie Walters; Mo
- Best Comedy Performance: Peter Capaldi The Thick of It; Rebecca Front The Thick of It

Television coverage
- Channel: BBC One
- Ratings: 4.17 million

The 2010 British Academy Television Awards were held on 6 June 2010. The nominations were announced on 10 May. This year new awards were added including the award for Best Actor/Actress in a Supporting Role. Graham Norton hosted the ceremony. Winners are in bold.

== Nominations ==
- **Best Actor**
  - **Kenneth Branagh** – **Wallander** (BBC One)
  - Brendan Gleeson – Into the Storm (BBC Two)
  - John Hurt – An Englishman in New York (ITV)
  - David Oyelowo – Small Island (BBC One)
- **Best Actress**
  - Helena Bonham Carter – Enid (BBC Four)
  - Sophie Okonedo – Mrs Mandela (BBC Four)
  - Julie Walters – A Short Stay in Switzerland (BBC One)
  - **Julie Walters** – **Mo** (Channel 4)
- **Best Supporting Actor**
  - Benedict Cumberbatch – Small Island (BBC One)
  - Tom Hollander – Gracie! (BBC Four)
  - Gary Lewis – Mo (Channel 4)
  - **Matthew Macfadyen** – **Criminal Justice** (BBC One)
- **Best Supporting Actress**
  - **Rebecca Hall** – **Red Riding 1974** (Channel 4)
  - Sophie Okonedo – Criminal Justice (BBC One)
  - Lauren Socha – The Unloved (Channel 4)
  - Imelda Staunton – Cranford (BBC One)
- **Best Entertainment Performance**
  - Stephen Fry – QI (BBC One)
  - Harry Hill – Harry Hill's TV Burp (ITV)
  - **Anthony McPartlin & Declan Donnelly** – **I'm a Celebrity...Get Me Out of Here!** (ITV)
  - Michael McIntyre – Michael McIntyre's Comedy Roadshow (BBC One)
- **Best Female Performance in a Comedy Role**
  - Jo Brand – Getting On (BBC Four)
  - **Rebecca Front** – **The Thick of It** (BBC Two)
  - Miranda Hart – Miranda (BBC Two)
  - Joanna Scanlan – Getting On (BBC Four)
- **Best Male Performance in a Comedy Role**
  - Simon Bird – The Inbetweeners (E4)
  - **Peter Capaldi** – **The Thick of It** (BBC Two)
  - Hugh Dennis – Outnumbered Christmas Special (BBC One)
  - David Mitchell – Peep Show (Channel 4)
- **Best Single Drama**
  - A Short Stay in Switzerland (BBC One)
  - Five Minutes of Heaven (BBC Two)
  - Mo (Channel 4)
  - **The Unloved** (Channel 4)
- **Best Drama Series**
  - Being Human (BBC Three)
  - **Misfits** (E4)
  - Spooks (BBC One)
  - The Street (BBC One)
- **Best Drama Serial**
  - **Occupation** (BBC One)
  - Red Riding (Channel 4)
  - Small Island (BBC One)
  - Unforgiven (ITV)
- **Best Continuing Drama**
  - The Bill (ITV)
  - Casualty (BBC One)
  - Coronation Street (ITV)
  - **EastEnders** (BBC One)
- **Best International Programme**
  - Family Guy (BBC Three)
  - **Mad Men** (BBC Four)
  - Nurse Jackie (BBC Two)
  - True Blood (FX)
- **Best Factual Series**
  - Blood, Sweat and Takeaways (BBC Three)
  - The Family (Channel 4)
  - **One Born Every Minute** (Channel 4)
  - Who Do You Think You Are? (BBC One)
- **Best Specialist Factual**
  - Art of Russia (BBC Four)
  - Chemistry: A Volatile History (BBC Four)
  - **Inside Nature's Giants** (Channel 4)
  - Yellowstone (BBC Two)
- **Best Single Documentary**
  - Katie: My Beautiful Face (Channel 4)
  - Louis Theroux: A Place for Paedophiles (BBC Two)
  - Tsunami: Caught on Camera (Channel 4)
  - **Wounded** (BBC One)
- **Best Feature**
  - The Choir: Unsung Town (BBC Two)
  - Heston's Feasts (Channel 4)
  - James May's Toy Stories (BBC Two)
  - **Masterchef: The Professionals** (BBC Two)
- **Best Current Affairs**
  - Dispatches – Afghanistan: Behind Enemy Lines (Channel 4)
  - Generation Jihad (BBC Two)
  - This World – Gypsy Child Thieves (BBC Two)
  - **Dispatches – Terror in Mumbai** (Channel 4)
- **Best News Coverage**
  - The Haiti Earthquake (BBC News Channel)
  - Haiti Earthquake (Channel 4 News)
  - **Haiti** (ITV News at Ten)
  - Pakistan: Terror's Frontline (Sky News)
- **Best Sport**
  - F1 – The Brazilian Grand Prix (BBC One/BBC Sport)
  - 2009 FA Cup Final (ITV/ITV Sport)
  - **World Athletics Championships** (BBC Two/BBC Sport)
  - UEFA Champions League Live (ITV/ITV Sport)
- **New Media**
  - Antony Gormley's One & Other
  - Life Begins (One Born Every Minute)
  - Primeval Evolved
  - **The Virtual Revolution**
- **Best Entertainment Programme**
  - **Britain's Got Talent** (ITV)
  - The Graham Norton Show (BBC One)
  - Harry Hill's TV Burp (ITV)
  - Newswipe with Charlie Brooker (BBC Four)
- **Best Comedy Programme**
  - **The Armstrong and Miller Show** (BBC One)
  - The Kevin Bishop Show (Channel 4)
  - Stewart Lee's Comedy Vehicle (BBC Two)
  - That Mitchell and Webb Look (BBC Two)
- **Best Situation Comedy**
  - The Inbetweeners (E4)
  - Miranda (BBC Two)
  - Peep Show (Channel Four)
  - **The Thick of It** (BBC Two)
- **YouTube Audience Award**
  - Britain's Got Talent (ITV)
  - Glee (E4)
  - **The Inbetweeners** (E4)
  - The One Show (BBC One)
  - The X Factor (ITV)
  - Unforgiven (ITV)
- **Special Award**
  - **Simon Cowell**
- **BAFTA Fellowship**
  - **Melvyn Bragg**
