= Mo (2010 film) =

Film about British Labour Party politician Mo Mowlam

Mo is a 2010 TV film about the later life and career of the British Labour Party politician Mo Mowlam, written by Neil McKay and directed by Philip Martin.

== Synopsis ==
Mo stars Julie Walters as Mo Mowlam, the controversial but popular Secretary of State for Northern Ireland.

Early advertisements for the film showed a scene in which Mowlam removes her wig during a meeting with Gerry Adams and Martin McGuinness. It was first shown on UK television on Channel 4 on 31 January 2010.

== Cast ==
Person portrayed	Actor
Mo Mowlam	Julie Walters
Jon Norton (Mowlam's husband)	David Haig
Henrietta Norton (Mowlam's stepdaughter)	Lucy Boynton
Peter Kilfoyle	Tony Maudsley
Adam Ingram	Gary Lewis
Peter Mandelson	Steven Mackintosh
David Trimble	Adrian Dunbar
Bill Clinton	Kerry Shale
Gerry Adams	John Lynch
Martin McGuinness	Eoin McCarthy
Senator George Mitchell	Harry Ditson
Johnny Adair	Marc O'Shea
Kevin	Gary Henry
Michael Stone	Ian Beattie

== Reception ==
The programme attracted over 3.5 million viewers on its first broadcast, making it Channel 4's highest rating drama since 2001. The biopic was also a critical success, with Mowlam's former ministerial colleague, Adam Ingram MP, depicted in the drama by Gary Lewis claiming that it "brought home the essence of Mo".

== Awards and nominations ==
The biopic was nominated for Best Single Drama at the 2010 British Academy Television Awards with Julie Walters winning for Best Actress and Gary Lewis being nominated for Best Supporting Actor. At the Royal Television Society Programme Awards, the film was nominated for Best Single Drama while Neil McKay was nominated for Best Writing: Drama and Walters was nominated for Best Actor: Female.

It was nominated for a Magnolia Award for Best Television Film or Miniseries at the 16th Shanghai Television Festival in China.
