= Nick Perry (writer) =

British playwright and screenwriter

Nick Perry is a British playwright and screenwriter. He is a graduate of the University of Hull and the National Film and Television School. His first play Arrivederci Millwall was produced by The Combination at The Albany Empire, Deptford in 1985 and jointly won the Samuel Beckett Award. Smallholdings was first performed at the King's Head Theatre in 1986 and The Vinegar Fly at the Soho Poly in 1988. Near Cricket St Thomas, 1919 was directed by Alan Ayckbourn at the Stephen Joseph Theatre, Scarborough in 1997. An Illustrated Talk was performed at the New Theatre, Sydney as part of the 2008 Short and Sweet festival.

Perry's first radio play The Loop was broadcast on BBC Radio 4 in November 2009 and won a Sony Radio Academy bronze award. Andrew Scott was named Best Supporting Actor at the inaugural BBC Audio Drama awards in 2012 for his performance in Perry's radio play, Referee. In 2022, London Particular was shortlisted for the Best Original Series or Serial award.

== Filmography ==
- Arrivederci Millwall (1990)
- Tube Tales (1999)
  - segment "Steal Away"
- The Escapist (2002)

== Plays ==
- Mamma (1982)
- Kind (1983)
- Arrivederci Millwall (1985)
- Smallholdings (1986)
- The Vinegar Fly (1988)
- Near Cricket St Thomas, 1919 (1997)
- An Illustrated Talk (2008)
- Moll Flanders (2018)

== Television ==
- Rockliffe's Babies (2 episodes)
- Tales of Sherwood Forest (1989)
- Clubland (1991)
- Horizon (1992)
  - "Hitler's Bomb" episode
- Nuclear Secrets (2007)
  - "Superbomb" episode

== Radio ==
- The Loop (2009)
- Planet B (2011)
  - episode "Doing Time"
- Referee (2011)
- Jack's Return Home (2012)
- London Bridge (2013)
- He Died With His Eyes Open (2013)
- November Dead List - series one (2014)
- The Shootist (2014)
- The Transfer (2015)
- November Dead List - series two (2016)
- Moll Flanders (2016)
- The Confidential Agent (2016)
- Death At The Airport: The Plot Against Kim Jong-nam (with Paul French, 2017)
- The Battle of San Pietro (2019)
- Journey Into Fear (2019)
- Epitaph For A Spy (2019)
- Babelsberg Babylon (2020)
- London Particular - series 1 (2020)
- Fake Psychic (with Vicky Baker, 2022)
- Exit Game (with Alex Millar, 2022)
- London Particular - series 2 (2023)
- Stormy Applause (2025)
