= Tam McGraw =

Scottish gangster

Thomas McGraw (19 February 1952 – 30 July 2007), also known as "The Licensee" or "Wan-Baw McGraw", was a Scottish gangster involved in organised crime including extortion and drug trafficking in Glasgow.

Once one of the wealthiest businessmen in Glasgow, he owned numerous businesses including security companies and taxi firms as well as properties throughout Scotland and Ireland with an estimated worth of £10 million. His drug trafficking activities were worth an estimated £14 million.

== Early life ==
Thomas McGraw was born in Lennoxtown, Stirlingshire, to the north of Glasgow. In his early life, he would spell his name "Thomas McGrow". At an early age he became involved in criminal activity, including shoplifting and burglary during the early 1960s. Although in and out of approved schools and Borstals during his teenage years, he was involved in setting up the small Bar-L team, based around the Barlanark area of Glasgow and specialising in armed robbery.

He participated in the gang's post office raids throughout Scotland, eventually becoming one of the most wanted criminals in the country. He and the others managed to evade police for some time before eventual arrest in a failed robbery of a social club outside Glasgow, as he loaded several crates of alcohol into his van. McGraw had evaded police during a brief high speed chase before his vehicle overturned, but was arrested while trying to flee on foot. However, given the circumstance of his arrest, there was speculation that McGraw may have been a police informant for the Serious Crime Squad, supplying information on associates in exchange for police protection from his own illegal activities. The charges were dropped and he was released the morning after his arrest. Similarly, he was tried and acquitted for the attempted murder of a police officer in 1978.

== Entry into organised crime ==
During the early 1980s, he began expanding his criminal operations becoming involved in narcotics such as heroin as he began purchasing nightclubs and pubs. Paul Ferris, another rival Glasgow organised crime figure, claimed in his autobiography The Ferris Conspiracy that McGraw became involved in dealing heroin due to his connections to corrupt police officers.

Also identified as a figure involved in the Glasgow Ice Cream Wars in 1984, McGraw was attempting to expand his own ice-cream van business and had been known to use violence and intimidation to secure the most lucrative rounds for himself.

== Later life ==
In 1998, he was arrested for drug smuggling. While several of his associates were convicted, McGraw was once again acquitted.

In 2002, he was attacked by unidentified assailants less than a mile from his East End home and stabbed several times, suffering wounds to his arms, wrists and buttocks. Protected by a bulletproof vest, he received only minor injuries.

During this time, with imported bodyguards from Ireland as well as surveillance by the Serious Crime Squad, McGraw was one of the most heavily protected criminals in the city. He later reportedly brokered a deal with Ferris, with whom he had been feuding for some time over allegations in the latter's first book. It was also reported that McGraw paid Ferris £1.5 to £2 million to keep the peace and make sure Paul Ferris didn't take revenge on him. In the last few years after Ferris was freed from prison, McGraw was said to be spending more time in his villa abroad, with a few of his henchmen.

== Death ==
Tam McGraw died of a suspected heart attack at his home in Mount Vernon, Glasgow at the age of 55. Paramedics and doctors arrived at his home at about 1500 BST on Monday 30 July 2007 but were unable to resuscitate him. He was declared dead on arrival at Glasgow Royal Infirmary.

== In popular culture ==
Tam McGraw is portrayed by John Hannah in the 2013 film The Wee Man.
