= When the Lights Went Out =

2012 film directed by Pat Holden

- Official poster featuring star Tasha Connor
- Directed by: Pat Holden
- Written by: Pat Holden
- Produced by: Bil Bungay; Deepak Nayar
- Starring: Kate Ashfield; Tasha Connor; Steven Waddington; Craig Parkinson; Martin Compston; Jo Hartley
- Music by: Marc Canham
- Distributed by: Bil Bungay
- Release dates: 31 January 2012 (International Film Festival Rotterdam); 13 September 2012 (United Kingdom)
- Running time: 86 minutes
- Country: United Kingdom
- Language: English

When the Lights Went Out is a 2012 British supernatural horror film directed by Pat Holden and starring Kate Ashfield, Tasha Connor, Steven Waddington, Craig Parkinson, Martin Compston, and Jo Hartley. It was released in the UK on 13 September 2012. The film premiered at the Rotterdam International Film Festival.

== Plot ==
In 1974, Len and Jenny Maynard (Steven Waddington and Kate Ashfield) move into a new home in Yorkshire, where their 13-year-old daughter Sally is haunted by the ghost of a young girl and the demonic ghost of a monk. Sally's history teacher, Mr Price (Martin Compston), learns that the family is haunted by the spirit of a young girl who was murdered in a forest, and informs Len. Sally's parents seek out the assistance of a paranormal specialist and a local priest. The specialist is able to make contact with the spirit but during the session, the group is attacked by it, and the specialist is unable to remove the spirits from their house.

Len and his friend, Brian (Craig Parkinson), convince Father Clifton (Gary Lewis) to perform an exorcism on their house. He initially refuses, citing lack of permission from the church, but they blackmail him by showing photos of Clifton engaging in an illicit affair with his housekeeper, Mrs Blithe. Clifton agrees and explains that the monk, while alive, preyed on young, uneducated girls in the neighbourhood and cut off their tongues so that they could not expose him. He killed the young girl in the forest, as she was educated, and could have exposed his deeds by writing about it. After the incident, the monk was secretly tried, hanged, and buried, in order to preserve the church's honour. They proceed with the exorcism at Len's house; the spirit violently resists but Clifton manages to drive it out.

The family returns to normal life, but one night, the spirit returns and attacks Sally, attempting to hang her. Len and Jenny try to save her but the spirit knocks them out. Sally then throws the young girl's locket into the electric heater, causing a fire. The young girl's spirit appears and confronts the evil monk's spirit, which is driven from the house. Following the incident, the family remain in the house, though Sally never enters her bedroom again.

== Cast ==
- Kate Ashfield as Jenny Maynard
- Steven Waddington as Len Maynard
- Tasha Connor as Sally Maynard
- Craig Parkinson as Brian
- Jo Hartley as Jeanette
- Martin Compston as Mr. Price
- Andrea Lowe as Rita
- Gary Lewis as Father Clifton
- Tony Pitts as Hilary Barnes
- Martina McClements as Mrs. Blithe
- Molly Windsor as pale girl
- Hannah Clifford as Lucy

== Production ==
According to the filmmakers, the story is "loosely" based on a claimed poltergeist haunting known as "The Black Monk of Pontefract", said to have occurred in the home of Joe and Jean Pritchard at 30 East Drive, Pontefract, West Yorkshire. According to Jean Pritchard's sister-in-law Renee Holden, alleged supernatural disturbances by a poltergeist given the nickname "Fred" included "throwing things around, freezing rooms down, creating water puddles and making noises". The Pritchards' daughter, Diane, was supposedly dragged upstairs by her neck. The incident was locally popular but "largely unknown elsewhere" until Colin Wilson wrote a book about it in 1981 that gained notoriety among paranormal aficionados. Director Pat Holden stated that he "embellished the story to make it fit it into a horror movie template".

== Reception ==
On Rotten Tomatoes, the film holds an approval rating of 36% based on 11 reviews, with a weighted average rating of 4.7/10.
