= Prawn Cocktail Offensive =

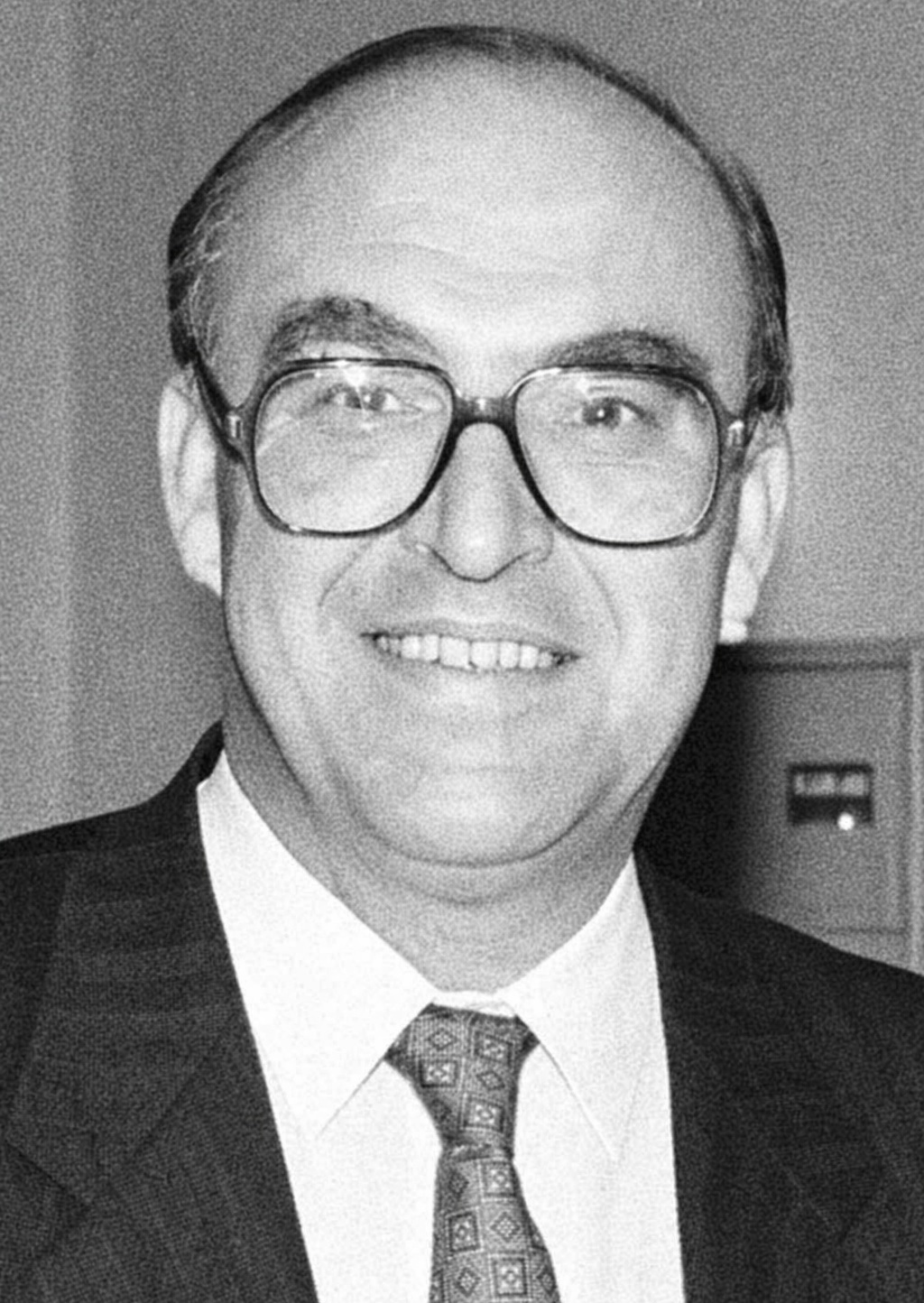
Shadow Chancellor John Smith

The Prawn Cocktail Offensive was the scornful name given to the British Labour Party's success (while in opposition in the 1990s) in winning trust and backing from the United Kingdom's financial sector.

The Prawn Cocktail Offensive was executed under the Shadow Chancellorship of John Smith, who accompanied Mo Mowlam on an extensive series of private lunches and conferences with City figures.

Keir Starmer's efforts to also win back the trust of the UK Financial sector has been described as a 'Prawn Cocktail Offensive 2.0'.

== Origin of name ==
A prawn cocktail is a seafood entrée popular (but regarded as something of a luxury) in the 1960s, 1970s and 1980s. By the time of Smith and Mowlam's operations it had acquired unfortunate connotations of naffness.

The combination of this dish with the well-known political phrase "charm offensive" was a reference to the "lunching" involved in Smith and Mowlam's plans.

The first use of the phrase "Prawn Cocktail Offensive" is currently unrecorded.

Believed to be a creation of journalists, the nickname sprang from remarks by senior Conservative politician Michael Heseltine, who in Parliament in February 1992 said:

I hear wherever I go that the right honourable and learned gentleman [John Smith] has become a star attraction in the City. Lunch after lunch, dinner after dinner, the assurances flow. Not a discordant crumb falls on to the thick pile. … Think of the tragedy, Mr. Deputy Speaker. All those prawn cocktails for nothing. Never have so many crustaceans died in vain. With all the authority I can command as Secretary of State for the Environment, let me say to the right honourable and learned member for Monklands East [Smith], "save the prawns".
