= Niceland (Population. 1.000.002) =

2004 film by Friðrik Þór Friðriksson

- Directed by: Friðrik Þór Friðriksson
- Written by: Huldar Breiðfjörð
- Produced by: Thor S Sigurjonsson; Skuli Fr Malmquist; Kate Barry; Mike Downey; Sam Taylor; Zorana Piggott; Helmut Weber
- Starring: Martin Compston; Gary Lewis; Peter Capaldi; Kerry Fox
- Cinematography: Morten Søborg
- Edited by: Sigvaldi J. Kárason; Anders Refn
- Music by: Mugison
- Distributed by: Zik Zak Kvikmyndir; Tradewind Pictures; Nimbus Film Productions; Film and Music Entertainment
- Release date: 2004
- Country: Iceland
- Language: English

Niceland (Population. 1.000.002) is a 2004 Icelandic drama directed by Friðrik Þór Friðriksson.

== Cast ==
- Martin Compston as Jed
- Gary Lewis as Max
- Peter Capaldi as John
- Kerry Fox as Mary
- Shauna Macdonald as Sandra
- Guðrún María Bjarnadóttir as Chloe (as Gudrun Maria Bjarnadottir)
- Guðrún Gísladóttir as Ruth (as Gudrun Gisladottir)
- Timmy Lang as Alex
- Ásta S. Ólafsdóttir as Mia
- Hugrún Þorfinnsdóttir as Diana
- Gísli Örn Garðarsson as Ethan
- Páll Sigþór Pálsson as Newsreader
- Þorsteinn J. Vilhjálmsson as News Reporter
- Andri Freyr Hilmarsson as Factory Worker
- Halldór Halldórsson as Factory Worker (as Halldór Steinn Halldórsson)
- Helga Pálína Sigurðardóttir as Factory Worker
- Helgi Hrafn Pálsson as Factory Worker
- Hlynur Steinarsson as Factory Worker
- Margrét Eiríksdóttir as Factory Worker
- Sigurþór Dan as Factory Worker
- Steve Hudson as Ikea Employee
- Steinunn Þorvaldsdóttir as Factory Worker
- Jón Ingi Hákonarson as Bus Driver
- Sigurður Skúlason as Middle Aged Driver
- Kristinn Vilbergsson as Young Driver
- Svana Friðriksdóttir as Woman in Flower Shop
- Sigríður Jóna Þórisdóttir as Woman in Bus
- Benóný Ægisson as Couple in Electric Store
- Júlía Hannam as Couple in Electric Store
- Birgitta Birgisdóttir as Bakery Assistant
- Thor Sigurjonsson as Couple in Bakery
- Line Lind as Couple in Bakery
- Kristin Ingveldur Ingólfsdóttir as Old Woman in Bakery
- Erlendur Eiríksson as Radio Hoste

== Release ==
Niceland was released on 5 July 2004.

== Awards ==
Edda Awards, Iceland

- In 2004, Niceland won the ‘Edda Award’ for Screenplay of the Year, for Huldar Breiðfjörð.
- In 2004 they were nominated for a ‘Edda Award’ for Best Film.

Karlovy Vary International Film Festival

- In 2004, Niceland was nominated for a ‘Crystal Globe’ award for Friðrik Þór Friðriksson
