= Lil Woods =

British actress (born 1998)

- Born: Lillian Grace Woods; 9 April 1998 (age 27); Harbury, Warwickshire, England
- Occupation: Actress
- Years active: 2008–2014

Lillian Grace Woods (born 9 April 1998) is a British former child actress who appeared in the film Nanny McPhee and the Big Bang as Megsie Green.

Woods' other film credits include Blessed (2008), Disco (2010) and Baby (2014). She attended Ysgol Bro Ddyfi, a school in Machynlleth.

== Filmography ==
Year	Title	Role	Notes	Refs.
2008	Blessed	Charlotte		
2010	Nanny McPhee and the Big Bang	Megsie Green		
2010	Disco	Rachel	Short film	
2014	Baby	Anya	Short film	
