= John Hannah (actor) =

Scottish actor (born 1962)

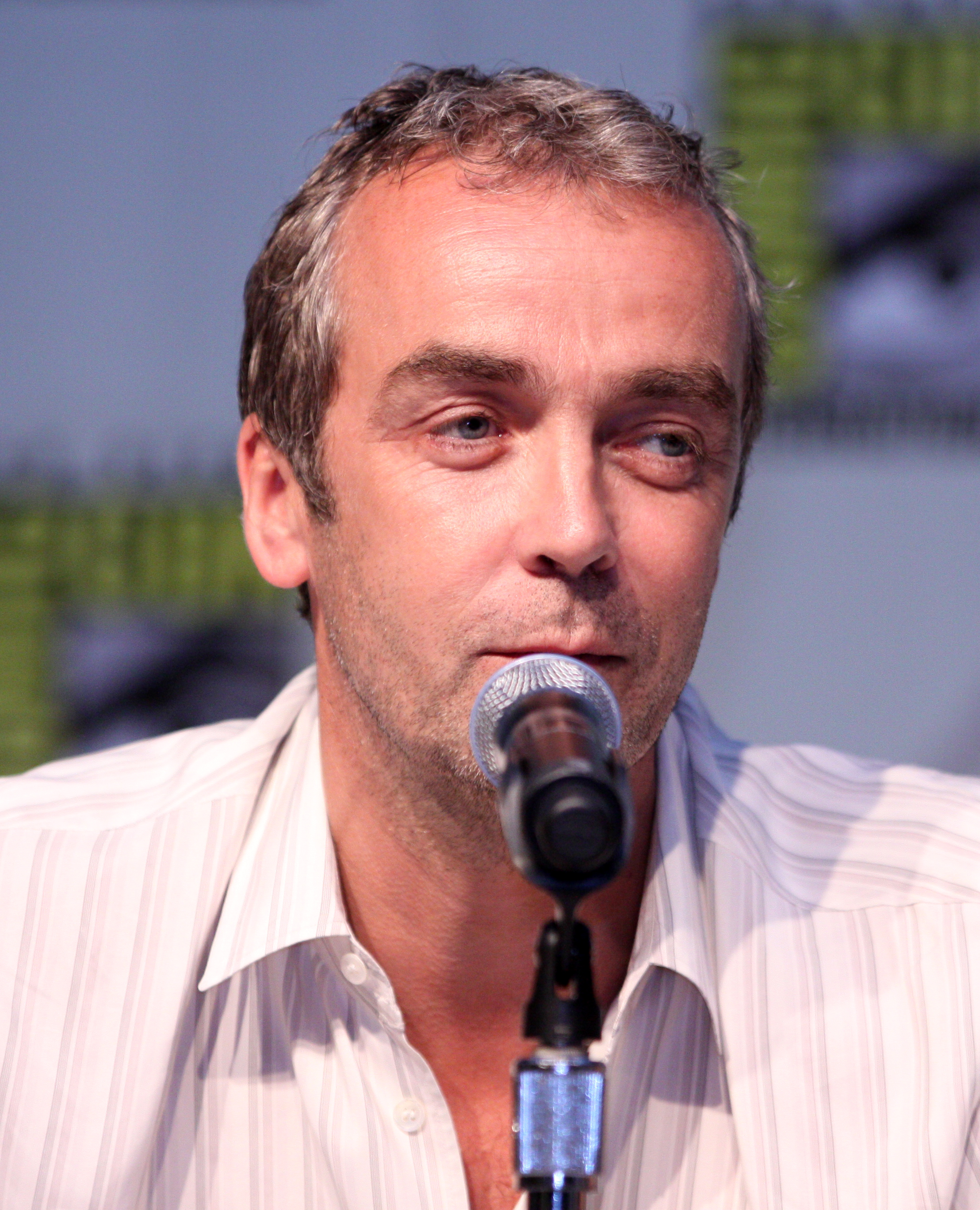
- Hannah at the 2010 San Diego Comic-Con
- Born: 23 April 1962 (age 64); East Kilbride, Lanarkshire, Scotland
- Education: Royal Conservatoire of Scotland
- Occupation: Actor
- Years active: 1987–present
- Spouse: Joanna Roth (m. 1996)
- Children: 2

John Hannah (born 23 April 1962) is a Scottish actor and narrator. He came to prominence in Four Weddings and a Funeral (1994), for which he was nominated for the BAFTA Award for Best Actor in a Supporting Role as Matthew. His other film appearances include Sliding Doors (1998), The Hurricane (1999), and The Mummy quadrilogy (1999–2027).

His television roles include Dr Iain McCallum in McCallum (1995–1998); the title character in Rebus (2000–2001); Jack Roper in New Street Law (2006–2007); Jake Osbourne in Cold Blood (2007–2008), Quintus Lentulus Batiatus in Spartacus (2010–2011), Jack Cloth in A Touch of Cloth (2012–2014), Jason's father (Aeson) in the BBC series Atlantis (2013–2015), and Dr. Holden Radcliffe in Agents of S.H.I.E.L.D. (2016–2017).

== Early life and education ==
Hannah was born in East Kilbride in Lanarkshire, the youngest of three children; he has two older sisters. His mother, Susan, was a cleaner at Marks & Spencer, and his father, John, a toolmaker.

He attended Heathery Knowe Primary School, then Claremont High School in East Kilbride and went on to an apprenticeship as an electrician. In East Kilbride, he participated in the East Kilbride Rep Theatre Club. At the suggestion of a colleague, after completing his apprenticeship, he attended the Royal Scottish Academy of Music and Drama.

== Career ==
After graduation, Hannah had parts in theatre productions, films and television, including leading roles such as Robert in the television adaptation of Frederic Lindsay's novel Brond (Channel 4, 1987).

He became known internationally with his appearance as Matthew in Four Weddings and a Funeral (1994). He played a psychopathic killer alongside Helen Baxendale in Truth or Dare, and a mystery-solving pathologist in McCallum.

On 24 December 1997, Hannah and Scottish Films producer Murray Ferguson established a production company called Clerkenwell Films. Clerkenwell's first big production was the Rebus series, including Black And Blue and The Hanging Garden. However, Rebus was later taken in-house by STV Productions, and Hannah was replaced in the leading role in the series by Ken Stott.

Hannah played the Monty Python-quoting love interest of Gwyneth Paltrow in the romantic comedy Sliding Doors (1998). He starred in the axed U.S. series MDs (2002), as well as making guest appearances in various other series.

He played a comic role as the brother of Rachel Weisz in The Mummy (1999), The Mummy Returns (2001) and The Mummy: Tomb of the Dragon Emperor (2008). In 2007–08, he played a starring role in the ITV crime drama Cold Blood.

He was the voice of the Co-operative Group adverts in Europe. He played the part of Quintus Lentulus Batiatus, the owner of a gladiator training house, in Spartacus: Blood and Sand and the prequel Spartacus: Gods of the Arena.

Hannah played the scientist Holden Radcliffe on Agents of S.H.I.E.L.D. in a recurring role during season three and got promoted to series regular during season four in 2016.

From 2017 he played Archie Wilson in the BBC series Trust Me.

Hannah plays the role of Dr. Jedidiah Bishop on the medical drama Transplant on CTV Canada.

Since 2019, he has narrated the BBC reality series Race Across the World, where five pairs of Brits travel across the world without taking a plane for just the price of the flight. As of 2026, Hannah has narrated all six regular series, as well as four featuring celebrities.

== Personal life ==
Hannah married actress Joanna Roth in 1996. The pair met several years before during a studio production of Shakespeare's Measure for Measure. In many of his interviews, he mentions stories from their relationship, such as their visit to London's Sri Siam restaurant where he proposed to her in writing on the tablecloth. They live in Richmond, London with their two children.

Hannah is an Arsenal F.C. fan.

== Filmography ==
=== Film ===
Year	Title	Role	Notes
1990	Harbour Beat	Neal McBride	
1994	Four Weddings and a Funeral	Matthew	
1995	Madagascar Skin	Harry	
1996	The Innocent Sleep	James	
1996	The Final Cut	Gilmore	
1997	The James Gang	Spendlove James	
1997	Romance and Rejection	Tony	
1998	Sliding Doors	James Hammerton	
1998	Resurrection Man	Darkie Larche	
1999	The Mummy	Jonathan Carnahan	
1999	The Hurricane	Terry Swinton	
1999	The Intruder	Charlie	
2000	Circus	Leo	
2000	Pandaemonium	William Wordsworth	
2001	The Mummy Returns	Jonathan Carnahan	
2002	Dr Jekyll and Mr Hyde	Jekyll and Hyde	
2002	Camouflage	Man invited	Short film
2002	Before You Go	Mike Pennington	
2002	I'm with Lucy	Doug	
2003	I accuse	Richard Darian	
2004	Male Mail	Alan	Short film
2007	Ghost Son	Mark	
2007	The Last Legion	Nestor	
2008	The Mummy: Tomb of the Dragon Emperor	Jonathan Carnahan	
2008	Zip 'n Zoo	Tom	Short film
2012	The Words	Richard Ford	
2013	The Wee Man	Tam McGraw	
2013	The Christmas Candle	William Barstow	
2014	Shooting for Socrates	Billy Bingham	
2014	Ping Pong Summer	Mr Miracle	
2015	Angel	Lapslie	AKA Still Waters
2015	Bone in the Throat	Sullivan	
2017	Another Mother's Son	Arthur	
2017	Love of My Life	Richard	
2018	Genesis	Paul Brooks	
2018	Scorched Earth	Doc	
2018	Overboard	Colin	
2018	Blood, Sweat and Terrors	James Borans	Segment: "Get Some"
2019	Princess Emmy	King Karl	Voice
2019	The Garden of Evening Mists	Magnus Gemmell	
2020	Enemy Lines	Colonel Preston	
2020	The Intergalactic Adventures of Max Cloud	Revengor (Justin)	
2021	The Auschwitz Report	Warren	
2024	Damaged	Colin McGregor	
2024	Bermondsey Tales: Fall Of The Roman Empire	The Postman	
2026	The Incomer	Finman	
2026	Bad Day at the Office	Karl Davis	
2027	The Mummy: Book of the Dead	Jonathan Carnahan	Filming

=== Television ===
Year	Title	Role	Notes
1987	Brond	Robert	3 episodes
1988	Bookie	Johnny Dawson	3 episodes
1988	Screen Two	Pretty Boy	Episode: "Reasonable Force"
1990	Taggart	Danny Bonnar	3 episodes
1990	Boon	Willie Connolly	Episode: "Work, Rest & Play"
1991	Shrinks	Hamish	Episode #1.4
1992	The Bill	Derek Pierce	Episode: 'Trial and Error"
1992	Civvies	Dan Walker	Episode #1.3
1992	Between the Lines	D.C. Mellis	Episode: 'Nothing Personal"
1993	Paul Calf's Video Diary	Mark	TV short
1994	Capital Lives	John Robinson	Episode: "Joan"
1994	Faith	Nick Simon	Television film
1994	Pauline Calf's Wedding Video	Mark	Television film
1994	Milner	Windscreen washer	Television film
1995	Out of the Blue	D.S. Frankie Drinkall	6 episodes
1995–1998	McCallum	Dr. Iain McCallum	8 episodes
1996	Truth or Dare	Nick	Television film
1996	Circles of Deceit: Kalon	Jason Sturden	Television film
1997	The Love Bug	Simon Moore III	Television film
2000–2001	Rebus	D.I. John Rebus	4 episodes
2001	Alias	Martin Shepard	2 episodes
2002	MDs	Dr. Robert Dalgety	10 episodes
2003	Frasier	Avery McManus	Episode s10e20: "Farewell, Nervosa"
2003	Carnivàle	Stangler	2 episodes
2004	Agatha Christie's Marple	Inspector Tom Campbell	Episode: 4:50 from Paddington
2004	Amnesia	D.S. Mackenzie Stone	2 episodes
2005–2007	Cold Blood	Jake Osbourne	5 episodes
2005	Sea of Souls	John Wade	2 episodes
2006–2007	New Street Law	Jack Roper	14 episodes
2007	Sinking of the Lusitania: Terror at Sea	Prof. Ian Holbourn	TV docudrama
2008	Agatha Christie's Poirot Appointment with Death	Dr. Gerard	
2010	Spartacus: Blood and Sand	Quintus Lentulus Batiatus	13 episodes
2011	Kidnap and Ransom	Alexander Willard	2 episodes
2011	Spartacus: Gods of the Arena	Quintus Lentulus Batiatus	6 episodes
2012	The Other Wife	Richard Kendall	2 episodes
2012	Damages	Rutger Simon	10 episodes
2012–2014	A Touch of Cloth	D.I. Jack Cloth	6 episodes
2013–2015	Atlantis	Aeson (Jason's Father)	3 episodes
2013	Elementary	Rhys	S1 Episode 15: "A Giant Gun, Filled with Drugs"
2014	The Widower	DS Charlie Henry	2 episodes
2015–2016	Marley's Ghosts	Adam	9 episodes
2016	A Midsummer Night's Dream	Duke Theseus	Television film
2016–2017	Agents of S.H.I.E.L.D.	Holden Radcliffe	22 episodes
2017	Dirk Gently's Holistic Detective Agency	The Mage	8 episodes
2019–present	Race Across the World	Narrator	60 episodes
2019	The Victim	DI Stephen Grover	4 episodes
2019	Trust Me	Dr. Archie Watson	4 episodes
2020	Transplant	Dr. Jed Bishop	Series regular
2020	Roald & Beatrix: The Tail of the Curious Mouse	Narrator	Television film
2021	Taskmaster	Himself	New Years Day special
2023	The Last of Us	Dr. Neuman	Episode: "When You're Lost in the Darkness"
2023	Black Mirror	Richard King	Episode: "Loch Henry"
2023	Silent Witness	Dr Charles Beck	2 episodes
2024	The Decameron	Eduardo	1 episode
2025	Sandokan	Sergeant Murray	8 episodes
2026	Benidorm Is Murder	Dennis Crown	6 episodes

=== Video games ===
Year	Title	Role
2008	The Mummy: Tomb of the Dragon Emperor	Jonathan Carnahan

== Theatre ==
Year	Title	Role	Company	Director	Notes
1987	The Gorbals Story	Johnnie Martin	7:84	David Hayman	play by Robert McLeish
