= Arthur Thompson (gangster) =

Scottish gangster (1931–1993)

- Born: September 1931; Springburn, Glasgow, Scotland
- Died: 13 March 1993 (aged 61); Glasgow, Scotland
- Occupation: Organised crime boss

Arthur Thompson (September 1931 – 13 March 1993) was a Scottish gangster who was active in Glasgow from the 1950s and took charge of organised crime in the city for over thirty years.

== Thompson crime family ==
Born in September 1931 in the industrial area of Springburn, Glasgow, Arthur Thompson began his career as a money lender, and was said to crucify those who did not repay their debts, by nailing them to floors or doors. Protection rackets soon followed, and he was also involved in bank robberies and heists for a time. Thompson then went on to invest his money into legitimate businesses, which grew more and more over the years, making him a very wealthy man. By the 1980s, the Thompson family had entered the drug trade, led by Thompson's son Arthur Jr. It was rumoured that, by the 1990s, Thompson was earning some £100,000 a week as a loan shark (money lender).

Thompson was one of the most feared criminals in Scotland. In 1966, he narrowly escaped death when a bomb exploded under his car; his mother-in-law, in the passenger seat, was killed. Shortly afterwards, he spotted two men he suspected of the attack, Patrick Welsh and James Goldie, members of the rival Welsh family Blackhill gang. He forced their van off the road by driving his own car directly at it – the van hit a lamp post and both men were killed. Thompson was charged with murder but not prosecuted as the police could find no witnesses who would testify. In 1969, Thompson's wife Rita forced her way into the Welsh home and stabbed Patrick Welsh's widow in the chest; she was jailed for three years. His grandchildren and great-grandchildren have to remain anonymous for the safety of the family.

Thompson also survived two further attempts on his life; he was shot in the groin outside his home – "The Ponderosa" in Provanmill, named after a ranch in the Western television series Bonanza – in 1985. In 1988, Thompson suffered a broken leg after he was run over by a car and shot at, again outside his home.

=== The shooting of his son ===
On 18 August 1991 Thompson's son Arthur Jr (nicknamed "Fat Boy") died after being shot three times outside the family home, "The Ponderosa".

A former enforcer for the Thompson family, Paul Ferris, was arrested, charged with the murder and remanded to HM Prison Barlinnie. On the day of Thompson Jr's funeral a car was found containing the bodies of two friends of Ferris, Robert Glover and Joe Hanlon, who were also suspected of involvement in his death and had been killed by gunshots to the back of the head and the anus. Their bodies had been dumped on the route of Thompson Jr's funeral procession, so that his hearse passed their dead bodies. There was further drama that day as there was also a bomb scare at the cemetery where Thompson Jr was due to be buried. Paul Ferris was charged with Arthur Thompson Jr's murder and tried in 1992 but was found not guilty and released.

Over 300 witnesses, including Thompson Sr, were called to give evidence at a trial which lasted fifty four days and cost £4.1 million, at the time the longest and most expensive trial in Scottish legal history. Ferris claimed the younger Thompson had been shot by a hit man known only as "The Apprentice". He was acquitted of all charges.

== Death ==
Thompson died at the Glasgow Royal Infirmary on 13 March 1993 from a heart attack at the age of 61. He was buried in Riddrie Park Cemetery in the family plot together with his mother-in-law and his son Arthur Jr.

== Other children ==
Thompson's daughter, Margaret, died from a drug overdose in 1989.

His other son, Billy, was stabbed and seriously wounded 400 yards (350 metres) from the family home in 2000, but survived. Billy had recently served a prison sentence for possessing a harpoon gun. He had been given two-and-a-half years, reduced on appeal to 18 months. Billy died on 4 March 2017 as a result of his drug addiction.

Thompson is survived by Tracey Thompson, his last remaining child.
