= Martin Compston =

Scottish actor (born 1984)

- Compston in 2026
- Born: 8 May 1984 (age 42); Greenock, Inverclyde, Scotland
- Occupations: Actor, former professional footballer
- Years active: 2002–present
- Known for: Line of Duty
- Spouse: Tianna Chanel Flynn (m. 2016)
- Children: 1
Association football career
- Position: Defender
Youth career
- Aberdeen
- –2001: Greenock Morton
Senior career*
Years	Team	Apps	(Gls)
2001–2002	Greenock Morton	2	(0)
- Greenock Juniors
- * Club domestic league appearances and goals

Martin Compston (born 8 May 1984) is a Scottish actor and former professional footballer who played as a defender. He plays Anti-Corruption Unit Detective Inspector Steve Arnott in the BBC drama Line of Duty, Liam in Ken Loach's Sweet Sixteen, Paul Ferris in The Wee Man, Ewan Brodie in Monarch of the Glen, and Dan Docherty in The Nest.

== Early life, family and education ==
Compston was born to a Catholic family, the younger of two brothers, The boys were raised in Greenock, Scotland. Martin attended St Columba's High School in neighbouring Gourock.

== Football career ==
A promising footballer, he was a youth player with Aberdeen as a teenager, and after leaving school signed for his local professional club, Greenock Morton.

Compston made two first-team appearances in the 2001–02 season, in which the team was relegated to the Third Division. In both matches he appeared as a substitute and Morton lost 4–0, to Alloa Athletic and Queen of the South. After leaving Morton he briefly played in junior football for Greenock Juniors.

== Acting career ==
Having never acted before, Compston successfully auditioned for the lead role in Ken Loach's Sweet Sixteen, which was being filmed locally. The film's success at the Cannes Film Festival gave him instant celebrity status in Scotland. Both he and his co-star William Ruane were nominated for Most Promising Newcomer at the British Independent Film Awards, with Compston winning the category.

He had a regular role in the BBC TV serial Monarch of the Glen. He then appeared in three films: A Guide to Recognizing Your Saints (Jury Prize and Best Ensemble Cast at the Sundance Festival) with Robert Downey, Jr.; Red Road (Jury Prize at Cannes), shot in Scotland with Kate Dickie and Tony Curran, for which he was nominated as Best Supporting Actor at the Scottish BAFTAs; and True North with Peter Mullan and Gary Lewis, for which he was nominated as Best Actor at the British Independent Film Awards.

Compston starred in the 2010 film Soulboy, alongside Craig Parkinson, playing the role of Joe McCain. He also made a cameo appearance in a low-budget web series, Night is Day. Compston appeared in The View's music video for "Grace" and "How Long". In 2012 Compston played the lead role of Detective Sergeant Steve Arnott, a detective in an anti-corruption squad, in the BBC police drama Line of Duty, acting alongside Craig Parkinson once more. In the same year he also starred in the violent thriller Piggy. Going back to his Scottish roots, he then appeared in the lead role in The Wee Man, directed by Ray Burdis, a film depicting the life of the Glasgow gangster Paul Ferris. It was released in the UK in January 2013.

In April 2013 Compston starred in the ITV miniseries The Ice Cream Girls. He appeared as Roy James in The Great Train Robbery.

In 2014, 2016, 2017, 2019 and 2021 Compston reprised his lead role of Detective Sergeant Steve Arnott in five more series of police drama Line of Duty, which moved from BBC Two to BBC One at the start of its fourth series. In 2016 he starred in the three-part Scottish television series In Plain Sight as serial murderer Peter Manuel. In 2020, he starred alongside Sophie Rundle in the television series The Nest. In 2021 Compston was cast to star as Fulmer Hamilton in the Amazon Prime Video thriller The Rig, which was released in January 2023. In March 2022, Compston starred in Our House. The drama series is based on the novel Our House by Louise Candlish.

== Personal life ==
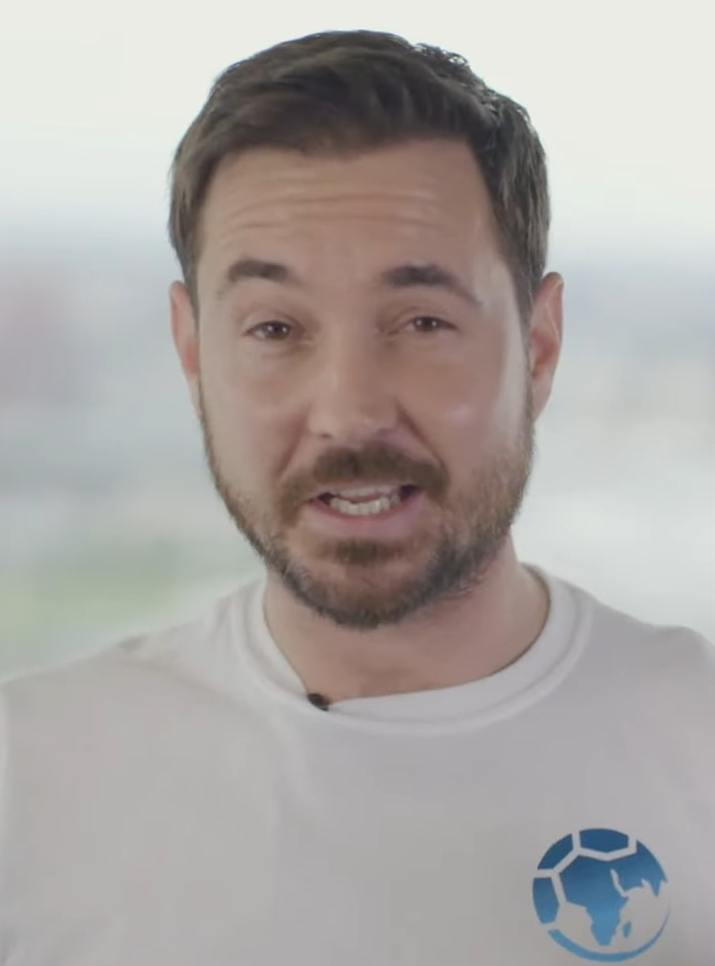
Compston in 2019

In 2016 Compston married Tianna Chanel Flynn, an American actress. They have a son and live in both Scotland and Las Vegas.

== Political views ==
Compston is a supporter of Scottish independence and the Scottish National Party.

== Filmography ==
=== Film ===
Year	Film	Role	Notes
2002	Sweet Sixteen	Liam	
2004	Niceland (Population. 1.000.002)	Jed	
2005	Tickets	Jamesy	
2005	Wild Country	Lee	
2006	A Guide to Recognizing Your Saints	Mike O'Shea	
2006	Red Road	Stevie	
2006	True North	Sean	
2008	Doomsday	Joshua	
2008	Freakdog	Sean	
2008	The Prayer	Stevie	Short
2009	The Damned United	John O'Hare	
2009	The Disappearance of Alice Creed	Danny	
2009	Spunkbubble	Togs	Short
2010	Pimp	Zeb	
2010	Soulboy	Joe McCain	
2010	Donkeys	Stevie Blantyre	
2010	Village on the Roof	Allen	Short
2010	Paris/Sexy	Seamus	Short
2011	Ghosted	Paul	
2011	7 Lives	Rory	
2011	Four	Lover	
2011	How to Stop Being a Loser	Adams	
2011	Hit and Run	Daz	Short
2012	When the Lights Went Out	Mr. Price	
2012	Sister	Mike	
2012	Strippers vs Werewolves	Scott	
2012	Piggy	Joe	
2013	The Wee Man	Paul Ferris	
2013	Filth	Gorman	
2015	The Legend of Barney Thomson	Chris Porter	
2015	Scottish Mussel	Ritchie	
2017	The Hunter's Prayer	Metzger	
2018	Mary Queen of Scots	Lord Bothwell	
2019	The Aftermath	Burnham	

=== Television ===
Year	Title	Role	Notes
2003	The Royal	Jeffrey Carpenter	Episode: "Snakes and Ladders"
2003	Rockface	Jason Farinelli	2 episodes
2003–2005	Monarch of the Glen	Ewan Brodie	Series regular
2004	Casualty	Matty Howell	Episode: "Lock Down"
2007	Night Is Day	Head Gangster	Episode: "Sacrifices"
2009	Eadar-Chluich		Episode: "Bha Mi'n Raoir san Taigh-Osta"
2010	Five Daughters	Jon	1 episode
2012–2026	Line of Duty	DS/DI Steve Arnott	Series regular
2013	The Ice Cream Girls	Marcus Hansley	Mini-series
2013	Agatha Christie's Marple	Alfred Pollock	Episode: "Greenshaw's Folly"
2013	The Great Train Robbery	Roy James	Mini-series
2014	Silent Witness	DS Jason Ross	Episode: "In a Lonely Place"
2014	Ripper Street	Edwin Havelock	Episode: "Live Free, Live True"
2016	Death in Paradise	Dexter Allen	Episode: "Dishing Up Murder"
2016	In Plain Sight	Peter Manuel	Mini-series
2017	Victoria	Dr. Traill	Episode: "Faith, Hope & Charity"
2018	Urban Myths	Midge Ure	Episode: "Backstage at Live Aid"
2019	Still Game	Phone Shop Assistant	Episode: "Local Hero"
2019–2022	Traces	Daniel MacAfee	Series regular
2020	The Nest	Dan Docherty	Mini-series
2021	Vigil	CPO Craig Burke	Series 1: Series regular
2022	Our House	Bram Lawson	
2022	Martin Compston's Scottish Fling	Himself	Travel mini-series
2022	Mayflies	Jimmy	Two-part drama
2023–present	The Rig	Fulmer Hamilton	
2024	Martin Compston's Norwegian Fling	Himself	Travel mini-series
2025	Fear	Martyn	Mini-series. Lead Role
2025	The Revenge Club	Calum Baird	6 episodes
2026	Red Eye	Clay Brody	Series two
