= Tradewind Pictures =

Tradewind Pictures is a German production company, founded in 1998. It produces both feature films – primarily children's films and family films – and documentaries. Among its productions are Erik of het klein insectenboek (2004), Niceland (Population. 1.000.002) (2004), and Fíaskó (2000). The company was founded by Thomas Springer and Helmut G. Weber, and has offices in Cologne and Erfurt.
