= Mike Downey (producer) =

British film producer

Mike Downey OBE
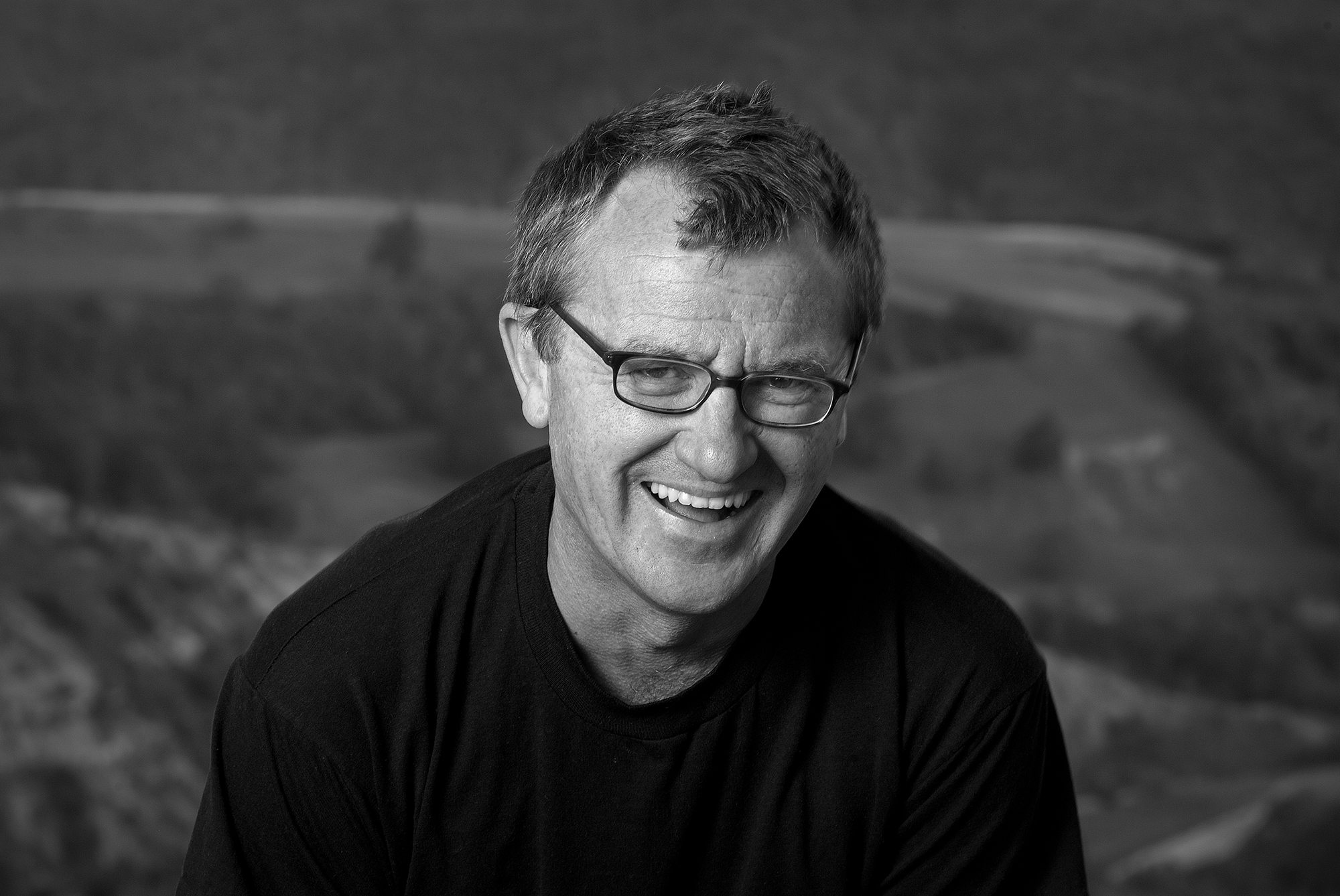
- Born: Devon, England
- Education: University of Warwick; University of Paris III: Sorbonne Nouvelle; Paris X Nanterre
- Occupation: Film producer
- Website: www.mikedowney.eu

Michael Downey OBE is an Irish-British film producer. He is the co-founder and CEO of Film and Music Entertainment and as of 2020 the Chairman of the European Film Academy.

== Early years ==
Downey was born in Devon, England, the son of Brigid Downey (née Flood) and Thomas Downey, who were economic migrants from Kildare, Ireland. The family moved to Taunton, Somerset, where he attended the St George's Roman Catholic School and Huish's Grammar School aka Richard Huish College.

== Education and career ==
After gaining a BA degree in French with Theatre Studies at the University of Warwick, Downey went on to continue post-graduate studies at the University of Paris III: Sorbonne Nouvelle (as a Boursier du Gouvernement Francais/French Government Scholar), and Paris X Nanterre. While working towards his MA and then PhD, he taught at the Lycée Charlemagne and at the theatre school at the Théâtre des Amandiers, under Patrice Chereau.

The 1980s saw Downey working as a theatre director France, Germany, the former Yugoslavia and the U.K. in theatres as varied an eclectic as The Gate (London), Bac To Bac Theatre (Exeter), Atelje 212 (Belgrade), Studiotheater and Theater Rechts der Isar (Munich) and the UK's National Student Theatre Company.

In 1986 and 1987, Downey curated a number of film programmes at the National Film Theatre. Among the most significant were the three major seasons he programmed of Yugoslav Cinema. In 1986, he also published his first book, The Self Managing Screen, written by Downey to coincide with a major retrospective of television fiction at the British Film Institute that he curated at the National Film Theatre on the subject of television fiction during the time of the Socialist Federal Republic of Jugoslavija.

In 1990, he co-founded Moving Pictures International magazine in London and it rapidly became one of the key international trade papers serving the global film industry, alongside Variety, The Hollywood Reporter and Screen International.

A decade later, in 2000, Downey joined forces with fellow producer Sam Taylor, to create the UK-based independent production house Film and Music Entertainment (F&ME) as part of a public offering on the Frankfurt Neuer Markt. As of 2020, F&ME is based in Dublin, Ireland.

His work as a film maker has seen projects developed with novelists James Ellroy, the late Gunter Grass, and Thomas Keneally (Schindler's List); IDA writer Rebecca Lenckiewicz, VICE Group founder and CEO Shane Smith, as well as directors such as Volker Schloendorff, Mohsen Makhmalbaf, and Julien Temple; and writers of the ilk of Lee Hall, Colm Tóibín,} and David Grossman.

In his career as a film producer he has worked with a wide range of directors, including Peter Greenaway, Agnieszka Holland, Paweł Pawlikowski, Andrzej Jakimowski, Rajko Grlić, Srđan Karanovićc, Juraj Jakubisko, Fridrik Thor Fridriksson, and Stephen Daldry, as well as a multitude of other helmers the length and breadth of Europe, South America, Africa and India.

In 2002, he wrote and edited The Film Finance Handbook, published by Wallflower Press, which acts as a guide for anyone planning to set out as a producer of films.

In 2004, Downey joined the European Film Academy Board and was elected deputy chairman in 2014, and was also elected as EFA chairman in 2020.

He has served two terms as a BAFTA Council member and in 2008 he was a member of the BAFTA Film Committee. Downey rejoined the BAFTA Council in 2020.

Downey is founder and President of the Motovun Film Festival in Croatia, artistic advisor to the Zagreb Film Festival, artistic director to the Antalya Film Festival and former artistic board member of the Pula Film Festival.

He has been a trustee of the White Ribbon Alliance since 2010, and as of 2017 was on the International board of trustees of The Isango Ensemble, a South African theatre company.

A member of the Asia Pacific Screen Academy (APSA) since 2017, Downey was as a former APSA Cultural Diversity Award winner a jury member at the 2019 APSA's.

Serving on more than 20 international juries at film festivals worldwide, including the Sarajevo Film Festival, Festival do Rio de Janeiro, Cottbus International Film Festival, Warsaw International Film Festival, Istanbul Film Festival, Montreal World Film Festival, Motovun Film Festival, Sofia International Film Festival, Transylvania International Film Festival, Krakow Film Festival, Cartagena International Film Festival (FICCI) and Zagreb Film Festival.

Downey is also an alumnus of The Sundance Institute, and quondam Thomas Ewing Professor of Film at Ohio University.

== Recognition ==
In 2009, Downey's work as a producer was honored with a retrospective at the Croatia's largest cultural event, the Zagreb Film Festival.

In 2014, he received Producer of the Decade Award from the Fort Lauderdale International Film Festival, presented by Stephen Daldry.

In 2015, Prague's Febiofest also celebrated Downey's career as a producer with a retrospective tribute.

In September 2020, it was announced that Downey would be the Honorary President of the 2020/2021 jury for the revamped LUX Prize, renamed LUX – the European Audience Film Award by the European Parliament and the European Film Academy (also known as LUX European Audience Film Award).

It was also in September 2020 that Downey launched the International Coalition for Film Makers at Risk (ICFR) at the Venice Film festival. The ICFR aims to activate the film community's collective response to filmmakers who face political persecution for their work. Downey is a founder and board member, and the European Film Academy, the International Film Festival Rotterdam, and IDFA are the founding partners of the ICFR, with activities that include advocacy, support, monitoring, and observation.

Downey was appointed Officer of the Order of the British Empire (OBE) in the 2021 Birthday Honours for services to British cinema.

== Selected filmography ==
- Charuga (1991, directed by Rajko Grlic) (associate producer)
- Before the Rain (1994, directed by Milcho Manchevski) (thanks)
- Pony Trek (1995, directed by Titta Karakorpi) (William)
- 13th Rider (TV Series, 1997– ) (William)
- Cannes: The Agony and the Ecstasy (1998, directed by Stephanie R.M. Smith) (self)
- Dubrovnik Twilight (1999, directed by Željko Senečić) (producer)
- Seven Days to Live (2000, directed by Sebastian Niemann) (associate producer)
- Josephine (2001, directed by Rajko Grlic) (co-producer)
- Falcons (2002, directed by Friðrik Þór Friðriksson) (Producer)
- Deathwatch (2002, directed by Michael J. Bassett) (producer)
- Loving Glances (2003, directed by Srdan Karanovic ) (producer)
- Cold Light (2004, directed by Hilmar Oddsson) (co-producer)
- Niceland (Population. 1.000.002) (2004, directed by Friðrik Þór Friðriksson) (co-producer)
- Strings (2004, directed by Anders Rønnow Klarlund) (co-producer)
- My Brother Is a Dog (2004, directed by Peter Timm) (co-producer)
- Guy X (2005, directed by Saul Metzstein) (producer)
- Murk (2005, directed by Jannik Johansen) (co-producer)
- The Headsman (2005, directed by Simon Aeby) (co-producer)
- Eleven Men Out (2005, directed by Róbert Ingi Douglas) (co-producer)
- The Call of the Toad (2005, directed by Robert Glinski) (co-producer)
- Son of Man (2006, directed by Mark Dornford-May) (executive producer)
- The Border Post (2006, directed by Rajko Grlic) (producer)
- Mystery of the Wolf (2006, directed by Raimo O Niemi) (co-producer)
- Anastezsi (2007, directed by Miguel Alcantud) (co-producer)
- Dorks and Damsels (2007, directed by Gunnar B. Guðmundsson) (co-producer)
- Quest for a Heart (2007, directed by Pekka Lehtosaari) (co-executive producer) / (co-producer)
- Mirror Maze (2008, directed by Guillermo Fernandez Groizard) (producer)
- Bathory: Countess of Blood (2008, directed by Juraj Jakubisko) (producer)
- Buick Riviera (2008, directed by Goran Rušinović) (co-producer: United Kingdom)
- White Lightnin' (2009, directed by Dominic Murphy) (producer)
- Donkey (2009, directed by Antonio Nuic) (co-producer)
- Reykjavik Whale Watching Massacre (2009, directed by Júlíus Kemp) (producer)
- Turtle: The Incredible Journey (2009, directed by Nick Stringer) (producer)
- A Congregation of Ghosts (2009, directed by Mark Collicott) (executive producer)
- The Mortician (2011, directed by Gareth Maxwell Roberts) (co-producer)
- Our Own Oslo (2011, directed by Reynir Lyngdal) (co-producer)
- Street Kids United (2011, directed by Tim Pritchard) (producer)
- The Parade (2011, directed by Srdan Dragojevic) (co-producer)
- Body of Water (2011, directed by Joona Tena) (special thanks)
- Silent Sonata (2011, directed by Janez Burger) (special thanks)
- Zagreb Stories Vol. 2 (2012, various directors per episode) (co-producer)
- The Zigzag Kid (2012, directed by Vincent Bal) (co-producer)
- Lilet Never Happened (2012, directed by Jacco Groen) (co-producer)
- Goltzius and the Pelican Company (2012, directed by Peter Greenaway) (co-producer)
- Imagine (2012, directed by Andrzej Jakimowski) (co-producer)
- Rölli ja kultainen avain (2013, directed by Taavi Vartiainen) (co-producer – uncredited)
- The Arbiter (2013, directed by Kadri Kõusaar) (executive producer)
- Od danas do sutra (short) (2013, directed by Sara Hribar) (producer)
- Noye's Fludde – Unogumbe (short) (2013, directed by Mark Dornford-May) (executive producer)
- Amsterdam Express (2014, directed by Fatmir Koçi) (co-producer)
- Holidays in the Sun (2014, directed by Srdjan Dragojevic) (consulting producer)
- President Nixon's Present (short) (2014, directed by Igor Seregi) (executive producer)
- Monument to Michael Jackson (2014, directed by Darko Lungulov) (executive producer)
- Lost in Karastan (2014, directed by Ben Hopkins) (producer)
- The President (2014, directed by Mohsen Makhmalbaf) (producer)
- Andelé vsedního dne (2014, directed by Alice Nellis) (co-producer)
- Rio 50 Degrees: Carry On CaRIOca! (TV Episode, 2014, season 23, episode 1) (producer)
- Imagine (TV Series documentary, 2014, 1 episode) (producer)
- Breathe Umphefumlo (2015, directed by Mark Dornford-May) (executive producer)
- Life Is a Trumpet (2015, directed by Antonio Nuic) (co-producer)
- Streetkids United II: The Girls From Rio (documentary) (2015, directed by Maria Clara Costa) (producer)
- Paul (documentary short) (2015, directed by Victor van Vloten, Robert van Wingerden) (executive producer)
- A Stinking Fairytale (2015, directed by Miroslav Momcilovic) (producer)
- Paul (2015, directed by Victor van Vloten, Robert van Wingerden) (executive producer)
- The Liberation of Skopje (2016, directed by Rade Šerbedžija and Danilo Šerbedžija) (co-producer)
- The Constitution (2016, directed by Rajko Grlic) (co-producer)
- Light Thereafter (2016, directed by Konstantin Bojanov) (producer)
- Dede (2016, directed by Mariam Khatchvani) (producer)
- Brimstone (2016, directed by Martin Koolhoven) (special thanks)
- Return to Montauk (2017, directed by Volker Schlöndorff) (co-producer)
- Tom of Finland (2017, directed by Dome Karukoski) (executive producer)
- Elvis Walks Home (2017, directed by Fatmir Koci) (producer)
- Dede (2017, directed by Mariam Khatchvani) (producer)
- Ana, My Love (2017, directed by Calin Peter Netzer) (special thanks)
- Light Thereafter (2017, directed by Konstantin Bojanov) (producer)
- Once Upon a Time in November (2017, directed by Andrzej Jakimowski) (associate producer)
- April's Daughter (2017, directed by Michel Franco) (consulting producer)
- The Man with the Magic Box (2017, directed by Bodo Kox) (associate producer)
- The 2017 European Film Awards (TV Special, 2017, directed by Maria von Heland, Nadja Zonsarowa) (self)
- Ruben Brandt, Collector (2018, directed by Milorad Krstic) (special thanks)
- Home (2018, directed by Dario Pleic) (producer)
- Fighting for Life (2018, directed by Jamilla van der Hulst, Ian Greyvensteyn) (executive producer)
- The 2018 European Film Awards (TV Special, 2018, directed by Maria von Heland, Nadja Zonsarowa) (self)
- How to Fake a War (2019, directed by Rudolph Herzog) (producer)
- Shindisi (2019, directed by Dito Tsintzadze) (producer)
- Streetkids United 3 - The Road to Moscow (2019, directed by Jacco Groen) (co-producer)
- Servants (2020, directed by Ivan Ostrochovsky) (producer)
- Charlatan (2020, directed by Agnieszka Holland) (co-producer)
- Rise and Fall of Comrade Zylo (2021, directed by Fatmir Koci) (producer, writer)
