= List of German films of 2014 =

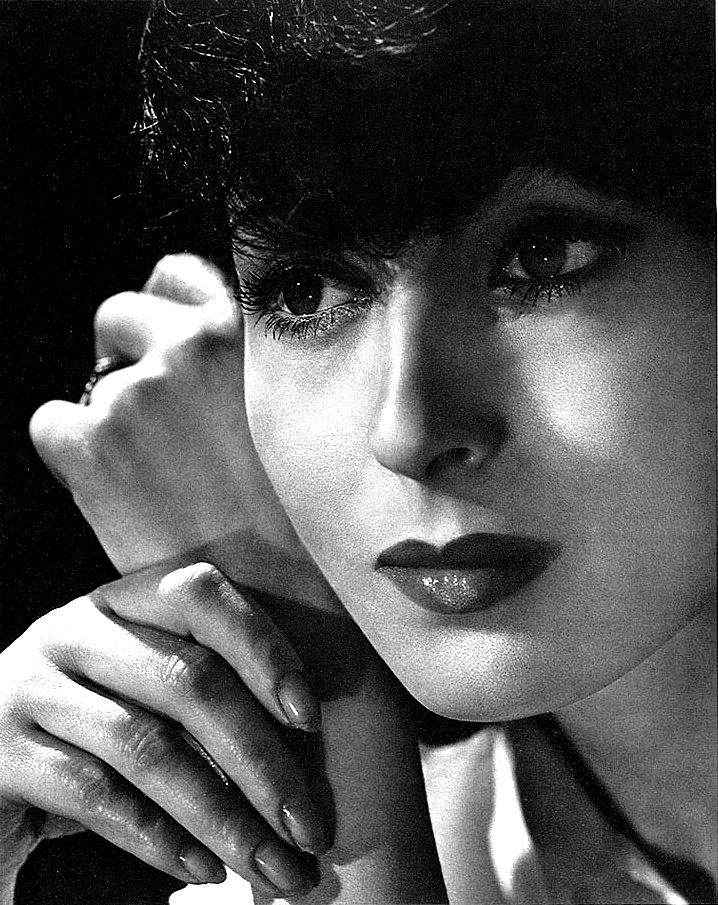
2014 saw the death of Luise Rainer.

The German film industry produced over four hundred feature films in 2014. This article fully lists all non-pornographic films, including short films, that had a release date in that year and which were at least partly made by Germany. It does not include films first released in previous years that had release dates in 2014.

Also included is an overview of the major events in German film, including film festivals and awards ceremonies, as well as lists of those films that have been particularly well received, both critically and financially.

== Major releases ==
=== January–June ===
| Opening | | Title | Cast and crew | Studio | Genre(s) | Ref. |
|---|---|---|---|---|---|---|
| J A N U A R Y | 17 | Reasonable Doubt | Director: Peter Howitt; Cast: Dominic Cooper, Samuel L. Jackson | Dutch FilmWorks | Crime; Thriller | |
| J A N U A R Y | 19 | A Most Wanted Man | Director: Anton Corbijn; Cast: Philip Seymour Hoffman, Rachel McAdams, Robin Wright, Willem Dafoe, Grigoriy Dobrygin | Entertainment One | Thriller | |
| J A N U A R Y | 19 | The Voices | Director: Marjane Satrapi; Cast: Ryan Reynolds, Gemma Arterton, Anna Kendrick, Jacki Weaver | Lions Gate Entertainment | Horror; Comedy | |
| J A N U A R Y | 22 | Lost in Karastan | Director: Ben Hopkins; Cast: Matthew Macfadyen, MyAnna Buring, Noah Taylor, Ali Cook | Brandstorm Entertainment AG | Comedy | |
| F E B R U A R Y | 1 | Blood Valley: Seed's Revenge | Director: Marcel Walz; Cast: Manoush, Nick Principe, Sarah Hayden, Annika Strauss, Natalie Scheetz, Caroline Williams, Christa Campbell, Jared Demetri Luciano | Boll World Sales | Horror | |
| F E B R U A R Y | 6 | The Grand Budapest Hotel | Director: Wes Anderson; Cast: Ralph Fiennes, F. Murray Abraham, Mathieu Amalric, Adrien Brody, Willem Dafoe, Jeff Goldblum, Harvey Keitel, Jude Law, Bill Murray, Edward Norton, Saoirse Ronan, Jason Schwartzman, Léa Seydoux, Tilda Swinton, Tom Wilkinson, Owen Wilson, Tony Revolori | Fox Searchlight Pictures | Comedy | |
| F E B R U A R Y | 7 | Jack | Director: Edward Berger; Cast: Ivo Pietzcker | | Drama | |
| F E B R U A R Y | 7 | The Lamb | Director: Kutluğ Ataman; Cast: Güven Kiraç | | Drama | |
| F E B R U A R Y | 7 | The Monuments Men | Director: George Clooney; Cast: George Clooney, Matt Damon, Bill Murray, John Goodman, Jean Dujardin, Bob Balaban, Hugh Bonneville, Cate Blanchett | 20th Century Fox | War | |
| F E B R U A R Y | 8 | Beloved Sisters | Director: Dominik Graf; Cast: Hannah Herzsprung, Florian Stetter, Henriette Confurius | | Biography | |
| F E B R U A R Y | 8 | Land of Storms | Director: Ádám Császi; Cast: András Sütő, Ádám Varga, Sebastian Urzendowsky | TLA Releasing | Drama | |
| F E B R U A R Y | 8 | Stereo | Director: Maximilian Erlenwein; Cast: Jürgen Vogel, Moritz Bleibtreu | Wild Bunch | Thriller | |
| F E B R U A R Y | 9 | History of Fear | Director: Benjamín Naishtat; Cast: Jonathan Da Rosa | | Drama | |
| F E B R U A R Y | 9 | Pierrot Lunaire | Director: Bruce LaBruce; Cast: Susanne Sachsse, Luizo Vega, Maria Ivanenko | Die Lamb | Musical | |
| F E B R U A R Y | 9 | Stations of the Cross | Director: Dietrich Brüggemann; Cast: Hanns Zischler | | Drama | |
| F E B R U A R Y | 9 | Superegos | Director: Benjamin Heisenberg; Cast: André Wilms | | Drama | |
| F E B R U A R Y | 10 | A Long Way Down | Director: Pascal Chaumeil; Cast: Toni Collette, Pierce Brosnan, Aaron Paul, Imogen Poots | Lionsgate | Comedy | |
| F E B R U A R Y | 10 | Age of Cannibals | Director: Johannes Naber | Studio TV Film | Drama | |
| F E B R U A R Y | 10 | The Dark Valley | Director: Andreas Prochaska; Cast: Sam Riley | | Western | |
| F E B R U A R Y | 11 | Futuro Beach | Director: Karim Aïnouz; Cast: Wagner Moura, Clemens Schick, Jesuita Barbosa | California Filmes | Drama | |
| F E B R U A R Y | 11 | Inbetween Worlds | Director: Feo Aladag; Cast: Ronald Zehrfeld | | Drama | |
| F E B R U A R Y | 12 | Beauty and the Beast | Director: Christophe Gans; Cast: Vincent Cassel, Léa Seydoux, André Dussollier | Pathé | Fantasy, Romance | |
| F E B R U A R Y | 12 | Diplomacy | Director: Volker Schlöndorff; Cast: André Dussollier, Niels Arestrup | Gaumont | Historical; Drama | |
| F E B R U A R Y | 18 | Pompeii | Director: Paul W. S. Anderson; Cast: Kit Harington, Emily Browning, Carrie-Anne Moss, Adewale Akinnuoye-Agbaje, Jessica Lucas, Jared Harris, Kiefer Sutherland | Constantin Film | Historical; Disaster; Romance | |
| M A R C H | 6 | Fair Play | Director: Andrea Sedláčková; Cast: Vlastina Svátková | | Drama | |
| M A R C H | 6 | The Judgment | Director: Stephan Komandarev; Cast: Assen Blatechki | | Drama | |
| M A R C H | 27 | Amsterdam Express | Director: Fatmir Koçi; Cast: Blerim Destani, James Biberi, Natasha Goulden | Film and Music Entertainment | Drama | |
| M A Y | 15 | Mr. Turner | Director: Mike Leigh; Timothy Spall, Lesley Manville, Roger Ashton-Griffiths, Joshua McGuire, Dorothy Atkinson | Entertainment One | Drama; Biography | |
| M A Y | 15 | That Lovely Girl | Director: Keren Yedaya | | Drama | |
| M A Y | 16 | Amour Fou | Director: Jessica Hausner; Cast: Birte Schnöink, Christian Friedel, Stephan Grossmann | Coproduction Office | Comedy; Drama | |
| M A Y | 16 | Gett: The Trial of Viviane Amsalem | Directors: Ronit Elkabetz, Shlomi Elkabetz; Cast: Ronit Elkabetz, Menashe Noy, Sasson Gabai, Simon Abkarian | Les Films du Losange | Drama | |
| M A Y | 16 | Winter Sleep | Director: Nuri Bilge Ceylan; Cast: Haluk Bilginer, Demet Akbağ, Melisa Sözen, Tamer Levent, Nejat İşler | New Wave Films | Drama | |
| M A Y | 18 | Jauja | Director: Lisandro Alonso; Cast: Viggo Mortensen | NDM | Historical; Drama | |
| M A Y | 18 | The Wonders | Director: Alice Rohrwacher; Cast: Alba Rohrwacher, André Hennicke, Monica Bellucci | | Drama | |
| M A Y | 19 | Maps to the Stars | Director: David Cronenberg; Cast: Julianne Moore, Mia Wasikowska, John Cusack, Robert Pattinson | Entertainment One | Satire; Drama | |
| M A Y | 22 | Bridges of Sarajevo | Directors: Aida Begić, Leonardo Di Constanzo, Jean-Luc Godard, Kamen Kalev, Isild Le Besco, Sergei Loznitsa, Vincenzo Marra, Ursula Meier, Vladimir Perišić, Cristi Puiu, Marc Recha, Angela Schanelec, Teresa Villaverde | | Documentary | |
| M A Y | 23 | Clouds of Sils Maria | Director: Olivier Assayas; Cast: Juliette Binoche, Kristen Stewart, Chloë Grace Moretz | Les Films du Losange | Drama | |
| M A Y | 23 | White God | Director: Kornél Mundruczó; Cast: Zsófia Psotta | | Drama | |
| J U N E | 7 | Der Spalt | Director: Kim Schicklang; Cast: Marie Fischer, Folker Dücker, Dorothea Baltzer | Schöne Neue Medien | Drama; Thriller | |
| J U N E | 12 | Madame Bovary | Director: Sophie Barthes; Cast: Mia Wasikowska, Henry Lloyd-Hughes, Paul Giamatti, Ezra Miller, Rhys Ifans | 20th Century Fox | Drama | |

=== July–December ===
| Opening | | Title | Cast and crew | Studio | Genre(s) | Ref. |
|---|---|---|---|---|---|---|
| J U L Y | 2 | The Chambermaid Lynn | Director: Ingo Haeb; Cast: Vicky Krieps, Lena Lauzemis, Steffen Munster, Christian Aumer, Christine Schorn | Sutor Kolonko | Comedy; Horror | |
| J U L Y | 6 | Memories on Stone | Director: Shawkat Amin Korki; Cast: Hussein Hassan | | Drama | |
| J U L Y | 8 | Monument to Michael Jackson | Director: Darko Lungulov; Cast: Boris Milivojević | | Comedy | |
| J U L Y | 9 | Corn Island | Director: Giorgi Ovashvili; Cast: İlyas Salman | | Drama | |
| J U L Y | 9 | Corrections Class | Director: Ivan Tverdovskiy; Cast: Mariya Poezzhaeva, Filipp Avdeev | | Drama | |
| J U L Y | 20 | Veve | Director: Simon Mukali; Cast: Lowri Odhiambo, Emo Rugene, Lizz Njagah | | Drama | |
| A U G U S T | 6 | Mr. Kaplan | Director: Álvaro Brechner; Cast: Héctor Noguera | | Comedy | |
| A U G U S T | 9 | Tour de Force | Director: Christian Zübert; Cast: Florian David Fitz | | Drama | |
| A U G U S T | 11 | Men Who Save the World | Director: Liew Seng Tat; Cast: Wan Hanafi Su, Harun Salim Bachik, Soffi Jikan, Jalil Hamid, Azhan Rani | Everything Films | Comedy | |
| A U G U S T | 11 | Two Shots Fired | Director: Martín Rejtman; Cast: Manuela Martelli | | Drama | |
| A U G U S T | 15 | Hector and the Search for Happiness | Director: Peter Chelsom; Cast: Simon Pegg, Toni Collette, Rosamund Pike, Stellan Skarsgård, Jean Reno, Christopher Plummer | Koch Media | Comedy; Drama | |
| A U G U S T | 22 | Shockwave, Darkside | Director: Jay Weisman; Cast: Mei Melançon, Bill Sage, Sonequa Martin-Green, Rich Ceraulo, Alexander Cendese | | Science Fiction | |
| A U G U S T | 22 | The Prince | Director: Brian A. Miller; Cast: Jason Patric, Bruce Willis, John Cusack, Rain, Jessica Lowndes, Johnathon Schaech, Gia Mantegna, 50 Cent | Lionsgate | Crime; Thriller | |
| A U G U S T | 29 | She's Funny That Way | Director: Peter Bogdanovich; Cast: Owen Wilson, Imogen Poots, Kathryn Hahn, Will Forte, Rhys Ifans, Jennifer Aniston | Lionsgate Premiere | Comedy | |
| A U G U S T | 30 | The President | Director: Mohsen Makhmalbaf; Cast: Misha Gomiashvili, Dachi Orvelashvili | Makhmalbaf Film House | Drama | |
| A U G U S T | 30 | Three Hearts | Director: Benoît Jacquot; Cast: Benoît Poelvoorde, Charlotte Gainsbourg, Chiara Mastroianni, Catherine Deneuve | Wild Bunch | Drama | |
| A U G U S T | 31 | The Cut | Director: Fatih Akın; Cast: Tahar Rahim | | Drama | |
| S E P T E M B E R | 2 | A Pigeon Sat on a Branch Reflecting on Existence | Director: Roy Andersson; Cast: Nisse Vestblom, Holger Andersson | Roy Andersson Filmproduktion AB | Comedy; Drama | |
| S E P T E M B E R | 3 | Sivas | Director: Kaan Müjdeci; Cast: Dogan Izci | | Drama | |
| S E P T E M B E R | 4 | Maya the Bee | Director: Alexs Stadermann; Cast: Coco Jack Gillies, Kodi Smit-McPhee, Joel Franco, Richard Roxburgh, Justine Clarke, Jacki Weaver, Miriam Margolyes, Noah Taylor, Andy McPhee | Shout! Factory | Animation; Comedy; Adventure | |
| S E P T E M B E R | 4 | The Valley | Director: Ghassan Salhab; Cast: Carol Abboud | | Drama | |
| S E P T E M B E R | 5 | Big Game | Director: Jalmari Helander; Cast: Samuel L. Jackson, Onni Tommila, Felicity Huffman, Victor Garber, Ted Levine, Jim Broadbent, Ray Stevenson | Entertainment One | Action; Adventure | |
| S E P T E M B E R | 6 | Labyrinth of Lies | Director: Giulio Ricciarelli; Cast: Alexander Fehling | | Drama | |
| S E P T E M B E R | 6 | Who Am I | Director: Baran bo Odar; Cast: Tom Schilling, Elyas M'Barek | | Thriller | |
| S E P T E M B E R | 7 | 1001 Grams | Director: Bent Hamer; Cast: Ane Dahl Torp, Stein Winge, Per Christian Ellefsen | | Drama | |
| S E P T E M B E R | 7 | Meet Me in Montenegro | Director: Alex Holdridge; Cast: Rupert Friend, Linnea Saasen, Jennifer Ulrich, Alex Holdridge | The Orchard | Romance; Comedy | |
| S E P T E M B E R | 9 | Modris | Director: Juris Kursietis; Cast: Kristers Piksa | | Drama | |
| S E P T E M B E R | 25 | Phoenix | Director: Christian Petzold; Cast: Nina Hoss, Ronald Zehrfeld, Nina Kunzendorf, Michael Maertens | | Drama | |
| S E P T E M B E R | 25 | The Seventh Dwarf | Directors: Boris Aljinovic, Harald Siepermann; Cast: Peyton List, Norm MacDonald, Nina Hagen | Universal Pictures | Animation | |
| O C T O B E R | 9 | Northmen: A Viking Saga | Director: Claudio Fäh; Cast: Tom Hopper, Ryan Kwanten, Ken Duken, Charlie Murphy, Ed Skrein, Anatole Taubman, Leo Gregory, James Norton, Darrell D'Silva, Johan Hegg, Danny Keogh | The Salt Company | Historical; Action | |
| O C T O B E R | 10 | The Farewell Party | Directors: Tal Granit, Sharon Maymon; Cast: Ze'ev Revach | | Drama | |
| O C T O B E R | 16 | We Are Young. We Are Strong | Director: Burhan Qurbani; Cast: Devid Striesow | | Drama | |
| O C T O B E R | 17 | Love, Rosie | Director: Christian Ditter; Cast: Lily Collins, Sam Claflin, Tamsin Egerton, Suki Waterhouse, Jaime Winstone | Lionsgate; Based on Where Rainbows End by Cecelia Ahern | Drama; Comedy; Romance | |
| O C T O B E R | 23 | Tom Sawyer & Huckleberry Finn | Director: Jo Kastner; Cast: Joel Courtney, Jake T. Austin | VMI Worldwide | Comedy; Drama; Adventure | |
| N O V E M B E R | 27 | A Borrowed Identity | Director: Eran Riklis; Cast: Tawfeek Barhom | | Drama | |
| D E C E M B E R | 15 | Head Full of Honey | Director: Til Schweiger; Cast: Dieter Hallervorden, Emma Schweiger, Til Schweiger | | Drama | |

== Minor releases ==
| Title | Director | Release date | Genre |
|---|---|---|---|
| 2+2 | Thomas Ciulei | | Comedy |
| 3/4 | Maike Höhne | 26 September 2014 (Germany) | Drama |

== Notable deaths ==
| Month | Date | Name | Age | Nationality | Profession | Notable films |
|---|---|---|---|---|---|---|
| January | 19 | Gordon Hessler | 88 | German-English | Director, Producer, Screenwriter | The Oblong Box; The Girl in a Swing |
| April | 14 | Ingeborg von Kusserow | 95 | German-English | Actress | Captain Horatio Hornblower R.N.; Across the Bridge |
| May | 12 | Cornell Borchers | 89 | Lithuanian-German | Actress | The Big Lift; Never Say Goodbye |
| May | 29 | Karlheinz Böhm | 86 | German-Austrian | Actor | The Wonderful World of the Brothers Grimm; Peeping Tom |
| June | 26 | Wolf Koenig | 86 | German-Canadian | Director, Producer | Lonely Boy; City of Gold |
| July | 5 | Rosemary Murphy | 89 | German-American | Actress, Singer | To Kill a Mockingbird; Ben |
| July | 16 | Hans Funck | 61 | German | Film Editor | The Invasion; Diana |
| August | 19 | Tom Pevsner | 87 | German-English | Producer, Production Manager | James Bond; Dracula |
| September | 1 | Gottfried John | 72 | German | Actor | GoldenEye; Proof of Life |
| September | 11 | Joachim Fuchsberger | 87 | German | Actor | Mystery Submarine; The Face of Fu Manchu |
| November | 19 | Mike Nichols | 83 | German-American | Director, Producer, Screenwriter | The Graduate; Who's Afraid of Virginia Woolf? |
| December | 30 | Luise Rainer | 104 | German-English | Actress | The Great Ziegfeld; The Good Earth |

== See also ==
- 2014 in film
- 2014 in Germany
- Cinema of Germany
- List of German submissions for the Academy Award for Best Foreign Language Film
