= Ali Cook =

English magician and actor

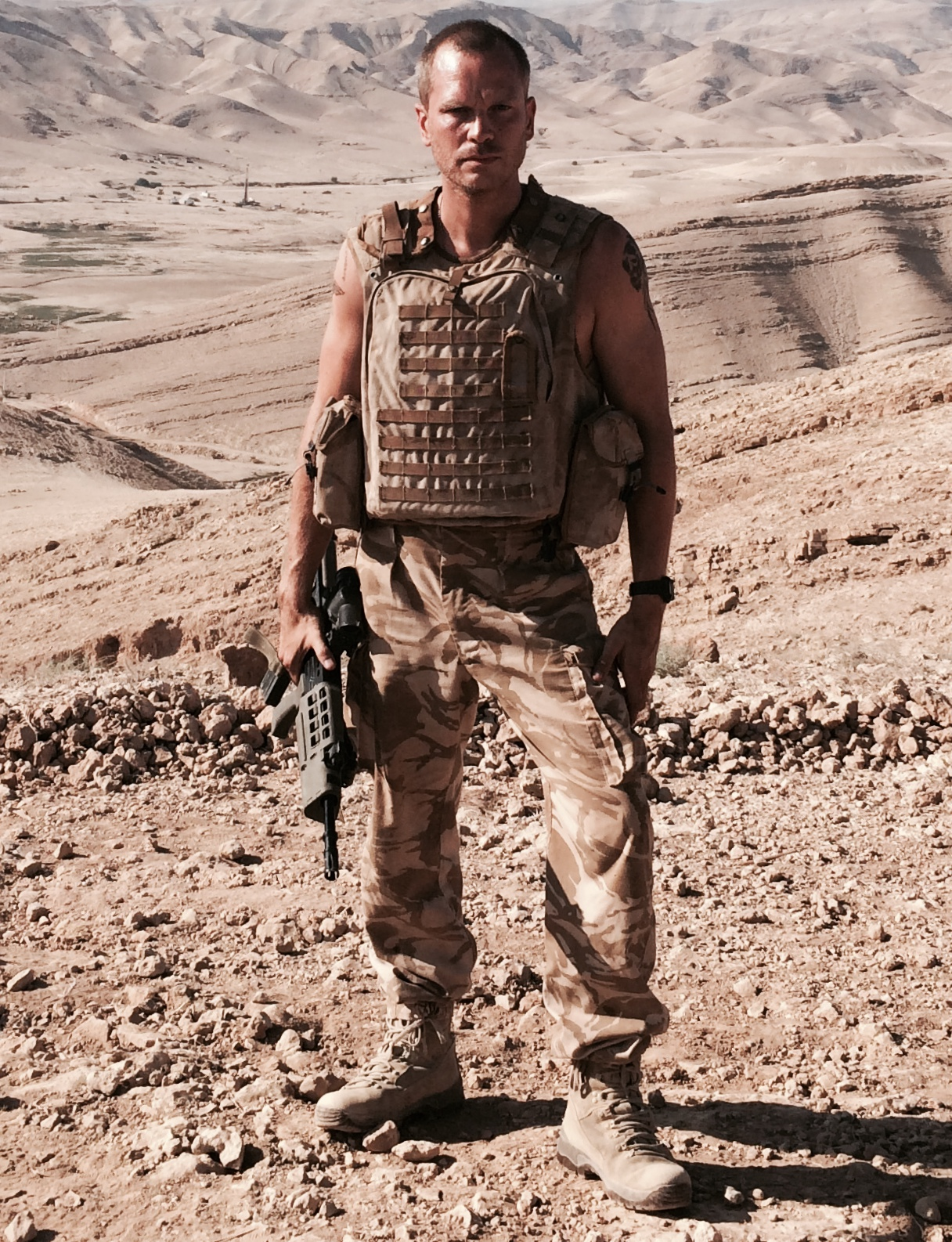
- Ali Cook as Sgt. Paul McMellon in Kajaki
- Born: Alistair Cook; Yorkshire, England
- Occupations: Actor; Comedian
- Website: official website

Ali Cook (also credited as Alistair Cook) is an English actor and comedian from Yorkshire. Cook played Sgt. Paul McMellon in the feature film Kajaki, which won the Producer of The Year Award at the 2015 British Independent Film Awards and was nominated for a British Academy of Film and Television Arts Award in 2015.

He recently wrote and acted in the short film The Cunning Man, winner of the Arri Alexa short film competition which was long listed for a BAFTA and has currently won over 30 awards.

== Early life and career ==
Cook's career started on the Channel 5 sketch series, The Jerry@Trick show with the alternative comedians Phil Nichol and Boothby Graffoe. Andrew Newman, then the head of comedy at Five, spotted Cook during tapings which lead to him writing and starring in seven of his own comedy and Magic series for Channel 4, Channel 5, and Sky1. His Channel 4 Series Dirty Tricks was nominated for a British Comedy Award and The Golden Rose of Montreux.

== Television career ==
Cook's acted in the Channel five sketch series Jerry@Trick Show before moving on to co-write and star in TV series, including The Golden Rose of Montreux nominated Monkey Magic (UK TV series), Psychic Secrets Revealed with Derren Brown for Channel 5 and the Secret World of Magic for Sky One. Cook was the star of Channel 4's British Comedy Award nominated, late night show Dirty Tricks. Cook starred in the first Penn & Teller: Fool Us (ITV) hosted by Jonathan Ross. In 2011 he performed his Houdini-style water torture cell escape on The Slammer (CBBC).

He has also starred in the France 2 series Le Plus Grand Cabaret du monde produced by Magic. Recent television credits include: Ragdoll for AMC, Mr Selfridge, the role of the villainous Patrick in multiple episodes of Emmerdale in 2016 and the German officer in the BBC's 2018 adaptation of Agatha Christie's The ABC Murders.

=== Television ===
Year	Title	Production company	Channel/Network
2002	The Jerry@trick Show	Ronin Entertainments	Channel 5
2002	Monkey Magic	Objective Productions	Channel 5
2003	Psychic	Objective Productions	Channel 5
2003	Monkey Magic Two	Objective Productions	Channel 5
2004	Secret World of Magic	Objective Productions	Sky One
2005	Dirty Tricks	Objective Productions	Channel 4
2010	Talk of the Terrace	-	ESPN
2011	Penn & Teller: Fool Us	September Films	ITV1
2011	The Slammer	-	CBBC
2011	Le Plus Grand Cabaret du monde	-	Magic, France 2
2013	Mr Selfridge	-	ITV1
2016	Emmerdale	-	ITV1 (multiple episodes)
2018	The ABC Murders	-	BBC 1
2021	Ragdoll	-	AMC

== Film ==
Cook portrayed Sgt. Paul "Spud" McMellon in 2014's Kajaki. The production won the Producer of The Year Award at the 2015 British Independent Film Awards and was nominated for a British Academy of Film and Television Arts Award in 2015.

Cook stars alongside Katherine Parkinson and Jay Pharoah in 2018's How To Fake A War, directed by Rudolph Herzog and produced by Film and Music Entertainment.

Other recent credits include: Twist for Sky Cinema, The Obscure Life of the Grand Duke of Corsica starring Timothy Spall, Muscle directed by Gerard Johnson, In the Cloud directed by Robert Scott Wildes for Sony Pictures, Once Upon a Time in London directed by Simon Rumley, and British Independent Film Awards nominated thriller Isolani.

In 2011 he appeared in Outside Bet, directed by Sacha Bennett, alongside Bob Hoskins, Phil Davis and Jenny Agutter. He has played the lead role in ten British short film dramas, most notably the psychotic character Greg in Andrew Saunder's and Stephen Frears' Striklem

In 2011, Cook was an executive producer on the feature film Dark Tide, starring Halle Berry.

=== Filmography ===
==== Feature films ====
Year	Title	Production company	Director
2005	Sahara	Paramount Pictures	Breck Eisner
2012	Outside Bet	Gateway Films	Sacha Bennett
2013	Get Lucky	Gateway Films	Sacha Bennett
2014	Peterman	Control Films	Mark Abraham
2014	Lost In Karastan	Film and Music Entertainment	Ben Hopkins
2014	Kajaki	Pukka Films	Paul Katis
2015	The Messenger	Gateway Films	David Blair
2016	The Call Up	Stigma Films	Charles Barker
2016	Isolani	Lola Pictures	Paul Wilson
2017	Once Upon a Time in London	Zebra Films	Simon Rumley
2017	In the Cloud	Sony Pictures	Robert Scott Wildes
2018	How To Fake A War	Film and Music Entertainment	Rudolph Herzog
2018	Muscle	Stigma Films	Gerard Johnson
2021	Twist	Sky Original	-
2021	The Obscure Life Of The Grand Duke Of Corsica	Camelot Films	-
2022	Prezidentka, Marlene	Film Productions	-

==== Short films ====
- 2019 The Cunning Man, Harvest Films
- 2025 The Pearl Comb, Dunninger Films

== Theatre ==
Cook has written and performed three critically acclaimed sell-out Edinburgh solo shows: A Touch of Vegas (2008), Pieces of Strange (2010), and Principles and Deceptions (2011)

=== Stage ===
Year	Type	Show/Event Name	Production company	Venue
2015	Stage	Impossible: London's Magic Spectacular	Jamie Hendry Productions	Noël Coward Theatre, London
2011	Stage	One man show, Principles and Deceptions	-	Gilded Balloon, Edinburgh
2010	Stage	One man show, Pieces of Strange	-	Gilded Balloon, Edinburgh
2008	Stage	One man show, A Touch of Vegas	-	Gilded Balloon, Edinburgh
