= Giorgos Karnavas =

Greek film producer

- Born: 1973 (age 52–53); Athens, Greece
- Occupation: Film producer
- Years active: 2012–present

Giorgos Karnavas is a Greek film producer and music composer. He is the co-founder of Heretic, an Athens-based film production and international sales company focused on European arthouse cinema and international co-productions. He is best known for producing Triangle of Sadness, which won the Palme d’Or at the Cannes Film Festival and received multiple Academy Award nominations.

He has been a member of the board of the European Film Academy since 2023 and is a voting member of the Academy of Motion Picture Arts and Sciences. He is also the founder and producer of the Synch Festival, an electronic music and arts festival that received recognition as Best European Electronic Music Festival in 2006.

== Early life and education ==
Karnavas was born in 1973 in Athens, Greece. He studied Political Science at the National and Kapodistrian University of Athens and Finance at the Hellenic Management Association, while also taking courses in screenwriting.

== Career ==
In 1998, Karnavas joined Stefi Productions, where he later became general manager and head of events, a position he held from 2007 until September 2012. During his career in live events, he promoted concerts and performances by artists including Pet Shop Boys, Antony and the Johnsons, Nine Inch Nails, Einstürzende Neubauten, and Róisín Murphy.

In 2011, Karnavas entered the film industry as a producer after collaborating with Greek filmmaker Argyris Papadimitropoulos on Wasted Youth, a feature film inspired by the killing of Alexandros Grigoropoulos and the subsequent Greek riots of 2008. The film premiered as the opening title of the International Film Festival Rotterdam.

In 2013, Karnavas co-founded production company Heretic with producer Konstantinos Kontovrakis. In the same year, he was selected by European Film Promotion (EFP) as Greece’s participant in the Producers on the Move program, held annually during the Cannes Film Festival to support emerging European producers and encourage international co-production.

In 2018, Karnavas was awarded the Eurimages Co-Production Award alongside his Heretic partner Kontovrakis, marking the first time a Greek production company received the award. Presented by the Council of Europe’s film fund Eurimages during the European Film Awards ceremony on December 15 in Seville, the award recognizes outstanding achievement in European co-production. It acknowledged their collaboration on films such as Wasted Youth, as well as Son of Sofia, which premiered at the Tribeca Film Festival, and The Harvesters, which screened in the Un Certain Regard section at the Cannes Film Festival.

In December 2019, it was announced that Heretic boarded Ruben Östlund's English-language satire Triangle of Sadness. Karnavas was reported to be attached as local executive producer for the Greek portion of the shoot, which was planned to take place across multiple locations in the Aegean and Ionian Seas in mid-2020.

In May 2020, Karnavas was involved in multiple European co-productions, including Triangle of Sadness, as well as Mediterraneo and A House in Jerusalem. In November 2020, amid Greece's second national lockdown, Karnavas completed the production on Triangle of Sadness, which was filming on the island of Evia and in the Ionian Sea under special government permits and strict health protocols. Production had previously been delayed for several months due to the pandemic. That same month, he also completed shooting on Mediterraneo, a Spanish-Greek co-production addressing the refugee crisis. In 2021, Karnavas co-produced Semaine de la Critique winner Feathers.

In 2022, films co-produced by Karnavas were screened at San Sebastián International Film Festival, where Runner won the Jury Prize and I Have Electric Dreams was awarded Best Film in the Horizontes Latinos section. In the same year, projects in Heretics' co-production slate included Inside, starring Willem Dafoe, the musical feature Greatest Days (2023), and Anthony Chen's English-language debut Drift.

In 2023, Karnavas produced Inside starring Willem Dafoe, executive produced Angela Schanelec's Music, which won the Silver Bear at the Berlin International Film Festival, and How to Have Sex, which premiered in Un Certain Regard at the Cannes Film Festival and won the section’s top prize.

In 2024, Karnavas was announced as a member of the board of the European Film Academy representing the territories of Greece, Georgia, Israel, Cyprus & Armenia.

In 2025, Karnavas produced The Birthday Party by Miguel Angel Jimenez which he co-wrote, Sacrifice and Hot Milk which premiered in Competition in 75th Berlin International Film Festival and was released by IFC.

In June 2025, Karnavas co-founded the music group Gammagamma with musician Prins Obi. The group released its debut album Katholou Techni (No Art at All) through Minos EMI, and their single Avrio Vrady was accompanied by a music video directed by Vasilis Katsoupis and starring actor Willem Dafoe, shot in Athens.

== Filmography ==
Year	Film	Role
2011	Wasted Youth	Producer
2012	Boy Eating the Bird’s Food	Producer
2013	The Eternal Return of Antonis Paraskevas	Producer
2016	My Friend Larry Gus	Producer
2017	The Surface of Things	Co-producer
2017	Son of Sofia	Producer
2018	Still River	Producer
2018	The Harvesters	Co-producer
2019	Window to the Sea	Producer
2020	Kala azar	Co-producer
2021	Magnetic Fields	Executive producer
2021	Töchter	Co-producer
2021	Mediterráneo: The Law of the Sea	Co-producer
2021	Feathers	Co-producer
2022	Along the Way	Co-producer
2022	Triangle of Sadness	Executive producer
2023	Do Not Expect Too Much from the End of the World	Associate producer
2023	Greatest Days	Executive producer
2023	How to Have Sex	Executive producer
2023	Music	Executive producer
2023	Inside	Producer
2023	A House in Jerusalem	Producer
2023	Drift	Co-producer
2024	The Return	Executive producer
2024	Maria	Co-producer
2024	Kyuka: Before Summer’s End	Producer
2024	Swimming Home	Producer
2025	Sacrifice	Producer
2025	Novak	Producer
2025	The Birthday Party	Producer
2025	Hot Milk	Producer
2026	Dust	Co-producer
2026	Our Share of Sand	Co-producer

== Personal life ==
Karnavas resides in Athens, Greece.
