= Mike Downey =

Mike Downey may refer to:

- Mike Downey (columnist) (1951–2024), American newspaper columnist
- Mike Downey (producer), 21st century Irish-British film producer

== See also ==
- Mike Downie (fl. 1990s–2020s), Canadian documentary filmmaker
