= Inside (2023 film) =

Psychological thriller film by Vasilis Katsoupis

- Theatrical release poster
- Directed by: Vasilis Katsoupis
- Screenplay by: Ben Hopkins
- Story by: Vasilis Katsoupis
- Produced by: Giorgos Karnavas; Marcos Kantis; Dries Phlypo
- Starring: Willem Dafoe; Gene Bervoets; Eliza Stuyck
- Cinematography: Steve Annis
- Edited by: Lambis Haralambidis
- Music by: Frederik van de Moortel
- Production companies: Heretic; Schiwago Film; A Private View
- Distributed by: Sony Pictures Belgium (Belgium); SquareOne Entertainment (Germany); Tulip Entertainment (Greece); Focus Features Universal Pictures (International)
- Release dates: 20 February 2023 (Berlinale); 10 March 2023 (Greece); 15 March 2023 (Belgium); 16 March 2023 (Germany)
- Running time: 105 minutes
- Countries: Belgium; Germany; Greece; United Kingdom
- Language: English
- Box office: $1 million

Inside is a 2023 psychological thriller film written by Ben Hopkins and directed by Vasilis Katsoupis in his feature directorial debut. It follows an art thief (Willem Dafoe) who is trapped inside a luxury penthouse, slowly losing his grip on reality.

Inside had its world premiere at the 73rd Berlin International Film Festival on 20 February 2023. It was released theatrically in Greece on 10 March 2023 by Tulip Entertainment, in Belgium on 15 March 2023 by Sony Pictures Belgium, and in Germany on 16 March 2023 by SquareOne Entertainment.

== Plot ==
Nemo, an art thief, tells a story of his childhood, in which a teacher asked him to choose three things to save in a house fire. Rather than his family, Nemo selected his cat, an AC/DC record, and his sketchbook. He reflects that the cat died and he lent the album to an acquaintance who did not return it, but he still has the sketchbook, saying "art is for keeps".

In the present day, disguised as a handyman, Nemo breaks into the Manhattan high-rise penthouse of a wealthy art collector in order to steal three works by Egon Schiele, but is unable to find Schiele's self-portrait. His attempt to leave sets off the security system and seals the apartment, and his contacts abandon him; his attempts to escape prove futile. A broken thermostat renders the penthouse too hot and then too cold, and Nemo struggles with a lack of food and water, save for timed sprinklers in an indoor garden. Following Nemo's entry through bird netting over the apartment's patio, a pigeon becomes trapped, starves, and dies while Nemo watches, eventually decomposing completely.

As weeks or months pass, Nemo goes hungry and suffers injuries as a result of his escape attempts, which focus on constructing an enormous scaffold from furniture to reach a skylight. He makes gradual progress in disassembling the frame around the skylight with tools he constructs from furniture. He develops an obsession with a young housekeeper, dubbed "Jasmine", whom he watches via a security camera feed that plays on the apartment television. In maddening frustration, she is right outside the front door on more than one occasion, but she does not hear him banging and yelling for her to open it, because she is wearing earphones while running the vacuum.

Nemo discovers a hidden passage in a closet that leads to a room containing the Schiele self-portrait and a collation of The Marriage of Heaven and Hell. Desperate, Nemo eats fish from the art collector's aquarium and dog food, eventually suffering from tooth decay and intermittent hallucinations. While removing bolts from the skylight, he falls to the ground and breaks his leg. He constructs a splint, but his health and sanity continue to deteriorate along with the apartment. Over time, he studies the apartment's art, creates his own artwork, and makes intricate drawings on the walls.

Nemo sets off a smoke alarm in an attempt to get help, flooding the penthouse in the process but attracting no outside attention. He leaves the art collector a note written on the walls, reiterating the story from his childhood and apologising for breaking into and destroying his home, but stating that it may have been necessary as "there is no creation without destruction". Nemo concludes the apology by saying that he has saved three pieces of art.

Chanting, Nemo makes one last attempt to escape. The film ends with the skylight sconce falling to the floor, and then a still view of the enormous scaffolding and the now-open skylight. A shadow can be seen flickering in the skylight.

== Cast ==
- Willem Dafoe as Nemo
- Gene Bervoets as owner
- Eliza Stuyck as Jasmine

== Production ==
About five years before the film was released, producer Giorgos Karnavas contacted Ben Hopkins, saying that he was looking for a writer to work with director Vasilis Katsoupis on a film to be set in a high-rise penthouse.

The film was shot in chronological order, which director Vasilis Katsoupis likened to filming a documentary.

Principal photography wrapped up on 1 June 2021, after seven weeks of filming at Cologne's MMC TV & Film Studios.

== Release ==
The film had its world premiere at the 73rd Berlin International Film Festival on 20 February 2023. It was released theatrically in Greece on 10 March 2023 by Tulip Entertainment, in Belgium on 15 March 2023 by Sony Pictures Belgium, in Germany on 16 March 2023 by SquareOne Entertainment, and in the United States on 17 March 2023 by Focus Features.

== Reception ==
On the review aggregator website Rotten Tomatoes, 62% of 117 critics' reviews are positive, with an average rating of 6.0/10. The website's consensus reads: "Inside might be a one-note drama that verges on an endurance test, but it does have Willem Dafoe going for it, which is nice."

Metacritic, which uses a weighted average, assigned the film a score of 53 out of 100, based on 30 critics, indicating "mixed or average" reviews.
