= Dust (2026 film) =

- Directed by: Anke Blondé
- Screenplay by: Angelo Tijssens
- Produced by: Dries Phlypo; James Watson; Mikko Makela; Joanna Szymanska; Krystyna Kantor; Giorgos Karnavas
- Starring: Arieh Worthalter; Jan Hammenecker; Thibaud Dooms; Fania Sorel; Anthony Welsh
- Cinematography: Frank van den Eeden
- Edited by: David Verdurme; Lambis Charalampidis
- Music by: Andrea Balency-Béarn
- Production companies: A Private View; Shipsboy; Heretic; Bêtes Sauvages
- Distributed by: Kinepolis Film Distribution (Belgium)
- Release date: February 15, 2026 (Berlinale)
- Running time: 115 minutes
- Countries: Belgium; Poland; Greece; United Kingdom
- Languages: Dutch; English; French

Dust is a 2026 drama film directed by Anke Blondé from a screenplay by Angelo Tijssens. It stars Arieh Worthalter, Jan Hammenecker, Thibaud Dooms, Fania Sorel, and Anthony Welsh.

The film premiered at the main competition of the 76th Berlin International Film Festival on 15 February 2026, where it was nominated for the Golden Bear.

== Cast ==
- Arieh Worthalter as Geert
- Jan Hammenecker as Luc
- Thibaud Dooms as Kenneth
- Fania Sorel as Alma
- Anthony Welsh as Aaron

== Production ==
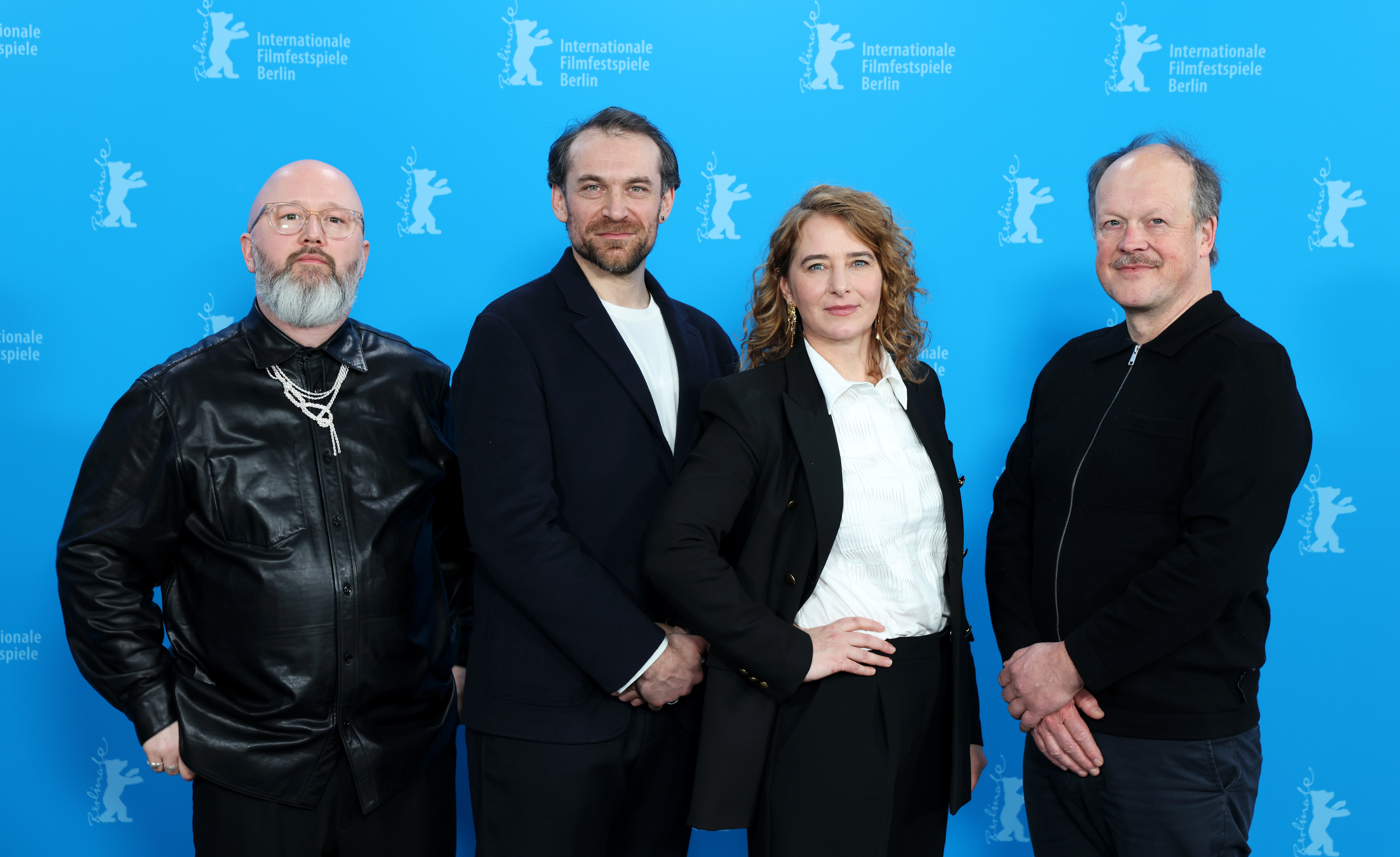
Angelo Tijssens, Arieh Worthalter, Anke Blondé and Jan Hammenecker at the 76th Berlin International Film Festival

Principal photography began in March 2025, on a drama film directed by Anke Blondé from a screenplay by Angelo Tijssens, and starring Arieh Worthalter, Jan Hammenecker, Thibaud Dooms, Fania Sorel, and Anthony Welsh.

== Release ==
Dust premiered at the main competition of the 76th Berlin International Film Festival on 15 February 2026, where it was nominated for the Golden Bear.

== Accolades ==
Award	Date of ceremony	Category	Recipient(s)	Result	Ref.
Teddy Award	February 20, 2026	Best Feature Film	Anke Blondé	Nominated	
