= Simon Magus (film) =

1999 British film by Ben Hopkins

- Directed by: Ben Hopkins
- Written by: Rob Cheek; Ben Hopkins
- Produced by: Robert Jones
- Starring: Stuart Townsend; Noah Taylor; Rutger Hauer; Embeth Davidtz; Sean McGinley; Ian Holm
- Cinematography: Nicholas D. Knowland
- Edited by: Alan Levy
- Music by: Deborah Mollison
- Distributed by: FilmFour
- Release date: 17 February 1999
- Running time: 101 minutes
- Country: United Kingdom
- Language: English

Simon Magus is a 1999 British historical mystery drama film directed by Ben Hopkins and starring Noah Taylor and Stuart Townsend. It was entered into the 49th Berlin International Film Festival.

== Background ==
The film is named for the village fool Simon (Noah Taylor), who is in turn named for the 1st century magician Simon Magus.

== Plot ==
In 19th century Poland, a Jew named Dovid Bendel (Stuart Townsend) tries to revive his dwindling shtetl village by building a railway station next to it. The squire (Rutger Hauer) agrees to provide the land, on the condition that Dovid will read his poetry. A cunning business man (Sean McGinley) is also interested in the land and he tries to compete using money and threats. Through this all wanders the outcast Simon (Noah Taylor), a man rumoured to have magical powers.

== Cast ==
- Stuart Townsend as Dovid Bendel
- Noah Taylor as Simon Magus
- Rutger Hauer as Count Albrecht
- Embeth Davidtz as Leah
- Sean McGinley as Hase
- Ian Holm as Sirius/Boris/Head
- Terence Rigby as Bratislav
- Amanda Ryan as Sarah
- David de Keyser as Rabbi
- Toby Jones as Buchholtz
- Kathryn Hunter as Grandmother
- Walter Sparrow as Benjamin
- Jean Anderson as Roise
