= Feathers (2021 film) =

2021 film

- Directed by: Omar El Zohairy
- Written by: Ahmad Amer Omar El Zohairy
- Produced by: Juliette Lepoutre, Pierre Menahem, Mohamed Hefzy, Derk-Jan Warrink, Koji Nelissen, Giorgos Karnavas, Konstantinos Kontovrakis, Verona Meier, Daniel Ziskind
- Edited by: Hisham Saqr
- Release date: 13 July 2021 (CFF)
- Running time: 112 minutes
- Country: Egypt
- Language: Egyptian Arabic

Feathers (Arabic: ريش) is a 2021 Egyptian comedy-drama film directed by Omar El Zohairy.

== Plot ==
A passive mother who dedicates her life to her husband and children. Stuck in daily, repetitive, mundane chores, she has made herself as little as she possibly could. When a magic trick goes wrong at her 4-year-old son’s birthday party, an avalanche of coincidental absurdities befalls the family. The magician turns her husband, the authoritarian father, into a chicken. The mother is now forced to come to the fore and take care of the family while moving heaven and earth to bring her husband back. As she tries to survive, she goes through a rough and absurd transformation.

== Starring ==
- Samy Bassouny
- Fady Mina Fawzy
- Demyana Nassar
- Abo Sefen Nabil Wesa
- Mohamed Abdel Hady
