= Under the Stars (2001 film) =

2001 film

- Directed by: Christos Georgiou
- Written by: Christos Georgiou
- Produced by: Antigone Gavriatopoulou; George Lykiardopoulos; Pantelis Mitropoulos, Panos Papahadzis; Sam Taylor
- Starring: Mirto Alikaki, Akis Sakellariou
- Cinematography: Roman Osin
- Edited by: Annabel Ware
- Music by: George Hadjineophytou
- Distributed by: British Screen Finance Ltd. Cyprus Film Advisory Board; Film and Music Entertainment; Greek Film Centre; Lumiere Productions; Lychnari Productions; Mass Productions; Media; Prooptiki; Wave Pictures
- Release date: 15 November 2001
- Running time: 87 minutes
- Countries: Greece; Cyprus; United Kingdom
- Languages: Greek; Turkish

Under the Stars is a 2001 film set in Cyprus.

== Cast ==
- Mirto Alikaki as Foivi
- Akis Sakellariou as Loukas
- Stella Fyrogeni as Loukas' Mother
- Ahilleas Grammatikopoulos as Foivi's Father
- Marinos Hadjivassiliou as Panikos
- Antonis Katsaris as Actor
- Andros Kritikos as Uncle Nikos
- Neoklis Neokleous as Loukas' father
- Stelios Onoufriou as Lukas
- Nefeli Papadaki as Phoebe
- Christina Paulidou as Foivi's Mother
- Sotos Stavrakis as Alexis

== Release ==
Under the Stars was released in Greece on 15 November 2001 at the Thessaloniki International Film Festival; the Netherlands on 31 January 2001 at the International Film Festival Rotterdam; Serbia on 3 February 2002 at the Belgrade Film Festival; the United Kingdom on 3 July 2002 at the Commonwealth Film Festival; and Ireland on 17 February 2004 at the Dublin Film Festival.

== Awards ==
- Audience Award, Commonwealth Film Festival.
- Montreal First Film Prize, Montreal World Film Festival.
- Nominated Golden Alexander, Thessaloniki Film Festival.
