= No One Thinks of Greenland =

2001 novel by John Griesemer

- Author: John Griesemer
- Language: English
- Genre: Political novel, war novel
- Publisher: Picador
- Publication date: May 2001
- Publication place: United States
- Media type: Print (Hardcover, Paperback)
- Pages: 332
- ISBN: 978-0-312-27457-3
- OCLC: 45888863

No One Thinks Of Greenland is a May 2001 novel by John Griesemer, upon which the film Guy X was based.

== Plot summary ==
The book is set after the Korean War. The novel follows the misadventures of the character Rudy Spruance who has been mistaken for another soldier and inadvertently assigned to Greenland.

== Critical reception ==
According to Publishers Weekly, Rudy's struggle in the novel "is a compelling one, as post–Korea and Vietnam revelations make the conspiracies imagined here near-plausible."
