= The Chelsea Cowboy =

Cancelled British film project

- Directed by: Ben Cookson
- Written by: Leon Butler
- Produced by: Idris Elba; Victor Glynn; James Ireland; Camilla Storey; Alex Pettyfer
- Starring: Alex Pettyfer; Poppy Delevingne; Lovi Poe; Charlie Creed-Miles
- Production companies: Filmojy.com and with Black Hangar Studios and Studio
- Distributed by: Orwo Distribution
- Running time: 97 minutes
- Country: United Kingdom
- Language: English

The Chelsea Cowboy was a planned British gangster biopic, to be directed by Ben Cookson and with Alex Pettyfer, Poppy Delevingne, Lovi Poe, and Charlie Creed-Miles attached in starring roles. Originally announced in 2021, with a 2022 release, the production company ran into financial problems before filming began; despite a new production company taking on the project, as of December 2025 the film has not been released in any format.

== Plot ==
The film will follow the rise and fall of London gangster, bodyguard, actor and underworld hard-man John Bindon, who despite having a successful acting career and passionate romantic liaisons with various members of high society, even socialising with Princess Margaret, but was not able to leave his criminal past behind.

== Cast ==
- Alex Pettyfer as John Bindon
- Poppy Delevingne as Vicki Hodge
- Sadie Frost as Cissy Bindon
- Charlie Creed-Miles as Sir John Hodge
- Charlotte Hope will play Sandra
- Lovi Poe as legendary blues singer Dana Gillespie
- Ben Drew as Roy Dennis
- Charley Palmer Rothwell as James Fox
- Tamer Hassan as Salim
- Warren Brown as Priddle
- Bronson Webb as John 'Smudge' Gillette
- George Blagden as Terence Stamp
- Clara Paget as Wendy Hodge
- Sadie Newman as Nina
- Ed Birch as Alan Stanton
- Jojo Macari as George Wright

== Production ==
Dark Dreams Entertainment, Life Begins Film Ltd, GCB Films, and Tell Me A Storey Productions are credited as producing the project.

== Funding ==
The production was halted when Life Begins Film Ltd, ran out of funding before filming was completed. The administrators, ReSolve Advisory, later sold all rights, materials and equipment relating to full-length feature film, after a corporate restructure of the team following advice from Penningtons Manches Cooper in 2022. The acquisition of the movie by Heracles Productions Limited, would mean production could continue to complete the film for release sometime in 2023.

The film was listed as being in post-production in June 2023.

As of November 2026, the film has not been released.
