= Clara Paget =

English actress and model (born 1988)

Lady Clara Paget
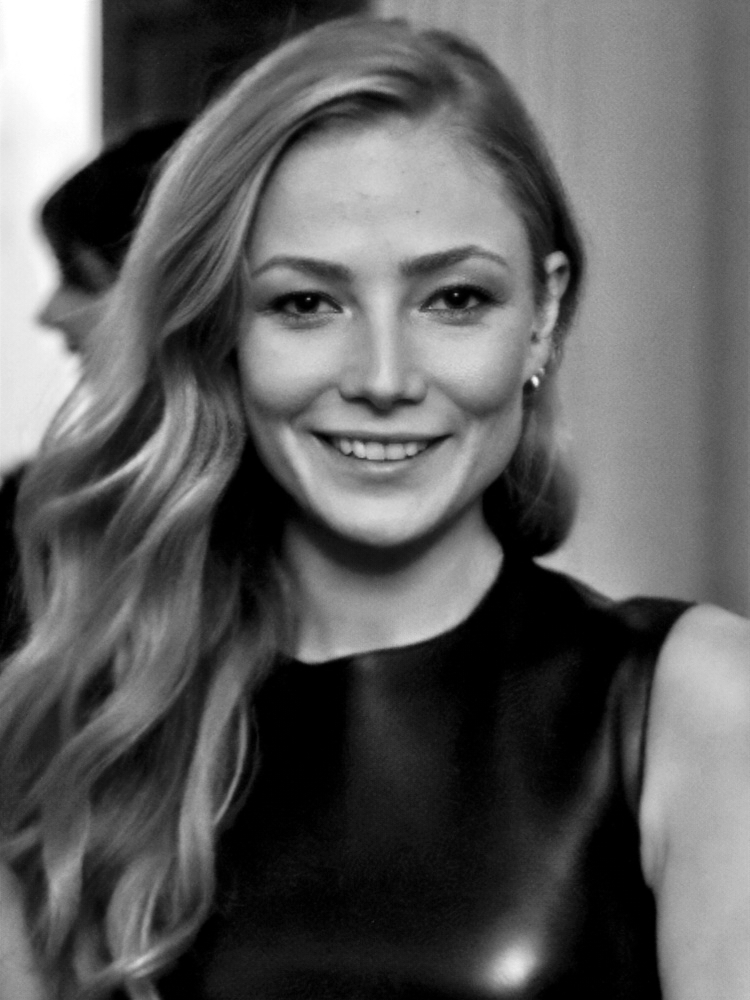
- Paget at Vogue London Fashion Week reception at Winfield House, September 2014
- Born: Clara Elizabeth Iris Paget; 12 September 1988 (age 38); London, England
- Occupation: Actress
- Years active: 2009-present
- Spouse: Oscar Tuttiett (m. 2021)
- Children: 2
- Parent: Charles Paget, 8th Marquess of Anglesey

Lady Clara Elizabeth Iris Paget (born 12 September 1988) is an English actress and model known for her roles in films St Trinian's 2: The Legend of Fritton's Gold and Fast & Furious 6, and her role as Anne Bonny in the television series Black Sails.

== Biography ==
Paget was born to an aristocratic father, Charles Paget, 8th Marquess of Anglesey, and Georgeanne Elliott Downes, who worked as a writer and painter.

In July 2021, Paget married Oscar Tuttiett, a concert and music festival producer and promoter. They were dating since May 2010. They have two sons.

During the years of 2014 to 2017, the television series Black Sails was filmed in South Africa, and Paget received praise for her role as Anne Bonny, a fictionalised representation of the historical female pirate.

Paget worked as a model for fashion houses such as for Burberry during 2016.

Paget is involved with the charity "Project 0".

== Filmography ==
Key
†	Denotes films that have not yet been released

Film roles
Year	Title	Role	Notes
2009	St Trinian's 2: The Legend of Fritton's Gold	Bella	
2011	One Day	Cocktail Waitress	
2011	Johnny English Reborn	Waitress	
2013	Fast & Furious 6	Vegh	
2013	Albert Camus: The Sea Close By	Model	Short film
2014	Acid Girls	Lia	
2021	The Lost Blonde:The Veronica Lake story	Veronica Lake	
2022	House Red	Natalie	
2025	The Pearl Comb	The Mermaid	Short film
2026	Madfabulous	Mabel	
TBA	The Chelsea Cowboy †	Wendy Hodge	Post-production

== Television ==
Television roles
Year	Title	Role	Notes
2011	Midsomer Murders	Charlotte Cameron	Episode: "Death in the Slow Lane"
2011	Little Crackers	Linda	Episode: "Barbara Windsor's Little Cracker: My First Brassiere"
2014–2017	Black Sails	Anne Bonny	Main role
2019	Strike Back: Revolution	Zoe Davis	Episode 1
2025	Too Much	Georgia-Peach	Guest star, series 1, episode 8: "One Wedding and a Sex Pest"

== See also ==
- Marquess of Anglesey
