= Helena Carrión =

Spanish actress

Helena Carrión is a Spanish actress. She has appeared in films such as Marujas asesinas (2001), La novia de Lázaro (2002), Crimen Ferpecto (2004), Entre vivir y soñar (2004), La caja Kovak (2005), La habitación de Fermat (2007), ¡Mano muerta llama a la puerta! (TV) (2008), Rivales (2008) and Proyecto Dos (2008).
