= Our Share of Sand =

2026 drama film by Shalini Adnani

- International teaser poster
- Directed by: Shalini Adnani
- Written by: Shalini Adnani
- Produced by: Sara Bonakdar; Alan McAlex; Balthazar de Ganay; Giorgos Karnavas; Michael Graf
- Starring: Maya Mehta; Mohammed Zeeshan Ayyub; Ellora Torchia; Krish Raj More; Ravi Ranjan Patil; Jyoti Dogra
- Cinematography: Adric Watson
- Edited by: Anna Meller
- Music by: Ted Regklis; Sarathy Korwar
- Production companies: Fifth Mirror Pictures; Suitable Pictures; Heretic
- Release date: 5 September 2026 (Venice)
- Running time: 95 minutes
- Countries: United Kingdom; India; Greece
- Languages: Hindi; English; Marathi

Our Share of Sand is a 2026 drama film written and directed by Shalini Adnani, in her feature directorial debut. A co-production of the United Kingdom, India and Greece, it stars Maya Mehta, Mohammed Zeeshan Ayyub, Ellora Torchia, Krish Raj More, Ravi Ranjan Patil, and Jyoti Dogra.

The film had its world premiere in competition in the International Critics' Week section of the 83rd Venice International Film Festival on 5 September 2026, where it won the section's Audience Award.

== Premise ==
Twelve-year-old Maya returns to rural India and learns her father is involved in illegal sand mining. After a terrible accident connected to his business, Maya faces pressure to protect him. Struggling between loyalty and conscience, she uncovers hidden exploitation and wrongdoing in her family’s past.

== Cast ==
- Maya Mehta as Maya
- Mohammed Zeeshan Ayyub as Rohan Mirani
- Ellora Torchia as Priti Mirani
- Krish Raj More as Kiran
- Ravi Ranjan Patil as Dadya
- Jyoti Dogra as Arti Mirani

== Production ==
The project was selected for the 'Great 8' Showcase, an online initiative curated by the British Film Institute and the British Council, at the Marché du Film market that took place during the 79th Cannes Film Festival.

The film marks the feature directorial debut of London-based Chilean-Indian filmmaker Shalini Adnani, who also wrote the screenplay. It is produced by Sara Bonakdar for Fifth Mirror Pictures alongside Alan McAlex for Suitable Pictures, Balthazar de Ganay, Giorgos Karnavas for Heretic. The project received backing from the British Film Institute, and Film4 Productions.

== Release ==
Our Share of Sand premiered at the 2026 Venice International Film Festival on 5 September 2026. It was screened in TIFF's Market under Market Screening programme at the 2026 Toronto International Film Festival on 10 September 2026.

It was screened in NOW/FUTURE section of the Zurich Film Festival on 26 September 2026.

It also competed in the First Feature Competition at the 2026 BFI London Film Festival on 10 October 2026, and in Stockholm Competition at the 2026 Stockholm International Film Festival on 12 November 2026.

== Reception ==
=== Critical response ===
Reviewing at Venice International Film Festival for Cineuropa, Fabien Lemercier giving positive review praised Shalini Adnani's ability to communicate emotion through subtle, non-verbal details, as well as the film's broader examination of the destructive effects of economic growth and the moral compromises associated with it. He observed that the film raises questions about the value of human life and described the film as an accomplished debut. Lemercier concluded that the film showed the promise of a filmmaker whose talent was only beginning to fully emerge.

=== Accolades ===
Award	Date of ceremony	Category	Recipient(s)	Result	Ref.
Venice Film Festival	12 September 2026	Venice International Critics' Week – Grand Prize	Shalini Adnani	Nominated	
Venice Film Festival	12 September 2026	Venice International Critics' Week – Audience Award	Our Share of Sand	Won	
Venice Film Festival	12 September 2026	Authors under 40 Award dedicated to Valentina Pedicini: Special Mention for Direction and Screenplay	Shalini Adnani	Won	
BFI London Film Festival	18 October 2026	Sutherland Award	Shalini Adnani	Nominated	
Asia Pacific Screen Awards	30 October 2026	Best Youth Film	Our Share of Sand	Nominated	
