= John Griesemer =

American author, journalist, and actor (born 1947)

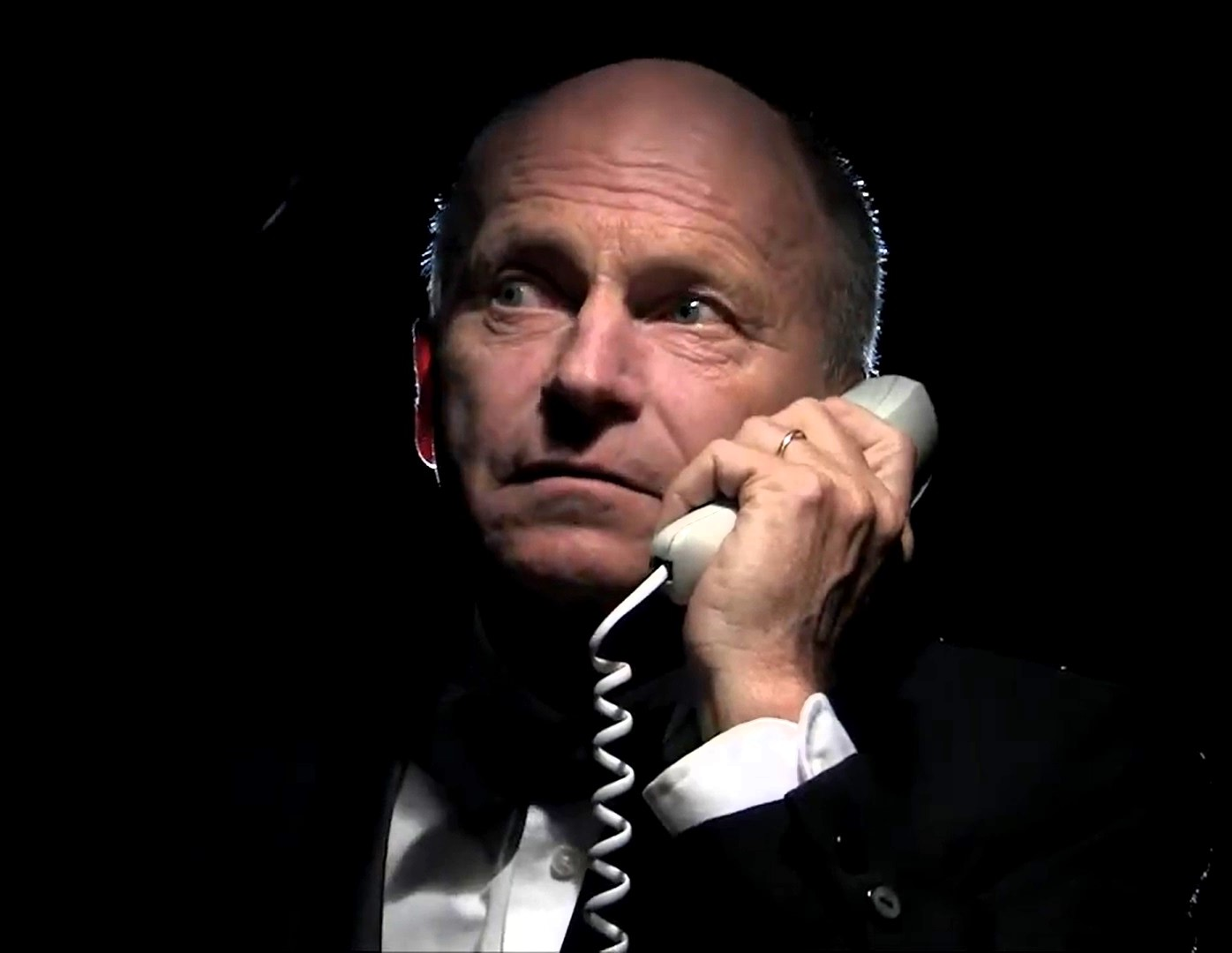
- Griesemer in Dead Drop, 2013 short film
- Born: December 5, 1947 (age 78); Elizabeth, New Jersey, U.S.
- Education: Pingry School; Dickinson College
- Occupations: Author; journalist; actor
- Spouse: Faith Catlin
- Children: 2
- Writing career
- Notable work: No One Thinks of Greenland (2003)

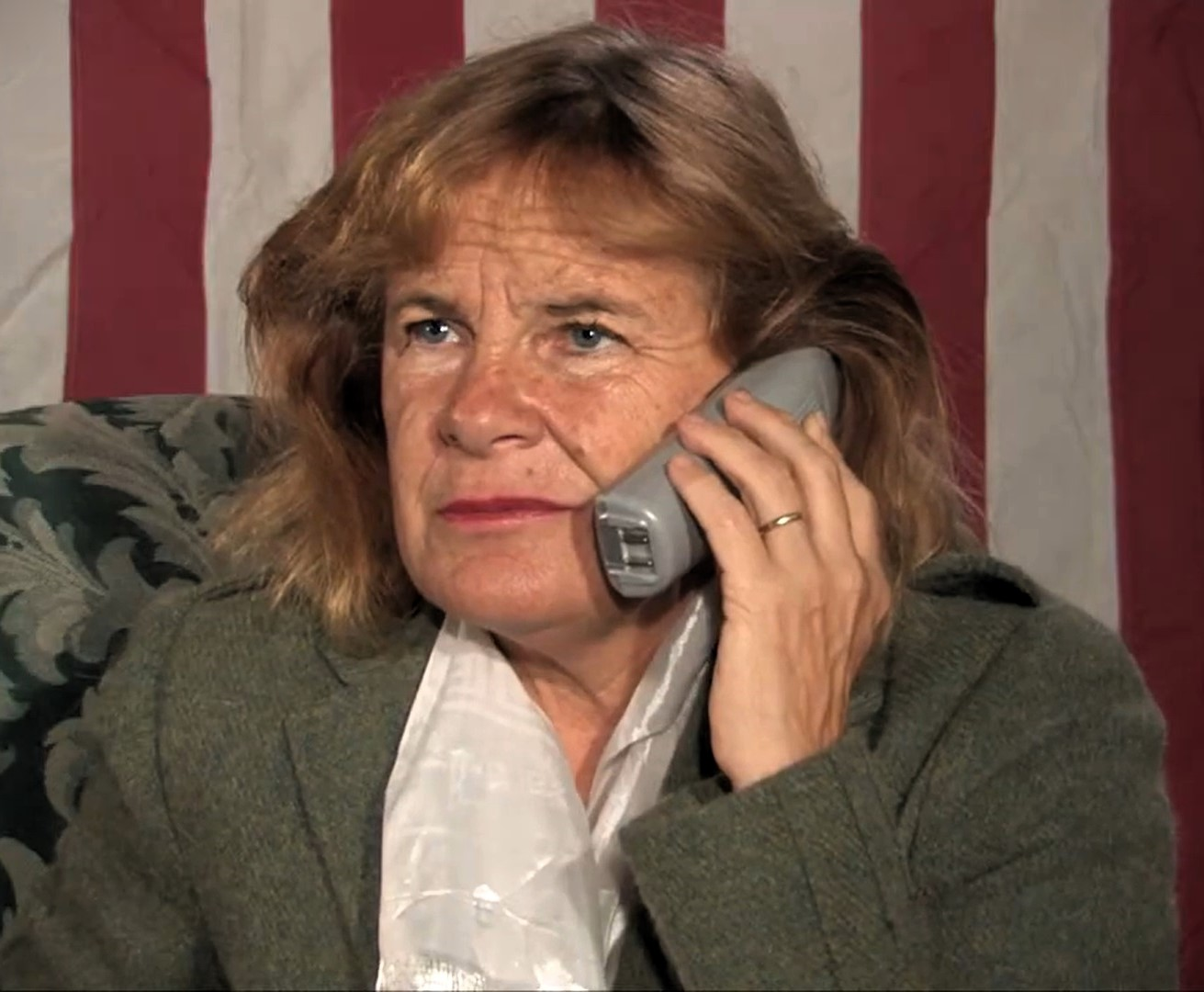
Faith Catlin in Dead Drop, 2013 short film

John Griesemer (born December 5, 1947, in Elizabeth, New Jersey) is an American author, journalist, and actor. He lives with his wife Faith Catlin (who acted in Ryan's Hope in the 1970s) and two children in New Hampshire. He is best known for his novel Signal and Noise.

== Life ==
John Griesemer is an American actor, journalist, and novelist, known for his work in theater, film and literature.

John Griesemer graduated from the Pingry School in New Jersey and Dickinson College in Pennsylvania. He began his career as a journalist for local newspapers. While working for a newspaper in Lebanon, New Hampshire, he wrote an article about a local theatre company, whose director persuaded him to work for that local theatre company. This opportunity led him to a two-year engagement with the company, performing in diverse roles including Romeo in Romeo and Juliet and other children's theater production, this way he came to the theater and the movies.

In 1977, Griesemer moved to New York City to study acting under Robert Lewis. In 1980, he starred in the world premiere of Close Ties by Elizabeth Diggs at the Lexington Conservatory Theatre, sharing the stage with Margaret Barker and Sofia Landon Geier. "A remarkable production of a lovely and loving play," said critic Jeffery Borak, who also called Griesemer's performance "remarkable."

Griesemer has appeared in films such as Malcolm X, Days of Thunder and The Crucible, as well as the miniseries The Langoliers.

In addition to acting, Griesemer is a writer. His first novel, No One Thinks of Greenland (2000), was adapted into the 2005 film as Guy X. His subsequent novel, Signal & Noise, which deals with transatlantic telephone cables, became a bestseller. Griesemer has also published several short stories.

== Novels ==
- No One Thinks of Greenland (2001)
- Signal & Noise (2003)
