= The Pearl Comb =

2025 British short film

- Directed by: Ali Cook
- Written by: Ali Cook
- Produced by: Matthew James Wilkinson; Ross Williams
- Starring: Beatie Edney; Ali Cook; Clara Paget; Simon Armstrong
- Cinematography: Dave Miller
- Edited by: Sadaf Nazari
- Music by: Clark (musician)
- Production company: Stigma Films
- Release date: 6 March 2025
- Running time: 20 minutes
- Country: United Kingdom
- Language: English

The Pearl Comb is an English-language fantasy drama short film starring Beatie Edney, Clara Paget, and Simon Armstrong. The film was written and directed by Ali Cook and released in 2025. It was produced by Matthew James Wilkinson at Stigma Films and premiered at the Tampere Film Festival on 6 March 2025. It won the Méliès d'Argent for Best European Fantastic Short Film, and the jury award for Best 'After Dark' short at the Savannah Film Festival. The film was shortlisted for Best Live Action Short at the 98th Academy Awards. It was also longlisted for a BAFTA Award for Best Short Film at the 79th British Academy Film Awards.

== Synopsis ==
In 1893, a fisherman’s wife becomes the first person to cure someone of tuberculosis. A doctor, intent on proving a woman’s place is in the home and not practising medicine, investigates - only to discover the source of her unearthly power.

== Cast ==
- Beatie Edney as Betty Lutey
- Clara Paget as The Mermaid
- Ali Cook as Gregory Lutey
- Simon Armstrong as Lutey
- Thomas Stocker as Arthur
- Roxana Cook as Edith

== Production ==
The Pearl Comb is an English production produced by Matthew James Wilkinson at Stigma Films and Ross Williams. Associate producers were Patrick Tolan, R. Paul Wilson and Amy Lockley.

The film was shot on an ARRI Alexa LF. Principal photography took place between the 15th and 20th of November 2023 in Penzance, Cornwall, and at the West London Film Studios on 5 and 6 December 2023. In 2025, Miranda Richardson joined as executive producer.

David Lancaster, the Academy Award winning producer of Whiplash, came on board as an Executive Producer in 2026. He said, "Ali Cook has pulled off a fabulously freaky fable. It feels as if Robert Eggers were channelling Guillermo del Toro! This twisted period piece surprises at every turn, blending myth and mermaid, empathy and evil, and building to a crackling finish".

Two-time Academy Award winning visual effects supervisor Paul Franklin commented of the film, "One of the things I really loved about the film is that it tells a proper story in just twenty minutes. It feels like it could be expanded into a bigger film, and yet it remains beautifully complete in its short form".

== Release ==
The Pearl Comb premiered at Finland's Tampere Film Festival on 6 March 2025. followed by the FrightFest screening at Glasgow Film Festival on 8 March 2025.

It also screened at Fantasia International Film Festival, FilmQuest, HollyShorts Film Festival St. Louis International Film Festival, Nashville Film Festival, Cleveland International Film Festival Flickers Rhode Island International Film Festival, and Imagine Film Festival.

Since 1 January 2026, the film has been available for streaming on Disney+ in Europe.

== Reception ==
In 2025, Miranda Richardson joined as an executive producer and praised the performances, noting, "I think the real key to its success is the standout performances with a story about the resilience of women against the societal structures that attempt to suppress them".

Joanna Laurie, producer of One Life starring Sir Anthony Hopkins, described it as "ambitious, smart, scary, dramatic, funny and above all, expertly crafted".

=== Awards ===
- It won the Méliès d'Argent for the Best Fantastic European Short Film at the Méliès International Festivals Federation.
- Horror Audience Choice award at Indy Shorts International Film Festival.
- Best "After Hours" Short at Cleveland International Film Festival and the Vortex awards for Best Horror Short and Best Cinematography at Flickers Rhode Island International Film Festival.
