= James Biberi =

Albanian-American actor (born 1965)

- Born: July 28, 1965 (age 61); Gjakova, SR Serbia, Yugoslavia (now Kosovo)
- Occupation: Actor
- Years active: 1993–present
- Known for: Drive, The Brave One

James Biberi (born July 28, 1965) is an Albanian-American actor, best known for his roles as Chris "Cook" in Drive (2011) and Ilir in Dead Man Down (2013).

== Early life ==
Biberi was born on July 28, 1965 in Gjakova, Kosovo.

== Filmography ==
=== Film ===
Year	Film	Role	Notes
1993	Amongst Friends	Passenger Narc	
1995	Clouds of Magellan	Kyle	
1997	Made Men	Vinny Morganti	
1998	Buddy Faro	Detective Franks	TV movie
2000	Fast Food Fast Women	Trick	
2002	Recipe for Disaster	Rocco	TV movie
2002	Analyze That	FBI Agent Miller	
2004	National Treasure	Helicopter Pilot	Uncredited
2005	Diamonds, Bullets & Fate	Besnik	Short film
2005	The Producers	Sing Sing Prison Guard	
2006	Find Me Guilty	Frank Brentano	
2006	Distraction	Sal	Short film
2006	The Hoax	McGraw-Hill Security Guard	
2007	Purple Violets	Elevator Operator	
2007	Gracie	Sal Brown	
2007	The Brave One	Detective Pitney	
2010	Coach	Raf (final match referee)	
2011	Drive	Cook	
2013	Dead Man Down	Ilir Brozi	
2013	The Girl on the Train	Cabbie	
2014	Amsterdam Express	Van Doom	
2018	Ocean's 8	Yuri	
2021	Locked In	Freddy	

=== Television ===
Year	Film	Role	Notes
1997	Silk Stalkings	Officer Mangionese	
1997	Law & Order	Reynolds	
1998	Melrose Place	Detective Hillman	
1999	As the World Turns	Drunk at Oasis	
2000	Third Watch	Carl	
2000	The Sopranos	Maitre'D	
2001	100 Centre Street	Joy Glass	3 episodes
2001	Law & Order	Detective #2	
2002	Law & Order: Special Victims Unit	Vice Sergeant Edward Derrico	
2002	Law & Order: Special Victims Unit	Narcotics Lieutenant	
2003	Law & Order: Special Victims Unit	Narcotics Agent #1	
2003	Sex and the City	FBI Agent	
2004	Law & Order	Stewart	
2005	Rescue Me	Vinny	3 episodes
2005	Law & Order: Special Victims Unit	ESU Captain Bauer	
2006	Law & Order: Criminal Intent	Captain Al Petrosino	Episode: "Contract"
2008–2010	Law & Order	Chief of Detectives Laird	3 episodes
2010	Law & Order: Criminal Intent	Detective Ryan Fields	Episode: "Broad Channel"
2013	Golden Boy	Robert Kilgore	
2014	The Blacklist	Pavlovich Brother #3	Episode: "The Pavlovich Brothers"
2018	Daredevil	Vic Jusufi	Episode: "Blindsided"
2021–2024	Hightown	Lt. Smith	9 episodes

=== Videogames ===
Year	Film	Role
2005	The Warriors	Police
2007	Manhunt 2	The Red Kings member
