= Amsterdam Express =

2014 film by Fatmir Koçi

- Directed by: Fatmir Koçi
- Written by: Fatmir Koçi; Jonathan Preece
- Produced by: Blerim Destani; Mike Downey; Rozeta Feri; Dritan Huqi; Edgar Kapp; Tanja Lunardelli; Kuba Szutkowski; Sam Taylor
- Starring: Blerim Destani; James Biberi; Natasha Goulden
- Cinematography: Enzo Brandner
- Edited by: Max Vonk
- Music by: Art Denison
- Production companies: Film and Music Entertainment; Act Triangle Production; Popov Film; Lara Film; Albanian Film Centre (support)
- Release date: 27 March 2014 (Albania)
- Running time: 107 minutes
- Countries: Albania; United Kingdom; Netherlands; Germany
- Languages: English; Albanian

Amsterdam Express is a 2014 Albanian drama film directed by Fatmir Koçi and co-written by Koci and Jonathan Preece. The film was an international co-production between studios based in Albania, Germany, the Netherlands, and the United Kingdom.

== Plot ==
Bekim, a young Albanian immigrant in Amsterdam, is precariously caught between the promise and allure of the rich city, the threats of ruthless Albanian drug dealers & sex traffickers, and his white marriage to a Dutch girl. At the heart of it all is a true love in his poor and backward country. Bekim, will do anything to make a quick buck. Instead, he returns to his country empty-handed after spending his last Euros to save a young girl at the windows of the red light district.

== Cast ==
- Blerim Destani as Bekim
- James Biberi as Van Doom
- Flonja Kodheli as Marta
- Bujar Lako as Selim
- Rajmonda Bulku as Vjollca
- Carolien Spoor as Suzanna
- Natasha Goulden as Anna
- Renne Gjoni as Grijs
- Victoria Mirovaya as Junkie Girl
- Gert Ferra as Roni
- Dritan Kastrati as Deki
- Olta Gixhari as Dora
- Irena Mecaj as Albana
- Laert Pasko as Tuki
- Lykele Muus as Johan
- Gjenovefa Redhi as Shqipe
- Vasian Lami as Elezi

== Production ==
Amsterdam Express was directed by Fatmir Koci and co-written by Koci and Jonathan Preece. Albania's Act Triangle Production, United Kingdom's Film and Music Entertainment, Netherlands' Popov Film, and Germany's Lara Film were involved in the production. This was the first time that a company from the United Kingdom was involved in an Albanian film production. Funding for the film was obtained from the international partners and the Albanian Film Centre. Mike Downey, the head of Film and Music Entertainment, first met Koci in France in 1995, and made documentaries together at the Imaginary Academy in Grožnjan in 1999.

Six weeks of filming was done in Amsterdam and additional filming was conducted in Tirana. Filming ended on 23 August 2013, and post-production was done in Amsterdam. Max Vonk edited the film.

== Release ==
Amsterdam Express was released in Albania on 27 March 2014.

== Works cited ==
- "Amsterdam Express". British Council.
- Mitchell, Wendy (13 August 2013). "First UK-Albania co-production now shooting". Screen Daily. Archived from the original on 5 April 2025.
- Ramachandran, Naman (20 August 2013). "Fatmir Koci boards Amsterdam Express". Cineuropa. Archived from the original on 5 April 2025.
