= Der Spalt =

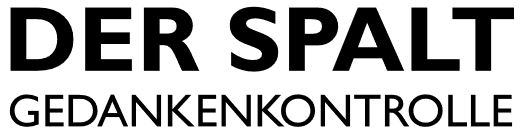
- Film poster
- Directed by: Kim Schicklang
- Written by: Kim Schicklang
- Story by: Kim Schicklang
- Produced by: Christian Schieferdecker; Adrian Copitzky
- Starring: Marie Fischer; Folker Dücker; Dorothea Baltzer
- Cinematography: Christian Butz
- Edited by: Kim Schicklang
- Music by: Jens Hürkamp; Fabian Schaller; Kim Schicklang
- Distributed by: Schöne Neue Medien
- Release date: June 7, 2014 (Germany)
- Running time: 101 minutes
- Country: Germany
- Language: German

Der Spalt (The Gap - Mindcontrol) is a 2014 German feature film. The film was written and directed by Kim Schicklang. It was released on June 7, 2014. In 2015 the film won an international film prize in Jakarta.

== Plot ==
The film is a drama which revolves around the isolation of a young transsexual called Alex. She is living together with her jobless mother in a dystopia. There is no hope for her. But Alex is getting in touch with Christian, a photo reporter. He is the first who recognized Alex as a woman. Together they try a revolution against sex and gender norming.

== Cast ==
- Marie Fischer - Alex
- Folker Dücker - Christian
- Dorothea Baltzer - Mother
- Werner Braunschädel - Professor Bernhard
- Bernd Michael Straub - Frau Müller
- Trischa Dorner - The Face
- Yana Robin LaBaume - Lesbian

== See also ==
- List of lesbian, gay, bisexual or transgender-related films
- Transgender in film and television
