= Guy X =

- UK DVD Cover Art
- Directed by: Saul Metzstein
- Written by: Steve Attridge; John Paul Chapple; John Griesemer
- Produced by: Mike Downey
- Starring: Jason Biggs; Natascha McElhone; Jeremy Northam; Michael Ironside
- Music by: Hilmar Örn Hilmarsson; Charlie Mole
- Production companies: Movision; The Film Consortium; Spice Factory; Film and Music Entertainment; Syon Media
- Distributed by: Metro Tartan Distribution
- Release date: 14 October 2005 (UK)
- Running time: 101 minutes
- Countries: United Kingdom; Iceland; Canada
- Language: English
- Box office: $42,022

Guy X is a 2005 black comedy war film directed by Saul Metzstein, based on the novel No One Thinks of Greenland by John Griesemer. The film stars Jason Biggs, Natascha McElhone, Jeremy Northam, and Michael Ironside, and follows US Army Corporal Rudy Spruance (Biggs), who is mistakenly posted to a military base in Greenland.

== Plot ==
It is 1979, four years after the end of US involvement in the Vietnam War. US Army Corporal Rudy Spruance is mistakenly sent to Qangattarsa, a remote base in Greenland still attributed to the United States Army Air Forces (despite that service being converted to the United States Air Force in 1947), instead of his official posting in Hawaii. He soon finds out that his records have accidentally been switched with the records of a Corporal Martin Pederson, who has been sent to Hawaii.

The base is occupied by a co-ed battalion of US Army misfits, many of whom have been stationed there for over five years, doing little more than drink and sex their way through the overwhelming boredom. The only apparent military duty is to unload and reload a supply plane every couple of months. The base has been commanded for many years by the near-insane Lt. Col. L. G. Woolwrap, supported by his Aide of three years, SFC Irene Teal, his erstwhile girlfriend. Teal points out that it does not make much difference who Spruance really is, nor where he is based, as it all just functions as service time.

Working under the name Pederson, as the base's new Public Information Officer, Spruance starts an intimate and personal relationship with Teal. While exploring he finds out that underneath the base is a secret and highly classified hospital ward. The ward houses the last six surviving, unnamed (other than letters, including W, X, Y, Z), brain dead and very physically damaged soldiers from a secret Vietnam War mission in October 1973. When Spruance/Pederson stumbles upon the ward, he develops a rapport with "Guy X", who has lucid moments that no one else knows about. Spruance sleuths out that then-Col. Woolwrap had been the leader of the mission, and has been in command of the palliative care base ever since – having signed the letters to the families of the ward patients stating that they had died in combat and that their bodies were irretrievable. On one of his clandestine visits to the ward, Spruance meets an unnamed plainclothes operative from the Department of the Army, who confirms that the soldiers are "classified loose ends, an exercise in patience", as they wait for them to die.

Guy X dictates a letter to Spruance, for the wife of one of his men. Spruance sneaks the letter out on the next supply plane. The letter has an impact as some weeks later, at the height of the 24 hour darkness of the winter solstice, the Army orders a sudden and rapid shutdown of the base due to "compromised security". The same mysterious operative appears, telling Spruance by name (as they have clarified his identity) that the remaining "Guys" will be disposed of (in an undescribed way). Spruance and Teal find Guy X under his bed in the otherwise abandoned ward, and answer his request to see the outside world before he dies. Just as Guy X dies in the snow, Woolwrap finds them and tells Spruance and Teal that he will not abandon his men, killing himself with his sidearm. The two just make it to the last evacuation plane, where his friend Cpl Lavone informs them that he has created official paperwork giving them new names and ranks (similar to the original Spruance/Pederson mixup). As the plane flies away from Greenland, "General" Lavone asks the small group which base, in which (warm) country, they wish to have designated in their "new" orders.

== Cast ==
- Jason Biggs as Corporal Rudy Spruance / Corporal Martin Pederson
- Natascha McElhone as SFC Irene Teal, Woolwrap's aide
- Jeremy Northam as Lieutenant Colonel L.G. Woolwrap, base Commanding Officer
- Sean Tucker as Corporal Lavone, Rudy's friend and base Entertainment Officer
- Michael Ironside as Guy X, a wounded Vietnam veteran
- Hilmir Snær Guðnason as Petri
- Harry Standjofski as Chaplain Brank
- Rob deLeeuw as Slim
- Donny Falsetti as Sgt. Genteen
- Jonathan Higgins as Vord
- Benz Antoine as Philly
- Mariah Inger as May
- Dino Tosques as Chef

== Reception ==
=== Box office ===
Guy X had a limited release in the United Kingdom. The film was in theaters for one weekend and grossed $40,032, ranking 20th in the box office.

=== Critical response ===
The film has received a rating of 42% on review aggregate website Rotten Tomatoes based on 12 reviews, with an average rating of 5.1/10.

=== Accolades ===
Year	Award	Category	Result
2005	British Independent Film Award	Best Achievement in Production	Nominated
2005	Taormina Film Fest Award	Best Actor (Jason Biggs)	Won
2005	Taormina Film Fest Award	Best Director	Won
