= Wasted Youth (film) =

- Directed by: Argyris Papadimitropoulos; Jan Vogel
- Release date: March 17, 2011
- Running time: 122 minutes
- Country: Greece
- Language: Greek

Wasted Youth is a Greek drama film from 2011, directed by Argyris Papadimitropoulos and Jan Vogel. It served as the opening film of the 2011 International Film Festival Rotterdam.

The film was inspired by the shooting of Alexandros Grigoropoulos, one of the events that led to the 2008 Greek riots.

== Plot ==
Harris, a teenage skater, hangs out with his friends experiencing Athens and girls. A middle aged cop, Vassilis, seems unhappy with his life. One night the two cross paths.

== Production ==
The film was made without the use of a script, and rather was composed of improvised lines by actors following a loose outline.
