= Proyecto Dos =

- Proyecto Dos theatrical poster
- Directed by: Guillermo Fernández Groizard
- Written by: Nacho Cabana; Guillermo Fernández Groizard; Manuel Valdivia; Chus Vallejo; Margarita Varea
- Produced by: Mike Downey; Zorana Piggott; José Antonio Romero; Sam Taylor
- Starring: Helena Carrión; Óscar Casas; Adrià Collado; Josep Maria Pou; Lucía Jiménez
- Edited by: José Ramón Lorenzo Picado
- Music by: Daniel Sánchez de la Hera; Christopher Slaski; Crispin Taylor
- Production companies: Film and Music Entertainment; DeA Planeta Home Entertainment; Ensueño Films; Rioja Films Producciones Cinematográficas S.L.
- Distributed by: DeA Planeta Home Entertainment Spain; Sunfilm Entertainment Germany DVD
- Release date: April 25, 2008
- Running time: 141 minutes
- Country: Spain
- Language: Spanish

Proyecto Dos (Eng: Project Two) is a 2008 Spanish action/thriller film and the feature debut of television director Guillermo Fernández Groizard. The film had its festival premiere on April 8, 2008 at the Malaga Spanish Film Festival, and its theatrical debut on April 25, 2008.

== Production ==
The film's working title was Laberinto de espejos. The director stated that the casting process was tedious, but that they had the freedom to rewrite portions of the film as suitable actors were found, to better match character to actors. The production was shot on locations in Argentina, London, and Madrid. The film went to festivals in Europe under the English language title of Project Two, and was released on DVD in 2009 under the German title Projekt 2. It is screening in 2010 under the shorter title Dos.

== Synopsis ==
Diego leads a pleasant and ordinary life. One night on TV, he sees a man identical to himself get killed in a road accident in Argentina. From then on he begins to realise that nothing is what he thought: not his parents, not his wife... not even himself.

== Cast ==
- Helena Carrión as Gema
- Óscar Casas as Mateo
- Adrià Collado as Diego Durand
- Josep Maria Pou as Malcolm
- Lucía Jiménez as Susan Durand
- Manuel Zarzo
- Tomás del Estal
- Yaiza Esteve as Olga
- Núria Gago as Emilia
- Jesús Granda
- Alfonso Lara as Martin
- María Luisa Merlo
- Carlos Olalla as Eldrich
- Bruno Squarcia as Dajanov
- Arturo Briones as Agente británico
- Cynthia Bachilieri as Sara
- Andrew Bicknell as John

== Reception ==
Público found the visual style and pace of the film pleasing, while Soitu found it a rare example of an action and special effects drama from Spanish cinema, usually only seen in Hollywood productions. Marcus Littwin of Die-besten-Horrorfilme praised the film and its director, noting that the story quickly draws in the audience, and was impressed with the stunning images and exciting action and twists.

Conversely, Carmen Porschen of Movie Maze found the film started well, but had major flaws, finding that the strong opening soon dilutes into an unoriginal story consistent with an average television movie.

== Recognition ==
=== Awards and nominations ===
- 2008, nominated for Golden Biznaga at The Malaga Spanish Film Festival

== See also ==
- List of Spanish films of 2008
