= Film and Music Entertainment =

British film production company

- Company type: Private
- Industry: Film production
- Founded: London, UK, 2000
- Founder: Mike Downey; Sam Taylor
- Headquarters: Dublin, Ireland
- Website: fame.uk.com

Film and Music Entertainment (F&ME, FAME) is a British film production company based in Dublin, Ireland. The company was founded by Mike Downey and Sam Taylor in 2000, then headquartered in London, and has since produced many films, including Guy X and Deathwatch.

== History ==
Launched in 2000 as part of a public offering on the Frankfurt Neuer Markt, Film and Music Entertainment was the subject of a management buy-out by its principals Sam Taylor and Mike Downey in 2003, and as an independent entity has kept to its annual production targets of producing 2 inhouse films and between 4 and 6 co-productions a year in the £1.5 - £5 million budget range.

The first decade of F&ME’s existence saw it entering into production on circa 50 international co-productions with a total budget of EUR 120 million involving 102 production companies from all over Europe. It now has a catalogue of rights in over 50 features including Academy Award Nominee and Venice Golden Lion winner Before the Rain, box office horror hit Deathwatch; Cannes Directors’ Fortnight opener Princess; Sundance South African hit Son of Man; Jason Biggs starrer GUY X and Dinard winner White Lightnin as well as 2012 Berlinale Audience Award Winner Parada by Srdjan Dragojevic.

The company remains fully owned and managed by producers Mike Downey (European Film Academy Board Member, BAFTA Council member and member of the BAFTA Film Committee) and Sam Taylor ( Board of PACT) backed by its advisory board film director Stephen Daldry (Chairman), ex-Creative Artists Agency agent Johanna Baldwin, former Chief Executive of the Guardian Group, James Markwick, merchant banker and internet investor Matthew Wilson.

== Filmography ==
- Under the Stars (2001)
- Falcons (2002)
- Deathwatch (2002)
- Loving Glances (2003)
- Cold Light (2004)
- Niceland (2004)
- My Brother Is a Dog (2004)
- Strings (2004)
- Murk (2005)
- Eleven Men Out (2005)
- The Call of the Toad (2005)
- The Headsman (2005)
- Guy X (2005)
- Mystery of the Wolf (2006)
- Karaula (2006)
- Anastezsi (2007)
- Quest for a Heart (2007)
- Proyecto Dos (2008)
- White Lightnin' (2009)
- Buick Riviera (2009)
- Donkey (2009)
- Reykjavik Whale Watching Massacre (2009)
- Turtle:The Incredible Journey (2009)
- StreetKids United (2011)
- The Mortician (2011)
- The Parade (2011)
- Zagreb Stories vol. 2 (2012)
- Lilet Never Happened (2012)
- Imagine (2012)
- Goltzius and the Pelican Company (2012)
- Rölli ja kultainen avain (2013)
- The Arbiter (2013)
- Noye's Fludde – Unogumbe (2013)
- Rio 50 Degrees (2014)
- Amsterdam Express (2014)
- Atomski zdesna (2014)
- President Nixon's Present (2014)
- Lost in Karastan (2014)
- Breathe Umphefumlo (2015)
- Zivot je truba (2015)
- Streetkids United II – The Girls from Rio (2015)
- In Search of a Miracle
- Cassy and Jude
- I Want to Be Like You (2016)
