= Imagine (2012 film) =

2012 film

- Film poster
- Directed by: Andrzej Jakimowski
- Written by: Andrzej Jakimowski
- Produced by: François d'Artemare; Andrzej Jakimowski; Vladimir Kokh
- Starring: Edward Hogg, Alexandra Maria Lara, David Atrakchi, Teresa Madruga, Luís Lucas
- Cinematography: Adam Bajerski
- Distributed by: Zjednoczenie Artystów i Rzemieslników, KMBO, Film and Music Entertainment, Polish Film Institute, Centre National de la Cinématographie (CNC), Instituto do Cinema e do Audiovisual (ICA), Canal+ Polska, CanDo Films, Filmes do Tejo (II)
- Release dates: 10 September 2012 (TIFF); 12 April 2013 (Poland)
- Running time: 105 minutes
- Country: Poland
- Language: English

Imagine is a 2012 Polish drama film directed by Andrzej Jakimowski.

== Plot ==
A blind teacher breaks the rules to help a female student rediscover the pleasures of life.

== Cast ==
- Edward Hogg as Ian
- Alexandra Maria Lara as Eva
- João Vaz as José
- Melchior Derouet as Serrano
- Francis Frappat as Doctor
- João Lagarto as Brother Humberto

== Release ==
Imagine was released in:

- Poland on 13 October 2012 at the Warsaw Film Festival.

== Awards ==
Polish Film Awards (2014)

- Guillaume LeBras and Jacek Hamela were nominated and won the Eagle award for the Best Sound.

Seattle International Film Festival (2013)

- Edward Hogg was nominated for a Golden Space Needle Award for Best Actor at the Seattle International Film Festival in 2013.

Warsaw International Film Festival (2012)

- Andrzej Jakimowski was nominated and won the Audience Award for Feature Film.
- Andrzej Jakimowski was nominated and won the Best Director award.
- Andrzej Jakimowski was nominated for the Grand Prix award.
