= Goltzius and the Pelican Company =

2012 film

- Theatrical poster
- Directed by: Peter Greenaway
- Written by: Peter Greenaway
- Produced by: Kees Kasander
- Starring: Ramsey Nasr; F. Murray Abraham; Giulio Berruti
- Cinematography: Reinier van Brummelen
- Edited by: Elmer Leupen
- Music by: Marco Robino
- Production companies: Kasander Film Company; Catherine Dussart Productions; Film and Music Entertainment; Mainframe Film Production
- Distributed by: A-Film Benelux (Netherlands); Axiom Films (United Kingdom); Epicentre Films (France); Maremosso (Italy)
- Release dates: 30 September 2012 (NFF); 18 September 2014 (Netherlands)
- Running time: 128 minutes
- Countries: Netherlands; France; United Kingdom; Croatia
- Languages: English; Dutch; French
- Budget: €2,05 million
- Box office: $73,393

Goltzius and the Pelican Company is a 2012 historical drama film written and directed by Peter Greenaway and starring Ramsey Nasr, F. Murray Abraham and Giulio Berruti.

The film is the second feature in Greenaway's film series "Dutch Masters", which includes the previous film Nightwatching. The third entry in the series was to focus on Hieronymus Bosch and its release was planned to coincide with the 500th anniversary of Bosch's death in 2016.

== Plot ==
The film is a creative interpretation of the life of Hendrik Goltzius, a late 16th-century Dutch artist. In the film, Goltzius is portrayed as seducing the Margrave of Alsace to obtain funding for a printing press and to publish illustrated books. Goltzius promises him an extraordinary book of pictures of the Old Testament stories, including tales of the temptation of Adam and Eve, Lot and his daughters, David and Bathsheba, Joseph and Potiphar's wife, Samson and Delilah, and John the Baptist and Salome. To tempt the Margrave further, Goltzius and his printing company offer to perform dramatizations of these erotic stories for his court.

== Cast ==
- Ramsey Nasr as Hendrick Goltzius
- F. Murray Abraham as The Margrave of Alsace
- Goran Bogdan as Gottlieb
- Truus de Boer as Sophie
- Nada Abrus as Marie
- Duško Valentić as Priest
- Milan Pleština as Priest 3
- Enes Vejzović as Churchman 1
- Vedran Živolić as Joachim
- Katija Zubčić as Beatrice Fereres
- Boris Bakal as Messenger
- Vedran Komerički as Churchman
- Samir Vujčić as Priest 2
- Tvrtko Jurić as Priest 4

The Pelican Company

- Giulio Berruti as Thomas Boethius
- Kate Moran as Adaela
- Flavio Parenti as Eduard Hansa
- Anne Louise Hassing as Susannah
- Hendrik Aerts as Strachey
- Halina Reijn as Portia
- Lars Eidinger as Quadfrey
- Pippo Delbono as Samuel van Gouda

The Margrave's family and court

- Maaike Neuville as Isadora
- Lisette Malidor as Ebola Goyal
- Vincent Riotta as Ricardo del Monte
- Francesco De Vito as Rabbi Moab
- Stefano Scherini as Johannes Cleaver

== Release and reception ==
Goltzius and the Pelican Company made its debut at the 2012 Netherlands Film Festival.

The film was released in cinemas two years after its debut in 2012. It was released in the Netherlands on September 18, 2014, and it became the least visited Dutch co-production of that year with only 110 tickets sold.

January 8, 2015, the film had its Philadelphia premiere at Andrew's Video Vault at The Rotundra (4014 Walnut Street) on a double feature with Derek Jarman's Blue (1993).

November 14, 2017, Woodmere Art Museum (Philadelphia) presented the movie, introduced by art historian Nicole Elizabeth Cook.

== Awards ==
Greenaway won the FICE Award for Best European Director at the FICE- Federazione Italiana Cinema d’Essai in 2014. He was also nominated for the New Visions Award for Best Motion Picture at the Sitges - Catalan International Film Festival in 2013.
