= The Headsman =

- A poster bearing one of the film's alternative titles: Shadow of the Sword
- Directed by: Simon Aeby
- Written by: Susanne Freund; Steve Attridge
- Produced by: Mike Downey; Sam Taylor; Helmut Grasser; Marcel Hoehn; Sam Lavender; Péter Miskolczi; Zorana Piggott; Peter Rommel; Claude Waringo
- Starring: Nikolaj Coster-Waldau; Peter McDonald; Anastasia Griffith
- Cinematography: Vladimír Smutný
- Distributed by: Allegro Film; Eurofilm Stúdió; Film and Music Entertainment; Samsa Film; T&C Film AG
- Release date: 2005
- Running time: 115 minutes
- Countries: United Kingdom; Austria; Switzerland; Luxembourg; Hungary; Germany
- Language: English

The Headsman (aka Shadow of the Sword, Au. Henker) is a 2005 film directed by Simon Aeby. Set in early 16th century Tyrol, it is set before the background of the turmoils of the Lutheran Reformation. It was filmed in Austria and Hungary.

== Plot ==
The Headsman tells a story of loyalty tested by two friends during Europe's 16th-century Inquisition. Orphans Martin (Nikolaj Coster-Waldau) and Georg (Peter McDonald) bond as children, but walk very different paths as adults. Georg follows his calling to join the church, while Martin becomes an army captain. When fate places Martin in the role of executioner, he must choose between friendship and fundamentalist doctrine.

== Cast ==
- Nikolaj Coster-Waldau as Martin
- Peter McDonald as Georg
- Anastasia Griffith as Anna
- Steven Berkoff as Inquisitor
- Eddie Marsan as Fabio
- Julie Cox as Margaretha
- John Shrapnel as Archbishop
- Lee Ingleby as Bernhard
- Patrick Godfrey as Bertram
- Joe Mason as Jakob

== Awards ==
Montréal World Film Festival – 2005

- Nominated for the Grand Prix des Amériques award.
