= A House in Jerusalem =

- Theatrical release poster
- Directed by: Muayad Alayan
- Written by: Muayad Alayan; Rami Musa Alayan
- Starring: Johnny Harris; Miley Locke; Sheherazade Farrell
- Distributed by: Peccadillo Pictures (United Kingdom)
- Release date: 1 February 2023 (Toronto International Film Festival)
- Running time: 104 minutes
- Countries: Palestine; United Kingdom; Germany; Netherlands; Qatar
- Language: English
- Box office: $14,861 (international)

A House in Jerusalem is a 2023 fantasy drama film directed by Muayad Alayan. It premiered in February 2023 at the Rotterdam International Film Festival. The film tells the story of a Jewish-British girl Rebecca and her father who move to Israel into a West Jerusalem home, where she encounters the ghost of a Palestinian girl named Rasha whom only she can see. Rasha's family was expelled from that home during the 1948 Palestine war known as the Nakba. Eventually, Rebecca makes a visit to Bethlehem's Aida Camp in the Israeli-occupied West Bank to repay a past debt after her father had thrown out Rasha's doll, and in search of the house's historical owners. The film's screenplay was written by Muayad and Rami Musa Alayan, two Palestinian brothers. It was released by Netflix in early 2024.

== Background ==
A House in Jerusalem is written and directed by Muayad Alayan, a Palestinian whose family was among the roughly 750,000 Palestinian Arabs who fled or were expelled from what had become Israel during the 1948 Palestine war, also known as the Nakba, and not allowed to return. Alayan's family history inspired the film. He came up with the idea for the film in 2009 while passing through his family's former neighborhood in West Jerusalem, Israel, where he saw what looked like a newly immigrant Jewish family moving into one of the city's old houses.

== Plot ==
The film tells the story of a Jewish-British girl named Rebecca that moved with her father Michael to Israel into a West Jerusalem villa that was inherited by her grandfather who had bought it from the Israeli state in the 1960s. Rebecca finds an old doll in a well within the villa's garden which she rescues but eventually thrown away by her father. She later finds out that the doll belongs to Rasha, a Palestinian girl who she encounters as a ghost who only she can see. Apologizing to Rasha for the loss of her doll, she feels a sense of debt to the past that she should repay.

Israeli police pay a visit to the British family after Rebecca posted a picture online of the house, inquiring about its historical owners. She eventually makes a visit to nearby Bethlehem's Aida Camp in the Israeli-occupied West Bank, where Rasha's parents were reported to have fled to during the 1948 Palestine war. There, Rebecca meets old Rasha, who is eventually taken by Rebecca's father to visit her old house.

== Cast ==
- Johnny Harris as Michael
- Miley Locke as Rebecca
- Sheherazade Farrell as Rasha

== Production ==
The Jerusalem house was filmed in East Jerusalem rather than the western part as it would have been difficult to convince the tenants there of shooting a film narrating the Palestinian history of it according to the director. The director also stated that the film had to be shot incognito and claim that it was for documentary purposes as doing otherwise would have complicated the licensing process from Israeli authorities. The film is the first ever UK/Palestine joint production.

== Critical reception ==
A House in Jerusalem received generally positive reviews, with 75% of eight reviews on review aggregator Rotten Tomatoes being positive. A review in the Financial Times described it as being accessible for young viewers and that it wraps up "with a degree of contrivance and sentiment, but conveys its historical lesson economically." Steve Rose, writing for The Guardian, commented that "the deeper roots of the story give it extra resonance and relevance, while the broader regional landscape of dispossession and inter-generational trauma are encapsulated with some subtlety and sensitivity." A review in The Jewish Chronicle gave the film two out of five stars and called the film "awfully presumptuous", chiefly objecting to the premise that a 10-year-old British Jewish girl may not have been told by her family about the "context in which Israel was established and exists".
