= Lost in Karastan =

- British poster
- Directed by: Ben Hopkins
- Written by: Ben Hopkins; Paweł Pawlikowski
- Produced by: Daniel Zuta; Mike Downey; Sam Taylor; Vladimir Katcharava; Artem Vassiliev
- Starring: Matthew Macfadyen; MyAnna Buring; Noah Taylor; Ali Cook
- Distributed by: Brandstorm Entertainment AG; Film and Music Entertainment; 20 Steps Production; Metrafilms
- Release date: 23 August 2014 (WFF)
- Running time: 96 minutes
- Countries: Germany; United Kingdom; Georgia; France
- Languages: English; Russian; Turkish
- Box office: $ 1 641

Lost in Karastan is a 2014 black comedy film directed by Ben Hopkins.

== Plot ==
Lost in Karastan is a gentle black comedy about a confused English director, Emil, who is hired to direct a production in the Caucasus region. The country, Autonomous Republic of Karastan, is led by an eccentric corrupt but benign dictator. There Emil embarks on one of the wildest journeys of his already diverse career.

== Cast ==
- Matthew Macfadyen as Emil Forester
- MyAnna Buring as Chulpan
- Noah Taylor as Xan Butler
- Ali Cook as Daniel
- Ümit Ünal as Saro
- Richard Van Weyden as President Abashiliev
- Vedat Erincin as Mountain Man
- María Fernández Ache as Marian
- Amiran Katchibaia as Agdur
- Leo Antadze as Igor
- Lasha Ramishvili as Ruslan
- Dato Velijanashvili as Shadow

== Release ==
Lost in Karastan premiered in the UK as the opening film of the London Comedy Film Festival (LOCO) on 22 January 2015.

== Awards ==
At Filmfest Hamburg, the film won the 'Hamburg Producers Awards' for the best 'European Cinema Co-production' and 'German-European Cinematic Production', presented to Daniel Zuta and Vladimer Katcharava.

Ben Hopkins was nominated for the 'Grand Prix des Amériques' award at the Montréal World Film Festival in 2014.
