= Mystery of the Wolf =

- Original Finnish film poster
- Directed by: Raimo O Niemi
- Written by: Heikki Vuento
- Produced by: Leila Lyytikäinen, Risto Salomaa, Claes Olsson, Mike Downey, Sam Taylor, Börje Hansson
- Release date: 2006
- Running time: 90 minutes
- Countries: Finland; Sweden; UK
- Language: Finnish
- Budget: €1.9 million
- Box office: €712,921

Mystery of the Wolf (Finnish: Suden arvoitus) is a 2006 Finnish drama directed by Raimo O Niemi.

== Synopsis ==
Mystery of the Wolf tells the story of Salla, a girl who has been abandoned by her mother and falls under the protection of a pack of wolves. After being found and returned to society, Salla still feels a strong connection to wild animals, and as she grows has to decide between her loyalties to her family and to the animals that once protected her.

== Awards ==
- First Light Young Jurors Award, London Children's Film Festival.
- Golden Cairo for Best Film, Cairo International Film Festival.
- 49. Nordische Filmtage Lübeck, Germany Prize of the Children's Jury
- Moscow Film Festival for Children and Young People, Russia Moscow Teddy Bear.
- 7th Riga International Children's Film Festival “Berimor's Cinema”, Latvia, Audience Award.

== See also ==
- Tommy and the Wildcat
