= Ben Hopkins =

British film director

- Born: 1969 (age 56–57); Hong Kong
- Occupations: Film director, screenwriter, novelist
- Years active: 1996–present

Ben Hopkins (born 1969) is a British film director, screenwriter and novelist.

His film Simon Magus entered the 49th Berlin International Film Festival competition in 1999. His 2008 film, The Market: A Tale of Trade (Turkish: Pazar: Bir Ticaret Masalı) won awards at film festivals in Locarno, Ghent and Antalya, where it was the first film directed by a foreigner to win an award in the national competition.

In 2021, Ben Hopkins wrote a novel called Cathedral. David Wiley in a review on the Rain Taxi, writes that Hopkins as a screenwriter and filmmaker, Hopkins also employs far more filmic allusions than literary ones, such as stone facedly referencing Monty Python at two very unfunny moments and making a few glancing nods toward The Princess Bride, another work of a great screenwriter/novelist. Nicknaming his jejune stonecutter “Rettich” and placing great stress on the association with the word radish, Hopkins almost certainly invokes the celebrated Chartres scene in F for Fake, during which Welles mistily refers to the contemporary human as a “poor forked radish,” an allusion to Thomas Carlyle's riff on Falstaff's description of Robert Shallow in Henry IV, Part 2. That's quite a thread of association from film to architecture to literature, and Hopkins dispenses with that thread on the novel's first page. Otherwise largely literature free in its associative language and aesthetic order, this brilliantly imagined, gorgeously designed, and deeply profound novel is nonetheless a magnificent work of literature itself.

His other notable films include Lost in Karastan, written with Paweł Pawlikowski, and Inside, starring Willem Dafoe.

== Selected filmography ==
Year	Title	Director	Writer
1999	Simon Magus	Yes	Yes
2000	The Nine Lives of Tomas Katz	Yes	Yes
2008	The Market: A Tale of Trade	Yes	Yes
2014	Lost in Karastan	Yes	Yes
2023	Inside	No	Yes
2025	Fuze	No	Yes

== Bibliography (selection) ==
- Cathedral: a novel (2021)
