= Rudolph Herzog =

German film director, producer and writer

- Born: 1973 (age 52–53); Munich
- Citizenship: Germany
- Occupations: Film director, producer and writer

Rudolph Herzog (born 1973, Munich) is a German film director, producer and writer.

== Films ==
- 2022: Last Exit: Space, a documentary about colonizing space, director; Last Exit: Space at IMDb
- 2019: How to Fake a War, released at the Edinburgh International Film Festival, How to Fake a War at IMDb
- 2011: BBC/ARD documentary on humour in Nazi Germany based on the book Dead Funny
- 2014:The President, coproducer, a feature film about the last days of a dictator.
  - Best Film at the Chicago Film Festival, the Audience Award for Best Film from the Tokyo FILMeX and the Beirut International Film Festival and the Golden Hooker Award at the Galway Film Fleadh; The President at IMDb
- 2014: A Short History of Nuclear Folly; original German title: Die Atombombe im Vorgarten; A Short History of Nuclear Folly at IMDb
  - A documentary based on the book Der verstrahlte Westernheld translated as A Short History of Nuclear Folly
- 2010: Amundsen - Lost in the Arctic, a National Geographic documentary on polar explorer Roald Amundsen, writer, director
- 2008: Abora - Letzte Position Atlantik
- The Agent, about the Stasi double agent Werner Stiller
- 2006: Heil Hitler, das Schwein ist tot! - Humor unterm Hakenkreuz; Heil Hitler, das Schwein ist tot! at IMDb
  - TV film about Holocaust humor
  - English title: Ve Have Vays Of Making You Laugh. Jokes about Hitler could get you killed...)
  - 2007: UK release (BBC): Laughing with Hitler, narrator; Laughing with Hitler at IMDb
- 2004: The White Diamond, documentary, screenplay by Rudolph Herzog; directed by Werner Herzog; The White Diamond at IMDb
- 2004: The Heist, reality crime series, director

== Books ==
- 2017: Truggestalten
  - A collection of seven supernatural stories
  - 2019: Translation: Ghosts of Berlin ISBN 9781612197517
- 2012: Der verstrahlte Westernheld und anderer Irrsinn aus dem Atomzeitalter ("The irradiated western hero and other madness from the nuclear age")
  - 2014: Translation: A Short History of Nuclear Folly
- 2006: Heil Hitler, das Schwein ist tot! Lachen unter Hitler - Komik und Humor im Dritten Reich, ISBN 3821807733
  - 2011: Translation: Dead Funny. Telling Jokes in Hitler's Germany (based on Laughing with Hitler)
    - Named Book of the Year by The Atlantic
