= Vertigo Films =

British production company

- Type: Private
- Industry: Film, television
- Founded: July 2002; 24 years ago
- Headquarters: London, United Kingdom
- Key people: James Richardson (co founder); Allan Niblo (co founder); Jane Moore (CEO)
- Parent: Federation Studios
- Divisions: Protagonist Pictures (joint venture with Film4 Productions and Ingenious Media)
- Website: vertigofilms.com

Vertigo Films is a British television and film production company based in London, England. It now focuses solely on the production of television series, with subsidiary company Vertigo Releasing taking over film distribution.

== History ==
Vertigo Films was created in July 2002, by producers Allan Niblo (producer of Human Traffic and South West 9) and James Richardson (producer of Kiss Kiss (Bang Bang)).

Director Nick Love (screenwriter and, prior to company formation, director of Goodbye Charlie Bright and The Football Factory) and distributor Rupert Preston (distributor of Chopper, Chasing Amy and Bride of Chucky, among others) joined a year later, while entrepreneur Rob Morgan began investment in November 2004.

The company was formed for the express purpose of distributing and producing two films, The Football Factory and It's All Gone Pete Tong. Vertigo Films's film releases were distributed on home video by Entertainment One. Vertigo Films teamed up with Film4 and Ingenious Media in January 2008, to form a sales company called Protagonist Pictures. They also owned a post production company in Berlin called The Post Republic.

Its first two shows, Britannia and Bulletproof, were commissioned by Sky, with both programmes renewed for a second series. In May 2021 Bulletproof was cancelled by Sky following extensive allegations of on-set bullying and sexual misconduct against actor and executive producer Noel Clarke.

== Filmography ==
=== Television shows ===
Title	Broadcast date	Executive Producers	Broadcaster	Seasons	Episodes
Britannia	18 January 2018	Jez Butterworth, Tom Butterworth, James Richardson	Sky Atlantic	3	27
Bulletproof	15 May 2018	Noel Clarke, Ashley Walters, Nick Love, Allan Niblo	Sky One	3	17
A Town Called Malice	16 March 2023	Paul Gilbert, Jane Moore, Peter Welter Soler	Sky Max	1	8
Curfew	10 October 2024	Allan Niblo, Nathalie Peter-Contesse	Paramount Plus	1	6

=== Released films ===
Film	Release date	Director	Production company(s)	Type
The Football Factory	14 May 2004	Nick Love	Rockstar Games	Production, Distribution
A Good Woman	13 May 2005	Mike Barker	Beyond Films	Distribution
It's All Gone Pete Tong	27 May 2005	Michael Dowse	True West Films / Redbus Film Distribution	Production
Clean	1 July 2005	Olivier Assayas	UK Film Council / Arte France Cinéma / Canal+ / Téléfilm Canada	Distribution
The Business	2 September 2005	Nick Love	Monkey Productions S.L. / Powder Films / Pathé	Production
Pusher II	16 September 2005	Nicolas Winding Refn	Billy's People / Nordisk Film	Distribution
Stoned	18 November 2005	Stephen Woolley	Number 9 Films / Finola Dwyer Productions	Distribution
Pusher 3	9 June 2006	Nicolas Winding Refn	Det Danske Filminstitut / Nordisk Film / TV2 Danmark / NWR Film Productions	Distribution
Dirty Sanchez: The Movie	22 September 2006	Jim Hickey	MTV Europe	Production
London to Brighton	1 December 2006	Paul Andrew Williams	Steel Mill Pictures / Wellington Films / LTB Films Limited	Distribution
Outlaw	9 March 2007	Nick Love	Pathé / Ingenious Film Partners	Production, Distribution
Joe Strummer: The Future Is Unwritten	18 May 2007	Julien Temple	Parallel Film Productions / FilmFour / Nitrate Films	Distribution
Sparkle	17 August 2007	Tom Hunsinger	Isle of Man Film / Magic Light Pictures	Distribution
WΔZ	20 August 2007	Tom Shankland	UK Film Council / Ingenious Film Partners	Production, Distribution
Shotgun Stories	19 October 2007	Jeff Nichols	A Lucky Old Sun Production / Muskat Filmed Properties / Upload Films	Distribution
In the Shadow of the Moon	2 November 2007	David Sington	Discovery Films / FilmFour / Passion Pictures	Distribution
Shrooms	23 November 2007	Paddy Breathnach	Capitol Films / Ingenious Film Partners / Nepenthe Film	Distribution
Outpost	16 May 2008	Steve Barker	Black Camel Pictures / Regent Capital	Distribution
In Search of a Midnight Kiss	13 June 2008	Alex Holdridge	Midnight Kiss Productions	Distribution
The Escapist	20 June 2008	Rupert Wyatt	Picture Farm / Parallel Film Productions	Distribution
Faintheart	20 September 2008	Vito Rocco	MySpace / Screen West Midlands / Slingshot Productions	Distribution, Production
Summer	5 December 2008	Kenneth Glenaan	UK Film Council / EM Media	Distribution
The Children	5 December 2008	Tom Shankland	Aramid Entertainment / Barnsnape Films / BBC Films	Production
Dogging: A Love Story	25 January 2009	Simon Ellis		Production
Bronson	13 March 2009	Nicolas Winding Refn	Aramid Entertainment / Str8jacket Creations / EM Media / Perfume Films	Distribution, Production
French Film	15 May 2009	Jackie Oudney	Slingshot Productions / APT Films / IWC Media / Met Film Production	Distribution
Doghouse	12 June 2009	Jake West	Carnaby International	Distribution
Chiko	21 August 2009	Özgür Yildirim	Corazón International / Norddeutscher Rundfunk	Distribution
The Firm	18 September 2009	Nick Love	Warner Bros.	Production
The Cove	23 October 2009	Louie Psihoyos	Diamond Docs / Fish Films / Oceanic Preservation Society / Participant Media / Quickfire Films	Distribution
1 Day	6 November 2009	Penny Woolcock	Blast! Films / Screen West Midlands	Distribution
Humpday	18 December 2009	Lynn Shelton	Seashel Pictures	Distribution
Monsters	13 March 2010	Gareth Edwards	Protagonist Pictures	Production, Distribution
Boogie Woogie	16 April 2010	Duncan Ward	The Works International / S Films / Constance Media / Muse Productions	Distribution
Valhalla Rising	30 April 2010	Nicolas Winding Refn	Nimbus Film / One Eye Production	Distribution
StreetDance 3D	21 May 2010	Max Giwa and Dania Pasquini	BBC Films	Production, Distribution
Ajami	18 June 2010	Scandar Copti and Yaron Shani	Inosan Productions / Twenty Twenty Vision Filmproduction	Distribution
Jackboots on Whitehall	8 October 2010	McHenry Brothers	Entertainment Motion Pictures / Swipe Films / uFilm	Distribution
Outcast	10 December 2010	Colm McCarthy	Bankside Films	Distribution
Wake Wood	25 March 2011	David Keating	Hammer Film Productions / Spitfire Pictures / Fantastic Films	Distribution
Point Blank	10 June 2011	Fred Cavayé	LGM Films / Gaumont / TF1 Films / K.R. Productions	Distribution
Horrid Henry: The Movie	29 July 2011	Nick Moore	Novel Entertainment / UK Film Council / Prescience	Production, Distribution
A Night in the Woods	29 August 2011	Richard Parry		Production
Tucker & Dale vs. Evil	23 September 2011	Eli Craig	Reliance Big Pictures / Loubyloo Productions	Distribution
Retreat	14 October 2011	Carl Tibbetts	Ripple World Pictures	Distribution
StreetDance 2	30 March 2012	Michael Dowse	BBC Films	Production, Distribution
The Facility	23 June 2012	Ian Clark	Incendiary Pictures	Production
What If	25 June 2012	Max Giwa and Dania Pasquini		Production, Distribution
Top Cat: The Movie	1 June 2012	Alberto Mar	Ánima Estudios / Illusion Studios / Lightning Entertainment International	Distribution
The Sweeney	12 September 2012	Nick Love	Embargo Films / Exponential Films	Production
Pusher	12 October 2012	Luis Prieto	Embargo Films	Production, Distribution
Spring Breakers	5 April 2013	Harmony Korine	Muse Productions / Iconoclast / MJZ	Distribution
All Stars	3 May 2013	Ben Gregor		Production, Distribution
Hammer of the Gods	30 May 2013	Farren Blackburn	TV Puls	Production
A Haunted House	19 June 2013	Michael Tiddes	Open Road Films / IM Global / Baby Way Productions	Distribution
Spike Island	21 June 2013	Mat Whitecross	Bankside Films / Fiesta Productions	Distribution
Hawking	20 September 2013	Stephen Finnigan	Darlow Smithson Productions	Distribution
Powder Room	6 December 2013	M.J. Delaney	DJ Films	Distribution
Walking on Sunshine	27 June 2014	Max Giwa and Dania Pasquini	IM Global	Production, Distribution
Pudsey: The Movie	13 July 2014	Nick Moore	Syco Entertainment	Production, Distribution
The Unbeatables	15 August 2014	Juan José Campanella	Antena 3 Films	Distribution
The Last Showing	22 August 2014	Phil Hawkins	The Philm Company / Little Fish Films	Distribution
Monsters: Dark Continent	9 October 2014	Tom Green	Between the Eyes / International Traders	Production, Distribution
Moomins on the Riviera	22 May 2015	Xavier Picard	Handle Productions / Pictak Cie	Distribution
Sword of Vengeance	29 May 2015	Jim Weedon		Production, Distribution
Maggie	24 July 2015	Henry Hobson	Lionsgate / Grindstone Entertainment Group / Gold Star Films	Distribution
The Diary of a Teenage Girl	7 August 2015	Marielle Heller	Caviar / Cold Iron Pictures	Distribution
Bill	18 September 2015	Richard Bracewell	Punk Cinema / Cowboy Films / BBC Films	Distribution
Black Souls	30 October 2015	Francesco Munzi	Cinemaundici / Rai Cinema	Distribution
Welcome to Me	25 March 2016	Shira Piven	Bron Studios / Gary Sanchez Productions	Distribution
The Sweeney: Paris	15 April 2016	Benjamin Rocher	SND Films	Production
Ratchet & Clank	28 April 2016	Kevin Munroe and Jericca Cleland	Rainmaker Entertainment	Distribution
Kill Command	13 May 2016	Steven Gomez		Production, Distribution
Learning to Drive	10 June 2016	Isabel Coixet		Distribution
American Hero	19 June 2016	Nick Love		Production, Distribution
Baskin	24 June 2016	Can Evrenol	XYZ Films	Distribution
400 Days	19 August 2016	Matt Osterman	Content Media / New Artists Alliance	Distribution
Black	19 August 2016	Adil El Arbi and Bilall Fallah		Distribution
Hunt for the Wilderpeople	16 September 2016	Taika Waititi	Piki Films / Defender Films / Curious Film	Distribution
31	23 September 2016	Rob Zombie	PalmStar Media / Protagonist Pictures	Distribution
Under the Shadow	30 September 2016	Babak Anvari		Distribution
Ethel & Ernest	28 October 2016	Roger Mainwood	BBC / BFI / Film Fund Luxembourg / Ffilm Cymru Wales	Distribution
100 Streets	11 November 2016	James O'Hanlon		Distribution
Indignation	18 November 2016	James Schamus	Likely Story / RT Features	Distribution
Chi-Raq	2 December 2016	Spike Lee	Amazon Studios / 40 Acres and a Mule Filmworks	Distribution
Snowden	9 December 2016	Oliver Stone	Endgame Entertainment	Distribution
The Young Offenders	13 January 2017	Peter Foott	Screen Ireland	Distribution
iBoy	27 January 2017	Adam Randall	XYZ Films / Netflix	Distribution
The Time of Their Lives	10 March 2017	Roger Goldby	Bright Pictures	Distribution
Another Mother's Son	24 March 2017	Christopher Menaul	Bill Kenwright Films	Distribution
The Belko Experiment	21 April 2017	Greg McLean	BH Tilt / Orion Pictures / The Safran Company	Distribution
Jawbone	12 May 2017	Thomas Napper	EMU Films / Revolution Films	Distribution
The Secret Scripture	19 May 2017	Jim Sheridan		Distribution
Dough	2 June 2017	John Goldschmidt		Distribution
The Last Word	7 July 2017	Mark Pellington	Myriad Pictures	Distribution
Wish Upon	28 July 2017	John R. Leonetti	Broad Green Pictures	Distribution
Final Portrait	18 August 2017	Stanley Tucci		Distribution
Stratton	1 September 2017	Simon West		Distribution
Goon: Last of the Enforcers	8 September 2017	Jay Baruchel		Distribution
Killing Ground	29 September 2017	Damien Power		Distribution
Boy	13 October 2017	Taika Waititi		Distribution
Base	27 October 2017	Richard Parry	Infinite Wisdom Studios	Production
The Dinner	8 December 2017	Oren Moverman		Distribution
Menashe	8 December 2017	Joshua Z. Weinstein		Distribution
The Prince of Nothingwood	15 December 2017	Sonia Kronlund		Distribution
Brad's Status	5 January 2018	Mike White	Amazon Studios / Plan B Entertainment / Sidney Kimmel Entertainment	Distribution
Mom and Dad	9 March 2018	Brian Taylor	The Fyzz Facility / XYZ Films	Distribution
Mark Felt: The Man Who Brought Down the White House	23 March 2018	Peter Landesman	Scott Free Productions	Distribution
Death Wish	6 April 2018	Eli Roth		Distribution
The Strangers: Prey at Night	4 May 2018	Johannes Roberts	thefyzz	Distribution
Every Day	4 May 2018	Michael Sucsy	Likely Story / Orion Pictures	Distribution
Revenge	11 May 2018	Coralie Fargeat		Distribution
Overboard	22 June 2018	Rob Greenberg		Distribution
The Bookshop	29 June 2018	Isabel Coixet		Distribution
Swimming with Men	6 July 2018	Oliver Parker		Distribution
The Escape	3 August 2018	Dominic Savage	Shoebox Films	Distribution
The Domestics	10 August 2018	Mike P. Nelson		Distribution
The Miseducation of Cameron Post	7 September 2018	Desiree Akhavan		Distribution
The Intent 2: The Come Up	21 September 2018	Femi Oyeniran		Distribution
Fahrenheit 11/9	19 October 2018	Michael Moore	Dog Eat Dog Films	Distribution
Hell Fest	16 November 2018	Gregory Plotkin	Valhalla Motion Pictures	Distribution
Anna and the Apocalypse	30 November 2018	John McPhail		Distribution
Piercing	22 February 2019	Nicolas Pesce		Distribution
The Hole in the Ground	1 March 2019	Lee Cronin		Distribution
The Prodigy	15 March 2019	Nicholas McCarthy	XYZ Films / Orion Pictures	Distribution
Five Feet Apart	22 March 2019	Justin Baldoni		Distribution
Motherhood	29 March 2019	Marianna Palka		Distribution
Bel Canto	26 April 2019	Paul Weitz		Distribution
Destination Wedding	10 May 2019	Victor Levin	thefyzz	Distribution
Thunder Road	31 May 2019	Jim Cummings		Distribution
The Hummingbird Project	14 June 2019	Kim Nguyen		Distribution
Child's Play	21 June 2019	Lars Klevberg	Bron Studios / Orion Pictures	Distribution
Tell It to the Bees	19 July 2019	Annabel Jankel		Distribution
Mrs Lowry & Son	30 August 2019	Adrian Noble		Distribution
Corpus Christi	18 October 2019	Jan Komasa		Distribution
After the Wedding	1 November 2019	Bart Freundlich	Ingenious Media	Distribution
The Nightingale	29 November 2019	Jennifer Kent	Bron Studios	Distribution
The Assistant	31 January 2020	Kitty Green	Cinereach	Distribution
Villain	28 February 2020	Philip Barantini		Distribution
Vivarium	27 March 2020	Lorcan Finnegan	XYZ Films	Distribution
The Wretched	8 May 2020	Brett and Drew T. Pierce		Distribution
Resistance	19 June 2020	Jonathan Jakubowicz		Distribution
Saint Frances	4 July 2020	Alex Thompson		Distribution
100% Wolf	31 July 2020	Alexs Stadermann		Distribution
The Vigil	31 July 2020	Keith Thomas		Distribution
Gretel & Hansel	3 August 2020	Oz Perkins	Bron Studios / Orion Pictures	Distribution
Pinocchio	7 August 2020	Matteo Garrone	Archimede / Rai Cinema	Distribution
Sputnik	14 August 2020	Egor Abramenko	Art Pictures Studio	Distribution
Miss Juneteenth	18 September 2020	Channing Godfrey Peoples		Distribution
Becky	28 September 2020	Jonathan Milott & Cary Murnion		Distribution
I Am Woman	9 October 2020	Unjoo Moon		Distribution
Host	4 December 2020	Rob Savage		Distribution
The Racer	18 December 2020	Kieron J. Walsh		Distribution
Sound of Metal	29 January 2021	Darius Marder		Distribution
Minamata	12 February 2021	Andrew Levitas		Distribution
Crimes of the Future	9 September 2022	David Cronenberg	Neon / Metropolitan Filmexport / Argonauts Productions S.A. / Serendipity Point Films / Davis Films / Telefilm Canada / Ingenious Media / Bell Media / CBC / Ekome / Natixis Coficiné	Distribution
Looney Tunes: The Day The Earth Blew Up	13 February 2026	Peter Browngardt	Warner Bros. Animation	Distribution

== Awards ==
It's All Gone Pete Tong:

- Best Canadian Feature – Toronto International Film Festival – 2004
- Best Feature – US Comedy Arts Festival – 2005
- Best Actor (Paul Kaye) – US Comedy Arts Festival – 2005
- Grand Jury Award – Gen Art Film Festival – 2005
- Audience Award – Gen Art Film Festival – 2005
- Best British Columbian Film – Vancouver Film Critics Circle – 2005
- Best Male Performer' (Mike Wilmot) – Canadian Comedy Awards – 2005
- Best Overall Sound – Leo Awards – 2005
- Best Sound Editing – Leo Awards – 2005
- Best Feature-Length Drama – Leo Awards – 2005

Clean:

- Best Actress (Maggie Cheung) – Cannes Film Festival – 2004

London to Brighton:

- Best Achievement in Production – British Independent Film Awards – 2006
- Golden Hitchcock (Paul Andrew Williams) – Dinard Festival of British Cinema – 2006
- New Director's Award (Paul Andrew Williams) – Edinburgh International Film Festival – 2006
- Most Promising Newcomer (Paul Andrew Williams) – Evening Standard British Film Awards – 2007
- Best Feature Film – Foyle Film Festival – 2006
- Jury Prize (UK Feature) – Raindance Film Festival – 2006

Shotgun Stories:

- New American Cinema Award – Seattle International Film Festival – 2007

Bronson:

- Best Actor Tom Hardy – British Independent Film Awards – 2009
- Best Film – Sydney Film Festival – 2009

Monsters:

- Best International Film – Saturn Award —2011
- Best First Film – Austin Film Critics Association – 2010
- Best Achievement in Production – British Independent Film Awards – 2010
- Best Director – British Independent Film Awards – 2010
- Best Technical Achievement Gareth Edwards For visual effects – British Independent Film Awards – 2010
- Best Technical/Artistic Achievement Gareth Edwards For the Cinematography, Production Design and Visual Effects – Evening Standard British Film Awards – 2010
- Breakthrough British Filmmaker for Gareth Edwards – London Film Critics' Circle – 2011
- Top Independent Films – National Board of Review of Motion Pictures – 2010
