= Bulletproof (TV series) =

British police comedy-drama television series

- Genre: Action; Crime comedy-drama; Police procedural
- Created by: Noel Clarke; Ashley Walters; Nick Love
- Starring: Noel Clarke; Ashley Walters; Christina Chong; Lashana Lynch; Mandeep Dhillon; David Elliot; Jason Maza; Caroline Goodall; Clarke Peters; Lindsey Coulson; Lucie Shorthouse; Olivia Chenery
- Opening theme: "All Goes Wrong" by Chase & Status featuring Tom Grennan
- Composer: Lorne Balfe
- Country of origin: United Kingdom
- Original language: English
- No. of series: 3
- No. of episodes: 17

Production
- Executive producers: Michele Buck; Judy Counihan; Nick Love; Allan Niblo
- Producer: Jonathan Finn
- Cinematography: Sergio Delgado
- Editors: Richard Graham; Simon Brase; Matthew Tabern
- Running time: 42 minutes
- Production companies: Vertigo Films; Company Pictures

Original release
- Network: Sky One
- Release: 15 May 2018 – 3 February 2021

Bulletproof is a British police procedural television series, created by and starring Noel Clarke and Ashley Walters, that first broadcast on Sky One on 15 May 2018. Produced by Vertigo Films and Company Pictures, the series follows NCA detectives, and best friends, Aaron Bishop (Clarke) and Ronnie Pike Jr. (Walters), who investigate some of the country's most dangerous criminals, including traffickers, drug dealers and armed robbers, whilst being overseen by their boss Sarah Tanner (Lindsey Coulson).

The series was co-created and principally written by scriptwriter and director Nick Love, who was approached by Sky to work on the series following his work on the 2012 remake of The Sweeney. Walters and Clarke commented to Deadline Hollywood that the series was inspired by films such as Lethal Weapon and Bad Boys, quoting that "the humour and funny moments come from the relationships between the characters." The series' opening theme, "All Goes Wrong", was also personally chosen by Clarke and Walters. The complete series was released on DVD on 23 July 2018. Worldwide distribution is handled by Sky Vision.

On 19 June 2018, the day of the series one finale, a second series consisting of seven episodes was confirmed. Sky TV announced in December 2019 that the second series would air on 20 March 2020. Further, in August 2019 it was announced that a new three-part special would be broadcast in autumn 2020. The special began airing on 20 January 2021, with all episodes released for on-demand viewing. It sees Bishop and Pike journeying to South Africa to investigate the country's criminal underworld.

On 15 January 2021, five days before the third series premiered, Bulletproof was renewed for a fourth series. The series was set to consist of eight episodes; filming had been scheduled to begin later in the year. However, following allegations against Clarke in late April 2021 of sexual misconduct and bullying, filming was suspended, and makers Vertigo said they would investigate whether any of the allegations related to their productions. In May 2021, the series was officially cancelled by Sky One.

== Synopsis ==
Aaron Bishop (Noel Clarke) and Ronnie Pike (Ashley Walters) are childhood friends, albeit from very different backgrounds. Ronnie is from a high-achieving middle-class family with a history in the police, with his father now working as Director-General of the National Crime Agency. Bishop, however, grew up in foster homes and on the streets. Despite their differences, they retain a close fraternal bond and work together as detectives for the National Crime Agency in London, dealing with serious organised crime.

== Cast ==
=== Main ===
- Noel Clarke as Aaron "Bish" Bishop; an NCA Detective Inspector
- Ashley Walters as Ronald "Ronnie" Pike Jr; an NCA Detective Inspector
- Lindsey Coulson as Sarah Tanner; an NCA Detective Chief Inspector
- Jason Maza as Chris Munroe; an NCA Detective Sergeant
- David Elliot as Tim "Jonesy" Jones; an NCA Detective Sergeant (series 1–2)
- Christina Chong as Nell McBride; an NCA Detective Sergeant (series 1)
- Mandeep Dhillon as Kamali Khan; an NCA Detective Constable (series 1)
- Olivia Chenery as Scarlett 'Scooch' Hailton; an NCA Detective Inspector (series 2–3)
- Lucie Shorthouse as Paige Pennington; an NCA Detective Constable (series 2–3)
- Clarke Peters as Ronald Pike Sr; Pike's father and the Director-General of the National Crime Agency (series 1)
- Lee Ross as Richard Cockridge; Deputy Director of the NCA (series 2)
- Lashana Lynch (series 1) / Vanessa Vanderpuye (series 2–3) as Arjana Pike; Ronnie's solicitor wife
- Jodie Campbell as Ali Pike; Ronnie and Arjana's oldest daughter
- Florisa Kamara as Donna Pike; Ronnie and Arjana's youngest daughter
- David Chabeaux as Kev; an NCA Detective Constable (series 1)

=== Recurring ===
- Caroline Goodall as Charlotte Carmel; Deputy Mayor of London (series 1)
- Emma Rigby as Dr. Sophie Latimer; Bishop's girlfriend (series 1)
- Gala Gordon as Anna Markides (series 2)
- Stavros Zalmas as Alex Markides (series 2)
- Ben Tavassoli as Mikey Markides (series 2)
- Gina Bellman as Eleanor Markides (series 2)
- Marcus Rutherford as Dezzy

== Episodes ==
Series	Episodes	Originally released	
Series	Episodes	First released	Last released
1	6	15 May 2018	19 June 2018
2	8	20 March 2020	1 May 2020
3	3	20 January 2021	3 February 2021

=== Series 1 (2018) ===
No. overall	No. in series	Title	Directed by	Written by	Original release date	UK viewers (millions)
1	1	Episode 1	Nick Love	Nick Love	15 May 2018	1.59
One of Bishop and Pike's informants offers up information about a criminal gang stealing high-end cars in London. As she walks away from their meeting, she is knocked down by a hit and run driver who then reverses over her body, killing her. Determined to get justice, the pair discover a potential location from where the gang may be operating and organise a raid. The bust goes badly wrong resulting in Nell and Jonesy being kidnapped. Hot on the tail of the kidnappers, Bishop opens fire, with devastating results.
2	2	Episode 2	Nick Love	Nick Love	22 May 2018	1.12
When wanted criminal Michael Sharp turns up out of the blue, having been out of the country for several years, Bishop and Pike are led to the scene of a safety deposit box robbery, where Sharp once again appears to be the criminal mastermind. Determined to bring their nemesis to justice once and for all, Bishop and Pike trail Sharp out into the countryside, where they suspect he is hiding out. Whilst confronting Sharp, Bishop and Pike are led into a shootout with an armed gang who then decide to run them off the road.
3	3	Episode 3	Nick Love	Nick Love & Richard Zajdlic	29 May 2018	1.04
Bishop and Pike are thrown off the Sharp case, but remain determined to investigate. Pike heads into prison to speak with one of Sharp's former associates, Jason Woods, with whom he committed a series of robberies, much to the annoyance of Tanner. In the meantime, the team are tasked with investigating a gang of drug dealers using local kids as runners. Bishop uses sneaky tactics to discover the location of the warehouse where the drugs are being produced, but the bust takes an unexpected turn when Kamali is shot.
4	4	Episode 4	Ole Endresen	Mark Greig & Richard Zajdlic	5 June 2018	1.12
Following Jason Woods' murder, Pike and Bishop go in search of the gun dealer, but unexpectedly stumble upon a sex trafficking ring when they find a young immigrant girl locked in the boot of a car. Pike sympathises with her father, Bakur, who claims that the girl died after being tortured. When Bishop offers to drop Pike's daughter off at school and she later disappears, Pike learns she has been taken by Bakur and his gang as leverage to prevent Pike from finding out his true identity.
5	5	Episode 5	Ole Endresen	Nick Love	12 June 2018	1.01
Pike and his family are forced to accept witness protection following Bakur's threat. Pike considers his future and informs Bishop that he intends to resign. Bishop, undeterred, goes on a one man mission to find Bakur. Whilst also trying to work his way back onto the Sharp investigation, Bishopsecret discovers a link between Sharp and Pike's father. Pike has to face the possibility that his father may have been involved in corrupt activity. Meanwhile, Bishop and Nell finally give into temptation and spend the night together.
6	6	Episode 6	Ole Endresen	Noel Clarke & Mark Greig	19 June 2018	0.88
With Pike's father seriously ill in hospital, Bishop continues to quiz Borlock on the file containing pictures of Pike Snr. and Sharp. He discovers that the pair were part of an undercover unit known as 'Black Heart', tasked with infiltrating gangs perpetrating high profile crimes including armed robbery, drug dealing and trafficking. When the hitman responsible for shooting Pike Snr. escapes from custody, Bishop and Pike track him to City Hall, where he has taken the Deputy Mayor and Pike's wife hostage.

=== Series 2 (2020) ===
No. overall	No. in series	Title	Directed by	Written by	Original release date	UK viewers (millions)
7	1	Episode 1	Diarmuid Goggins	Nick Love	20 March 2020	0.348
A routine drugs bust has unexpected results for the team when they discover £1,000,000 hidden in a holdhall in one of the dealer's cars. Investigations lead them to the Markides family, whose former matriarch, Eleanor, is an old acquaintance of Tanner's. Bishop goes undercover, posing as a drug dealer, to help the family plan a raid on the police warehouse to retrieve the stolen money.
8	2	Episode 2	Diarmuid Goggins	Nick Love	27 March 2020	0.715
Paige and Scooch are tasked with looking for a missing girl, and discover that she was involved with a local modelling agency run by a mysterious figure only known as Patrick Striker. When they uncover links to the Markides' family, Pike joins Bishop undercover.
9	3	Episode 3	Diarmuid Goggins	Noel Clarke	3 April 2020	0.656
The team are deployed to Amsterdam, where Bishop and Pike oversee a planned deal between Eleanor and a gang of sex traffickers from Hong Kong. A shootout on the Amsterdam docks nearly results in the pair's cover being blown.
10	4	Episode 4	Dominic LeClerc	Richard Zajdlic	10 April 2020	0.738
Pike and Bishop discover that Mikey has links to a gun-running operation spearheaded by an anonymous figure known only as 'Reppas 42'. The pair's trail leads them to a nearby racecourse, where they discover a warehouse full of 3D printed weapons and a team of angered ex-soldiers ready for battle.
11	5	Episode 5	Dominic LeClerc	Nick Love	17 April 2020	0.888
Thrust right into the centre of the Markides' operation in Cyprus, Bishop revells in winning Alex's trust. Back on home soil, Tanner's attempts to get Eleanor to turn the tables on her family have unexpected results.
12	6	Episode 6	Dominic LeClerc	Jerome Bucchan-Nelson	24 April 2020	0.813
With Bishop and Pike's cover blown, they are forced to plead for their lives, but an unforgiving Alex and Mikey have other ideas. As Pike manages to break free from their clutches, he mounts a rescue operation to save Bishop, but the ensuing chaos ends in tragedy.
13	7	Episode 7	Sarmad Masud	Nick Love & Ashley Walters	1 May 2020	0.670
Bishop continues his own investigation into the Markides family, despite warnings from Cockridge. Pike's latest case involves the boyfriend of his daughter Ali, who has become the latest victim of a gang war involving up-and-coming rapper iDubz and a rival crew.
14	8	Episode 8	Sarmad Masud	Jerome Bucchan-Nelson & Noel Clarke	1 May 2020	0.687
Bishop enlists a suspended Tanner's help to mount an operation to catch Alex and Mikey, but Cockridge is left with egg on his face after assuming control and bungling a raid on the flat where the pair are suspected to be hiding. Bishop uses his connection to Anna to his advantage.

=== Series 3 (2021) ===
No. overall	No. in series	Title	Directed by	Written by	Original release date	UK viewers (millions)
15	1	Episode 1	Sarmad Masud	Nick Love	20 January 2021	0.674
Pike and Bishop escape London for a break in South Africa. They are soon drawn into a kidnapping case involving a friend Pike's daughter has made. The girl's father is asked to rob his company’s vault in order to get his daughter back.
16	2	Episode 2	Sarmad Masud	Jerome Bucchan-Nelson	27 January 2021	0.473
Pike and Bishop must use all their smarts to survive a stay in a grotty South African prison. The clues start to mount in the kidnapping case.
17	3	Episode 3	Sarmad Masud	Nick Love	3 February 2021	0.459
The police lay siege to the kidnappers but something about their success doesn't sit right with Bishop. Final part of the South Africa special.

== International broadcast ==
Bulletproof premiered in the US on The CW in August 2019. The series returned to the network for the second season in June 2020, and then the following year for the third season in March 2021. The series was pulled from the network's streaming and on-demand platforms on 30 April 2021 after the allegations against Clarke were revealed.

In Australia, the series premiered on Foxtel on 1 September 2019.

In Canada, the series premiered on Showcase on 30 September 2020.

== Bulletproof: The Interrogation ==
On 3 April 2020, Sky TV released Bulletproof: The Interrogation, an interactive film in which Clarke and Walters reprise their roles from the original series. Created through Charisma.ai software, the viewer is able to interact with multiple characters through typing and using their microphone. The aim of the film is to try and prevent a captured serial killer from killing his next victim.
