= American Hero =

American Hero may refer to:

- American Hero (novel), written by Larry Beinhart
- American Hero (film), a 2015 American-British film
- American Hero (video game), a cancelled interactive movie game for Atari Jaguar
- American Heroes, a book by Oliver North
- American sub or American hero, a sandwich

== See also ==
- The Greatest American Hero, a 1981-1983 American television series
- The Last American Hero, a 1973 sports film based on the true story of Junior Johnson
