= Tamer Hassan =

British adult actor (born 1968)

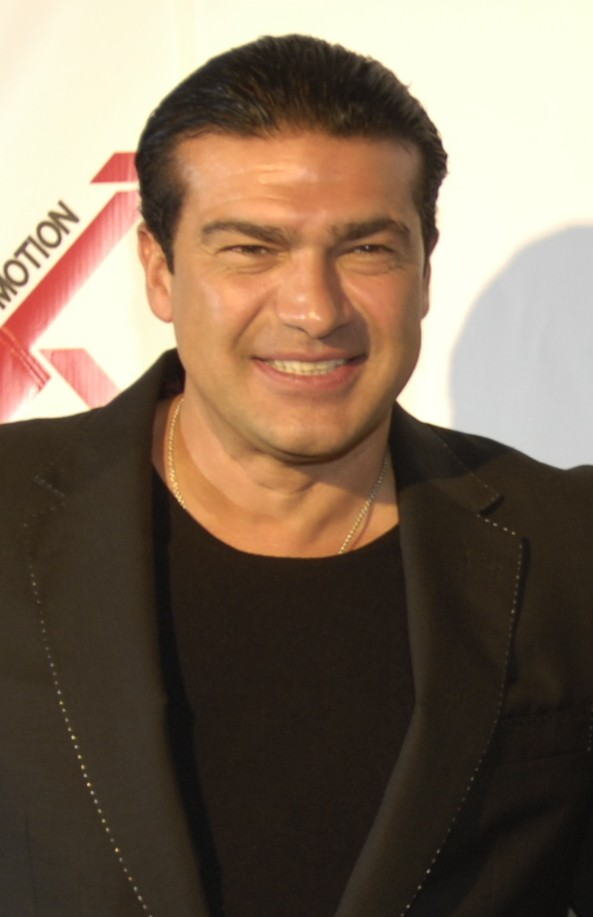
- Hassan at the Blood Out premiere in 2011
- Born: 18 March 1968 (age 58); New Cross, London, England
- Occupation: Actor
- Years active: 1987–present
- Children: 2, including Belle
- Website: tamerhassan.com

Tamer Hassan (born 18 March 1968) is a British actor best known for his gritty portrayals of tough guys, gangsters, and enforcers in both British independent cinema and major Hollywood productions. He rose to prominence with leading roles in cult British crime films such as The Football Factory (2004) and The Business (2005), both co-starring Danny Dyer, whom he would go on to collaborate with in a total of six feature films.

Hassan has also appeared in international projects across a wide array of action and horror films. These include starring alongside Jet Li in Unleashed (2005), playing the antagonist Rahood opposite Wesley Snipes in 7 Seconds (2005), and portraying the convict leader Chavez in the slasher sequel Wrong Turn 3: Left for Dead (2009). His other major credits include Christopher Nolan's superhero film Batman Begins (2005), a recurring role as a Dothraki warrior in the HBO fantasy series Game of Thrones (2016), and the portrayal of Carthaginian general Hannibal Barca in the historical television docudrama Hannibal v Rome (2005).

== Early life ==
Hassan was born and brought up in New Cross, London into a Turkish Cypriot family.

Hassan first started working on market stalls at an early age and started boxing at the age of 10. He began an amateur boxing career at the age of 17 where he won two British titles. Having sustained an injury in amateur boxing, he turned to running his own nightclubs and restaurants.

== Career ==
Hassan started acting in television before his role in The Calcium Kid. He was cast as the leader of a fictional football firm in The Football Factory, alongside Danny Dyer and Frank Harper. The film's director Nick Love subsequently cast him in the primary supporting role for The Business.

Hassan has had roles in films including The Ferryman, Batman Begins, Cass, Eastern Promises, and Clash of the Titans, in which he portrayed Ares, the ancient Greek god of war. In 2011, he played "The Boss", a shady police officer, in the British film noir Jack Falls. He played "Chavez" in Wrong Turn 3: Left for Dead.

In 2016 he joined the HBO series Game of Thrones in Season 6 as Khal Forzo.

== Personal life ==
Hassan is married and has two children: a son who is a professional football player, and a daughter, Belle, who appeared in the fifth series of Love Island in 2019 and the third series of Love Island All Stars in 2026.

He is a director of Nasdaq-listed company Lottery.com Inc. He is also a fan of Millwall.

== Filmography ==
Actor
Year	Film	Role	Notes
1987	No Way Out	Officer at Party	
2002	Dju!	Himself	
2002	Judge John Deed	Hussain Husaini	Episode: "Political Expediency"
2003	The Bill	Hasan Ergunsah	Episode: "090"
2004	Murder City	Michael Samuels	Episode: "Big City Small World"
2004	The Calcium Kid	Pete Wright	
2004	Spivs	Villa	
2004	The Football Factory	Fred	
2004	Layer Cake	Terry	
2005	Hannibal v Rome	Hannibal	TV movie
2005	Unleashed (aka Danny the Dog)	Georgie	
2005	Batman Begins	Faden's Limo Driver	
2005	7 Seconds	Rahood	
2005	The Business	Charlie	
2005	Revealed	Hannibal	Episode: "Hannibal of the Alps"
2005	The Comic Strip Presents...	Luccio	Episode: "Sex Actually"
2007	The Ferryman	Dave 'Big Dave'	
2007	Eastern Promises	Chechen Assassin	
2007	The Omid Djalili Show	Himself	2 episodes
2001–2007	Casualty	Stan / Barry Rayfield	2 episodes
2008	Sucker Punch	Del	
2008	West 10 LDN	Gout	TV movie
2008	Beyond the Rave	Rich Crocker	
2008	Cass	Ray	
2008	EastEnders	Ahmet	2 episodes
2009	K	Alberto	
2009	Goal! III	Ronnie	
2009	iD3	Tommaso	
2009	City Rats	Jim	
2009	Hotel Babylon	Gomez	2 episodes
2009	Wrong Turn 3: Left for Dead	Carlos Chavez	
2009	Dead Man Running	Nick Kane	
2010	Kick-Ass	Matthew	
2010	Clash of the Titans	Ares	
2010	The Last Seven	Jack Mason	
2010	Bonded by Blood	Pat Tate	
2010	Magic Boys	Splendid Ben	
2010	Service Man	Corporal Thomas	
2010	Jack Falls	The Boss	
2011	Blood Out	Elias	
2011	Red Faction: Origins	Stoller	
2011	Amoc	Dell	
2011	The Double	Boz	
2011	Freerunner	Reese	
2011	The Hike	Dean	
2011	The Reverend	Harold Hicks	
2010–2015	NCIS	Agah Bayar	4 episodes
2014	24: Live Another Day	Basher	2 episodes
2014	The Hooligan Factory	Jack	Cameo
2015	Robot Overlords	Wayne	
2016	Game of Thrones	Khal Forzo	Episode: "Book of the Stranger"
2016	Bitter Harvest	Sergei	
2016	The Promise	Faruk Pasha	
2016	Plebs	Ptolemy	Episode: "Jugball"
2017–2018	Snatch	Henry 'Hate 'Em All Henry'	Main Cast
2019	Queen of Diamonds	Harris	Short Film
2021	Fork	Dagon	
2022	House Red	Adamo	
2023	The Chelsea Cowboy	Salim	
2024	Celebrity MasterChef	Himself	Contestant
2026	Rise of the Footsoldier: Retribution	Colonel Sullivan	
TBA	Mother for an Hour	Joe	Post Production
TBA	Bad Day at the Office	Soloman	Post Production

Producer
Year	Film	Notes
2009	Dead Man Running	Executive producer
2012	Service Man	Executive producer
2016	Bitter Harvest	Co-producer
