= Danny Dyer =

English actor (born 1977)

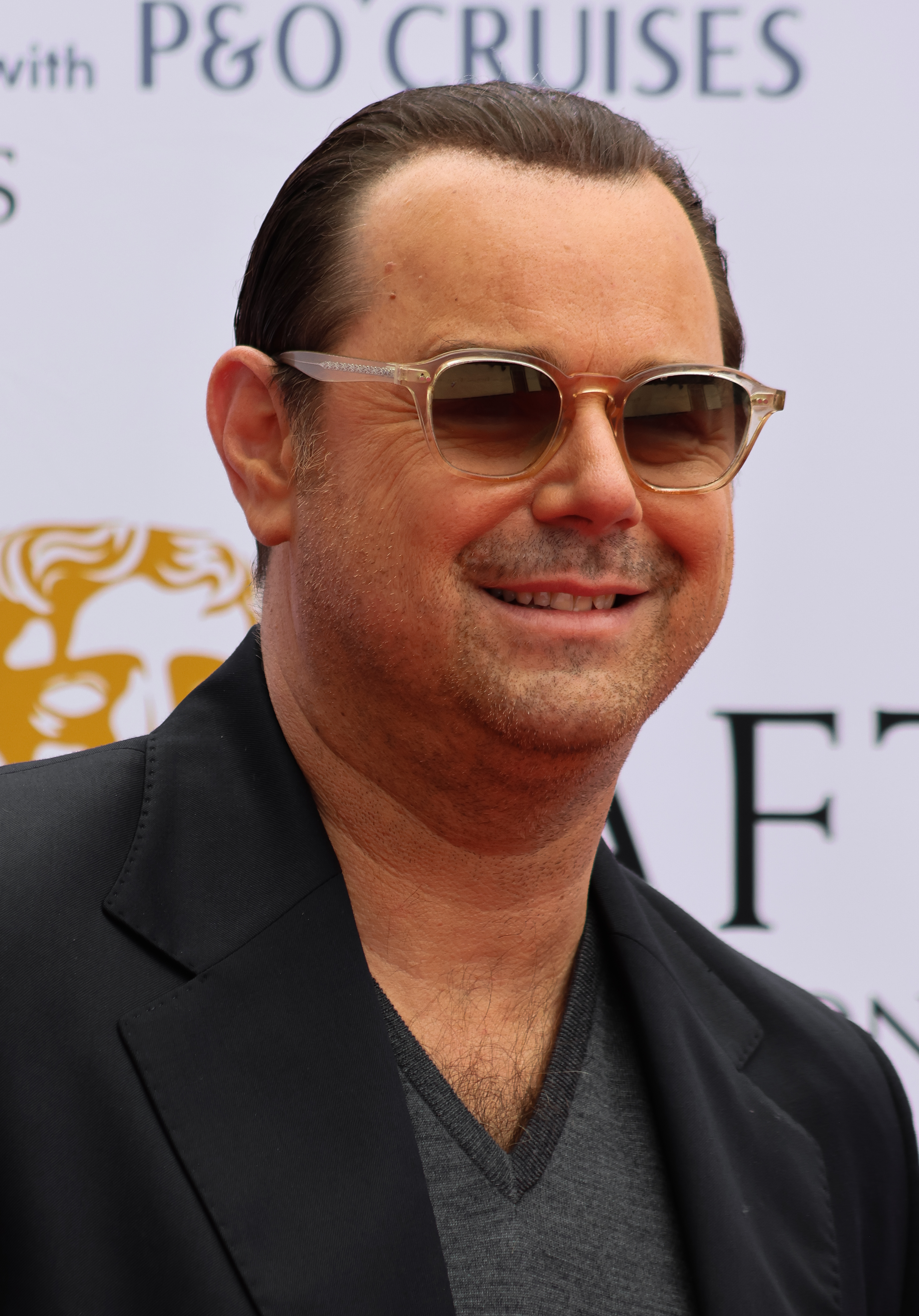
- Dyer in 2026
- Born: Danial John Dyer; 24 July 1977 (age 49); London, England
- Occupations: Actor; presenter
- Years active: 1993–present
- Spouse: Joanne Mas (m. 2016)
- Children: 3, including Dani
- Relatives: Jarrod Bowen (son-in-law)
- Website: dannydyer.com

Danial John Dyer (born 24 July 1977) is an English actor and presenter. Dyer's breakthrough role was as Moff in Human Traffic (1999), with other notable roles Billy the Limpet in Mean Machine (2001) and as Tommy Johnson in The Football Factory (2004). Following the success of The Football Factory, Dyer was often typecast in "hard man" roles, although it was this image that allowed him to present The Real Football Factories, its spin-off, The Real Football Factories International and Danny Dyer's Deadliest Men. Dyer has also worked in theatre, having appeared in three plays written by Harold Pinter, with whom he had a close friendship.

In 2013, Dyer joined the cast of the BBC soap opera EastEnders, in the role of Mick Carter, and remained in the series until 2022. He won the Serial Drama Performance award at the National Television Awards in 2015, 2016, and 2019. From 2019 until 2022, he presented the BBC game show The Wall. Since 2024, he has starred in the television series Mr. Bigstuff and Rivals, winning the British Academy Television Award for Best Male Comedy Performance for the former.

== Early life ==
Danial John Dyer (Note: Given name shown on Dyer's passport in the opening credits of The Real Football Factories International.) (Note: According to his autobiography, Straight Up, his father misspelled his name as "Danial" when filling out his birth registration.) was born in the Custom House area of East London on 24 July 1977, to Christine (née Meakin) and Antony Dyer. He has a younger brother, Tony (born 1979), and sister, Kayleigh (born 1986). His parents split up when he was nine and he was raised by his mother in Custom House. He began acting when he was a teen, and was bullied at school so badly by his peers that he lied about taking acting classes.

In 2016, Dyer's family history was the subject of a Series 13 episode of the BBC genealogy series Who Do You Think You Are?, where it was revealed that his family hails from the Poplar area of London. Census records showed many of them working in the manual occupations connected to the docks on the River Thames. Further research found that Dyer is a descendant of Thomas Cromwell and of Elizabeth Seymour, the sister of Henry VIII's third wife Jane Seymour. Elizabeth married Cromwell's son Gregory Cromwell and, with the Seymour family's assertion to be descended from Edward III (Dyer's 22nd-generation ancestor), the line can be traced back to William the Conqueror and Charlemagne. In response, geneticist Adam Rutherford argued that a British person being descended from a Plantagenet king was "not remarkable", musing that "almost every Briton" can claim such descent.

== Career ==
=== Television ===
Dyer was discovered at a local school by an agent who auditioned him for the part of Martin Fletcher in the Granada Television series Prime Suspect 3 (1993), beginning his acting career at 16. He also appeared on television in episodes of Cadfael (1994), A Touch of Frost (1995), Loved Up (1995), Thief Takers (1996), Highlander and Soldier Soldier (both 1997). His many other television roles include appearances in the 2003 Channel 4 drama Second Generation, directed by John Sen; as Malcolm, main character Michelle's stepfather, in Skins; as a football player in the second series of Hotel Babylon; and as Matt Costello in what was supposed to be the pilot episode for Breathless, a BBC two-part television series in development from BBC Northern Ireland, renamed first Blood Rush and then Kiss of Death, when it premiered on BBC One as a one-part drama on 26 May 2008.

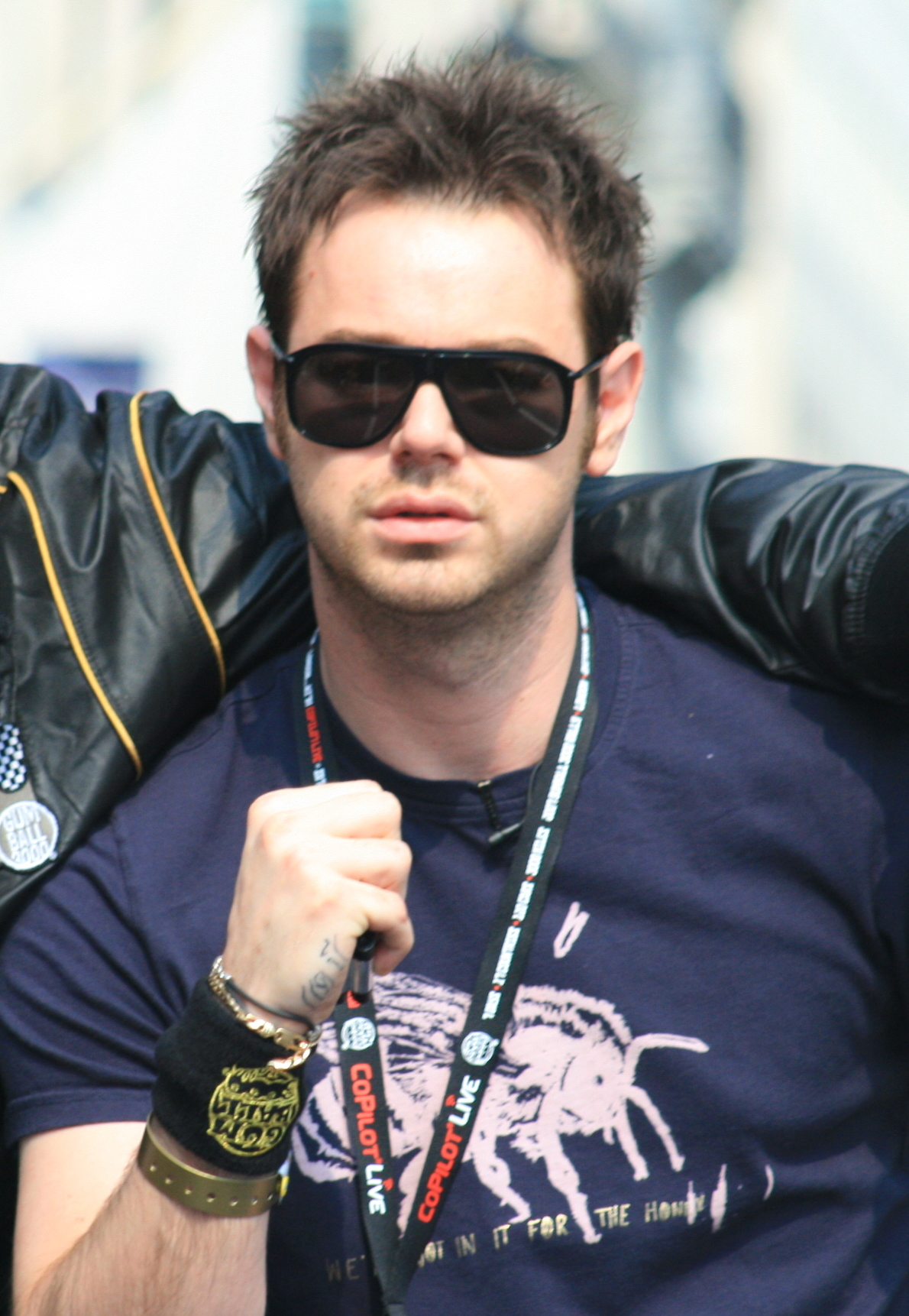
Dyer in 2007

Beginning in 2007, Dyer became the presenter of The Real Football Factories and The Real Football Factories International, a TV documentary series on Bravo, for which he travels, in the former throughout the United Kingdom and in the latter throughout the world, to meet and interview football club fans and hooligans. In Danny Dyer's Deadliest Men, "a gritty and hard-hitting documentary series that sees him venturing into the dark depths of the British underworld and hunting down some of the most notorious and feared men in Britain today", began airing on Bravo in the United Kingdom on 20 October 2008.

In April 2009, he turned down a role in EastEnders, stating that although he thought the role sounded good, he did not think he could cope with the pressure of additional publicity. In his 2010 autobiography Straight Up, he said he would not join the cast until he was "fat, bald and fifty".

In February 2012, Dyer appeared as a paramedic in an episode of Casualty. In March 2013, Dyer appeared as a guest on Celebrity Juice. Dyer appeared in the sixth series of Hollyoaks Later in October 2013, as The White Man. On 1 October 2013, the BBC announced that Dyer had been cast in EastEnders from Christmas 2013, as Mick Carter, the new landlord of The Queen Victoria pub. After he began appearing as Carter, Dyer said that he had been offered and had turned down the part of Carl White, who was eventually played by Daniel Coonan. In February 2017, it was announced that Dyer would be taking a "short break" from EastEnders. In January 2022, it was announced that Dyer had quit EastEnders after over eight years in the role of Mick Carter.

In June 2018, Dyer appeared as a guest panellist on Good Evening Britain, a one-off spin-off show of Good Morning Britain, to discuss Britain's exit from the European Union. Dyer described it as a "mad riddle that no one knows what it is" and called former Prime Minister David Cameron a "twat". In August 2018, Dyer began narrating MTV reality series, True Love or True Lies. In 2019, Dyer appeared in a history documentary, titled Danny Dyer's Right Royal Family. The two-part series premiered on BBC One on 23 January 2019. Also that year, Dyer co-presented True Love or True Lies on MTV alongside daughter Dani, as well as beginning his presenting role on The Wall on BBC One. After he announced his departure from EastEnders, it was subsequently confirmed that Dyer would also be leaving The Wall.

=== Film ===
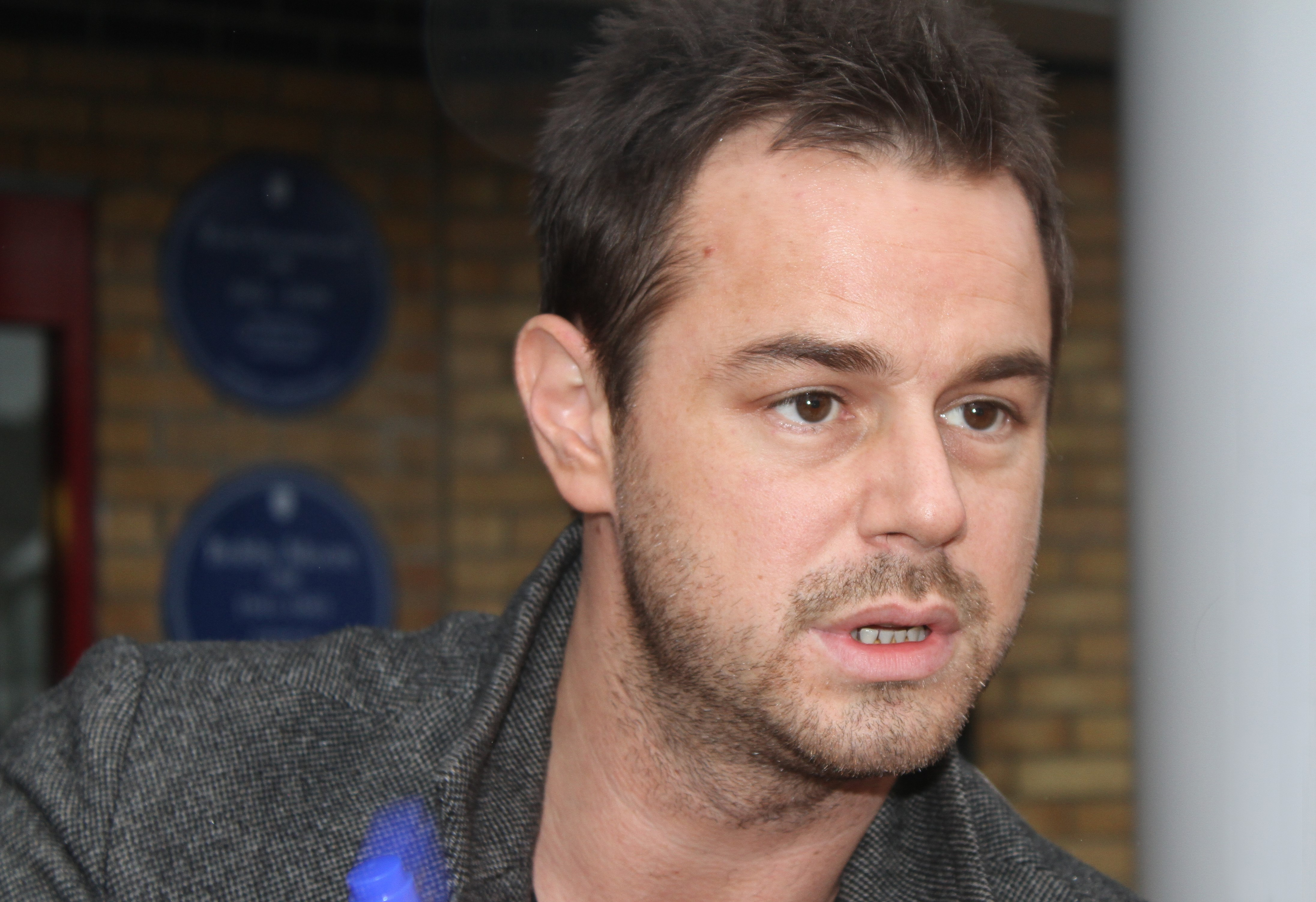
Dyer at Upton Park in 2010

Dyer is known for his "bad boy" or "hard man" roles in film. Dyer's first film role was in Human Traffic (1999). His subsequent movie work includes Mel Smith's High Heels and Low Lifes (2001) and starring roles in Borstal Boy (2000), Mean Machine (2002) and in four films by the British film director Nick Love: Goodbye Charlie Bright (2001); The Football Factory (2004); The Business (2005); and Outlaw (2007). Among other film roles, he also appeared as the character Steve in Christopher Smith's Severance (2006); as Hayden in Adulthood (2008); and as himself in the feature documentary Tattoos: A Scarred History.

In 2008, he finished filming his roles as Pete and Tom in City Rats and 7 Lives, respectively. April 2009 saw the straight to DVD release of City Rats. Later that year, Dyer completed filming on Jack Said, a Brit noir thriller in which he played Nathan alongside Ashlie Walker, Terry Stone, David O'Hara and Simon Phillips, which was released in November 2009. This film is the prequel to Jack Says, which was released in 2008, and starred Mike Reid.

In 2009, he shot several horror films including Doghouse under the direction of Jake West, and Basement under the direction of Asham Kamboj. He played one of the lead roles in the British vampire film Dead Cert. In June 2010, he was cast for the lead role in the remake of the British horror film The Asphyx, but it failed to secure production finance and was indefinitely shelved. Dyer co-starred with Anna Walton in Deviation, a British dark thriller written and directed by J. K. Amalou.

In 2012, Dyer played the lead role in Ray Cooney's Run for Your Wife. Upon release in 2013, it was savaged by critics, who described it as one of the worst British films of all time. The film took in a mere £747 during its opening weekend.

=== Theatre ===
Dyer has performed on stage, most notably in two plays written and directed by 2005 Nobel Laureate Harold Pinter: as the Waiter in the London première of Celebration (2000), at the Almeida Theatre, which transferred to Lincoln Center for the Performing Arts, in New York, as part of the Harold Pinter Festival held there in July and August 2001; and as Foster in the revival of No Man's Land (1975), at the Royal National Theatre, in London, during 2001 and 2002. In March 2008, he played Joey in a revival of Pinter's The Homecoming (1964), directed by Michael Attenborough, at the Almeida Theatre, in London. He also performed in Peter Gill's play Certain Young Men (1999) in London. From 9 September 2009 to 3 October 2009, Dyer appeared as Sid Vicious in a new play called Kurt and Sid in London's West End at the Trafalgar Studios.

=== Selected other work ===
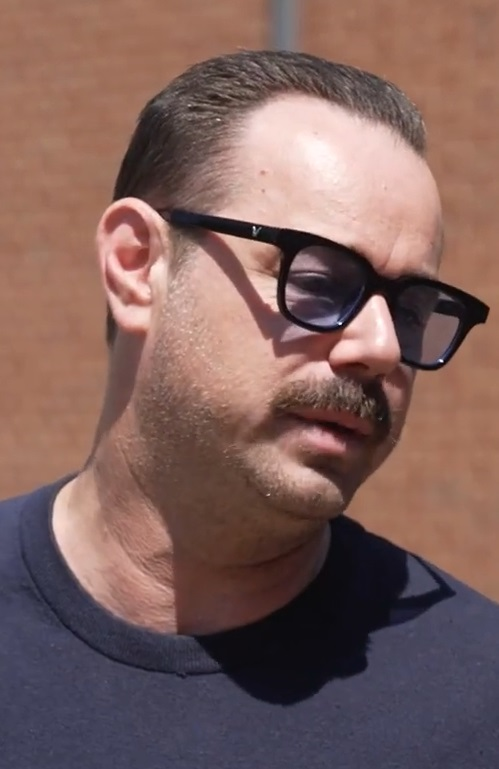
Dyer during 2023 Soccer Aid Training Week

Dyer is the voice of Kent Paul in the video games Grand Theft Auto: Vice City (2002) and Grand Theft Auto: San Andreas (2004). He also appears in The Twang's 2007 video for "Two Lovers".

I Believe in UFOs: Danny Dyer, a documentary that sees Dyer journey to various "UFO hotspots" in the UK and the US in hope of experiencing a UFO sighting, was broadcast on BBC Three on 26 January 2010. In 2016, he appeared in drag in the Lucy Rose music video for "Nebraska". In 2020, he began co-hosting Sorted with the Dyers, a podcast alongside daughter Dani.

In 2021, along with Will Mellor, Dyer recorded a new version of "Vindaloo" for NHS Charities. In January 2022, Dyer quit EastEnders so that he could accept an offer to appear on a Sky series.

In May 2025 Dyer was the castaway for BBC Radio 4's Desert Island Discs.

== Personal life ==
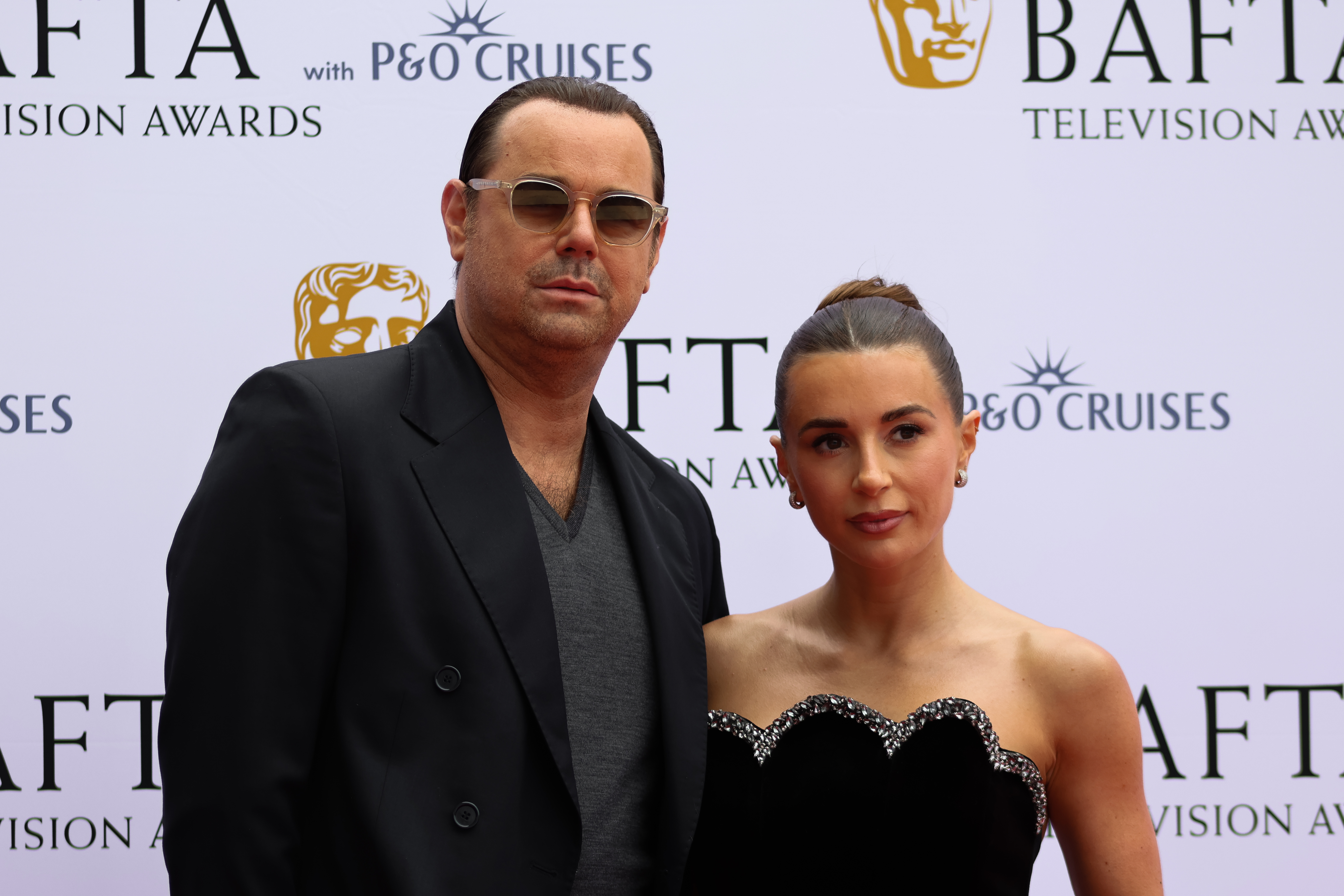
Dyer with his daughter Dani

Dyer resides in Debden, Essex. He began dating Joanne Mas in 1992 but they separated after the birth of their first daughter, future television personality Dani Dyer, in 1996. They began dating other people, but soon started an affair with each other and decided to reconcile. Dyer and Mas eventually married on 3 September 2016 at Chewton Glen in New Milton, Hampshire, after she proposed to him on 14 February 2015. They also have a second daughter and a son.

Dyer has been open about his drug use. In his autobiography, he stated, "I've always taken drugs and I probably always will, but there's a difference between having the odd crafty bump up the snout as a reward for a job well done and letting it rule your life." He has advocated for the legalisation of cocaine because he argues that banning it has not worked.

A lifelong football fan, Dyer supports West Ham United. In December 2007, he became the chairman of Kent League side Greenwich Borough after being appointed by club president, fellow actor Tamer Hassan. He said, "I just love football and the chance of being involved with a club is like a dream come true." The appointment was actually a publicity stunt to raise the profile of the club.

Dyer has been an outspoken critic of former Conservative Prime Minister David Cameron. In 2018, he referred to Cameron as a "twat" on live television, while also expressing contempt for Nigel Farage and Brexit. He voted for Brexit, but later changed his mind and considered himself to be a "poster boy" for the campaign to stop it. Dyer also expressed dislike towards Andy Burnham in 2026, opposing him because Burnham was not elected at a general election while also criticising the number of Prime Ministers the UK has had in recent years.

In 2011, Dyer released an autobiography titled Straight Up. In 2016, he released a second autobiography titled The World According to Danny Dyer: Life Lessons from the East End.

In 2016, Dyer travelled to Sierra Leone to take part in Sport Relief. He said, "I don't know what to expect when I go over there, but I'm hoping that it will make some kind of difference. It's an honour to be asked."

=== Zoo magazine controversy ===
In 2010, in his capacity as a celebrity agony uncle, Dyer wrote in Zoo that a young male reader could get over his recent breakup with a woman by "going on a rampage with the boys" or to "cut your ex's face, and then no one will want her". The comment was widely criticised by the media and the public, including the chief executive of the Fawcett Society, Ceri Goddard. Dyer later claimed that he was misquoted. Refuge CEO Sandra Horley also condemned the comment.

Zoo magazine issued a statement saying "Due to an extremely regrettable production error, an inappropriate and indefensible response to a letter has appeared in this week's issue. Zoo editor Tom Etherington apologises unreservedly for any offence the response may have caused and launched an internal inquiry to ensure lessons are learnt. Zoo and Danny Dyer condemn any violence against women."

== Filmography ==
Key
†	Denotes films that have not yet been released

=== Film ===
Year	Title	Role	Notes
1999	Human Traffic	Moff	
1999	The Trench	Lance Cpl. Victor Dell	
2000	Borstal Boy	Charlie Millwall	
2000	Greenfingers	Tony	
2001	Goodbye Charlie Bright	Francis	
2001	High Heels and Low Lifes	Danny	
2001	Mean Machine	Billy the Limpet	
2001	Tabloid	Joe Public	
2001	Is Harry on the Boat?	Brad	
2003	Wasp	Dave	Short film
2004	Free Speech	Mark	
2004	The Football Factory	Tommy Johnson	
2005	The Great Ecstasy of Robert Carmichael	Larry Haydn	
2005	The Business	Frankie	
2006	The Other Half	Mark Lamanuzzi	
2006	Severance	Steve	
2007	Outlaw	Gene Dekker	
2007	Straightheads	Adam	
2007	The All Together	Dennis Earle	
2008	Adulthood	Hayden	
2009	City Rats	Pete	
2009	Malice in Wonderland	Whitey	
2009	Doghouse	Neil	
2009	Jack Said	Nathan	
2009	Dead Man Running	Bing	
2009	Just for the Record	Derek La Farge	
2009	Pimp	Stanley	
2009	The Rapture	Wraith	
2009	Catwalk	Photographer	
2010	Basement	Gary	
2010	Devil's Playground	Joe	
2010	Dead Cert	Roger Kipling	Cameo
2010	The Last Seven	Angel of Death	
2011	Age of Heroes	Rains	
2011	Freerunner	Mr. Frank	
2011	7lives	Tom	
2012	Deviation	Frankie	
2013	Run For Your Wife	John Smith	
2013	Vendetta	Jimmy	
2014	Blood Shot	Phillip	Also known as In a Heartbeat
2014	The Hooligan Factory	Jeff	Cameo
2015	Assassin	James	
2025	Marching Powder	Jack	
2025	Christmas Karma	Cabbie	
2025	Tinsel Town	Kieran	
2026	One Last Deal	Jimmy Banks	
2027	Going Under †	Don	Post-production

=== Television ===
Year	Title	Role	Notes
1993	Prime Suspect	Martin Fletcher	Episode: "Prime Suspect 3"
1993	The Bill	Darrell Hughes	Episode: "Unlucky for Some"
1994	Cadfael	Bran	Episode: "The Leper of St. Giles"
1995	A Touch of Frost	Shaun Everett	Episode: "Dead Male One"
1995	Crown Prosecutor	Shane Cassidy	Season 1, episode 5
1995	Loved Up	Billy	Television film
1995	Children's Ward	Tony	Season 8, episode 3
1996	The Ruth Rendell Mysteries	Tom	Episode: "Heartstones, Part 2"
1996	Thief Takers	Alec	Episode: "The Outcasts"
1996	Screen Two	Bert	Episode: "Loving"
1996	The Bill	Gavin Parker	Episodes: "Home Truths" and "Merrily on High"
1996–1997	Bramwell	Danny	2 episodes
1997	Ain't Misbehavin'	Young Ronnie	3 episodes
1997	Highlander	Andrew Baines	Episode: "Avatar"
1997	Soldier Soldier	Gary Fox	Episodes: "Line of Departure" and "Sounds of War"
2002	Dead Casual	Wayne	Television film
2002	Foyle's War	Tony Lucciano	Episode: "A Lesson in Murder"
2003	Serious & Organised	Darren Evans	Episodes: "Greed" and "Unfaithful"
2003	Second Generation	Jack	Television film
2004	Family Business	Yankie	6 episodes
2005	Murder Investigation Team	Marc Sharaff	Episode: "Sexual Tension"
2005	Rose and Maloney	Danny	Episode: "Carl Callaghan"
2006	All in the Game	Martin	Television film
2006	The Real Football Factories	Himself	6 episodes
2007	The Real Football Factories International	Himself	10 episodes
2007	Hotel Babylon	Dave Osbourne	Season 2, episode 2
2007	Skins	Malcolm	Episodes: "Cassie" and "Michelle"
2008	Kiss of Death	Matt Costello	Television film
2011	Mongrels	Himself	Cameo
2012	Casualty	Rossy	Episode: "Love Is"
2013	Plebs	Cassius	Episode: "The Gladiator"
2013	Power to the People	Marc Cannon	Episodes: "Ops Populus" and "Keeping the Faith"
2013	Hollyoaks Later	The White Man	4 episodes
2013–2022	EastEnders	Mick Carter	Regular role; 1145 episodes
2018	True Love or True Lies	Himself / Presenter	
2018	All Round to Mrs. Brown's	Himself	Season 2, episode 1
2019	Danny Dyer's Right Royal Family	Himself	Main role
2019–2022	The Wall	Himself / Presenter	
2020	EastEnders: Secrets from the Square	Himself	Episode: "Mick and Linda"
2021	The Wheel	Himself / Participant	Christmas special
2023	Cheat	Himself / Host	
2023	Scared of The Dark	Himself / Host	
2023	Absolutely Dyer: Danny & Dani do Italy	Himself	Documentary series
2023	Heat	Steve Cameron	Main role
2023	Henpocalypse!	Himself	
2024	The Great Celebrity Bake Off for Stand Up To Cancer	Himself	Charity special
2024	Celebrity Gogglebox	Himself	Series 6 regular
2024	Danny Dyer: How To Be A Man	Himself	Documentary series
2024–present	Mr. Bigstuff	Lee	Main role
2024–present	Rivals	Freddie Jones	Main role
2025	CBeebies Bedtime Stories	Himself	Reed: Rhinos Don't Cry by Mark Grist
2026	The Dyers' Caravan Park	Himself	Reality series with Dani Dyer
2026	Nobody's Fool	Co-host	With co-host Emily Atack
2026	Saturday Night Live U.K.	Himself	S2 E4 Host; Cameo S2 E5
TBA	The Siege †	PC Trevor Lock	Main role

=== Video games ===
Year	Title	Role	Notes
2002	Grand Theft Auto: Vice City	Kent Paul	
2004	Grand Theft Auto: San Andreas	Kent Paul	
2021	Grand Theft Auto: The Trilogy – The Definitive Edition	Kent Paul	Archival recordings Remasters of Grand Theft Auto: Vice City and Grand Theft Auto: San Andreas only

=== Music videos ===
Year	Title	Artist
2016	"Nebraska"	Lucy Rose
2024	"Sail Away"	Lucy Rose

== Stage ==
- Certain Young Men (1999), by Peter Gill
- Celebration (2000), by Harold Pinter
- No Man's Land (2001–2002 revival), by Harold Pinter
- The Homecoming (2008 revival), by Harold Pinter
- Kurt and Sid (2009), by Roy Smiles

== Awards and nominations ==
Award	Year	Category	Work	Result	Ref.
British Academy Television Awards	2025	Best Male Comedy Performance	Mr. Bigstuff	Won	
British Horror Film Festival	2010	Best Actor	Devil's Playground	Won	
British Soap Awards	2014	Best Actor	EastEnders	Nominated	
British Soap Awards	2014	Sexiest Male	EastEnders	Nominated	
British Soap Awards	2014	Best On-Screen Partnership (with Kellie Bright)	EastEnders	Nominated	
British Soap Awards	2015	Best Actor	EastEnders	Nominated	
British Soap Awards	2016	Best Actor	EastEnders	Nominated	
British Soap Awards	2016	Best On-Screen Partnership (with Kellie Bright)	EastEnders	Nominated	
British Soap Awards	2019	Best Actor	EastEnders	Nominated	
Broadcasting Press Guild Awards	2025	Best Actor	Rivals	Won	
Inside Soap Awards	2014	Best Actor	EastEnders	Won	
Inside Soap Awards	2014	Sexiest Male	EastEnders	Nominated	
Inside Soap Awards	2015	Best Actor	EastEnders	Nominated	
Inside Soap Awards	2015	Sexiest Male	EastEnders	Nominated	
Inside Soap Awards	2016	Best Actor	EastEnders	Nominated	
Inside Soap Awards	2016	Funniest Male	EastEnders	Nominated	
Inside Soap Awards	2016	Sexiest Male	EastEnders	Nominated	
Inside Soap Awards	2017	Best Actor	EastEnders	Nominated	
Inside Soap Awards	2018	Best Actor	EastEnders	Nominated	
Inside Soap Awards	2018	Best Partnership (with Kellie Bright)	EastEnders	Won	
Inside Soap Awards	2019	Best Actor	EastEnders	Nominated	
Inside Soap Awards	2019	Funniest Male	EastEnders	Won	
Inside Soap Awards	2019	Best Partnership (with Kellie Bright)	EastEnders	Nominated	
Inside Soap Awards	2020	Best Partnership (with Kellie Bright)	EastEnders	Won	
Inside Soap Awards	2021	Best Actor	EastEnders	Nominated	
National Film Awards UK	2025	Outstanding Performance	Marching Powder	Won	
National Television Awards	2015	Serial Drama Performance	EastEnders	Won	
National Television Awards	2016	Serial Drama Performance	EastEnders	Won	
National Television Awards	2019	Serial Drama Performance	EastEnders	Won	
National Television Awards	2020	Serial Drama Performance	EastEnders	Nominated	
National Television Awards	2021	Serial Drama Performance	EastEnders	Nominated	
Royal Television Society Programme Awards	2025	Supporting Actor – Male	Rivals	Won	
TRIC Awards	2015	Soap Personality	EastEnders	Won	
TRIC Awards	2019	Soap Actor	EastEnders	Won	
TRIC Awards	2021	Soap Actor	EastEnders	Nominated	
TV Choice Awards	2014	Best Soap Actor	EastEnders	Won	
TV Choice Awards	2015	Best Soap Actor	EastEnders	Nominated	
TV Choice Awards	2016	Best Soap Actor	EastEnders	Nominated	
TV Choice Awards	2017	Best Soap Actor	EastEnders	Nominated	
TV Choice Awards	2018	Best Soap Actor	EastEnders	Won	
TV Choice Awards	2019	Best Soap Actor	EastEnders	Won	
TV Choice Awards	2020	Best Soap Actor	EastEnders	Nominated	
TV Choice Awards	2021	Best Soap Actor	EastEnders	Nominated	
TV Choice Awards	2022	Best Soap Actor	EastEnders	Nominated	
TV Choice Awards	2026	Best Comedy Performance	Mr. Bigstuff	Nominated	
TVTimes Awards	2014	Favourite Soap Star	EastEnders	2nd place	
TVTimes Awards	2018	Favourite Soap Star	EastEnders	Won	
TVTimes Awards	2025	Favourite Actor	Mr. Bigstuff	Nominated	
