= The Business (film) =

- Film poster
- Directed by: Nick Love
- Written by: Nick Love
- Produced by: Allan Niblo; James Richardson
- Starring: Danny Dyer; Tamer Hassan; Geoff Bell; Georgina Chapman
- Cinematography: Damian Bromley
- Edited by: Stuart Gazzard
- Music by: Ivor Guest
- Production companies: Vertigo Films; Monkey Productions S.L. Powder Films
- Distributed by: Pathe Distribution
- Release date: 2 September 2005
- Running time: 97 minutes
- Countries: United Kingdom; Spain
- Languages: English; Spanish

The Business is a 2005 crime film written and directed by Nick Love. The film stars Danny Dyer, Tamer Hassan and Roland Manookian, all of whom were in Love's previous film The Football Factory. Geoff Bell and Georgina Chapman also appear. The plot of The Business follows the Greek tragedy-like rise and fall of a young cockney's career within a drug importing business run by a group of British expatriate fugitive criminals living on the Costa del Sol in Spain.

== Plot ==
The film is narrated by Frankie, a young everyman living in South East London during the Thatcher era of the 1980s specifically 1984, with little hope of ever making anything of himself, yet he dreams of "being somebody" and escaping his lonely, dreary lifestyle. After severely beating his mother's abusive boyfriend, he becomes a fugitive, and through family connections escapes to the Costa del Sol. His job there is to deliver a bag containing money to "Playboy Charlie", a suave expat and fugitive who runs his own nightclub. Impressed by Frankie's honesty in not opening the bag, Charlie takes a liking to Frankie, introduces him to his business associates, including the psychopathic Sammy, and invites him to remain in Spain and work as his driver. Frankie discovers that Charlie and his associates are in fact the "Peckham Four", wanted for armed robbery back in Britain. However, Frankie decides he prefers the excitement, wealth, status, and luxury that Charlie's gang offers, as opposed to his previous unremarkable life in London. Frankie therefore joins Charlie in the business of smuggling hashish across the Strait of Gibraltar from Morocco.

The film then follows the rise-and-fall pattern common to many gangster films, showing first the criminals living the high life as their cannabis trade is booming, and then their downfall as greed and paranoia introduce conflict between them, and eventually split them up. Tensions amid the group are exacerbated by the mutual attraction between Frankie and Sammy's wife Carly. Charlie and Frankie decide to go into business alone, importing cocaine instead of cannabis through drop-offs from Colombian aeroplanes, but this fails to resolve their problems. Not only do both men become increasingly addicted to the drug itself, but their new smuggling attracts the ire of the local mayor, who had previously been happy to ignore the cannabis trade but warned them not to import cocaine. After discovering that Frankie and Charlie have entered the cocaine trade, the mayor cracks down on their gang and shuts down their businesses. A subsequent assassination attempt on the mayor's life proves unsuccessful, and leads to the beheading of one of the gang's affiliates.

Six months later, Frankie and Charlie are homeless thugs, reduced to stealing in order to survive. While organising a disappointing reunion party at Charlie's old bar, now run by Frankie's friend Sonny, Frankie meets Carly again and decides to make one last deal. He invites Sammy in on a pick-up, but while both intend to betray the other, Carly had given Sammy a pistol. Sammy tries to shoot Frankie, but this proves unsuccessful as his pistol was handed to him with an empty magazine, unbeknownst to Sammy. Frankie in turn attacks Sammy with a rock; the fight then ends abruptly as Sammy is fatally shot by Spanish Navy patrolmen while Frankie escapes through a sewage pipe and emerges to meet Carly, who was responsible for handing Sammy his unloaded gun. Preparing to leave town with Carly, Frankie discovers that she is plotting against him as well when he finds another pistol in her handbag amongst their money; Frankie knocks her unconscious and drives off triumphantly into the sunset on his own.

The ending reveals that Sonny cleaned up his act and continued to run Charlie's old bar, which he did successfully, whilst Charlie was reduced to working as a bouncer. The theatrical ending also reveals that "Carly went back to her parents' house in Penge", "Sammy went to Hell" and "Frankie went to Hollywood".

== Cast ==
- Danny Dyer as Frankie
- Tamer Hassan as Charlie
- Geoff Bell as Sammy
- Georgina Chapman as Carly
- Linda Henry as Shirley
- Roland Manookian as Sonny
- Camille Coduri as Nora
- Andy Parfitt as Andy
- Michael Maxwell as Jimmy
- Arturo Venegas as The Mayor
- Eddie Webber as Ronnie
- Adam Bolton as Danny
- Martin Marquez as Pepe, the mayor's aide
- Sally Watkins as Mum
- Alex Goodger as Dead Moroccan Child

== Soundtrack ==
The original music for the film was written by Ivor Guest, but most of the soundtrack consists of popular 1980s chart hits, which give the film much of its atmosphere and flavour. The soundtrack shares some of the tracks (Nick Love's 2004 film, The Football Factory). The songs featured include:

1. Duran Duran – "Planet Earth"
2. Frankie Goes to Hollywood – "Welcome to the Pleasuredome"
3. Mary Jane Girls – "All Night Long"
4. The Cult – "Wild Flower"
5. Loose Ends – "Hangin' on a String (Contemplating)"
6. Rick James – "Ghetto Life"
7. Blondie - "Heart of Glass"
8. Simple Minds – "Don't You (Forget About Me)"
9. Martha and the Muffins – "Echo Beach"
10. The Buggles – "Video Killed the Radio Star"
11. A Flock of Seagulls – "I Ran (So Far Away)"
12. Belouis Some – "Imagination"
13. Shannon – "Let the Music Play"
14. David Bowie – "Modern Love"
15. Talk Talk – "It's My Life"
16. The Knack – "My Sharona"
17. Roxy Music – "Avalon"
18. Simple Minds - "Themes For Great Cities"
19. Orchestral Manoeuvres in the Dark – "Maid of Orleans"
20. Adam and the Ants – "Kings of the Wild Frontier"
21. Blondie – "Call Me"
22. Kim Carnes – "Bette Davis Eyes"

== Critical reception ==
The Business was nominated for "Best Achievement in Production" at the 2005 British Independent Film Award, although it lost to Gypo.

Upon release, The Business received largely positive reviews from lads' mags, which shared a target demographic with the film. Front Magazine said the film has "more guns than Goodfellas, more coke than Casino and more swearing than Scarface"; Nuts magazine said that the film is "the coolest British film since Layer Cake". Zoo magazine said "this film will actually make you think that the '80s were cool. Another top job by the director of The Football Factory"; What's on TV said "A rush of '80s mood, fashion and music and nailbiting climax are the icing on a brilliant crime cake". In other outlets, critical reception to the film was mixed to negative. The Business currently has a 57% critics approval rating on aggregate ratings site Rotten Tomatoes based on seven reviews.
