= Human Traffic =

1999 British comedy film by Justin Kerrigan

- US release poster
- Directed by: Justin Kerrigan
- Written by: Justin Kerrigan
- Produced by: Allan Niblo; Emer McCourt; Renata S. Aly
- Starring: John Simm; Lorraine Pilkington; Shaun Parkes; Danny Dyer; Nicola Reynolds
- Cinematography: Dave Bennett
- Edited by: Patrick Moore
- Music by: Matthew Herbert; Roberto Mello
- Production companies: Irish Screen; Fruit Salad Films
- Distributed by: Metrodome Distribution (United Kingdom); Clarence Pictures (Ireland)
- Release dates: 4 June 1999 (United Kingdom); 18 June 1999 (Ireland)
- Running time: 99 minutes
- Countries: United Kingdom; Ireland
- Language: English
- Budget: £2.2 million
- Box office: £2.5 million

Human Traffic is a 1999 British independent coming of age comedy-drama film written and directed by Justin Kerrigan. A cult film of the Cool Cymru era of arts in Wales, it stars John Simm, Lorraine Pilkington, Shaun Parkes, Danny Dyer, and Nicola Reynolds.

Exploring themes of coming of age, drug and nightclub cultures, as well as relationships, Human Traffic includes scenes provoking social commentary and the use of archive footage to provide political commentary. The plot revolves around five twenty-something friends and their wider work and social circle, the latter devotees of the club scene, taking place over the course of a drug-fuelled weekend in Cardiff, Wales. A central feature is the avoidance of moralising about the impact of 1990s dance lifestyle; instead the film concentrates on recreating the "vibe, the venues and the mood" of the dance movement from the 1988–89 "Second Summer of Love" to the film's release in 1999. In the first 25 minutes, Lee, the 17-year-old brother of central character Nina, enthuses "I am about to be part of the chemical generation" and lists, using the slang of the period, a series of drugs that he might use later that night. The film is narrated by Simm, features numerous cameo appearances, is Dyer's film debut, and references another drug culture film of the era, Trainspotting.

With an original budget of £340,000, the production eventually came in for £2.2 million; the film was a financial success, grossing £2.5 million in the UK alone, also enjoying good VHS and DVD sales. Human Traffic has achieved cult status, especially amongst subcultures such as the rave culture. The first public showing of the film took place at Homelands 1999.

A sequel, entitled Revolution, was announced in April 2019, with Dyer, Parkes, and Reynolds due to reprise their roles. However, Kerrigan confirmed in 2024 that he will never make the sequel.

== Synopsis ==
The film is an ensemble piece in which the five protagonists plan, enjoy and come down from a weekend out in Cardiff; all motivated at least in part by the need for a weekend escape from the banality and misery of their daily lives. Jip is suffering from sexual anxiety brought on by a series of unsuccessful liaisons. Koop, Jip's best friend, is jealous of his girlfriend Nina's happy and care-free nature. Nina is being sexually harassed in a job she had no choice but to take after having failed a college interview. Lulu, Jip's best female friend and "dropping partner", has suffered infidelity in her last three relationships. Moff, the newest member of the group having met Jip at a warehouse party after moving from London to Cardiff, is an unemployed slacker who works as a small-time dealer, despite his father being a senior policeman. The five friends become very close, take drugs such as cannabis, ecstasy and cocaine, and "live for the weekend".

The film follows the antics of the five friends as well as various characters they meet along the way. They go to pubs and clubs on Friday, taking along Nina's 17-year-old brother Lee whose waning enthusiasm for his first drugs experience is played out in a debate between Jip and a doctor. Jip gives up his ticket to Lulu, whom he has talked into coming out and is forced to talk his way into the club as the group are a ticket short. The club scene is then examined through a series of cameos including two attempts by older journalists to understand the club scene. The ensemble then joins a house party, where Lulu and Jip finally kiss and attempt unsuccessfully to make love; whereas the established couple, Koop and Nina, fight over Koop's perceptions about her behaviour. Later, as expected by the group, "what goes up must come down" sets in as the effects of their drug use begin to hit home leaving them coping with feelings of anxiety and paranoia. They recover Lee from a group of younger partygoers he has spent the night with and make their way home.

On returning home, some of the group's issues are mended whilst some are thrown into sharper relief. Jip makes love with Lulu, overcoming his sexual problems. Koop and Nina's argument is resolved. Lee has made it through the weekend without any of his concerns being realised. Moff, however, is still caught up in the paranoia caused by his extensive drug use. He argues with his parents again and is seen walking alone around Cardiff feeling depressed. However, Moff joins his friends for an end of the weekend drink and having raged about his obsession with drugs is soon joking about his addiction with his friends. The film finishes with Jip and Lulu kissing in the street.

== Cast ==
- John Simm as Jip
- Lorraine Pilkington as Lulu
- Shaun Parkes as Koop
- Danny Dyer as Moff
- Nicola Reynolds as Nina
- Andrew Lincoln as Felix
- Dean Davies as Lee
- Richard Coyle as Andy

Cameo appearances

- When Jip first picks up Koop in his car, the DJ heard on the radio is Pete Tong, the film's musical adviser, who has a weekly Friday night radio show on BBC Radio 1.
- "Pablo Hassan", manager of the Asylum club, is played by prominent DJ Carl Cox.
- Director Kerrigan appears in several scenes as "Ziggy Marlon", the Junglist dancer in Koop's record shop who asks, "Any jungle in, guy?", as an early aficionado of 'TomToms', the precursor to the Asylum club, (the main club venue for the film), and in a later scene driving with Nina's brother on their way to the house party, as well as several other brief appearances throughout the film. A deleted scene from the film also shows his character in a state of drug induced hysteria while he laughs for no apparent reason.
- Stand-up comedian Jo Brand narrates the scene when Moff (Danny Dyer) is on the sofa hallucinating and losing touch with reality. She was previously a psychiatric nurse.
- Howard Marks appears and narrates the scene on "spliff politics". Marks was a famous cannabis smuggler turned "motivational speaker" and author who wrote his autobiography, Mr Nice, about his criminal life.
- Bill Hicks is described as a "visionary" by characters in the film and features in one scene through archive footage.
- Mad Doctor X appears in the background during the Record Shop Scene.
- Nicola Heywood-Thomas appears as a TV reporter making a documentary on club culture. After conducting a brief interview, she mutters "fucking pisstakers" under her breath.

== Production ==
=== Concept ===
25 years old at the time, Welsh filmmaker Justin Kerrigan wrote the film along with producer Allan Niblo, Kerrigan's teacher and "mentor" at Newport Film School. Kerrigan wanted the film to be as realistic as possible in depicting young people's lives in contemporary Britain, as well as realistically portraying drug culture and club culture, both walks of life in which Kerrigan had experience. Kerrigan based much of the film on his own exploits, and eventually took over in a director capacity. In an edition of UK gay lifestyle magazine Attitude, actor Danny Dyer spoke about the film being partly inspired by the 1995 BBC television drama Loved Up, and which had similar themes to the film.

=== Locations ===
Much of the film was shot in Cardiff, where the film also takes place. Nina's workplace, a fictionalised McDonald's, was filmed at UCI 12 Cinemas (Now an Odeon Cinema), Atlantic Wharf Leisure Village, Hemingway Road. The public house during the Friday night scene was shot at the Firedrake & Firkin Pub, 39–41 Salisbury Road, Cathays, Cardiff. The Emporium nightclub on Cardiff High Street was used as the exterior of the fictional "Asylum" club, and the former club X, Charles Street stood in as the interior. The Philharmonic public house on St Mary's Street is where the Sunday pub scene was filmed, and Jip and Lulu's Sunday night walk home was also filmed in St Mary's Street.

== Themes ==
=== Alienation ===
Inter-generation alienation is a significant theme of the film including being directly referenced in a pub scene in which the main, minor and bit players sing a revised version of the national anthem of the United Kingdom 38 minutes into the film. Many of the characters have family troubles which cause conflict with family members. Jip's mother is a sex worker; Koop's father lives in a fantasy world under residential psychiatric care since his wife left him. Moff still lives at home and is shown as being in continual tension with his father and embarrassed when he is caught masturbating by his mother. The family relationships of the female leads are explored in less detail, although one scene portrays Lulu giving only limited details of her weekend to an uncle and aunt who are dressed as clergy. At least one contemporary review suggests that these relationships are not adequately explored in the film.

=== Work and unemployment ===
The film is also indifferent to the work ethic. Jip works at a clothing retail outlet and is comedically represented as a 'wage slave'; particularly in a scene where he is shown being anally raped by his boss, who has a barcode on his forehead and forcibly covers Jip's mouth with a £20 note. Nina has similar misgivings about her job at a fast-food restaurant where all the employees are shown bodypopping robotically and she quits her work following sexual harassment. Moff argues with his father about preferring to be unemployed whilst Lulu is shown not enjoying her college experience.

=== Drugs and the counter culture ===
All the characters identify strongly with the 1990s counter-culture: all are drug users to a greater or lesser extent; Jip idolises Bill Hicks; Koop dreams of being a DJ; Moff's bedroom is festooned with anti-establishment posters. Lulu gives an extended speech about her individuality whilst Nina revels in becoming unemployed.

Jip concludes his narration by saying "We're all fucked up in our own way, y'know, but we're all doing it together. We're freestylin' on the buckle wheel of life, trapped in a world of internal dialogue. Like Bill Hicks said: 'It's an insane world, but I'm proud to be part of it.'"

Although there is significant dialogue about drug use contained in the film (specifically MDMA (ecstasy), marijuana, and one sarcastic discussion about heroin and crack cocaine), the only drug use by main characters is a scene where Jip and Koop are having an intimate conversation at a house party and they are seen cutting up a line of white powder. They are never actually shown snorting it, but nonchalantly rub it into their gums during a discussion. Later at the same party Nina and Lulu are seen sharing a spliff on a balcony and Ernie, one of the protagonist's in Howard Marks' monologue 'Spliff Politics' is also seen smoking a large spliff.

== Reception ==
The film received mixed reviews. On the review aggregator website Rotten Tomatoes, 59% of 32 critics' reviews are positive, with an average rating of 6.3/10. Metacritic, which uses a weighted average, assigned the film a score of 53 out of 100, based on 24 critics, indicating "mixed or average" reviews. Film critic Colm Keaveny proclaimed this film to be Danny Dyer's "finest hour", and Irish critic James Murphy called Dyer's performance "truly remarkable". The film garnered 11 international awards and was nominated for a BAFTA. Leonard Maltin gave the film two and a half stars, describing it as "a writer's film if there ever was one".

== Soundtrack ==
An important part of this film is the soundtrack, which includes some of the most famous contemporary dance music producers of the time. These include Armand Van Helden, C. J. Bolland, Fatboy Slim, Jacknife Lee, Pete Heller, Ferry Corsten, Carl Cox, Dillinja, Felix Da Housecat, Orbital, Aphrodite, Death in Vegas, Primal Scream, Liquid Child, Underworld, Age of Love, Energy 52, Brainbug and Lucid. The incidental music and scratching from the scene 'Puffin' the Herb' was by Mad Doctor X.

== American version ==
The version of the film released in the United States was heavily edited to remove certain British cultural references and terminology that it was presumably felt American audiences would be unable to identify with or understand. These are mostly in the form of re-dubbed dialogue, such as Jip saying that he and Lulu "recently became dropping partners" being changed to "clubbing partners"; Nina's speech to the journalists in which she says she is looking forward to getting into some "hardcore Richard and Judy" becoming "hardcore Jerry Springer"; and Jip's allusion to Only Fools and Horses with "he who dares, Rodders," being rendered as "he Who Dares Wins".

Other material was simply cut, including Lulu dumping her boyfriend; most of Koop's conversation with his father in the psychiatric hospital; and the 1991 "Summer of Love" flashback sequence. As a result of various cuts, the US version runs to 84m 14s, compared to the original 99m 21s, losing just over 15 minutes of footage, in addition to the numerous re-dubs. Certain scenes also feature different music from the original UK version.

== Human Traffic Remixed ==
On 21 October 2002, distributors VCI announced the DVD release of Human Traffic Remixed, promising a "modernised" soundtrack with new contemporary (2002) tracks, previously cut scenes, and "state-of-the-art CGI effects." On 18 October The Guardian revealed that rather than being a "director's cut", it was the work of producer Allan Niblo, Kerrigan's tutor and "mentor" at film school. Niblo removed from the titles all shots of the 1994 anti-Criminal Justice and Public Order Act demonstration and subsequent riot, thus eliminating the implicit political element of the original. He also cut the more anti-royalist second verse of the spoof national anthem, and all references to Moff, played by Dyer, being a casual drug dealer. Dyer went on to star in other Niblo produced films, notably The Football Factory. He added previously deleted scenes about Jip's internal struggles over his mother being a sex worker, and another where the female leads play aliens, creating a film slightly less concerned with the politics and active promulgation of the Class-A Ecstasy & MDMA drug culture endemic in the 1990s, and more about coming of age struggles informed by a passive participation in it.

Kerrigan only learnt about the project two weeks before the release was due. He explained: "I joke about it. How I signed over the copyright (to Niblo) for a pound and then never even saw the pound. When I finished I was £25,000 in debt. I've never made a penny from the film. Legally I don't have a leg to stand on, but I signed the contract because I was very naive and very broke. Now I'm just broke." No longer able to afford living in London, where he had moved after the film's release, Kerrigan was preparing to return to his native Cardiff. Although shot on a budget of £340,000 and UK box office taking of £2.5 million, Niblo maintained that the film had not made a profit, stating: "the investment is still unrecouped." John Simm was highly critical of the new release, describing it as "cynical exploitation" and complained of Niblo's attempts to get him to appear in a sequel when he had only been paid a nominal fee for the first film. Simm said that he only appeared in Human Traffic because of Kerrigan's involvement. While the original 99m 21s cinema version runs to 95m 21s on video due to PAL speed-up, the Remixed version runs to 95m 30s

== See also ==
- Loved Up (1995 film), a BBC TV drama exploring clubbing and drug culture
- Go, a US film about rave culture released the same year
- Groove, a US film about rave culture released a year later
- Sorted, a UK film about trance culture released a year later
- South West 9, a UK drugs comedy
