= Faintheart =

- Theatrical release poster
- Directed by: Vito Rocco
- Written by: David Lemon
- Produced by: Peter Carlton; Nick Love; Rob Morgan; Lee Thomas
- Starring: Eddie Marsan; Ewen Bremner; Jessica Hynes; Tim Healy; Paul Nicholls; Bronagh Gallagher; Phil Lester
- Cinematography: David Katznelson
- Edited by: Neil Smith
- Music by: Mike Batt
- Production company: Vertigo Films
- Distributed by: Vertigo Films
- Release dates: June 2008 (Edinburgh); 27 January 2009
- Running time: 92 minutes
- Country: United Kingdom
- Language: English

Faintheart is a 2008 British comedy film directed by Vito Rocco and starring Eddie Marsan, Ewen Bremner and Jessica Hynes. The film's creation was influenced by collaborative input from the MySpace community.

== Plot ==
Richard is obsessed with medieval war re-enactment. After he turns up late to his father-in-law's funeral, still wearing Viking costume, his wife Cath kicks him out. Richard's honour is further damaged when Cath starts dating his son's PE teacher, Gary. Richard is desperate to win her back, and attempts to re-enact the circumstances in which the two fell in love.

Richard's best friend Julian, who owns a comic book store, is also having romantic problems. Meanwhile, Richard's nerdy son Martin is bullied at school and resents Richard for his embarrassing hobby.

Richard's viking troupe performs a display in front of Martin's class. Richard picks Martin out to fight, but Martin hits him with a quarterstaff and runs away. Wounded by this rejection, Richard realises he must change.

After a heart-to-heart with his Viking friends, Richard cuts off his long hair and apologises at his father-in-law's grave. However, when Martin's young girlfriend expresses an interest in watching medieval re-enactment, Richard rescues his swords from the dump. Meanwhile, Cath realises that Gary looks good but is ugly inside. Julian, who was previously catfished by a small child, finds love with the child's mother Maggie, who loves Star Trek: The Next Generation just as much as he does.

Richard joins a huge public display battle between Vikings and Normans. The fight is interrupted by Gary arriving, which results in a duel between Richard and Gary. Martin attempts to intervene, but Cath takes a bow and arrow and forces Gary to retreat. The crowd cheers for Cath and Martin.

== Cast ==
- Eddie Marsan as Richard
- Ewen Bremner as Julian
- Jessica Hynes as Cath
- Bronagh Gallagher as Maggie
- Tim Healy as Geoff
- Paul Nicholls as Gary
- Anne Reid as Barbara Wallace, Richard's mother-in-law
- Joseph Hamilton as Martin
- Chloe Hesar as Emily, Martin's crush
- Richard Ridings as Collin
- Gary Sefton as Vince
- Kevin Eldon as Alan
- Sandra Voe as Julian's mother
- Matthew Leighton as Kim
- Tom Smith as Danny
- Phil Lester as Tim
- Oscar McDevitt as Pete

== Production ==
The film was written by David Lemon and directed by Vito Rocco. Rocco said:

[Screenwriter David Lemon] misspent his youth in Southend observing battle re-enactors, I misspent my youth observing am-dram actors in Norfolk; and the Viking heritage combined to make the idea.

Faintheart billed itself as "the world's first user-generated movie". Vertigo Films, Myspace and Film4 collaborated to form the Myspace Movie Mash Up competition, which offered a £1m budget to aspiring directors. From a shortlist selected by experts, Myspace users chose Vito Rocco as the winning director.

Myspace users also auditioned for character roles. More than 1,400 users auditioned, with Rocco choosing 11 non-professional actors to feature in the film. Some crew members were also sourced from Myspace. Users sent in jokes and chose the songs and bands to form the soundtrack.

Professional Viking re-enactors from UK-based company "The Vikings" formed part of the cast alongside Britannia Romano-British society. A specialist stunt team from East 15 Acting School took part in filming the large battles under the fight direction of Richard Ryan.

== Reception ==
The Guardian gave the film two out of five stars, writing, "this is not a bad movie, exactly, but it aims curiously low, and is faintly pointless; and while the actors cope well with the material, they are finally just cardboard characters in a balsa-wood plot." Sky Movies gave the film four out of five stars, saying, "it's a totally unexpected hoot...Director Vito Rocco and credited writer David Lemon have done a terrific job in creating one of the most consistently funny and winning Brit-coms of recent years." The IGN review by Chris Tilly was positive.
