= The Sweeney (2012 film) =

2012 British film by Nick Love

- UK theatrical release poster
- Directed by: Nick Love
- Screenplay by: Nick Love
- Story by: Nick Love; John Hodge
- Based on: The Sweeney by Ian Kennedy Martin
- Produced by: Allan Niblo; Rupert Preston; James Richardson; Christopher Simon; Felix Vossen
- Starring: Ray Winstone; Ben Drew; Hayley Atwell; Steven Mackintosh; Paul Anderson; Alan Ford; Damian Lewis
- Cinematography: Simon Dennis
- Edited by: James Herbert
- Music by: Lorne Balfe
- Production company: Vertigo Films
- Distributed by: Entertainment One
- Release date: 12 September 2012
- Running time: 112 minutes
- Country: United Kingdom
- Languages: English; Serbian
- Budget: £3 million
- Box office: $7.7 million

The Sweeney is a 2012 British action drama film, inspired by the 1970s British television police drama The Sweeney, but set in contemporary London. Written and directed by Nick Love, from a story by Love and John Hodge, it is based on the characters created by Ian Kennedy Martin. It stars Ray Winstone as Jack Regan, Plan B (credited as Ben Drew) as George Carter, and Damian Lewis as Frank Haskins, with Allen Leech and Hayley Atwell.

The story focuses on two members of the Flying Squad, a branch of the Metropolitan Police. The Squad's purpose is to investigate commercial armed robberies, along with the prevention and investigation of other serious armed crime. The title is derived from Sweeney Todd, which is Cockney rhyming slang for "Flying Squad". The film was released on 12 September 2012.

== Plot ==
Flying Squad officers DI Jack Regan (Ray Winstone) and DC George Carter (Ben Drew) arrive at the scene of a warehouse robbery; four armed men are attempting to steal gold bars. After they capture the robbers, Regan takes some of the gold bars to give to his informant Harry (Alan Ford). DCI Ivan Lewis (Steven Mackintosh) from the Met's Professional Standards Department begins scrutinising Regan's activities, unaware of Regan's affair with Lewis's estranged wife, fellow Flying Squad officer Nancy Lewis (Hayley Atwell).

Regan receives information about a planned robbery on a private bank, but ceases surveillance when an armed robbery at an insignificant jewellers places £200,000 of jewellery in the hands of a dangerous criminal, and leaves one civilian dead. Regan suspects long-time adversary Francis Allen (Paul Anderson) is responsible, but cannot disprove Allen was out of the country. After evidence links violent Serbian criminal Makin Trebolt (Kevin Michaels) to the crime, Regan grudgingly releases Allen.

When the private bank is robbed, the Flying Squad arrives in time to confront the heavily armed robbers, defying their boss, DCI Frank Haskins (Damian Lewis). After a long chase and shootout the robbers escape, with Makin deliberately shooting Nancy dead in front of an incapacitated Regan. A grieving DCI Lewis uses the shootout as justification to suspend the entire Flying Squad. Determined, Regan obtains a fake badge and illegal weapon, and interrogates a local thug, who unexpectedly confesses that Allen paid him to fake his alibi. Before he can share this information with Carter, Regan is arrested and jailed.

Working separately, Carter tracks down and interrogates a robber wounded in the shootout, who reveals Makin plans to escape via a boat named Pegasus. Shortly after, the armed Carter is arrested at gunpoint, only for Haskins to intervene, hoping to save Carter's career. Despite this, Haskins is unwilling to listen to Carter until Carter spots the name "Pegasus" in the Flying Squad's notes; it is the name of Allen's boat.

Finally connecting Allen and the crimes, Haskins arranges for Regan's release. Regan and Carter head to the docks to intercept Makin and Allen, who manage to escape via car; they eventually pursue the pair to a caravan park where both vehicles crash. Carter exits the vehicle and tries to fire on the pair as they attempt to flee, only to be struck by their vehicle. Makin points his weapon at the wounded Carter, but Regan fatally shoots Makin and then points the gun point blank at a heavily injured Allen, saying "you're nicked," before lowering it.

Some time later, Regan returns to the now reactivated Flying Squad offices, reinstated. He and the rest of the squad leave on a case, with DCI Lewis watching DI Carter and DC Regan as they go.

== Cast ==
- Ray Winstone as Detective Inspector Jack Regan
- Plan B as Detective Constable George Carter
- Hayley Atwell as Detective Constable Nancy Lewis
- Steven Mackintosh as Detective Chief Inspector Ivan Lewis
- Paul Anderson as Francis Allen
- Alan Ford as Harry
- Damian Lewis as Detective Chief Inspector Frank Haskins
- Allen Leech as Detective Constable Simon Ellis
- Steven Waddington as Detective Constable Nathan Miller
- Caroline Chikezie as Detective Constable Kara Clarke
- Kara Tointon as Megan Barret
- Nick Nevern as Freddie
- Ed Skrein as David
- Allan Corduner as a doctor

== Production ==
=== Development ===
A film version of the television series was first announced in 2008. The film was to be produced by DNA Films, and to be written and directed by Nick Love. Love was asked to write the film alongside Ian Kennedy Martin, the creator of the original series. Filming was originally planned for Spring 2009, with Ray Winstone's name confirmed for the role of Jack Regan, and Ewan McGregor and Daniel Craig being suggested as possibilities for the lead role of George Carter. Orlando Bloom and Tom Hardy were other names linked to the remake. At the time, it was not revealed whether the film would be set in the 1970s, or remade for the present day. Sponsor Fox Searchlight withdrew support just a few weeks before filming was due to start, and the project soon looked to be on hold, until July 2010, when the budget on the project was announced to be £3 million.

=== Casting ===
In April 2011, the participation of Winstone was confirmed, for the role of Jack Regan. One of Winstone's earliest roles had been in the TV series of the same name as an unnamed youth. Ben Drew, alias rapper Plan B, took the role of George Carter. It was confirmed by the film's director, Nick Love, that the budget was around £3 million. The film was completed in mid-2012, and released on 12 September 2012. The final amount spent on the production was actually less than £2 million, coming in more than £1 million under budget.

=== Top Gear ===
BBC's Top Gear filmed a car chase for the production in Series 18, Episode 3. The car chase scenes filmed with Top Gear were filmed on the Isle of Sheppey, Kent in Queenborough and Sheerness and the presenters and production team from Top Gear assisted with planning and filming. Jeremy Clarkson, Richard Hammond and James May were reported to have driven but their names do not appear in the film credits. In the episode only Richard Hammond and Jeremy Clarkson are shown.

== Release ==
=== Box office ===
On the weekend of release, The Sweeney topped the UK box office, taking over £1.5 million and replacing Dredd at the top of the chart.

=== Critical reception ===
The film received mixed reviews from critics. On Rotten Tomatoes, the film has a score of 46% based on 65 reviews, with an average rating of 5.1/10. The site's consensus states: "Ray Winstone exudes tough-guy bravado, but this cop thriller otherwise feels thoroughly generic." On Metacritic, the film holds a weighted average score of 48 out of 100 based on 11 critics, indicating "mixed or average reviews".

The New York Times wrote, "Marred by an overbearing musical score and an undercooked plot (by the director, Nick Love, and John Hodge), “The Sweeney” nevertheless looks a lot classier than its characters. Simon Dennis's photography is glossy and crisp, and a lengthy foot chase — making excellent use of the National Gallery — is inventively choreographed."

Metacritic reports a 48 out of 100 rating based on 11 critics, indicating "mixed or average reviews".
