= Danny Dyer's Right Royal Family =

Historical television documentary

Danny Dyer's Right Royal Family is a two-part BBC One historical television documentary hosted by actor Danny Dyer, who explores the lives of his aristocratic ancestors and how they lived. The series aired in January 2019.

Dyer, who discovered he was descended from King Edward III of England in his 2016 appearance on Who Do You Think You Are?, takes a look at the lives of his famous ancestors, including Edward, Rollo and William the Conqueror. He travelled to Sweden and France as part of the documentary.
