= Allan Niblo =

British film producer

- Born: United Kingdom
- Occupation(s): Film producer, film director

Allan Niblo is a British film producer and director.

He co-founded Vertigo Films in 2002.

== Filmography ==
=== Producer ===
- Human Traffic (1999)
- South West 9 (2001)
- The Football Factory (2004)
- It's All Gone Pete Tong (2004)
- The Business (2005)
- WΔZ (2007)
- Outlaw (2007)
- Monsters (2010)
- Monsters: Dark Continent (2014)
- Book of Love (2022)

=== Executive producer ===
- Dirty Sanchez: The Movie (2006)
- The Wake Wood (2011)
- Horrid Henry: The Movie (2011)
- The Facility (2012)

== Awards ==
- BAFTA – Cymru Award

== Nominations ==
- Genie Award – Best Motion Picture for It's All Gone Pete Tong
- Leo Award – Feature Length Drama: Best Feature Length Drama for It's All Gone Pete Tong
