= Nick Love =

English film director (b. 1969)

- Love at the 2026 BFI London Film Festival
- Born: Nick Love; 24 December 1969 (age 56); London, England
- Occupations: Film director; writer
- Years active: 1995–present
- Spouse: Patsy Palmer (m. 1998; div. 2000)

Nick Love (born 24 December 1969) is an English film director and writer. His credits include the films Goodbye Charlie Bright (2001), The Football Factory (2004), The Business (2005), Outlaw (2007), The Sweeney (2012), a 2009 remake of football hooliganism drama The Firm and the comedy-drama Marching Powder (2025).

His parents divorced when he was five years of age, and he was brought up on a large council estate in south London.

== Career ==
Before film school, Love had a successful modelling career in 1990 whilst in Miami. He then decided to leave modelling behind in order to go to film school.

Love attended the Bournemouth Film School at the age of 24.

In 2001, Nick Love made Goodbye Charlie Bright, focusing on working class life on council estates.

Love wrote and directed The Football Factory in 2004. The film was based on a book by John King.

In 2005, Love directed the film The Business, which reflects the 1980s Costa Del Crime era. It was all taken from what he had read and heard from others about that particular time. In 2007, Love produced the vigilante movie Outlaw.

In 2009, Love directed The Firm. The film focused on male friendship, football hooliganism and the football casual movement.

On 1 August 2012, Love's film The Sweeney made its world premiere at the opening of the Locarno International Film Festival in Switzerland. The film is based on the British television police drama of the same name. Love said that he had interest in making the movie for several years, but had difficult negotiations with studio executives, who wanted him to make the film with an Americanised style.

Speaking at the UK premiere of The Sweeney in London, Alan Ford, who played Harry, explained that Nick Love "works very fast" and "does not mess about" as a director.

In 2015, Love directed American Hero, an American-British superhero comedy.

In August 2021, it was announced that Love would direct a new crime based series, which he has written, called A Town Called Malice. Love has said: "I'm over excited and hugely grateful to Sky for supporting my vision once again – I have lived and breathed Malice for the past few years, and for it finally to come to fruition, is a dream come true". In April 2023, a month after the series premiered, it was cancelled due to low viewership.

In 2023, it was announced that Love was working on a film called Marching Powder and that Danny Dyer would star in the film.

The film was released to cinemas on Friday 7th March 2025.

Love was a follower of the "casual" culture present in the 1980s, naming Fila and Sergio Tacchini as brands he wore as a youth, something which is present in many of his films.

== Personal life ==
Love was married to EastEnders actress Patsy Palmer from 1998 to 2000.

Love is an avid Millwall fan, having followed the team from a young age. His hobbies include walking and clay pigeon shooting. He lives in West London and has a home in Gloucestershire.

On 4 September 2021, Love wrote in The Times Luxx magazine that he had been struggling with long COVID-19 symptoms and had attended a clinic in Spain, which had successfully treated his condition.

== Filmography ==
=== Film ===
Year	Title	Director	Writer	Producer	Notes
1999	The Escort	No	Yes	No	
1999	Love Story	Yes	Yes	Yes	
2001	Goodbye Charlie Bright	Yes	Yes	No	
2004	The Football Factory	Yes	Yes	No	
2005	The Business	Yes	Yes	No	
2007	Outlaw	Yes	Yes	No	
2009	The Firm	Yes	Yes	No	
2012	The Sweeney	Yes	Yes	No	
2015	American Hero	Yes	Yes	Yes	
2025	Marching Powder	Yes	Yes	No	
TBA	Animol	No	Yes	No	

Producer only

Year	Title	Director	Notes
2011	A Night in the Woods	Richard Parry	

Executive producer only

Year	Title	Director	Notes
2006	Dirty Sanchez: The Movie	Jim Hickey	
2007	WΔZ	Tom Shankland	
2008	Faintheart	Vito Rocco	
2008	Bronson	Nicolas Winding Refn	
2008	The Children	Tom Shankland	
2010	Monsters	Gareth Edwards	
2013	All Stars	Ben Gregor	
2014	Monsters: Dark Continent	Tom Green	
2016	Kill Command	Steven Gomez	

=== Television ===
Year	Title	Director	Writer	Creator	Executive producer	Notes
2018–2021	Bulletproof	Yes	Yes	Yes	Yes	
2023	A Town Called Malice	No	Yes	Yes	Yes	
