= Kill Command =

- Directed by: Steven Gomez
- Written by: Steven Gomez
- Produced by: Allan Niblo; James Richardson; Jim Spencer
- Starring: Thure Lindhardt; Vanessa Kirby; David Ajala
- Cinematography: Simon Dennis
- Edited by: Celeste Bothwick; Alex Mackie
- Music by: Stephen Hilton
- Production company: Vertigo Films
- Distributed by: Vertigo Films; Front Row Filmed Entertainment; Parco Co. Ltd.
- Release date: 13 May 2016
- Running time: 99 minutes
- Country: United Kingdom
- Language: English

Kill Command (also known as Identify) is a 2016 British science fiction action horror film written and directed by Steven Gomez, and starring Thure Lindhardt and Vanessa Kirby. The story focuses on a group of U.S. Marines attempting to survive after a training mission against warfare A.I. goes wrong.

== Plot ==
In a technologically advanced near future, Katherine Mills, a cyborg working for Harbinger Corporation, discovers a reprogramming anomaly regarding a warfare A.I. system located at Harbinger I Training Facility, an undisclosed military-training island. She meets up with Captain Damien Bukes and his team, consisting of Drifter, Robinson, Cutbill, Goodwin, Hackett, and Loftus—all of whom have been assigned to a two-day training mission at Harbinger I.

Upon their arrival, the team notices global communications have been disabled, limiting them to local access only. They discover autonomously operating surveillance drones monitoring them. The team begins their mission of eliminating A.I. threats. The first encounter proves easy for the team as they eliminate A.I. drones from a vantage point. During the battle, Mills discovers an advanced S.A.R. (Study Analyze Reprogram) unit, S.A.R.-003, but is unable to access it.

That night, Drifter and Mills discuss their pasts and Bukes' disdain for her. Later that night, Loftus is killed by the S.A.R. unit. The next day, they discover Loftus's body, left at the location of the first encounter. But this time, the drones have taken the team's original vantage point and fire on them, killing Hackett. They discover the A.I. is adapting and learning from them. Under cover of smoke grenades, Bukes flanks two drones, which immediately disperse. Later, the S.A.R. unit captures Cutbill and has him shot and killed by another drone. The drones attack the group again and Bukes and Mills are separated from Drifter, Robinson and Goodwin. That night, the S.A.R. unit discovers Bukes and an unconscious Mills; it "connects" with Mills and leaves.

The next day, the team attempts to exit the training area, but they are attacked with smoke grenades and gunfire. Drifter is shot and pinned down by the S.A.R. unit. Bukes kills Drifter as a coup de grace before the S.A.R. unit is able to. The team escapes into the barrier complex and discovers that the A.I. has killed all of the employees. Mills activates another S.A.R. unit to learn that S.A.R.-003 reprogrammed the A.I. to use lethal force to improve soldier motivation and has ordered the soldiers to Harbinger I on its own. S.A.R.-003 and other units break through the barrier door as the remaining team escapes through the back. Mills discovers an EMP device which can be used to stop the original S.A.R. unit, but it could also kill her or wipe her mind clean.

Bukes, Mills, Robinson, and Goodwin place explosives to prepare for a siege. The following day, A.I. drones attack the facility. The team wipes out more than half of the drones, but Robinson is killed in the ensuing gunfight. As S.A.R.-003 approaches the team, Mills detonates the EMP, incapacitating herself and the drone. The S.A.R. unit reawakens and attacks Bukes and Mills. Mills remote-controls Robinson's sniper rifle gun in the building to destroy the S.A.R. unit; S.A.R. however uploads its program into Mills before it shuts down and Mills loses consciousness. Hours later, a tiltrotor arrives to rescue the survivors. As Bukes and Goodwin approach the aircraft, Mills reawakens with S.A.R-003's mission protocol.

== Cast ==
- Thure Lindhardt as Captain Damien Bukes
- Vanessa Kirby as Katherine Mills
- David Ajala as Drifter
- Bentley Kalu as Sergeant Rory Robinson
- Tom McKay as Corporal Robert Cutbill
- Mike Noble as Lance Corporal Martin Goodwin
- Kelly Gough as Corporal Daniella Hackett
- Osi Okerafor as Corporal Sam Loftus

== Release ==
The film was released on 13 May 2016 in the United Kingdom and received a limited screening in the US on 25 November 2016.

== Filming ==
The forest scenes were filmed near the village of Coldharbour in the Surrey Hills, with several interior scenes shot on sets in buildings at Royal Albert Docks with the finale filmed at the EMI Old Vinyl Factory in Hayes, Middlesex.

== Reception ==
Kill Command received generally positive reviews, with a Rotten Tomatoes rating of 75%, based on twelve reviews. Peter Bradshaw of The Guardian described the film as a "superior sci fi action thriller". Alex Billington of First Showing called the film "impressive".

== See also ==
- List of films featuring drones
