= American Hero (film) =

- Directed by: Nick Love
- Written by: Nick Love
- Produced by: Allan Niblo; James Richardson; Nick Love
- Starring: Stephen Dorff; Eddie Griffin
- Cinematography: Simon Dennis
- Edited by: Richard Graham
- Music by: Lorne Balfe
- Production company: Vertigo Films
- Distributed by: Vertigo Films (United Kingdom); Screen Media Films (United States)
- Release dates: October 2, 2015 (Busan International Film Festival); December 11, 2015 (United States); July 4, 2017 (United Kingdom)
- Running time: 86 minutes
- Countries: United Kingdom; United States
- Language: English
- Budget: $1 million

American Hero is a 2015 independent superhero comedy film written and directed by Nick Love. A British-American co-production, it stars Stephen Dorff as a hard-partying alcoholic with telekinetic powers who, after a life-changing event, resolves to follow a more heroic lifestyle. Screen Media Films released it in the US on December 11, 2015.

== Plot ==
Lucille, a crippled man who is in a wheelchair from injuries sustained in the Gulf War, searches New Orleans for his friend Melvin so a documentary crew can follow Melvin. They find him passed out on the street. Melvin, an alcoholic and drug abuser, is in a downward spiral and spends most of his time partying with his friends. His estranged ex-wife, Doreen, has filed a restraining order against him and taken sole custody of their young son, Rex. Lucille wants Melvin to clean up and get sober, but Melvin only makes empty promises to eventually get his life together.

Lucas, a science teacher at the local community college, performs regular tests on Melvin, who has telekinetic powers—the ability to move objects with his mind. Lucas cannot explain this except that Melvin has a slightly different brain structure than ordinary people. Melvin will not see a specialist, despite Lucas' urging. Besides Lucas' tests, Melvin uses his powers to perform street shows for drug money. Lucille, however, blames the local drug dealer, Nathan, of being behind violence in the neighborhood and does not like him. This is echoed by Jimmy, a local cop.

After a night of hard partying, Melvin's heart stops. When he wakes up, the doctors tell him that he has been clinically dead for several minutes. Changed by this experience, Melvin announces that he intends to become sober for the sake of Rex. Impressed, Jimmy requests that Melvin help clean up the neighborhood. After practicing his abilities with Lucille, and despite Lucas's urging that he wasn't ready, Melvin confronts Nathan's gang and threatens them. Nathan had Lucille shot in retaliation. After Lucille tells him to leave him alone, Melvin falls back into alcoholism, terrorizing nearby people and destroying houses. Melvin in a depressive stupor, buys drugs and parties with a friend who was recently released from jail, falling back where he started.

Nathan sends his men to kill Melvin and his friends, but Melvin protects them by stopping the bullets. After seeing Nathan sell drugs to children, Melvin goes sober again and reconciles with Lucille. Together, they resume Melvin's training, concluding with him being able to disassemble a car and reassemble it with ease. After visiting Jimmy and telling him to ignore any calls he receives about Nathan, Melvin attacks Nathan and his gang by launching cars and scrap metal at them and violently disassembling their firearms using his newly sharpened telekinetic abilities. The confrontation ends with Melvin chasing Nathan into a building before bringing it all crashing down around them both, chasing the rest of Nathan's gang out of town, putting an end to their drug dealing.

Afterwards, Melvin as a token of their renewed friendship and as thanks for his teachings, unveils a new, sporty wheelchair he created for Lucille. Afterward, Melvin approaches Doreen despite the risk of being arrested for violating the restraining order, hands her a large sum of money in child support, and requests to be able to take Rex home from school. Although skeptical, Doreen agrees, Melvin and his son Rex are seen riding together on a bike on the way home from school, enjoying each other's company.

== Cast ==
- Stephen Dorff as Melvin
- Eddie Griffin as Lucille
- Luis Da Silva as Lyle
- Christopher Berry as Danny
- Yohance Myles as Lucas
- Andrea Cohen as Eileen
- Raeden Greer as Clarice
- King Orba as Jimmy
- Countrified Wedman as Nathan
- Jonathan Billions as Rex
- Keena Ferguson as Doreen

== Production ==
Shooting took place mostly in the Algiers Point neighborhood of New Orleans, Louisiana.

== Release ==
Screen Media Films released American Hero on December 11, 2015.

== Reception ==
Rotten Tomatoes, a review aggregator, reports that three of ten surveyed critics gave the film a positive review; the average rating is 4.5/10. Metacritic rated it 42/100 based on six reviews. Frank Scheck of The Hollywood Reporter wrote that it "has some amusing moments", but it has too much filler and "never quite decides what it wants to be". John Hazelton of Screen Daily called it "a likeable if lightweight indie dramedy" that substitutes filler for drama or character development. Maitland McDonagh of Film Journal International called Melvin likeable, and Neil Genzlinger of The New York Times called him unlikeable; both said that the film was a clichéd comedy-drama with a minor twist. Gary Goldstein of the Los Angeles Times praised the film's "enticingly quirky sensibility", saying that it has both charm and heart due to strong performances by Dorff and Griffin. Aaron Hillis of The Village Voice called it "a flaccid bromantic comedy".

== See also ==
- Hancock
