= Outlaw (2007 film) =

2007 British film by Nick Love

- UK promotional movie poster for the film
- Directed by: Nick Love
- Written by: Nick Love
- Produced by: Guy Pearson; Crystal Ambrose; Jeff Kingsland; Ben Morris; Paul Morris; Lynn Fensome
- Starring: Sean Bean; Danny Dyer; Sean Harris; Bob Hoskins; Lennie James; Rupert Friend
- Cinematography: Sam McCurdy
- Edited by: Stuart Gazzard
- Music by: David Julyan
- Production companies: Ingenious Film Partners; Vertigo Films
- Distributed by: Pathé
- Release date: 9 March 2007
- Running time: 103 minutes
- Country: United Kingdom
- Language: English
- Budget: £2.5 million
- Box office: £1.5 million

Outlaw is a 2007 British action-thriller film written and directed by British filmmaker Nick Love. Outlaw stars Sean Bean, Danny Dyer, Bob Hoskins, Lennie James, Rupert Friend and Sean Harris.

The film is set in Britain in 2007. Sean Bean plays a soldier who returns home from duty to find that the country for which he has been fighting has become a war zone itself thanks to rampant crime. He joins forces with likeminded people to take on the evil that threatens to take over his home.

== Plot ==
The film begins by exploring stories involving a number of different characters who live in and around London, all of whom have experiences which lead them to believe that justice in the country is not being handed out fairly. These characters include nice guy white-collar worker Gene Dekker (Danny Dyer), who is brutally beaten by a yob after colliding with his car. Danny Bryant (Sean Bean) is a paratrooper who has seen action in the Falklands, Afghanistan and Iraq and who arrives back from abroad to find his wife with someone else, and also believes that the state of the country is worse than the war-torn places he has recently served in. Crown Court prosecution barrister Cedric Munroe (Lennie James) receives death threats towards his pregnant wife, being told they will only be safe if he pulls out of the case against club owner and heroin dealer Terry Manning (Rob Fry), a boss of the criminal underworld, whom Munroe is currently prosecuting. University of Cambridge student Sandy Mardell (Rupert Friend), and son of Bryant's former commanding officer, has only recently left hospital, though the thugs who scarred him for life in an unprovoked physical attack were released from prison before he had made his recovery.

Through the help of jingoistic hotel security guard and former football hooligan Simon Hillier (Sean Harris), who has a connection to all the men in one form or another, the men are united – Munroe had previously defended him in court, Dekker had gone to school with him, and Bryant stays in the hotel where he works. The men form a vigilante gang, targeting individuals whom they determine to be a threat to society. Information on said targets is provided to them by Munroe's police contact Walter Lewis (Bob Hoskins), one of the few police officers who is not corrupt and who has been demoted to work behind a desk by his superiors. The men work through targets associated with Manning, whose men went ahead with their threat against Munroe's pregnant wife, killing her and their unborn child. The men use firearms Bryant stole from active duty with the army.

The gang attracts media attention and become known as the "Outlaws", but get themselves into trouble when they reveal their identities to one of Manning's men, Ian Furlong, yet fail to kill him. As a result, Furlong kills Lewis, and Bryant, the leader of the outlaws, is subsequently framed for the murder. Following this, the gang members go their separate ways, though not before Bryant hangs Hillier for being a liability, questioning his authority and insulting his wife.

As they all go back to their day-to-day lives, Manning is released from custody owing to lack of evidence. Bryant confronts Furlong in a pub regarding Manning's location, and shoots Furlong in the head, killing him. Dekker receives word from his friend and colleague Frank Lordish that he learned from his brother that Manning is hiding in the countryside. When he realises that he cannot live a quiet life while letting Manning get away, Dekker flees his wedding to contact Munroe. The pair contact Mardell, who, after meeting Bryant, decides that they will not survive the attack on Manning's home. Bryant, Munroe and Dekker infiltrate Manning's home, yet quickly discover that it is an ambush, with armed police soon arriving outside, led by the corrupt Sgt. Grieves (George Anton) of the Flying Squad, who is in league with Manning.

The three Outlaws engage in a gunfight with the police and manage to flee into the woods for one final showdown. Dekker is shot in the shoulder and Bryant is killed while advancing towards the armed response squad and shooting at them. Munroe willingly surrenders, only to be murdered by the now blatantly corrupt police officers. When it appears that all the vigilantes are dead, Dekker is revealed to still be alive, and was playing dead. Though pursued by gunshots, he successfully escapes through the forest.

The final scene shows Frank being handed an envelope of cash by Terry Manning in his workplace's car park. As the crime lord begins to drive away, he is abruptly confronted by a gun-wielding Dekker, who points the gun directly at Manning's face. Manning taunts Dekker, saying: "You haven't got the bollocks, son," to which Dekker smiles menacingly and pulls the trigger.

== Cast ==
- Sean Bean as Danny Bryant
- Danny Dyer as Gene Dekker
- Bob Hoskins as Walter Lewis
- Lennie James as Cedric Munroe
- Sean Harris as Simon Hillier
- Rupert Friend as Sandy Mardell
- Sally Bretton as Kelly
- Rob Fry as Terry Manning
- Dave Legeno as Ian Furlong
- Andy Parfitt as Frank Lordish
- George Anton as Sergeant Grieves

== Production ==
The film was largely shot on location in Gloucestershire, with Lydney Harbour Industrial Estate, Gloucester Quays, Cheltenham's Thistle Hotel and the previous Windmill pub on Eastgate Street all featuring in the film.

== Release ==
Outlaw entered the UK box office at No. 5 in its first week, but then dropped before closing at many cinemas. The DVD was released on 9 July 2007.

== Reception ==
Outlaw opened to highly negative reviews from critics upon its release; the Daily Mirror slammed the film, calling it "simplistic" and "muddled" and giving it 2/5 and 1/5 in their Friday and Sunday issues, respectively. The Guardian described it as "ugly, naive and deeply unpleasant: crime-revenge-porn without any style or wit or convincing narrative". Ali Catterall of Channel 4 Film described the film as Death Wish written by the Daily Mail. Empire panned it in their one-star assessment, stating that the film "descends into a sickening sludge of childish politics, brutality and creative swearing".

In some media outlets, the film has even been described as 'irresponsible' and 'exploitative'. The Independent stated that the film "is as unconvincing as it is unpleasant" and that it "may be a sincere expression of Nick Love's own ambivalence, but it makes for a faltering film." Wendy Ide of The Times called it "a rage-spewing hate crime of a movie... It’s not the explicit violence and primal anger that is worrying, it’s the fact that Love may be tapping into something simmering in the nation’s psyche. Or worse, inflaming it." As of 2011, Outlaw has a score of 21% on Rotten Tomatoes based on reviews from 19 critics.

One unlikely outcome of Outlaw's negative critical reception was the cult popularity of a clip featuring director Nick Love and actor Danny Dyer discussing the film's critical mauling, taken from the film's DVD commentary and posted on YouTube. On his blog, the comedy writer Graham Linehan called the clip his "favourite moment of accidental comedy of the last five years" while Guardian newspaper film critic Peter Bradshaw compared Love and Dyer to a real life Derek and Clive.
