= The Football Factory (film) =

2004 sports drama film by Nick Love

- Promotional poster
- Directed by: Nick Love
- Written by: AJ Lovell
- Based on: The Football Factory by John King
- Produced by: Allan Niblo; James Richardson
- Starring: Danny Dyer; Frank Harper; Tamer Hassan; Roland Manookian; Neil Maskell; Dudley Sutton
- Narrated by: Jonathan Heywood
- Cinematography: Damian Bromley
- Edited by: Stuart Gazzard
- Music by: Ivor Guest
- Production companies: Vertigo Films; Rockstar Games
- Distributed by: Vertigo Films
- Release date: 14 May 2004
- Running time: 90 minutes
- Country: United Kingdom
- Language: English
- Box office: £623,138

The Football Factory is a 2004 sports drama film written by AJ Lovell and directed by Nick Love and starring Danny Dyer, Tamer Hassan, Frank Harper, Roland Manookian, Neil Maskell and Dudley Sutton. The film is loosely based on the novel of the same name by John King and the first foray into filmmaking by video game producers Rockstar Games (publishers of games such as the Grand Theft Auto series, among others), credited as executive producers. The film was released in the United Kingdom on 14 May 2004.

== Plot ==
Tommy Johnson is a member of a violent Chelsea hooligan firm. His friends and fellow hooligans include Tommy's best friend Rod King, the hot-tempered Billy Bright, and impulsive younger members Zeberdee and Raff. Tommy spends his days drinking, using drugs, womanising and fighting, much to the disappointment of his grandfather Bill Farrell, a pensioner and veteran who plans to move to Australia with his best friend Albert.

Tommy has an epiphany about his lifestyle during a fight with the Tottenham hooligan firm. Tommy, Billy and Rod are arrested for assaulting two Stoke City fans whilst travelling to an away match. These actions draw the fury of Harris (Tony Denham), the leader of the Chelsea firm, whose attempts to keep order are thwarted by Billy's aggressive outbursts.

Tommy, Billy and Rod have to attend court in order to answer for their behaviour. Rod begins a relationship with Tamara, the court clerk present at their court hearing, and she pressures him to skip his weekend meets. Zeberdee and his friend Raff accidentally burgle Billy's house and are forced to stand in his living room, whilst Billy's children throw darts at them as punishment, with one of the children kicking Zeberdee in his loins. Billy deals with his increasing loneliness after he overhears Harris discussing his irrelevance and unreliability. Bill's plan to retire to Australia are postponed, when Albert dies the night before they are to leave.

Early in the film, Tommy is caught and held hostage by the brother of Sian (Michele Hallak), a girl he picked up at a club. He is saved when Rod hits the man on the head with a cricket bat and they both run away from the house. Sian's brother turns out to also be the brother of the rival Millwall firm's leader, Fred, who then hunts Tommy down throughout the entire film. The film culminates in a pitched battle between the Chelsea and Millwall firms. Rod (after a few espressos and a line of cocaine), leaves a dinner with Tamara's parents after offending them, and attends the "meet", much to the joy of Tommy who is glad that his friend showed up for the meet. Tommy is severely beaten by Fred and a group of Millwall hooligans, with a brick being smashed into his face, and ends up in the hospital with Bill, who, in the meantime, has suffered a heart attack after confronting Zeberdee and Raf on the bus over racist comments they made to two foreign nationals.

At the end of the film, a crippled Tommy decides that his place is at the firm with his friends, Bill gets cured and moves to Australia and Billy Bright is incarcerated for seven years in HMP Full Sutton, near York, after being arrested at the Millwall meet (whilst saving Harris from being arrested). Zeberdee is killed by a drug dealer, whom he and Raff had previously mugged, fulfilling a recurring nightmare that tormented Tommy throughout the film. In a pre-credits slideshow, Tommy is shown to have since moved on to watching Rugby. However, this is only a joke and he has not actually started to watch rugby.

== Cast ==
- Danny Dyer — Tommy Johnson, a disillusioned twenty-nine-year-old, who lives for the weekend football matches. The build-up of the derby between Millwall and Chelsea causes his life and mental-health to deteriorate as he tries to escape from his dangerous surroundings.
- Frank Harper — Billy Bright is a man around forty, part of the older generation of the Firm. Throughout the film it is shown that he wants to be the leader of the firm but lacks the composure needed.
- Neil Maskell — Rod King, Tommy's best friend and sidekick, carelessly strolling along the path led by his mates.
- Roland Manookian — Zeberdee, younger breed coming through the ranks of Chelsea, his life has already run into a cul-de-sac of crime and drugs. With nothing to lose and no one to look out for him, Zeberdee aspires to be a future top boy; unfortunately, his naivety gets him into trouble.
- Calum MacNab — Raff, Zeberdee's best friend who is a petty thief and drug addict.
- Tamer Hassan — Fred, the vicious head of the rival Millwall hooligan firm, an arch enemy of Chelsea. The war begins when Tommy gets caught by Fred’s brother having a one-night stand with their sister, and retribution is wanted.
- Dudley Sutton — Bill Farrell, a representative of the older generation from a bygone era, a D-Day veteran in his late seventies, who lives out the remainder of his days with childhood friend Albert Moss; they plan to retire in Australia and Bill eventually does move out there to live out the rest of his days in the sun.
- John Junkin — Albert Moss, friend of Bill Farrell and a war hero who kept his friend alive through his determination to live.
- Jamie Foreman — A racist taxi driver, who is never afraid of letting his customers know his true feelings about society and immigration.
- Tony Denham — Tony Harris, the Chelsea firm's head, who runs it like a military unit, taking a register and organising events.
- Sophie Linfield — Tamara, a court clerk who becomes Rod's girlfriend.
- Michele Hallak — Shian, Tameka's friend at the nightclub.
- Kara Tointon — Tameka, a girl at a nightclub who is picked up by Tommy and is revealed to be Fred and Terry's sister.
- Lin Blakley — Tamara's mother
- Daniel Naylor — Fred's brother.
- Alison Egan — Bright's wife and the mother of his children.
- Danny Kelly — Radio announcer
- Pete Stevens — Radio announcer

== Themes ==
The film heavily explores male friendship, the role of banter in friendships, how conflict is dealt with, how friendships grow and how they fall apart.

The film also explores football hooliganism and the sub-culture prevalent in English football in the early 2000s. This includes the role of CCTV, fashion and transport in facilitating violence.

The film also delves into grief and how different characters cope with it. Whether grieving a lifelong friend or a friend on the terraces that betrays, the film explores grief in all its various guises.

The film also explores the one-night stand culture, how men and women interact when out on nights out and the far reaching adverse consequences that can flower as a result.

The film also explores nihilism and hopelessness, along with disillusionment in early adulthood men . The film also explores the role of drugs and acquisitive crime, including organized drugs dealing, importation, the rave scene, money laundering, theft, burglary and robbery.

The film also explores the zenith of pub culture in Britain. A meeting place for all of the generations and their role in working class communities.

The film also explores socio-economic class disparity in romantic relationships. Rod and his partner are from very different classes and this generates conflict and issues.

The film also briefly touches on AIDS and gay rights campaigning by way of Rod wearing a common pink bowed badge that was used at the time to express support for these causes.

The film also explores feelings of jealously and resentment by way of Billy's feelings towards Harris.

The film also explores betrayal and feeling let down by way of Billy discovering that Harris has been badmouthing him behind his back.

The film also explores feelings of inferiority and unworthiness, as Billy has to deal with when speaking with his wife after he has been betrayed and let down by Harris.

The film also explores violence and murder connected to organized crime, including vengeful behaviour and shooting as a means of resolving past problems.

The film also explores cockney rhyming slang, a local dialect that is vast becoming extinct in many areas of London. Zeberdee tells Billy he was only 'having a bubble' (meaning bubble bath-laugh). Billy calls this 'muggy rhyming slang' and berates him for its use, showing that the accent is unpopular amongst some Londoners.

The film also delves into the role of fear in potential conflict, as is demonstrated when Tommy has to see Billy and plead not be beaten as a result of a joke that Tommy is not in on but is the subject of.

The film also considers the moral and ideological differences between different generations. Some characters that represent the younger generations in the film believe that violence is cool or necessary whilst the older generation (Bill and Albert) turn against racism, violence and hatred and focus on living well and living in peace.

== Reception ==
=== Critical response ===
The Football Factory received mixed reviews from critics. On the review aggregator website Rotten Tomatoes, 38% of 8 critics' reviews are positive, with an average rating of 4.70/10.

=== Box office ===
The Football Factory grossed a total of £623,138 in the United Kingdom.

=== Cultural influence ===
In 2004, Chelsea F.C. football supporters' fanzine cfcuk produced a special edition to coincide with the release of the film.

== See also ==
- The Real Football Factories
- Football hooliganism
- Marching Powder
