= Marching Powder (film) =

- Theatrical release poster
- Directed by: Nick Love
- Screenplay by: Nick Love
- Produced by: Chris Clark; Will Clarke
- Starring: Danny Dyer
- Cinematography: Simon Stolland
- Edited by: Pani Scott
- Music by: Alfie Godfrey
- Production companies: True Brit Entertainment; Altitude Film Entertainment; Rogue State
- Distributed by: True Brit Entertainment (United Kingdom)
- Release date: 7 March 2025
- Running time: 96 minutes
- Country: United Kingdom
- Language: English

Marching Powder is a 2025 British comedy-drama film written and directed by Nick Love. It stars Danny Dyer as Jack Jones, a man given a short period to change his behaviour following an arrest for drugs and violence.

== Plot ==
After being arrested for fighting and cocaine possession during a football hooligan brawl, Jack is ordered by the court to go to couples' therapy for six weeks. Unable to keep a job, he lives off of his father-in-law Ron's money under the condition that he watch over Ron's schizophrenic son Kenny Boy.

Jack attempts to stay off of drugs and away from hooligan fighting for the sake of his relationship and his young son, while his wife Dani goes back to art school to recover what she sacrificed to be a stay-at-home mother.

== Cast ==
- Danny Dyer as Jack Jones
- Stephanie Leonidas as Dani Jones
- Calum MacNab as Kenny Boy
- Arty Dyer as JJ
- Bailey Patrick as Vinny
- Lex Shrapnel as Vaughn
- Janet Kumah as Gloria
- Geoff Bell as Ron
- Joe Jackson as Deano
- Dean Harrison as Roger
- Leon Dean as Fisher
- Phillip Ray Tommy as Ziggy (as Philip Ray Tommy)
- Duke Carrigan as Jason
- Liam Scott as Miller
- Philippe Brenninkmeyer as Judge
- Rob Auton as Skip
- Dean Christie as Barman
- Stanley J. Browne as Jeff
- Henry St. George as Gareth
- Florence St. George as Fi
- Barney White as Lionel
- Myles Charles-Jones as Lyle
- Donna Sherifi as Libby
- Blair Gyabaah as Simeon
- Declan Doyle as Ink Sleeve
- Jade Dowsett-Roberts as Girl (credit only)
- Julian Keeling as Junkie
- Daniel Fearn as Screw
- Allesandro Gruttadauria as Pepe
- Savannah Power as Conservative Party Member
- Jennifer Lane as Conservative Party Member
- Jemma Geanaus as Labour Party Member (as Jemma Geanus)
- George Taylor as Labour Party Member
- Omar Ibrahim as Green Party Member
- Connor Boyles as Green Party Member
- Faisal Al-Khater as Commuter
- Milo Hardy as Young Trendy
- Wanja Mary Sellers as Rosa
- Stuart Mcloughlin as Football Commentator (voice)
- Polly Coombes as Portaloo (voice)
- Stephen Lyons as Animation Narrator (voice)
- Teddy Jackson as David
- Iris St. George as Sarah
- Camden Frances as Young Jack (voice)

== Production ==
The film was produced by Chris Clark and Will Clarke, with Zygi Kamasa and Andy Mayson credited as executive producers. It was produced by True Brit Entertainment and Altitude Film Entertainment. The BBFC lists the production year as 2024.

== Release ==
The film was released theatrically in the United Kingdom and Ireland on 7 March 2025. It has a running time of 96 minutes. In Ireland it was classified 18 by the IFCO. In the United Kingdom it was classified 18 by the BBFC. The BBFC record also notes a compulsory digital substitution to remove a potentially indecent image involving a child, made in accordance with the Protection of Children Act 1978.

== Reception ==
The Firm holds a 33% approval rating at review aggregator site Rotten Tomatoes based on the opinions of 12 critics.

Peter Bradshaw of The Guardian gave the film a rating of three out of five stars, suggesting the film was broad, unsubtle, and with a cheerfully nonjudgemental attitude to drugs, itterating, that a rare 18 certificate heightened the movies attraction, given the film's laidback attitude to underage consumption of adult porn. He suggested the movie had energy and chutzpah with some laughs.

Helen O'Hara of Empire gave the film a rating of two out of five stars, suggesting films about bad people, and redemption stories, sometimes result in a sinner becoming a saint. However, making a film about someone bad, not seeking redemption, only driven by grievance, expressing contempt, and completely unjustified superiority over the audience, is hard to create. Radio Times gave the film two out of five stars and characterised it as a reunion of Love and Dyer, commenting on the film's violence and drug-taking as central to its tone.
