= Goodbye Charlie Bright =

2001 film by Nick Love

- Goodbye Charlie Bright poster
- Directed by: Nick Love
- Written by: Dominic Eames; Nick Love
- Produced by: Lisa Bryer; Charles Steel
- Starring: Phil Daniels; Danny Dyer; Paul Nicholls; Roland Manookian; Jamie Foreman; Dani Behr; Richard Driscoll
- Narrated by: Paul Nicholls
- Cinematography: Tony Imi
- Edited by: Patrick Moore
- Music by: Ivor Guest
- Production company: Bonaparte Films
- Distributed by: Metrodome Distribution
- Release date: 11 May 2001
- Running time: 87 minutes
- Country: United Kingdom
- Language: English
- Budget: £2 million
- Box office: £40,571

Goodbye Charlie Bright is a 2001 comedy-drama film directed by Nick Love and starring Paul Nicholls, Roland Manookian and Danny Dyer. The film is also known by the U.S. title Strong Boys.

== Plot ==
Charlie drifts through life as he and his friends enjoy a lifestyle of house parties, petty crime, fashion, casual sex and drugs. However, after breaking into a house to rob it, Charlie finds a gun (they found the keys and address in a handbag they had recently stolen). During the robbery, three of the friends (Charlie, Justin and Damien) accidentally awaken the owner, a hefty Jamaican man who promptly chases them into the street with a golf club. The trio escape, much to the amusement of Justin and Damien. However, despite Charlie promising to tell Justin everything, he decides to keep the gun a secret.

Sometime later the story picks up Charlie and Justin as they walk through a disused car park. After looking in the window of a BMW it becomes clear that Julie, the girlfriend of Francis (Dyer), another member of 'The Firm', is having sex with 'local nutter' Eddie (Phil Daniels), who is some 20 years older, despite the fact she is pregnant with Francis' baby. By this time in the story it has become clear that Charlie is dissatisfied with his lifestyle and would prefer to try to make something of his life, unlike Justin, who would clearly prefer things to remain the same and remain on the estate for life. This point is highlighted when the two attend a party being thrown by Charlie's cousin Hector "Heccy" Moriati (Richard Driscoll), with Charlie being offered a job as an estate agent. Hector eventually throws Justin out as he finds out he is a low-life pikey Leeds United fan, and Hector in turn asks Charlie to stay (which he does not). Hector tells Charlie not to come back to his house, signalling the end of his chances of securing a job with Hector. On the way back home from the party, the pair begin to fight, Charlie clearly furious that Justin has ruined an opportunity for him to turn his life around. Charlie, as the narrator, informs the audience that from that point on 'something changed, things could never be the same'.

The following day Charlie approaches Francis in the street and the pair head off to a boxing gym where Francis announces his intention to propose to Julie, declaring that he is 'loved up'. Charlie tells Francis about Julie's affair with Eddie. Francis, in a tearful rage, walks out of the room and goes on the hunt for Eddie, baseball bat in hand. When Francis eventually finds Eddie he smashes the window of his BMW, provoking Eddie to run him down. Charlie then arrives as Francis lies unconscious in the road. As Charlie waits in hospital he is visibly moved by an upset woman, presumably Francis's mother, and decides to take revenge on Eddie with the stolen pistol. After finding Eddie he loses his nerve, prompting Eddie to tell him to 'Fuck off out my house before you and I fall out'. After leaving, Charlie eventually shows the gun to Justin, who becomes very attached to it and suggests that they should kill Eddie.

Justin is later insulted by a child on the playground in the estate and threatens him with the gun, going as far as pushing the barrel into the frightened boy's mouth. Horrified, Charlie snatches the gun from Justin and tells him he no longer wishes to be associated with him. A distressed Justin tries to make amends but Charlie refuses, instead giving him the gun as a farewell gift. Instantly Justin runs off, pursued by Charlie who has realised that Justin intends to use the weapon. Charlie catches up to Justin but only watches as Justin shoots Eddie in the leg (he survives the shot and is heard shouting afterwards) and the pair make their way to the top of a high rise building. The police arrive and Justin tells Charlie to leave or risk being arrested. Charlie seemingly forgives Justin and the two hug, parting ways forever. Justin tells Charlie that it 'is alright' and that he can leave him now.

The final scene shows the pair going down different paths: Justin turning himself in to the police with a smile on his face and with a crowd cheering for him, and Charlie as he packs his bags and leaves. A child (who makes several appearances throughout the film) tells Charlie that Eddie has been shot and killed, and asks Charlie where he's going as he leaves; he simply replies "Somewhere". We never know what happens to Charlie, all we know is that he is free from the chains that held him back.

== Themes ==
The film explores fashion and the South London fashion that was prevalent in the late 1990s and early 2000s in the United Kingdom.

The film also explores the music of that era through the soundtrack.

The film heavily explores male friendship, how they are forged, sustained, how conflicts are dealt with and how young men bond with one another. Though never expressly discussed in dialogue, homoeroticism is an undercurrent of certain parts of the film. A core part of Nick Love's work through time is the exploration of male bonding in working class communities.

The film also explores dating, especially in regard to a younger man dating an older women. Though only briefly explored, Charlie and Blondie's relationship forms part of a wider narrative.

The film also explores acquisitive crime, the use of drugs and the procurement and usage of illegal firearms.

The film also explores the relationship between a father and son, and how that relationship functions when a divorce has taken place.

The film also affects the nature of divorce and how it affects young adults as they move from teenager years to adulthood.

The film also explores the effects of drug addiction on children. By example, Justin acts out in extreme ways when confronted with issues that touch on his late father's addiction.

The film also explores use of recreational drugs such as cocaine.

Moreover, the film also looks at transitioning between being a teenager and moving on into adulthood, emphasising how people move in different directions, how people change as they come towards key life events and how fate takes over to decide how situations play out.

The film also explores war and the effect it has on the minds of those that fought. Eddie is a Falklands War veteran who comes back angry, in pain and ready to cause harm to others.

Furthermore, the film explores impersonation as a method of personality alteration. Tony Immaculate pretends to be a cowboy throughout the film and pretends to be of American descent. Paul, who pretends to be Heccy, also impersonates an upper-middle class gentleman, losing his native South London accent.

The film also explores poverty in working-class communities in London. This is includes how people provide for family and friends, and wealth inequality is also explored in the film.

The film also explores the personality altering effects that money can cause, with a comparison being drawn between the lads on the estate and the more affluent Heccy.

The film also briefly explores the importance of football in the lives of young men. Charlie, Justin and Charlie's father all follow Millwall F.C.. Posters on Charlie's wall, his wearing of the club kit and his chat with his dad about Millwall winning a recent away game all show the importance of football in their lives and how it can be used to build conversation and break ice.

The film also delves into infidelity and the poisonous consequences it can have on those directly affected and those that know those affected.

The film also explores the nature of fate, of how one character seemed bound to be the anti-hero character and the other seemed bound to move forward and to do something different with his life.

The film also explores different disordered personality types. Eddie, for example, exhibits traits of Antisocial personality disorder. Heccy exhibits traits of Narcissistic personality disorder. Eddie and Heccy can both be seen as Type A personalities, whereas Charlie, Justin, Tommy and others exhibit Type B personalities.

The film explores expressions of intelligence, such as when Charlie is seen playing chess and is then called a 'clever fucker' by his dad in a funny and affectionate way. Charlie is seen as intelligent, sharp and 'the brains of the family' according to Heccy.

The film also explores big changes in the lives of young people. Tommy, for example, goes off to join the British Army whilst Charlie is deciding his future and Justin is bending towards greater harm and problems.

The film also explores cockney rhyming slang and the general culture of South London.

- Paul Nicholls as Charlie Bright
- Roland Manookian as Justin
- Phil Daniels as Eddie
- Jamie Foreman as Tony Immaculate
- Danny Dyer as Francis
- David Thewlis as Charlie's dad
- Dani Behr as Blondie
- Richard Driscoll as Hector
- Sid Mitchell as Tommy Mitchell
- Nicola Stapleton as Julie
- Brian Jordan as Duke
- Frank Harper as Tommy's dad
- Lucy Bowen as Duke's girlfriend
- Sian Welsh as Janet
- Brinsley Forde as Floyd
- Sally Bretton as Susan
- Alexis Rodney as Damien
- Tameka Empson as Kay
- Rajeev Ahya as Gang Youth 1

== Filming locations ==
The opening scene was filmed on the Alexandra Estate, Camden.

Much of the film was filmed on the Cambridge Road Estate, Kingston Upon Thames. The estate is now being demolished and new flats are already being offered to the public. As of July 2026, most of the estate remains as it was.

It is believed that some of the film was filmed in Deptford on location.

== Costume Styles ==
Many of the characters in the film wear brands that are common in the South London area. These brands include Lacoste, Ralph Lauren, Reebok, Hackett London, Stone Island and many others.

A Rolex watch makes an appearance in the film, as does shirts and shorts that are the official kit merchandise of Millwall F.C..

Nick Love focussed on bright colours for his characters, accentuating a summer look that is bright and colourful, moving away from the stereotype of council estates being grey and glum. He was concerned about making films that were glum and without colour, wanting them to be eye catching and entertaining.

Ffion Elinor was the costume designer on the film and explained that she did field research at a [[Millwall F.C.]] match and noticed how many youngsters at games dressed how the characters ended up dressing like.

== Critical reaction ==
The Sun labelled the film 'Hilarious, terrifying, tender, an awesome rollercoaster ride you won't want to get off.'
