= List of Zorro (1990 TV series) episodes =

This is a list of episodes for the 1990 television series Zorro. There were 88 episodes (approx: 24mins each). First season episodes 8-13 "The Legend Begins" was released as a video with some extended footage. Fourth season episodes 10-13 released as a video "A Conspiracy of Blood" with some extended footage.

== Series overview ==
Season	Episodes	Originally released	
Season	Episodes	First released	Last released
Pilot		Unaired	
1	25	January 5, 1990	May 25, 1990
2	25	September 14, 1990	February 25, 1991
3	25	September 1, 1991	April 25, 1992
4	13	October 10, 1992	January 30, 1993

== Pilot episode ==
Title	Directed by	Written by	Original release date
"Zorro: The Legend Continues"	Richard Sarafian	Dan Gordon	Unaired
Antonio de la Cruz returns to California when his father becomes ill. The town is under the control of a ruthless Alcalde with a plan to trap Antonio's childhood hero, Zorro (Diego de la Vega). In his escape, with Antonio's help, from the trap, Zorro is fatally wounded and before he dies passes the mask of Zorro to Antonio. Filmed at Texas Hollywood, Almeria, Spain.

== Episodes ==
=== Season 1 (1990) ===
Filmed at studios outside Madrid, Spain.

No. overall	No. in season	Title	Directed by	Written by	Original release date	Prod. code
1	1	"Dead Men Tell No Tales"	Ron Satlof	Phillip John Taylor	January 5, 1990	89101
Victoria is accused of murder.
2	2	"Deceptive Heart"	Ron Satlof	Bruce Lansbury	January 12, 1990	89108
Diego is suspicious of his father's fiancée, whom Don Alejandro has never actually met except through correspondence.
3	3	"Water"	Michael Vejar	Ron Friedman	January 19, 1990	89109
During a severe drought, the Alcalde monopolizes the pueblo's water supply.
4	4	"Double Entendre"	Ron Satlof	Robert L. McCullough	January 26, 1990	89113
The Alcalde hires a professional swordsman to discredit Zorro by impersonating him.
5	5	"The Best Man"	Ron Satlof	Robert L. McCullough	February 2, 1990	89104
Rafael de la Vega's fiancée is found to have a major crush on Zorro, much to the displeasure of both Rafael and Victoria.
6	6	"The Sure Thing"	Michael Vejar	Robert L. McCullough	February 9, 1990	89118
To get rich, a farmer gambles everything.
7	7	"Zorro's Other Woman"	Michael Vejar	Greg O'Neil	February 16, 1990	89111
Zorro becomes the guardian of a kidnapped baby, but (thanks to the Alcalde) finds himself accused as the kidnapper.
8	8	"The Legend Begins: Part 1"	Ray Austin	Robert L. McCullough	February 17, 1990	89123
9	9	"The Legend Begins: Part 2"	Ray Austin	Robert L. McCullough	February 17, 1990	89124
10	10	"The Legend Begins: Part 3"	Ray Austin	Robert L. McCullough	February 17, 1990	89125
11	11	"The Legend Begins: Part 4"	Ray Austin	Robert L. McCullough	February 17, 1990	89126
While being chased by Mendoza and his troopers, Zorro falls into a gully and, semi-conscious, remembers how he became Zorro. All the while, the Alcalde's soldiers are closing in. This originally aired as a made-for-cable movie based on the series.
12	12	"Pride of the Pueblo"	Michael Levine	Ted Alben & Greg Klein	February 23, 1990	89119
The Alcalde forces a black man to fight for his freedom. Philip Michael Thomas guest stars.
13	13	"Honor Thy Father"	Ron Satlof	Adam Tyler	March 2, 1990	89106
Don Alejandro is shot by bandits who have stolen the Army payroll, and Diego can only watch helplessly while his father lies in a coma.
14	14	"The Magician"	Michael Vejar	Ted Alben & Greg Klein	March 9, 1990	89110
A magician pays Victoria attention, and Diego questions his intentions.
15	15	"A Deal with the Devil"	Ray Austin	Suzanne Herrera	March 16, 1990	89112
Colonel Palomarez tries to capture Zorro by using a lottery to determine who will be executed unless Zorro surrenders...and Sergeant Mendoza is the first name selected.
16	16	"Whereabouts"	Ron Satlof	Jim Wells	March 23, 1990	89102
An English journalist tries to discover Zorro's real identity, but his plan puts him danger from the Alcalde.
17	17	"All That Glitters"	Peter Diamond	Richard Freiman	March 30, 1990	89105
The Alcalde tries to recover a stolen gem for himself. Valentine Pelka guest stars.
18	18	"Child's Play"	Michael Levine	Marta Vitoria	April 6, 1990	89120
A young landowner bullies his tenants, and a young boy cares for the injured Toronado.
19	19	"A Wolf in Sheep's Clothing"	Michael Vejar	Paul Boorstin & Sharon Boorstin	April 13, 1990	89107
The new priest, with whom Diego has been corresponding, arrives in Los Angeles, but his subsequent actions arouse Diego's suspicions.
20	20	"Ghost Story"	Michael Levine	Paul Boorstin & Sharon Boorstin	April 20, 1990	89114
Sergeant Mendoza inherits a haunted hacienda.
21	21	"The Bounty Hunters"	Michael Vejar	Phillip John Taylor	April 27, 1990	89103
Native Indians are accused of a crime by the bounty hunter who committed it.
22	22	"The Unhappy Medium"	Michael Levine	Bruce Lansbury	May 4, 1990	89116
A fake medium and her accomplice cheat the local cabelleros, but trying to cheat Don Alejandro brings down the wrath of Zorro.
23	23	"An Explosive Situation"	Peter Diamond	Phillip John Taylor	May 11, 1990	89126
The accomplice from "The Unhappy Medium" returns eight months later for revenge.
24	24	"Family Business"	Peter Diamond	Phillip John Taylor	May 18, 1990	89121
A woman claims to be Felipe's mother, but Victoria is suspicious. Diego recalls how he found Felipe. Hunter Tylo stars.
25	25	"Palomarez Returns"	Ray Austin	Robert L. McCullough	May 25, 1990	89117
Colonel Palomarez returns to even the score with Zorro and announces that he now holds a Royal land grant over all the Los Angeles territory.

=== Season 2 (1990–91) ===
No. overall	No. in season	Title	Directed by	Written by	Original release date	Prod. code
26	1	"The Wizard"	Ray Austin	Robert L. McCullough	September 14, 1990	90108
The Alcalde employs an eccentric inventor to capture Zorro. Adam West stars.
27	2	"Master & Pupil"	Ray Austin	Robert L. McCullough	September 21, 1990	90112
Diego's fencing master, Sir Edmund Kendall, arrives from Madrid. Peter Diamond guest stars, who was the stunt co-ordinator/swordmaster for the series.
28	3	"Kidnapped"	Ray Austin	Phillip John Taylor	September 28, 1990	90121
Pirate Captain Henry Stark wants new recruits.
29	4	"The Tease"	Ray Austin	Robert L. McCullough	October 5, 1990	90113
Diego gives Sergeant Mendoza lessons in romance.
30	5	"He Who Lives by the Sword"	Ray Austin	Phillip John Taylor	October 12, 1990	90103
Zorro gives the Alcalde fencing lessons to defeat a swordsman terrorising the pueblo.
31	6	"Freedom of the Press"	Ray Austin	Bruce Lansbury	October 19, 1990	90105
Diego becomes editor of the pueblo newspaper, the Los Angeles Guardian.
32	7	"Sanctuary"	Ray Austin	Tim Minear	October 26, 1990	90120
Bitten by a snake, Zorro has to hide in the barn of the man who is hunting him.
33	8	"The Chase"	Peter Diamond	Michael Marks	November 2, 1990	90104
The Alcalde employs an Indian to track Zorro. Oliver Haden stars.
34	9	"Broken Heart, Broken Mask"	Ray Austin	Eugene Pressman	November 9, 1990	90114
Victoria is shot, and Diego is devastated at the thought of losing her. Roddy Piper stars.
35	10	"The White Sheep of the Family"	Peter Diamond	Phillip John Taylor	November 16, 1990	90101
The Alcalde's twin brother causes trouble for Zorro.
36	11	"The Challenge"	Robert L. McCullough	Robert L. McCullough	November 25, 1990	90107
Bounty hunters hunt a cowboy. Doug McClure stars.
37	12	"Rites of Passage"	Robert L. McCullough	Robert L. McCullough	December 2, 1990	90130
Felipe has to fight for the hand of a Native American girl.
38	13	"The Falcon"	Robert L. McCullough	Andrew Burg & Scott Myers	December 9, 1990	90116
A man calling himself "The Falcon" attempts to overthrow the Alcalde.
39	14	"It's a Wonderful Zorro"	Michael Levine	Phillip John Taylor	December 16, 1990	90126
Diego has a cold and is depressed until the mysterious Don Fernando shows him what Los Angeles would be like if Zorro had never existed.
40	15	"The Marked Man"	Robert L. McCullough	Greg O'Neil	December 23, 1990	90111
Felipe discovers a plot to kill the Alcalde. Pete Postlethwaite and Roger Lloyd-Pack star.
41	16	"Big Brother"	Michael Levine	Phillip John Taylor	January 6, 1991	90122
Diego defends a man accused of robbery. André the Giant stars.
42	17	"To Be a Man"	Ray Austin	Bruce Lansbury	January 13, 1991	90124
A teenager wants to prove his manhood.
43	18	"The Whistling Bandit"	Michael Levine	Tim Minear & Diane Carter	January 25, 1991	90123
A bandit robs the people of Los Angeles while whistling Beethoven's Ninth Symphony.
44	19	"The Don's Dilemma"	Peter Diamond	Adam Tyler	January 27, 1991	90110
Diego's father, Don Alejandro, is appointed temporary Alcalde and tasked with the job of capturing Zorro. Garfield Morgan stars.
45	20	"The Jewelled Sword"	Michael Levine	Bruce Lansbury	February 3, 1991	90134
A midget plots to steal Charlemagne's sword, which is in the custody of the Alcalde. Warwick Davis stars.
46	21	"The Newcomers"	Michael Levine	Robert L. McCullough	February 10, 1991	90128
Zorro helps an Amish family persecuted because of their beliefs.
47	22	"The Devil's Fortress: Part 1"	Ray Austin	Phillip John Taylor	February 24, 1991	90106
Diego searches for Victoria's father while being followed by Sergeant Mendoza, Victoria, her brother Ramon, and the Alcalde. This two-part episode originally aired as one hour-long episode. Note: The episode is told in flashback form by the modern descendants of Zorro.
48	23	"The Devil's Fortress: Part 2"	Ray Austin	Phillip John Taylor	February 24, 1991	90115
Zorro must find a way into the fortress.
49	24	"One for All: Part 1"	Ray Austin	Phillip John Taylor	February 25, 1991	90131
Diego travels to France on vacation. This two-part episode originally aired as one hour-long episode.
50	25	"One for All: Part 2"	Ray Austin	Phillip John Taylor	February 25, 1991	90132
Diego meets the descendants of the Three Musketeers.

=== Season 3 (1991–92) ===
No. overall	No. in season	Title	Directed by	Written by	Original release date	Prod. code
51	1	"The New Broom"	Ray Austin	Phillip John Taylor	September 1, 1991	91101
The new Alcade, Ignacio de Soto, arrives in Los Angeles, but while he's an old acquaintance of Diego's he may be no better than his predecessor.
52	2	"Rush to Judgement"	Ray Austin	Phillip John Taylor	September 8, 1991	91109
Diego and Sergeant Mendoza try to save an innocent man from the gallows.
53	3	"A New Lease on Love"	Ray Austin	Phillip John Taylor	September 15, 1991	91104
The Alcalde has a secret weapon to kill Zorro, while Victoria must make a decision about her future ... and it may not include Zorro.
54	4	"The Man Who Cried Wolf"	Ray Austin	Bruce Lansbury	September 22, 1991	91118
Zorro seeks justice for an innocent settler. Roddy Piper stars.
55	5	"Armed & Dangerous"	Ray Austin	Robert L. McCullough	September 29, 1991	90136
Zorro has to save Victoria, who has been taken captive by a gang of jailbreakers from the Alcalde's very overcrowded jail. Note: Filmed during season 2.
56	6	"The Buccaneers"	Ray Austin	Robert L. McCullough	October 6, 1991	91102
The pirate Big Jim Jarrett and his men arrive in Los Angeles and are arrested by the Alcalde, who is hoping to find their hidden treasure. Jesse Ventura stars.
57	7	"A New Beginning"	Ray Austin	Robert L. McCullough	October 13, 1991	91103
The Alcalde has Jim Jarrett's son kidnapped to force him to reveal the location of the treasure. Jesse Ventura stars.
58	8	"A Woman Scorned"	Ray Austin	Phillip John Taylor	October 20, 1991	91115
Victoria is worried that Zorro has fallen for a woman suspected of murder...a very jealous woman, as it turns out.
59	9	"Wicked, Wicked Zorro"	Ray Austin	Robert L. McCullough	October 27, 1991	91108
Diego is hypnotized and led into a life of crime. Tim Reid stars.
60	10	"Alejandro Rides Again"	Michael Levine	Richard Frieman	November 24, 1991	90125
Diego's father, Don Alejandro, and his old army comrades hunt the man who betrayed their unit and murdered Alejandro's brother thirty years ago. Robert Hoy, Bernard Kay, George Bullock star. Filmed during the second season.
61	11	"The Old Flame"	Robert L. McCullough	Tom Sawyer	December 1, 1991	90119
Diego's former lover arrives in the pueblo, but what dark and dangerous secrets is she hiding? Filmed during the second season.
62	12	"Miracle of the Pueblo"	Ray Austin	Phillip John Taylor	December 8, 1991	91113
An elderly couple arrives with a letter written to Santa Claus by Sergeant Mendoza when he was a boy. The Alcalde throws the old man in jail on a ridiculous charge, and Victoria comes up with various plans to get him out. Patsy Rowlands stars.
63	13	"A Love Remembered"	Ray Austin	Joe Gunn & Gary Stephen Rieck	December 15, 1991	91106
Don Alejandro's old love has returned to the pueblo, with her violent and supposedly dead husband not far behind. Can Zorro return in time to save his father's life? Guest starring Donna Baccala and incorporating footage of Baccala and Henry Darrow from a 1969 episode of The High Chaparral as flashback scenes.
64	14	"Dirty Tricks"	Ray Austin	Phillip John Taylor	January 5, 1992	91111
An election for Alcalde is proposed and Victoria puts herself forward as a candidate, but de Soto is not about to give up his post without a (very dirty) fight.
65	15	"Mendoza the Malevolent"	Ray Austin	Robert L. McCullough	January 12, 1992	91107
Pursuing Zorro, Mendoza is injured and while suffering amnesia is tricked into believing that he is the leader of a band of vicious outlaws.
66	16	"Test of Faith"	Ray Austin	Robert L. McCullough	January 26, 1992	91110
Diego and Don Alejandro rescue and shelter a shipwrecked Japanese sailor whom the Alcalde suspects of being a foreign spy. Soon-Tek Oh stars.
67	17	"Siege"	Peter Diamond	Robert L. McCullough	March 1, 1992	91121
A bandit army led by a madman named Zaragosa surround and lay siege to the pueblo, and Diego-as-Zorro is forced to kill for the first time.
68	18	"They Call Her Annie"	Ray Austin	Robert L. McCullough	March 8, 1992	91116
The new female schoolteacher turns out to be a sharpshooter and bounty hunter who is after the reward for Zorro.
69	19	"Silk Purses and Sow's Ears"	Ray Austin	Robert L. McCullough	March 15, 1992	91112
An emissary from Monterey demands that the Alcalde produce commissioned officers. When the Alcalde maneuvers Sergeant Mendoza into applying for a promotion, Diego tries to teach him the manners of a gentleman.
70	20	"Turning the Tables"	Ray Austin	Tim Minear, Greg Klein & Ted Alben	March 22, 1992	91105
A Spanish emissary who is viciously biased against Indians is given a taste of his own medicine thanks to some special treatment by Diego.
71	21	"One Special Night"	Robert L. McCullough	Gary Steven Rieck	March 29, 1992	90137
Trapped by a storm in an old windmill, Diego and Victoria spend the night together for the first time. Filmed during the second season.
72	22	"Balancing the Books"	Ray Austin	Robert L. McCullough	April 5, 1992	91119
When Sergeant Mendoza wins 5,000 pesos in the Alcalde's lottery, the Alcalde tries to cheat him of his winnings.
73	23	"Blind Man's Bluff"	Peter Diamond	Phillip John Taylor	April 12, 1992	91120
During another chase, Zorro and the Alcalde are temporarily blinded by poisoned water, but de Soto keeps trying to capture Zorro rather than he and Zorro work together to help each other.
74	24	"Heir Apparent"	Ray Austin	Robert L. McCullough	April 19, 1992	90135
Zorro is suspicious of the son of a deceased landowner who arrives to claim his inheritance. Kevin Brophy stars. Filmed during the second season.
75	25	"The Word"	Ray Austin	Robert L. McCullough	April 25, 1992	91117
Felipe witnesses a murder and is pursued by the murderers. Albert Owens stars.

=== Season 4 (1992–93) ===
No. overall	No. in season	Title	Directed by	Written by	Original release date	Prod. code
76	1	"The Fox and the Rabbit"	Ray Austin	Phillip John Taylor & Robert L. McCullough	October 10, 1992	92112
A man calling himself El Conejo poses as a tax collector. Oliver Cotton stars.
77	2	"Ultimate Justice"	Donald Paonessa	Phillip John Taylor & Robert L. McCullough	October 17, 1992	92113
Zorro has to save the Alcalde's life when he strays onto sacred Indian lands.
78	3	"Love Potion Number Nine"	Ray Austin	Phillip John Taylor & Robert L. McCullough	October 24, 1992	92118
Victoria accidentally gives a love potion to the Alcalde meant for Zorro.
79	4	"As Ye Sow"	Ray Austin	Phillip John Taylor, Robert L. McCullough & Maxwell Pitt	October 31, 1992	92125
Two brothers are found dead in mysterious circumstances.
80	5	"An Affair to Remember"	Ray Austin	Gary Stephen Rieck	November 7, 1992	92108
When Victoria is injured, Zorro takes her to his cave. Peter Guinness stars.
81	6	"The Reward"	Ray Austin	Phillip John Taylor & Robert L. McCullough	November 14, 1992	92117
Three men claim a reward for a bandit. Hilton McRae, Patrick Drury star.
82	7	"Like Father, Like Son"	Ray Austin	Tim Minear	December 5, 1992	92106
Don Alejandro suffering from amnesia thinks he is Zorro. Tony Steadman, Gene Collins star.
83	8	"Symbol of Hope"	Ray Austin	Carlton Hollander	December 12, 1992	92107
A dying child's wish inspires the Alcalde to capture Zorro. Thomas Alford, Timothy Bateson star.
84	9	"My Word Is My Bond"	Ray Austin	Phillip John Taylor & Robert L. McCullough	December 19, 1992	92119
Victoria searches for a farmer she helped get released from jail.
85	10	"The Arrival"	Ray Austin	Phillip John Taylor & Robert L. McCullough	January 9, 1993	92101
Gilberto Resendo, a tax collector from Spain, seizes control of Los Angeles. James Horan, Daniel Craig star.
86	11	"Death & Taxes"	Ray Austin	Phillip John Taylor & Robert L. McCullough	January 16, 1993	92122
Resendo seizes church property. James Horan, Daniel Craig, Timothy Bateson star.
87	12	"Conundrum"	Ray Austin	Phillip John Taylor & Robert L. McCullough	January 23, 1993	92123
Tornado is captured and Resendo uses him to trap Zorro. James Horan, Faith Brook, Timothy Bateson star.
88	13	"The Discovery"	Ray Austin	Phillip John Taylor & Robert L. McCullough	January 30, 1993	92124
Resendo takes the ultimate step towards killing Zorro and the de la Vegas. James Horan, Faith Brook star.
