= Smilla's Sense of Snow (TV series) =

2025 TV series

- Genre: Crime drama / thriller
- Based on: Miss Smilla's Feeling for Snow (1992), by Peter Høeg
- Written by: Amma Asante, Clive Bradley
- Screenplay by: Amma Asante, Clive Bradley, Tanya Bubbel, and others
- Directed by: Amma Asante
- Starring: Filippa Coster-Waldau; Henry Lloyd-Hughes; Elyas M'Barek; Amanda Collin; Morten Suurballe; Silver Wolfe
- Theme music composer: Anne Chmelewsky and Egon Riedel
- Country of origin: International co-production
- Original language: English
- No. of series: 1
- No. of episodes: 6

Production
- Executive producers: Amma Asante, Oliver Berben, Robert Kulzer, Martin Moszkowicz
- Producer: Alicia Remirez
- Cinematography: 6 x 60 mins
- Production companies: Constantin Film; Viaplay (Sweden); ARD Degeto (Germany); Baltic Film Services

Original release
- Release: 30 July 2025

Smilla's Sense of Snow is a 2025 six-part European co-produced thriller / crime drama / science fiction TV series based on the 1992 bestselling novel by Danish crime writer Peter Høeg, Miss Smilla's Feeling for Snow. Starring Danish actress Filippa Coster-Waldau, (Note: Daughter of Nikolaj Coster-Waldau.) the series is co-created and directed by British actor and director Amma Asante, and premiered on SBS Television on 30 July 2025.

== Synopsis ==
The series is set amidst political chaos in Copenhagen, owing largely to an energy crisis, in 2040. Bodycams have to be worn by everyone, and drones keep watch over the population. Smilla Jaspersen is a young woman who leads a solitary life, living in a social housing estate, until a chance meeting with a young Greenlandic Inuit boy, Isaiah, who later dies suddenly in suspicious circumstances. Smilla travels to Greenland (where she grew up) to find answers, and finds herself in the middle of political intrigues.

== Cast ==
The cast includes:

- Filippa Coster-Waldau as Smilla Jaspersen, the protagonist
- Silver Wolfe as Isaiah, a young Inuit boy
- Henry Lloyd-Hughes as Karsten Tork, a tech mogul
- Elyas M'Barek as Rahid Youseffi, a Tunisian political refugee, neighbour of Isaiah
- Amanda Collin as Katja Claussen, a government minister
- Morten Suurballe as Moritz Jaspersen, a scientist, Smilla's father
- Alexandre Willaume as Ravn
- Set Sjöstrand as Leif

== Production ==
The series, announced in 2020, is based on the 1992 bestselling novel by Danish crime writer Peter Høeg, Miss Smilla's Feeling for Snow. The series consists of six one-hour episodes. It is directed and co-created by British actor and director Amma Asante, along with British writer Clive Bradley, who co-wrote for the series Trapped. Asante had not read the novel, nor seen the 1997 film of the same name directed by Bille August, but connected with the story and the female protagonist, whom she found to be a strong character and one she could relate to as a woman of colour. Asante lives in Denmark.

The series is an English-language, multinational co-production. It is made by German film production studio Constantin Film in co-production with Viaplay (Sweden), ARD Degeto (Germany), and Baltic Film Services, in cooperation with Netflix DACH (aka Netflix Deutschland, in Germany). It is produced by Alicia Remirez, and director Asante is also a co-executive producer, along with Oliver Berben, Robert Kulzer, and Martin Moszkowicz. The team of writers include Tanja Bubbel, Clive Bradley, Tina Hastings, Rebecca Martin, Julie Nørgaard Jensen, Keith Hodder, Sonya Desai, and Pipaluk K. Jørgensen. Music is by Anne Chmelewsky and Egon Riedel. Colin Scully, Alex Westmore, and Brandon Zimon were appointed to oversee the project in 2020.

Filming of the Copenhagen scenes took place in Vilnius, Lithuania, and then Latvia. Production moved to Finland to follow the snow that was needed in later scenes.

Filippa Navarana Coster-Waldau is a young Danish actress, who in 2022 starred in a leading role in DR's acclaimed 2022 youth series Salsa as well as the lead character Louise in Viaplay's original series Where Were You?. One of her earliest roles was as a teenager in the 2014 short film The Girl and the Dogs, directed by Finnish filmmaker Selma Vilhunen and Guillaume Mainguet, shown at the Cannes Film Festival in 2014. Her parents are Greenlandic singer/actor Nukâka Coster-Waldau, and Danish actor Nikolaj Coster-Waldau.

German actor Elyas M'Barek plays his first lead role in an international production.

== Genre and themes ==
The series has variously been described as "crime drama", "a gripping conspiracy thriller layered with themes of identity, environmentalism, and justice", "dystopian", and with a touch of science fiction.

== Release ==
Smilla's Sense of Snow had its world premiere on SBS Television and its streaming service SBS on Demand in Australia on 30 July 2025.

It is distributed by ITV Studios.

== Reception ==
Craig Mathieson of The Sydney Morning Herald wrote that the series distances itself from the 1997 film of the same name directed by Bille August, taking liberties with the plot of the book. He calls it an "existential thriller" that includes "a smidgeon of science-fiction, a mass of the metaphysical", concluding "This offbeat show's greatest mystery is how unconventional it’s determined to be".
