= Charlie Hanson =

British producer and director

Charlie Hanson is a British producer and director. His work includes the television shows Desmond's, Chef!, The Big Impression, The Sketch Show and Whites, and the 2003 feature film A Way of Life.

== Career ==
Hanson's work as a producer spans more than two decades of television drama and comedy. He produced This Morning with Richard Not Judy, Birds of a Feather, Channel 4's Desmond's, Chef!, starring Lenny Henry, Kelsey Grammer Presents The Sketch Show for Fox Television, both The Harry Hill Show and an episode of Garth Marenghi's Darkplace, Alistair McGowan's The Big Impression, winner of the BAFTA award for Best Comedy Programme in 2003, and The Sketch Show, winner of the BAFTA award for Best Comedy Programme in 2002.

In 2003 Hanson produced his first feature film, Amma Asante's A Way of Life. The film, which had its world premiere at the Toronto Film Festival, was released in the UK in October 2004, garnering 12 international awards, including the Grand Jury Prize for Best Film, and the International Critics' Prize at the Miami International Film Festival in 2005, and four BAFTA Cymru awards.

He produced two series of Extras for BBC/HBO, and in 2008 won a Golden Globe for the Extras Special TV Movie. Most recently he has produced the new Reggie Perrin on BBC1, and Whites for BBC2, starring Alan Davies. He produced the Ricky Gervais and Stephen Merchant movie Cemetery Junction for Sony International, released on 14 April 2010.

In 2011, Hanson produced Gervais and Merchant's Life's Too Short and in 2012, Gervais' Channel 4 comedy-drama pilot Derek. Hanson also worked on the Matt Lucas BBC2 television series Pompidou, which aired in early 2015. From 2019 Hanson went on to produce After Life for Gervais.

=== Sexual assault allegations ===
In May 2021, Hanson was accused by 11 anonymous women - in one letter - of serious sexual assault between 2008 and 2015. His accusers allege that he used "his reputation" to prey on them as young women by "promising them a starry career under his wing". Following the allegations, Hanson was suspended by BAFTA on 30 May 2021, and was removed as producer of After Life.

Hanson was charged with rape and sexual assault in August 2026, attending Westminster Magistrates Court to hear his charges. His trial will begin in February 2028.
