= Clive Bradley (screenwriter) =

British screenwriter

Clive Bradley (born 1959) is a British screenwriter of film and television, who was also notable for being an organiser of the alliance between LGBT people and striking miners in the 1980s. He teaches at the National Film and Television School.

== Career ==
After graduating from the National Film and Television School, he was one of the winners of the first Orange Prize for Screenwriting in 1999. Bradley's first work for television was the episode "Force of Nature" for ITV’s The Vice in 2001, a series for which he contributed two more episodes (2002-2003).

He has worked closely with Touchpaper Television, writing the three-part Last Rights (Channel Four Education 2004), A Harlot's Progress (Channel Four 2006), and the series City of Vice (Channel Four 2007), for which he was the lead writer; he and Peter Harness were nominated for a Writers' Guild of Great Britain award for the series.

That Summer Day (Children’s BBC 2006) won the BAFTA Award for Best Children’s Drama (2007). WΔZ, directed by Tom Shankland, premiered in 2007. He also wrote a two-part episode of the Irish police drama, Single-Handed, in 2010.

In 2016 he won the Writers' Guild of Great Britain Award for "Best Long Form TV Drama" for co-writing the first series of the Icelandic TV series Trapped. (in Icelandic: Ófærð). He also wrote the second series, filmed in 2017.

In June 2021, Bradley was announced as the writer and showrunner of Netflix's Castlevania spin-off, Castlevania: Nocturne, set in 1792 France. In December, it was announced Bradley would be adapting Giles Milton's Winston Churchill's Ministry Of Ungentlemanly Warfare into a ten-episode television drama. In 2025, Bradley created the series Smilla's Sense of Snow. In 2026, he co-wrote the second series of AppleTV's Drops of God, taking over from Quoc Dang Tran.

== Politics ==
Bradley is a socialist and has been involved with the Alliance for Workers' Liberty and its predecessors since the 1980s. He was an active member of Lesbians and Gays Support the Miners during the 1984-5 miners’ strike.
