= Smilla's Sense of Snow (film) =

1997 mystery thriller film

- Theatrical release poster
- Directed by: Bille August
- Screenplay by: Ann Biderman
- Based on: Miss Smilla's Feeling for Snow by Peter Høeg
- Produced by: Bernd Eichinger; Martin Moszkowicz
- Starring: Julia Ormond; Gabriel Byrne; Richard Harris; Robert Loggia; Vanessa Redgrave
- Cinematography: Jörgen Persson
- Edited by: Janus Billeskov Jansen
- Music by: Harry Gregson-Williams; Hans Zimmer
- Production companies: Bavaria Film; Constantin Film; Det Danske Filminstitut; Greenland Film Production; Nordisk Film
- Distributed by: SF Film/Filmcompagniet; All Right Film (Denmark); Constantin Film (Germany); Svensk Filmindustri (Sweden); Summit Entertainment (International)
- Release dates: 13 February 1997 (Germany); 28 February 1997 (Denmark, Sweden)
- Running time: 121 minutes
- Countries: Denmark; Germany; Sweden
- Languages: English; Greenlandic
- Budget: $35 million
- Box office: $23.1 million

Smilla's Sense of Snow is a 1997 mystery thriller film directed by Bille August and starring Julia Ormond, Gabriel Byrne, and Richard Harris. Based on the 1992 novel Miss Smilla's Feeling for Snow (this was also the title of the UK release of the film) by Danish author Peter Høeg, the film is about a transplanted Greenlander, Smilla Jaspersen, who investigates the mysterious death of a small Inuk boy who lived in her housing complex in Copenhagen. Suspecting wrongdoing, Smilla uncovers a trail of clues leading towards a secretive corporation that has made several mysterious expeditions to Greenland.

Scenes from the film were shot in Copenhagen; Kiruna, Sweden; and western Greenland. The film was entered into the 47th Berlin International Film Festival, at which August was nominated for the Golden Bear.

== Plot ==
In 1859, a meteorite streaks across the sky and crashes into the Gela Alta glacier in western Greenland, causing a massive explosion that kills an Inuk fisherman.

In present-day Copenhagen, Smilla Jaspersen, a transplanted Greenlander, is studying ice crystals at a university lab. Although an Arctic ice specialist, Smilla has not completed her credentials and is unemployed, with a troubled past. When she returns to her apartment complex at the end of the day, she finds the body of six-year-old Isaiah Christiansen, a neighbor Inuk boy. He is lying in the snow by the edge of the building. The police say that he must have been playing and fallen from the roof. Smilla knew he was afraid of heights and, on the roof, sees that his footprints show he ran straight to the edge of the roof, as if threatened.

At the morgue Smilla meets with Dr. Lagermann. She is surprised when he tells her that a prominent professor, Dr. Johannes Loyen, performed the autopsy on the boy, who was from a poor working-class family. When she consults with Loyen the next day, he declares the boy's death to be an accident. Unconvinced, Smilla files a complaint with the District Attorney. She goes to Lagermann's home seeking more information, and he says that he found a puncture wound on the boy's thigh, made by a biopsy needle after his death. He also says that Loyen was examining the boy every month.

At the funeral, Smilla notices Dr. Andreas Tork, the CEO of Greenland Mining, offering money to Isaiah's mother, who rejects it angrily. Following her husband's accidental death in Greenland in mining, the company had offered her a pension. Detective Ravn from the District Attorney's office agrees to look into the case, but Smilla discovers he is involved with Tork. Smilla tracks down the company's former accountant, and gains access to a company report about activities in Greenland. A neighbor mechanic becomes involved and offers to help her.

Detective Ravn threatens Smilla with jail for stealing Greenland Mining property. She agrees to suspend her investigation but, after learning from Isaiah's mother that her husband died from something in the mine's melt water, she continues. Smilla asks her father, Moritz Jaspersen, to help her in making sense of the Expedition Report; he agrees to look into it.

At the apartment complex, Smilla searches around Isaiah's former hiding place by a stairwell, and discovers a cassette tape hidden behind the wall. Unable to understand the audio, she takes the tape to a blind audio expert, Licht. Shortly after he tells her that it is Isaiah's father talking to his son, Licht is murdered. Smilla barely escapes with her life and the mechanic picks her up. They follow their pursuers to a ship, which Tork is preparing for another Greenland expedition.

Smilla's father shows her medical x-rays from the report, which reveal that a type of lethal, prehistoric "Arctic worm," long thought to be extinct, apparently was the cause of the "accidental" deaths of mine workers. When the worm entered individual's bodies and attacked organs, it caused toxic shock and death.

Aided by others, Smilla gets aboard the mining ship as an employee. She meets Nils Jakkelsen, who helps her discover videotapes that reveal the mining company had discovered an energy-producing meteorite along with the parasitic worm. Tork believes the meteorite will give his company a dominant position in the industry. There is also a video tape of Prof. Loyen medically examining Isaiah. Smilla is chased throughout the ship by Tork's men, who kill Nils. Smilla is helped again by the mechanic, who tells her he has been working for the government to investigate the company.

As the ship approaches shore, Smilla leaves and makes her way across the frozen landscape. She finds the entrance to the Greenland Mining ice cave, where the company is conducting research on the meteorite. Prof. Loyen is among those present. Tork explains that Isaiah's father was a diver who went into the water around the meteorite and contracted the parasitic worm. Isaiah was also potentially infected as well. Prof. Loyen then monitored Isaiah for a time to see if he was indeed infected. An armed confrontation takes place, but Smilla is rescued by the mechanic and another man. During a struggle, Prof. Loyen falls into the icy pool (containing said meteorite) in the cave, instantly freezing to death (as he sinks below the depths). Tork is wounded and runs out across the ice. Smilla pursues him and recounts what happened with Isaiah. Tork had followed the boy home in hopes of recovering the recording and in the resulting pursuit, Isaiah fled to the roof of his building and fell off the edge. From outside, the mechanic/agent sets off a powerful bomb that destroys the cave and buries all still inside.

The resulting waves cause Tork to fall from the ice and drown in the freezing water. Smilla gazes over the landscape of ice and snow, the land of her childhood.

== Cast ==
- Julia Ormond as Smilla Jaspersen
- Gabriel Byrne as The Mechanic
- Richard Harris as Dr Andreas Tork
- Clipper Miano as Isaiah Christiansen
- Agga Olsen as Juliane Christiansen (Isaiah's mother)
- Jim Broadbent as Dr Lagermann
- Tom Wilkinson as Prof. Loyen
- Robert Loggia as Moritz Jaspersen
- Vanessa Redgrave as Elsa Lübing
- Emma Croft as Benja
- Bob Peck as Ravn
- David Hayman as Telling
- Peter Capaldi as Birgo Lander
- Mario Adorf as Capt. Sigmund Lukas
- Erik Holmey as Hansen
- Matthew Marsh as Detective
- Jürgen Vogel as Nils Jakkelsen
- Alvin Ing as Licht
- Charlotte Bradley as Mrs Lagermann
- Ann Queensberry as Mrs Schou
- Maliinannguaq Markussen-Molgard as Smilla's mother
- Ida Julie Andersen as Smilla as a child
- Ono Fleischer as the Inuk hunter

== Production ==
The film was shot largely in Germany, Denmark, Greenland, and Sweden. Locations include Bavaria Film Studios, Munich, Germany; Copenhagen; Hotel D'Angleterre, Copenhagen; Ilulissat, Greenland; Kiruna and Norrbottens län, Sweden; and Ata, Greenland.

== Reception ==
=== Critical response ===
Smilla's Sense of Snow received mixed reviews, with most of the negative reviews focused on the unrealistic ending. In her review in The New York Times, Janet Maslin wrote, "Smilla's Sense of Snow begins grippingly, then devolves into ever less credible derring-do as the action turns Smilla from a self-styled detective into an adventurer. The story finally leaves credibility behind as it sails off to the frozen north. The film has an elegant Smilla in Julia Ormond, whose remoteness works better here than it has in other roles. Ms. Ormond plays Smilla in the chic, alert, unsmiling fashion of a French film star, and she richly rewards the camera's many beautiful close-ups of Smilla cogitating on crime."

In his review in the Chicago Sun-Times, Roger Ebert gave the film three stars. Despite the implausible ending, he found that the movie worked, writing, "Here is a movie so absorbing, so atmospheric, so suspenseful and so dumb, that it proves my point: The subject matter doesn't matter in a movie nearly as much as mood, tone and style. Smilla's Sense of Snow is a superbly made film with one of the goofiest plots in many moons. Nothing in the final 30 minutes can possibly be taken seriously, and yet the movie works. Even the ending works, sort of, because the film has built up so much momentum."

In her review in the Las Vegas Review-Journal, Carol Cling wrote, "Fascinating setting and strong performances make up for the far-fetched plotting." In his review in the Flipside Movie Emporium, Rob Vaux wrote, "An underrated and effective thriller, buoyed by a fine performance from Julia Ormond." In his review in the Capital Times (Madison, WI), Rob Thomas wrote, "An atmospheric and enjoyably preposterous mystery." And in her review in Movie Mom at Yahoo! Movies, Nell Minow wrote, "The idiotic ending seems to belong to another movie."

On Rotten Tomatoes the film received a 53% positive rating based on 32 reviews. On Metacritic, the film received "mixed or average" reviews, scoring 48% which was based on 18 reviews.

=== Box office ===
The film opened on 251 screens in Germany and grossed 2.9 million Deutsche Mark ($1.8 million) over the 4-day weekend, placing fifth at the German box office. It went on to gross $23.1 million worldwide.

=== Awards and nominations ===
- 1997 Berlin International Film Festival - Golden Berlin Bear Nomination (Bille August)

== See also ==
- Smilla's Sense of Snow, a 2025 TV series
