= Castlevania: Nocturne =

2023 Netflix animated series based on Castlevania

- Release poster for Season 1
- Created by: Clive Bradley
- Based on: Castlevania: Rondo of Blood by Konami
- Written by: Clive Bradley; Zodwa Nyoni; Temi Oh; Testament
- Directed by: Sam Deats; Adam Deats
- Voices of: Edward Bluemel; Thuso Mbedu; Pixie Davies; Richard Dormer; Sydney James Harcourt; Nastassja Kinski; Zahn McClarnon; Aaron Neil; Sophie Skelton; Elarica Johnson; Franka Potente; Sharon D. Clarke; Iain Glen; James Callis
- Composers: Trevor Morris; Trey Toy
- Country of origin: United States
- Original language: English
- No. of seasons: 2
- No. of episodes: 16

Production
- Executive producers: Clive Bradley; Kevin Kolde; Fred Seibert; Adi Shankar; Adam Deats; Sam Deats
- Running time: 25–33 minutes
- Production companies: Powerhouse Animation Studios; Project 51 Productions

Original release
- Network: Netflix
- Release: September 28, 2023 – January 16, 2025

Related
- Castlevania

Castlevania: Nocturne is an American adult animated dark fantasy action television series created and written by Clive Bradley for Netflix. A sequel to the Castlevania animated series (2017–2021), it is based on the video game series of the same name by Konami and adapted from the game Castlevania: Rondo of Blood (1993). The series focuses on Richter Belmont, a descendant of previous protagonists Trevor and Sypha, and is set during the French Revolution. It was produced by Powerhouse Animation Studios and Project 51 Productions with animation services provided by DR Movie.

Castlevania: Nocturne premiered on Netflix on September 28, 2023. In October 2023, the series was renewed for a second season that premiered on January 16, 2025. It received favourable reviews from critics, who saw it as a worthy return to the world of its predecessor.

== Premise ==
Set in 1792 during the French Revolution, primarily in the French commune of Machecoul, the series follows the young Vampire hunter Richter Belmont and his adoptive sister Maria Renard as they make new allies and attempt to prevent the apocalyptic rise of a god-like Vampire Messiah.

== Voice cast and characters ==
- Edward Bluemel as Richter Belmont, a descendant of Trevor Belmont and Sypha Belnades and the current wielder of the legendary "Vampire Killer" whip. His Speaker powers inherited from Sypha are mentally blocked by his childhood trauma.
  - Benjamin Plessala voices Richter Belmont as a child.
- Thuso Mbedu as Annette, a former slave from the French Caribbean with the ability to perform the Vodou magic of an African earth god.
- Pixie Davies as Maria Renard, a young aristocrat-turned-revolutionary during the French Revolution, Richter's adoptive sister, and a Speaker who can summon animal spirits to aid her.
- Richard Dormer as Emmanuel / The Abbot, a clergyman of the Order of Saint John and a Devil Forgemaster who works to maintain the Church's power.
- Sydney James Harcourt as Edouard, an opera singer and Annette's closest friend, who aided her in a slave uprising before journeying together to France.
- Nastassja Kinski as Tera Renard, a Speaker magician, Maria's mother, and Richter's adoptive mother.
- Zahn McClarnon as Olrox, an ancient Aztec vampire from the New World and an adversary of the Belmont clan. He travels to France to witness the rise of the "Vampire Messiah".
- Aaron Neil as Mizrak, a knight serving under the Abbot with an unshakable faith in God, and Olrox's lover.
- Sophie Skelton as Julia Belmont (season 1), a skilled vampire huntress and Richter's mother.
- Elarica Johnson as Drolta Tzuentes, an ancient vampire and a devoted follower of the Egyptian goddess Sekhmet who prepares the vampire aristocracy for Erzsebet's arrival.
- Franka Potente as Erzsebet Báthory, the self-declared "Vampire Messiah" who is drawn to France by the ongoing revolution and claims to be the reincarnation of Sekhmet.
- Sharon D. Clarke as Cécile Fatiman, a resistance leader and mambo from the French Caribbean and Annette's spiritual mentor.
- Iain Glen as Juste Belmont, Julia's father, Richter's grandfather, and a former vampire hunter once famously gifted in magic.
- James Callis as Adrian "Alucard" Țepeș, the dhampir son of Dracula and Lisa Țepeș, who previously fought alongside Trevor Belmont and Sypha Belnades three centuries prior. Callis reprises his role from Castlevania and is credited as "Special Guest Star" for all appearances.

== Episodes ==
Season	Episodes	Originally released
1	8	September 28, 2023
2	8	January 16, 2025

=== Season 1 (2023) ===
No. overall	No. in season	Title	Directed by	Written by	Original release date
1	1	"A Common Enemy in Evil"	Sam Deats and Adam Deats	Clive Bradley	September 28, 2023
As a child in Boston in 1783, 10-year-old Richter Belmont witnesses his mother, Julia, killed at the hands of powerful Aztec vampire Olrox, who spares his life. He flees to France, where he is raised by Speaker magician Tera Renard alongside her daughter, Maria. In 1792, during the French Revolution, Maria rallies the rebellion against the aristocratic bourgeoisie, many of whom are vampires, while Richter continues the vampire hunting legacy of his Belmont bloodline, though he is unable to use his Belnades bloodline's magic. They hear the vampires speak of an ominous vampire messiah and report this to the church's Abbott Emmanuel. Encountering Night Creatures, demonic beings created by a Forgemaster, they are rescued by the arrival of Caribbean sorceress and former slave, Annette, and free mixed-race opera singer, Edouard, who are seeking Richter based on a vision from a seer, warning of the vampire messiah. Meanwhile, Olrox arrives in France.
2	2	"Horror Beyond Nightmares"	Sam Deats and Saren Stone	Clive Bradley	September 28, 2023
Drolta Tzuentes arrives as an emissary of the vampire messiah, Erzsebet Báthory, to secure the alliance between the vampires and Abbott Emmanuel, revealed to be the Forgemaster. Emmanuel fears the revolution and seeks to crush it by allying with the vampire's forces. Upon hearing of Erzsebet from Annette and Edouard, Tera reveals that she fled Erzsebet in Russia in her youth after failing to rescue her younger sister from her. The four youths make a plan to attack the vampire aristocrats at their palace, but lose the element of surprise when Annette sees Vaublanc, the vampire who enslaved her and her mother, among the partygoers. They find themselves overwhelmed and flee, but Edouard is killed. His body is then used to create a new Night Creature.
3	3	"Freedom Was Sweeter"	Sam Deats and Tam Lu	Zodwa Nyoni	September 28, 2023
Annette grieves for Edouard and recalls her past under Vaublanc's cruelty, his murder of her mother, and the awakening of her magical powers, whereupon she fled and found refuge with Edouard. Together with other freedom fighters, led by seer Cécile Fatiman, they lead a slave rebellion in Saint-Domingue, until Cécile has a vision and sends them to France to seek Richter. Olrox arrives at the church, but is intercepted by Emmanuel's right-hand man, knight Mizrak. He warns Mizrak that Erzsebet will turn on their alliance eventually. Maria introduces Annette to the other revolutionaries to inspire them, but their meeting is set upon by Night Creatures, including the one made from Edouard. However, when Annette is endangered, it kills its fellow Night Creatures to save her and is brought back to the church.
4	4	"Horrors Rising from the Earth"	Sam Deats and Adam Deats	Clive Bradley	September 28, 2023
The group strategizes in the wake of the possibility that Emmanuel and the church are in league with the vampires. With Tera's guidance, they infiltrate the church's catacombs. Drolta tours Emmanuel's Forgemaster chambers as they discuss the terms of their alliance, while Olrox secretly observes them. Emmanuel has built a machine to create Night Creatures to aid Erzsebet, and hopes Erzsebet will embrace her role of messiah to quash the revolution. Emmanuel locks Edouard in the catacombs for his disobedience. The group encounters Emmanuel and Drolta, and Tera is shocked, given Emmanuel's previously kind nature. A fight ensues, as Annette locates Edouard and realizes he remembers who he is. Olrox reveals himself, causing Richter to lose his nerve and flee, and the others retreat, Annette vowing to return for Edouard.
5	5	"The Natural Order"	Sam Deats and Adam Deats	Temi Oh	September 28, 2023
Drolta persuades Olrox to ally with Erzsebet, and explains that Erzsebet now has the godly ability to block out the sun, allowing vampires to rule the earth. Enraged at Richter's cowardice, Annette tracks down Vaublanc and interrogates him before killing him, learning that Erzsebet drank the blood of Sekhmet. Emmanuel visits Tera and Maria, and admits his role as Forgemaster and an ally of Erzsebet, out of fear for preserving the church and Christianity against the larger threat of the violent atheism of the revolutionaries. In a heated exchange with Tera, Emmanuel reveals himself to be Maria's father, shocking and angering Maria. Richter, having fled, encounters an old man, who reveals himself to be Juste Belmont, Richter's grandfather.
6	6	"Guilty Men to Be Judged"	Sam Deats and Adam Deats	Clive Bradley	September 28, 2023
Erzsebet arrives and is celebrated by the vampire public as their messiah. Edouard communicates to the other Night Creatures, who slowly begin to remember their former human lives as well. Juste describes to Richter how he fell from grace, and the two bond over memories of Julia, but are beset by minions sent by Drolta. The battle awakens Richter's fearsome dormant magical powers. Olrox tells Mizrak his history of experiencing colonization by the conquistadors, and his one true love, a Mohican man, who he turned into a vampire, only for him to be killed by Julia. Annette communes with Cécile, who encourages her to forgive Richter and to find power in herself and her ancestors. Drolta discovers that Maria is Emmanuel's daughter.
7	7	"Blood Is the Only Way"	Sam Deats and Adam Deats	Testament	September 28, 2023
Erzsebet and her followers celebrate as she elaborates on her plans to conquer Europe and—with Olrox's begrudging assistance—the Americas. Drolta traps Emmanuel by revealing his relationship to Maria to Erzsebet to force him to prove his loyalty. Richter returns and apologizes to Annette, vowing to help her rescue Edouard. They plan an attack on the church, and are interrupted when Olrox appears, bringing with him Emmanuel's infernal tome that he uses to create Night Creatures in his machine. He asks them to destroy the machine, as only humans may do so, in order to stop Erzsebet's plans, though Richter is distrustful of him. Maria sneaks into the church to warn Emmanuel to flee beforehand. He instead has her captured to be sacrificed to Erzsebet to prove himself. Tera studies the tome and realizes that the machine cannot be destroyed, but can be sent back to Hell. Mizrak, disgusted by Emmanuel's actions, informs the group that Maria's life is in danger. They race to the church as Erzsebet uses her powers to cause a solar eclipse, plunging the city into darkness.
8	8	"Devourer of Light"	Sam Deats and Adam Deats	Clive Bradley	September 28, 2023
Erzsebet incarnates as Sekhmet. Emmanuel attempts to sacrifice Maria, but Tera and the others stop him. Drolta and her minions arrive and Richter, Maria, Mizrak, and Olrox hold them at bay as Tera reads the incantation to send the infernal machine back to Hell, while Annette locates Edouard. Edouard tells her to leave him, as he believes he can reawaken the other Night Creatures. Annette journeys below to push the machine into the portal, but the incantation is interrupted upon Erzsebet's arrival. Erzsebet easily defeats them all, and seeks to turn Maria into a vampire. Olrox expresses his love for Mizrak, and urges that they abandon the others, but Mizrak refuses. Olrox leaves alone. Tera offers herself to Erzsebet instead, and she accepts, recognizing the value of Tera's Speaker powers on her side. Tera begs Richter to flee with her daughter. Emmanuel realizes that Tera's sacrifice will not spare Maria or the others from Erzsebet's forces, but is helpless. To his horror, Tera becomes Erzsebet's vampire servant. Richter, Annette, Maria, and Mizrak flee, but are chased down by Drolta. However, Drolta is suddenly killed by the newly arrived Alucard, the son of Dracula.

=== Season 2 (2025) ===
No. overall	No. in season	Title	Directed by	Written by	Original release date
9	1	"A Living Legend"	Sam Deats and Adam Deats	Clive Bradley	January 16, 2025
Three years ago, Alucard travels to Egypt, searching for Sekhmet's sarcophagus, only to find her mummy missing. In the present day, Erzsebet's solar eclipse ends due to her powers getting weaker. Alucard explains to the group that Sekhmet's soul is divided between her blood, her heart, and physical body, and that he had located Sekhmet's mummy in Paris, asking Richter to help him find it. Still mourning her mother's sacrifice, Maria refuses to come in Paris with them, with Mizrak staying behind to keep a guard on her. Maria goes to meet with the National Guard, who are sent to liberate Machecoul from Erzsebet's control. Olrox tells Tera that being a vampire doesn't change her character, and she abandons Erzsebet. Not willing to accept Drolta's death, Erzsebet calls Emmanuel and threatens him into resurrecting Drolta with his machine as a night creature.
10	2	"Angel of Death"	Sam Deats and Adam Deats	Testament	January 16, 2025
In 1199 CE Egypt, Drolta witnesses her fellow priestesses getting slaughtered by a group of vampires. After a brief scuffle with a vampire, Drolta ends up killing it and drinking its blood, transforming herself into one. In the present day, Richter, Annette, and Alucard find Juste to inform him of recent events, and Richter asks him to help Maria. On their way to Paris, Richter and Annette are ambushed by vampires who learn about their plan after Richter carelessly tells them. Meanwhile, Maria returns home to get supplies and finds Tera, who reaffirms her motherly love for Maria, although she is frightened by her mother's vampiric state. Mizrak intervenes, forcing Tera to leave. The National Guard arrives in Machecoul, but the citizens, now worshiping Erzsebet, drive them out. Drolta arrives and uses her new abilities to slaughter them, while Olrox stops Mizrak from helping them, worried about his life.
11	3	"The Widow's Window"	Sam Deats and Adam Deats	Temi Oh	January 16, 2025
All the slaughtered soldiers are turned into Night Creatures by Emmanuel, while Edouard befriends the female captain of the National Guard after her transformation into a Night Creature. While trying to save civilians from Erzsebet's vampires, Richter confesses to Alucard that he accidentally exposed their plan to one of her followers. Reaching out to Maria once again, Tera teaches Maria how to use dark magic before being interrupted by Juste. After a brief duel, they notice Maria, disgusted by her father's horrible actions, heading to the abbey to kill Emmanuel. In Paris, the trio witnesses the execution of Louis XVI, while Annette senses multiple spirits surrounding her.
12	4	"Monstrous Things"	Sam Deats and Adam Deats	Clive Bradley	January 16, 2025
In 1614 Hungary, Drolta meets with a young Erzsebet, who has been imprisoned for the murders of young children. Believing Erzsebet as the perfect vessel for Sekhmet, Drolta swears allegiance to her and promises to make her into a goddess. In the present, the trio finds Sekhmet's mummy in the Louvre Palace, only for Drolta to arrive and steal the mummy. Annette becomes frustrated by her inability to understand what the spirits are trying to tell her. Maria furiously confronts Emmanuel, accusing him for Tera's fate and using her newfound dark magic to summon a dragon, which burns him alive. After the dragon becomes uncontrollable, Juste's magic reawakens and he uses it to save Maria from the dragon. He warns Tera that Maria shouldn't use dark magic or it will destroy her. Emmanuel's remains are taken by a mysterious shadowy figure.
13	5	"Into the Abyss"	Sam Deats and Adam Deats	Clive Bradley	January 16, 2025
Blaming Richter's carelessness for the loss of Sekhmet's mummy, Alucard goes alone to the National Convention to warn them about Erzsebet. Mizrak tries to persuade Olrox to fight against Erzsebet, but he refuses and decides to return to America. Consumed by her anger and the influence by her dark magic, Maria asks her mother to turn her into a vampire, but Juste convinces Maria not to surrender to the darkness. Realizing how her presence has been corrupting Maria, Tera leaves a tearful Maria in order to find herself and asks Juste to take care of her. Believing that Sekhmet's third soul might exist in the spirit world, Annette realizes that the spirits can help her reach Sekhmet's soul.
14	6	"Ancestors"	Sam Deats and Adam Deats	Zodwa Nyoni	January 16, 2025
In Machecoul, Juste helps Maria regain her light magic. In Paris, all the citizens are preparing themselves for Erzsebet's invasion. Annette enters the spirit world, where she is reunited with Cecile and her mother, who advise her to visit Ogun. He equips Annette with a shield and helps her find Sekhmet. Alucard apologizes to Richter about his outburst, and encourages him to tell Annette that he loves her. Sekhmet possesses Annette's body, while she duels Ammit in the Duat. Erzsebet devours Sekhmet's heart and brings forth a stronger solar eclipse.
15	7	"Grenadye Alaso"	Sam Deats and Adam Deats	Clive Bradley	January 16, 2025
Erzsebet's army of vampires and Night Creatures attack Paris. Alucard and Robespierre lead the army against Erzsebet's forces, while Edouard and the captain rally some of the Night Creatures to turn against Erzsebet's followers. Sekhmet possessing Annette tries to absorb her other two souls out of Erzsebet, but she is too weak to do so, while Annette struggles in her fight against Ammit in the spirit world. Richter, Maria, Juste, and Mizrak work together to fight Erzsebet. Olrox also joins the fight and helps Alucard duel Drolta. During the battle, Mizrak is gravely injured, causing Olrox to leave his fight with Drolta to take Mizrak from the battlefield. With Erzsebet defeated, Sekhmet's third soul tries to absorb the other two, but Erzsebet is betrayed and taken away by Drolta. Deeming Erzsebet unworthy to be Sekhmet, Drolta absorbs Sekhmet's two souls, killing Erzsebet.
16	8	"A Line of Great Heroes"	Sam Deats and Adam Deats	Clive Bradley	January 16, 2025
Drolta overpowers Alucard and Richter, but Sekhmet in Annette's body absorbs her souls out of Drolta's body. With the help of Olrox and Alucard, Ritcher defeats and kills Drolta for good. Before Olrox leaves, Richter vows that he will kill Olrox one day for what he did to his mother. As all three of Sekhmet's souls are reunited, Annette returns from the spirit world and Richter confesses his love to her. With the eclipse ending, Maria, Juste, and Alucard stay in Paris to help rebuild and continue the fight for freedom, while Richter, Annette, and Edouard sail back to Saint-Domingue. However, unbeknownst to Maria, Tera is watching Maria from afar with the mysterious shadowy figure appearing behind her. Meanwhile, Olrox saves a dying Mizrak by turning him into a vampire.

== Production ==
On April 16, 2022, Deadline reported that Netflix was planning a spin-off series set in the Castlevania universe, following the conclusion of its original animated series, with a new cast of characters. Kevin Kolde and Clive Bradley were announced as the showrunners and executive producers under Kolde's Project 51 Productions banner. Powerhouse Animation was also announced to return as the primary production studio while Sam and Adam Deats would direct episodes from the first season. Animation services were outsourced to South Korean studio DR Movie. Adi Shankar was not included in production on the series, with Shankar claiming he was excluded and suing for breach of contract.

On June 10, 2022, during Netflix's Geeked Week virtual event, it was announced that the series is titled Castlevania: Nocturne. The voice cast of the series was revealed on July 27, 2023.

On October 6, 2023, one week after the release of the first season, Netflix renewed the series for a second season.

== Release ==
Castlevania: Nocturne premiered on Netflix on September 28, 2023. The first three episodes were screened a day early during the Netflix virtual showcase "DROP 01".

The second season premiered on January 16, 2025.

== Reception ==
Critical response of Castlevania: Nocturne
Season	Rotten Tomatoes	Metacritic
1	96% (25 reviews)	77 (9 reviews)
2	100% (17 reviews)	—N/a

=== Season 1 ===
On the review aggregator website Rotten Tomatoes, the first season of Castlevania: Nocturne holds an approval rating of 96%, based on 25 reviews with an average score of 8.0/10. The website's critics consensus reads, "Bringing great flair to a struggle against demons both literal and metaphorical, Nocturne is a promising return to the world of Castlevania." Metacritic, which uses a weighted average, assigned a score of 77 out of 100 based on seven critic reviews, indicating "generally favorable reviews".

The series was nominated for "Best Adaptation" at The Game Awards 2023.

=== Season 2 ===
On the review aggregator website Rotten Tomatoes, the second season of Castlevania: Nocturne holds an approval rating of 100%, based on 17 reviews with an average score of 8.6/10. The website's critics consensus reads, "A near perfect continuation of the original series Castlevania concludes its Parisian chapter with even more dazzling visuals, bleeding hearts, epic tragedy, and a satisfactory end to Nocturne Season 2."
