= Borderliners =

Novel by Peter Høeg

Borderliners is the English translation of De måske egnede, a novel written by Danish author Peter Høeg in 1993. It is about three children – Peter, Katarina, and August – who attend a private school in Copenhagen in the mid-1970s. It is not long before the children realise they are part of an experiment initiated by the school. The objective is to show how damaged children can be saved and made into citizens. The children choose to fight the experiment.

== Description ==
Peter is a student at Biehl's after spending all of his life in children's homes and reform schools. He is a "borderline case", along with Katarina, whose parents both died in the past year, and August, who is severely disturbed after killing his abusive parents. Although allowed no social interaction, the children conspire to conduct their own experiment to discover what plan is being carried out at Biehl's. Høeg touches on some of the same themes as in his acclaimed Miss Smilla's Feeling for Snow – neglected children, scientific experiments, and technology. Borderliners is not a thriller. It explores the themes of social control, child assessment, family, and the concept of time.

== See also ==
- Jakob Johann von Uexküll
- The Promised Neverland
