= Morten Suurballe =

Danish actor

Morten Sasse Suurballe
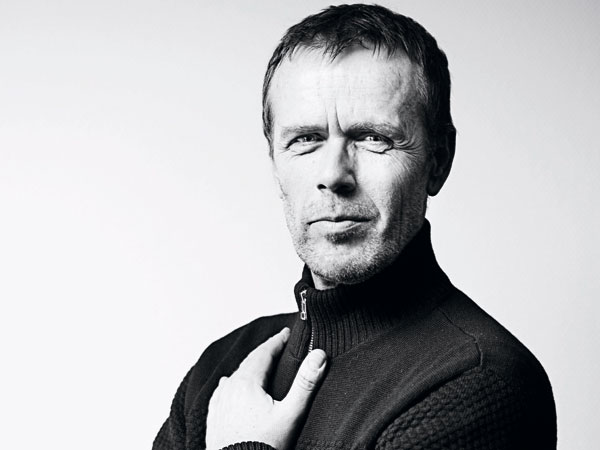
- Born: Copenhagen, Denmark
- Occupation: Actor
- Years active: 1978 - present
- Known for: The Killing

Morten Sasse Suurballe is a Danish actor, best known for playing Detective Chief Inspector Lennart Brix in the three television series The Killing (Danish: Forbrydelsen) in which he played alongside Sofie Gråbøl.

== Early life and education ==
Morten Sasse Suurballe was born in Copenhagen and educated at the Danish National School of Theatre in 1978.

== Career ==
Suurballe was employed at several theatres, including the Royal Danish Theatre.

He played Detective Chief Inspector Lennart Brix in the three television series The Killing (Danish: Forbrydelsen), alongside Sofie Gråbøl.

In 2025 he appears as Moritz, a scientist, in the crime drama television series Smilla's Sense of Snow, an international co-production created and directed by British director Amma Asante.

== Awards and honours ==
In January 2013 Suurballe was awarded Knight of 1st Class of Order of the Dannebrog.

== Filmography ==
=== Films ===
- Kniven i hjertet (1981)
- Flamberede hjerter (1986)
- Et skud fra hjertet (1986)
- Opbrud (1988)
- Drengene fra Sankt Petri (1991)
- En dag i oktober (1991)
- Frække Frida og de frygtløse spioner (1994)
- Menneskedyret (1995)
- Carmen og Babyface (1995)
- Mimi og madammerne (1998)
- Manden som ikke ville dø (1999)
- Slip hestene løs (2000)
- Voksne mennesker (2005)
- Bag det stille ydre (2005)
- Rene hjerter (2006)
- Cecilie (2007)
- Guldhornene (movie)|Guldhornene (2007)
- Skyscraper (2011)
- Skybound (2017)

=== Television ===
- Kirsebærhaven 89 (1989)
- Gøngehøvdingen (1991-1992)
- Kald mig Liva (1992)
- Flemming og Berit (1994)
- Den hemmelige tunnel (1997)
- Rejseholdet (2000-2003)
- Ørnen (2004)
- Jul i Valhal (2005) Thrym (Jul i Valhal)
- Forbrydelsen (2007)
- Album (2008)
- Forbrydelsen II (2009)
- Anstalten [2011]
- Broen (2011)
- Forbrydelsen III (2012)
- Vikings (2014)
- X Company (2015-2017)
- Acceptable Risk (2017)
- Smilla's Sense of Snow (2025)
