= Miss Smilla's Feeling for Snow =

1992 novel by Peter Høeg

- UK hardback first edition
- Author: Peter Høeg
- Original title: Frøken Smillas fornemmelse for sne
- Translator: Tiina Nunnally
- Language: Danish
- Genre: Murder mystery
- Publisher: Rosinante
- Publication date: 1992
- Publication place: Denmark
- English publication date: 1993 (Harvill Press, UK)
- Media type: Hardback
- Pages: 435
- ISBN: 978-8716149626

Miss Smilla's Feeling for Snow (Danish: Frøken Smillas fornemmelse for sne), published in America as Smilla's Sense of Snow, is a 1992 novel by Danish author Peter Høeg tracing the investigation into the suspicious death of a Greenlandic boy in Denmark. A global bestseller, it was translated into English by Tiina Nunnally (credited as "F. David" in the British edition).

== Title ==
During her Greenland childhood, Smilla developed an almost intuitive understanding of all types of snow and their characteristics. As an adult, she worked for a time as a scientist whose speciality was snow and ice. Her certainty about the manner of a child’s death is due to this visceral "feeling for snow".

== Background ==
The novel is ostensibly a work of detection and a thriller, although beneath the surface of the novel, Høeg is concerned with rather deeper cultural issues, particularly Denmark's problematic post-colonial history, and also the nature of relationships that exist between individuals and the societies in which they are obliged to operate. The protagonist Smilla Qaaviqaaq Jaspersen is a sympathetic and useful vehicle in this respect, her deceased mother being a Greenlandic Inuk and her father a rich Danish doctor.

Having been brought in childhood from the poverty and freedom of Greenland to the affluent and highly ordered society of Denmark, Smilla's relationship with Denmark and Danish society is strained and ambivalent. Smilla investigates the death of a neighbour’s child whom she had befriended—a fellow Greenlander, with an alcoholic, neglectful mother and a mysteriously deceased father. The story begins in Copenhagen, where the child has fallen to his death from the snowy rooftop of his own apartment building. The police refuse to consider it anything but an accident—there is only one set of footprints (the child's) in the snow leading to the edge of the roof—but Smilla believes there is something about the footprints that shows that the boy was chased off the roof. Her investigations lead her to decades-old conspiracies in Copenhagen, and then to a voyage on an icebreaker ship to a remote island off the Greenlandic coast, where the truth is finally discovered. But the book ends unresolved, with no firm conclusion.

== Plot ==
Smilla Qaaviqaaq Jaspersen, 37-year-old product of the stormy union of a female Inuk hunter and a rich urban Danish physician, is a loner who struggles to live with her fractured heritage. Living alone in a dreary apartment complex in Christianshavn, Copenhagen, she befriends Isaiah, the neglected son of her alcoholic neighbour, because he too is Greenlandic and not truly at home in Denmark. Smilla's friendship with Isaiah, recounted in the novel in flashback, gives some meaning to her otherwise lonely life. Isaiah’s sudden death is explained officially as a fall from the roof whilst playing, but Smilla’s understanding of the tracks the child left on the snowy roof convinces her that this is untrue. She complains to the police and quickly encounters obstruction and hostility from the authorities and other sources.

Working with Peter, a mechanic neighbour who had also known and liked Isaiah, and with whom she begins an affair despite her fear of dependency, Smilla discovers that there is a conspiracy centred on Gela Alta, an isolated glaciated island off Greenland. Previous expeditions have found something there (Isaiah’s father was a diver who died on one of them, allegedly in an accident) and now plans are afoot to return for it. Isaiah’s death is linked to this conspiracy in some way. After a long journey of discovery in Copenhagen, during which she learns that the mechanic is not who he says he is, Smilla braves intimidation and threats and eventually gets on board the ship chartered for the mysterious expedition to Gela Alta, ostensibly as a stewardess.

The final action takes place on the ship and the island. Smilla is held in deep suspicion by the ship's crew—who turn out to be all in some way compromised and in the pay of the mysterious Tørk Hviid, who is the expedition's real leader. Despite repeated attempts on her life by crew members, who assume she is from the authorities, Smilla doggedly pursues the truth, even when she discovers that Peter has deceived and betrayed her. The secret of the island is revealed to be a meteorite embedded in the glacier, certainly uniquely valuable—perhaps even alive in some way. However, the water surrounding it is infested with a lethal parasite related to the Guinea worm, which is what really killed Isaiah’s father. Isaiah was forced off the roof because he had accompanied his father on the previous expedition and had evidence of the meteorite’s location—and the parasite itself was actually dormant in his body. When Smilla learns that Tørk Hviid had chased Isaiah off the roof to his death, she pursues him out onto the frozen sea. He tries to reach the ship and force it to sail away, but Smilla chases him, using her intuitive ice-sense to head him off, out into isolation and danger. Here the novel ends.

== Reception ==
The New York Times called the novel a "publishing sensation" that "was America's gateway drug to a long-term dependency on Nordic noir." It was named the 1993 Best Book of the Year by both Time and Entertainment Weekly and spent twenty-six weeks on the New York Times best-seller list. The novel was translated into seventeen languages, and published in over thirty countries.

As a genre novel, the book won the Crime Writers' Association Silver Dagger Award for Fiction in 1994, and was shortlisted for an Edgar Award from the Mystery Writers of America in 1994. It also won the 1994 Dilys Award, chosen by the Independent Mystery Booksellers Association as the mystery title of the year that member booksellers most enjoyed selling.

Literary critics have since considered its cultural themes, such as viewing it as a response to the "greed is good" spirit of the 1980s that pervaded Denmark and other western countries, showing "Danish society in terms of its limitations and injustices, particularly in relation to its treatment of Greenland and Greenlanders." Or as a nation coming to grips with its colonial past, showing "a number of puzzles that a colonial, and later a capitalist, hegemony and subordination" set up.

== Awards and nominations ==
- Winner of the Crime Writers' Association Silver Dagger Award in 1994
- Winner of the Dilys Award for 1994 by the Independent Mystery Booksellers Association
- Shortlisted for an Edgar Award in 1994

== Adaptations ==
=== Film adaptation ===
The film, Smilla's Sense of Snow starring Julia Ormond, Jim Broadbent, Gabriel Byrne, Richard Harris, Jürgen Vogel, Mario Adorf, and Tom Wilkinson, directed by Bille August was released in 1997. There were some changes to the plot, especially having a more conclusive end in which the villain Tørk Hviid gets killed, instead of the book's deliberately ambiguous ending. In the United Kingdom it was released as Miss Smilla's Feeling for Snow.

=== TV series ===
Smilla's Sense of Snow is a 2025 six-part series directed by British actor and director Amma Asante. It had its premiere on SBS Television in Australia on 30 July 2025.

== See also ==
- ALH84001 – a meteorite which shows structures that some scientists think could be fossilised bacteria-like life forms when observed through an electron microscope.
- Greenlandic people in Denmark
- Scandinavian noir
