= Zorro (1990 TV series) =

- Genre: Action/adventure; Drama; Superhero; Western
- Starring: Duncan Regehr; Patrice Martinez; Juan Diego Botto; James Victor; Michael Tylo; J. G. Hertzler; Efrem Zimbalist Jr.; Henry Darrow
- Country of origin: United States
- Original language: English
- No. of seasons: 4
- No. of episodes: 88 (list of episodes)

Production
- Production companies: Goodman/Rosen Productions; Ellipse Programme; Zorro Productions, inc.; New World Television

Original release
- Network: The Family Channel
- Release: January 5, 1990 – January 30, 1993

Zorro (also known as The New Zorro, New World Zorro, and Zorro 1990) is an American Western superhero television series featuring Duncan Regehr as the character of Zorro. Regehr portrayed the fearless Spanish hero and fencer on The Family Channel from 1990 to 1993. The series was shot entirely in Madrid, Spain and produced by New World Television (U.S.), The Family Channel (U.S.), Ellipse Programme of Canal Plus (France), Beta TV (Germany), and RAI (Italy). 88 episodes of the series were produced, Raymond Austin directed 55 episodes and produced 37. There were 10 more episodes made than the first Zorro television series, which was produced by Disney in the late 1950s.

Since 2011, the series is airing in the United States on Retro Television Network as The New Zorro. Sony Pictures is the distributor for this version of Zorro.

== Synopsis ==
The series is set in early 19th-century Spanish California. When the commandant of Los Angeles, Alcalde Luis Ramone, terrorizes the people of the pueblo and oppresses them, Don Alejandro de la Vega summons home from Spain his son Diego to fight the alcalde and his men. When Diego arrives, he finds his town in a sorry state, and while pretending to have little interest in anything but books and his experiments, he creates the secret identity of El Zorro: The Fox. He and his mute servant, the teenage Felipe, battle the alcalde's tyranny.

== Cast and characters ==
The cast of the second season.

=== Main ===
- Duncan Regehr as Don Diego de la Vega/Zorro
- Patrice Martinez as Victoria Escalante (credited as "Patrice Camhi" Seasons 1–2)
- Juan Diego Botto as Felipe
- James Victor as Sergeant Jaime Mendoza
- Michael Tylo as Alcalde Luis Ramone (Seasons 1–2)
- J. G. Hertzler (billed as John Hertzler) as Alcalde Ignacio de Soto (Seasons 3–4)
- Efrem Zimbalist Jr. as Don Alejandro de la Vega (Season 1)
- Henry Darrow as Don Alejandro de la Vega (Seasons 2–4)
- Tabare Carballo as Sepulveda (Seasons 3–4) (Corporal in Season 3/Private in Season 4)

=== Guest stars ===
A

- Adam West
- André the Giant

B

- Bernard Kay
- Benito Martinez
- Ben Miles

D

- Daniel Craig
- Doug McClure
- Dougray Scott

F

- Faith Brook

G

- Garfield Morgan

H

- Hilton McRae
- Hunter Tylo

J

- James Horan
- Jesse Ventura
- Jim Carter
- John Hallam
- Julie T. Wallace

K

- Kevin Brophy

M

- Michael Culver

N

- Nicholas Clay
- Nigel Terry

O

- Oliver Haden
- Oliver Cotton
- Omri Katz

P

- Patrick Drury
- Patsy Rowlands
- Peter Guinness
- Peter Diamond
- Pete Postlethwaite
- Philip Michael Thomas

R

- Robert Hoy
- Roger Lloyd-Pack
- Roddy Piper

S

- Soon-tek Oh

T

- Terry Richards
- Timothy Bateson
- Tim Reid

V

- Valentine Pelka
- Vernon Dobtcheff
- Vincenzo Nicoli

W

- Warwick Davis

== Episodes ==
Season	Episodes	Originally released	
Season	Episodes	First released	Last released
Pilot		Unaired	
1	25	January 5, 1990	May 25, 1990
2	25	September 14, 1990	February 25, 1991
3	25	September 1, 1991	April 25, 1992
4	13	October 10, 1992	January 30, 1993

== Production ==
Out of the 88 produced episodes director Raymond Austin directed 55 and directed and produced 37. He also camera operated 83 episodes.

The title sequence of the first episode differs from the one used in the rest of the series. The rest of the episodes' openings use the same opening theme, but different clips, and the song is performed by Cathi Campo (Rosemary Clooney's niece), rather than a male singer.

Patrice Martinez is credited as "Patrice Camhi" in the first two seasons of the series. She was married to producer-director Daniel Camhi during that time. (He did not work on this series.)

Zorro's horse is usually named Tornado, but in this series he has been renamed Toronado. The bridle and breastplate worn by Toronado in this series are identical to the one worn by Zorro's horse in the Alain Delon film Zorro (1975) and by Chico, the Queen's horse, in the syndicated television series Queen of Swords (2000-2001).

Both this series and Queen of Swords were filmed in Spain. Zorro was shot at studios outside of Madrid in 1990, and filming for Queen of Swords took place at the Texas Hollywood Studios in Southern Spain in 2000.

Henry Darrow was the first actor to work in three different Zorro television series. He was the voice of Zorro in the animated series The New Adventures of Zorro (1981), and played the older Zorro in the short-lived CBS series Zorro and Son (1983) and Zorro's father in this series.

The original pilot (as included in the DVD boxed set Zorro: The Complete Series) focuses on a young man named Antonio de la Cruz, played by Patrick James, who is told by a mortally wounded Don Diego de la Vega to take on the mantle of Zorro. In this pilot Felipe is able to speak. Only Patrice Martinez albeit as a different character survived to the actual series. The pilot was filmed at Texas Hollywood.

=== Music ===
The Complete Zorro Soundtrack was released in 2012. It includes 25 tracks composed by Jay Asher and is available in CD and MP3 formats.

== Release ==
=== VHS ===
Two tapes of episodes from this series were released to the United States home video market in 1996. The first tape contains Parts 1–4 of "The Legend Begins" from the first season (which originally aired as a made-for-cable movie based on the series, and was released on VHS in that format), and the second tape contains the final four episodes of the series under the name A Conspiracy of Blood. Each tape's four episodes are presented as a 90-minute movie, with at least one scene in each movie that is not in the regular episodes.

=== DVD ===
Two separate DVD boxed sets are available in France. The episodes are dubbed in French and subtitled.

In 2009, the German company Kinowelt Home Entertainment released the complete first season of the series, dubbed in German.

The entire series is available on DVD in Region 1. In this set, the unique opening theme used in the series premiere is replaced by Campo's version, which was used in the rest of the series. Also, some of the episodes use the abbreviated version of the opening credits that appeared in reruns on The Family Channel. "The Legend Begins" is included in its episodic version, rather than as the expanded movie that was originally aired and later released on VHS. Other episodes that originally aired as one hour specials ("The Devil's Fortress" and "One for All") are split into separate episodes (as they were for reruns) on the DVD set.

Zorro: The Complete Series (Seasons 1-4)
Set Details			Special Features
Episodes: 88; Aspect Ratio: Full Frame (1.33:1); Number of Discs: 15 (R1); Languages: English (R1); Subtitles: None (R1); Rating: Not Rated (R1)			The Zorro Archives: The Mark of Zorro with Douglas Fairbanks, the first chapter of Zorro's Fighting Legion from 1939, trailers for three other Zorro serials, and from this series, the original pilot and a photo gallery set to music from the series.
Release Dates			The Zorro Archives: The Mark of Zorro with Douglas Fairbanks, the first chapter of Zorro's Fighting Legion from 1939, trailers for three other Zorro serials, and from this series, the original pilot and a photo gallery set to music from the series.
Region 1	Region 2	Region 4	The Zorro Archives: The Mark of Zorro with Douglas Fairbanks, the first chapter of Zorro's Fighting Legion from 1939, trailers for three other Zorro serials, and from this series, the original pilot and a photo gallery set to music from the series.
January 25, 2011	No Confirmed Release	No Confirmed Release	The Zorro Archives: The Mark of Zorro with Douglas Fairbanks, the first chapter of Zorro's Fighting Legion from 1939, trailers for three other Zorro serials, and from this series, the original pilot and a photo gallery set to music from the series.

Zorro: The Complete First Season
Set Details			Special Features
Episodes: 25; Aspect Ratio: Full Frame (1.33:1); Number of Discs: 4 (R1); Languages: English (R1); Subtitles: None (R1); Rating: Not Rated (R1)			None
Release Dates			None
Region 1	Region 2	Region 4	None
January 25, 2011	No Confirmed Release	No Confirmed Release	None

Zorro: The Complete Second Season
Set Details			Special Features
Episodes: 25; Aspect Ratio: Full Frame (1.33:1); Number of Discs: 4 (R1); Languages: English (R1); Subtitles: None (R1); Rating: Not Rated (R1)			None
Release Dates			None
Region 1	Region 2	Region 4	None
January 25, 2011	No Confirmed Release	No Confirmed Release	None

Zorro: The Complete Third Season
Set Details			Special Features
Episodes: 25; Aspect Ratio: Full Frame (1.33:1); Number of Discs: 4 (R1); Languages: English (R1); Subtitles: None (R1); Rating: Not Rated (R1)			None
Release Dates			None
Region 1	Region 2	Region 4	None
January 25, 2011	No Confirmed Release	No Confirmed Release	None

Zorro: The Complete Fourth Season
Set Details			Special Features
Episodes: 13; Aspect Ratio: Full Frame (1.33:1); Number of Discs: 2 (R1); Languages: English (R1); Subtitles: None (R1); Rating: Not Rated (R1)			None
Release Dates			None
Region 1	Region 2	Region 4	None
January 25, 2011	No Confirmed Release	No Confirmed Release	None
