= WΔZ =

- British theatrical release poster
- Directed by: Tom Shankland
- Written by: Clive Bradley
- Produced by: Allan Niblo; James Richardson
- Starring: Stellan Skarsgård; Melissa George; Selma Blair; Tom Hardy; Ashley Walters
- Cinematography: Morten Søborg
- Edited by: Tim Murrell
- Music by: David Julyan
- Distributed by: Vertigo Films
- Release dates: 30 July 2007 (Stuttgart Fantasy Filmfest Nights); 22 February 2008 (United Kingdom)
- Running time: 104 minutes
- Country: United Kingdom
- Language: English
- Budget: £5 million ($10 million)

WΔZ (pronounced double-u delta zed), is a 2007 British crime horror thriller film directed by Tom Shankland, written by Clive Bradley, and starring Stellan Skarsgård, Melissa George, Selma Blair, and Tom Hardy. The film was released in the United States with the title The Killing Gene.

== Plot ==
A pair of detectives attempt to solve a series of grisly murders in a dark, rain soaked New York, in which each victim has the Price equation (wΔz = Cov (w,z) = βwzVz) carved into their chests.

== Cast ==
- Stellan Skarsgård as Eddie Argo
- Melissa George as Helen Westcott
- Selma Blair as Jean Lerner
- Tom Hardy as Pierre Jackson
- Ashley Walters as Daniel Leone
- Paul Kaye as Gelb
- Michael Wildman as O'Hare
- Sally Hawkins as Elly Carpenter
- Michael Liebman as Wesley Smith
- John Sharian as Jack Corelli
- Alibe Parsons as Miss Allaway
- Sean Brian Chipango as Jamal Osman / Khaled Osman
- Barbara Adair as Alice Jackson
- Lauren Hood as Sharon Williams
- Sheila Kerr as Alison Lerner
- Joshua O'Gorman as Dominic Carpenter
- Robert Phillips as Captain Maclean
- Marcus Valentine as Hassan Harbi
- Peter Ballance as Trucker
- Igor Smiljevic as SWAT leader
- Larry Cowan as Junkie
- Laurence Doherty as NY Detective
- Roy McManus as Paramedic

== Release and reception ==
The film received generally positive reviews. Review aggregation website Rotten Tomatoes gives the film a score of 64% based on reviews from 14 critics.

CHUD.com wrote of the film, "Director Tom Shankland paints a grimy portrait that fits well with the Clive Bradley script. It is a great debut for both filmmakers who created a movie that works on almost every level."

DVD Talk wrote, "But let's not kid ourselves: This is a nasty horror thriller that has a Class of 1984 feel to it, although it has the most in common with the Saw series (even the line "Oh yes, there will be blood!" is morphed into "But there will be pain!"). It's not quite as outlandishly brutal, but it's still mean."

Fortean Times wrote, "While the plot twists rarely come as a surprise, the film's grimy feel and effective pacing, and a gripping – if occasionally rather over-exaggerated – central performance by Skarsgård, make this a genuinely thrilling venture into Se7en territory, despite the unfortunate silliness of the title."

== See also ==
- Price equation
- Social commentary
- Psychological torture
- Modus operandi
