= Tales of the Night (book) =

- First edition
- Author: Peter Høeg
- Original title: Fortællinger om Natten
- Translator: Barbara Haveland
- Language: English
- Genre: Fiction
- Published: 1997 (The Harvill Press)
- Publication place: England
- Media type: Print (hardback & paperback)
- Pages: 308
- ISBN: 9781860464201
- OCLC: 38435233

Tales of the Night (Danish: Fortællinger om Natten) is a story collection by Danish author Peter Høeg. It comprises eight short stories that are about "Love and its conditions on the night of 19 March 1929".

== Publication history ==
- Fortællinger om Natten 1990, Denmark, Rosinante ISBN 9788716146359
- Tales of the Night 1997, England, Harvill Press ISBN 9781860464201
- Tales of the Night 1998, USA, Farrar, Straus and Giroux ISBN 9780374272548

== Contents ==
Journey Into a Dark Heart
Homage to Bournoville
The Verdict on the Right Honourable Ignatio Landstad Rasker, Lord Chief Justice
An Experiment in the Constancy of Love
Portrait of the Avant-garde
Pity for the Children of Vaden Town
Story of a Marriage
Reflection of a Young Man in the Balance

== Reception ==
Jay Parini, in a review of Tales of the Night for The New York Times, wrote "Throughout this volume, Hoeg attacks the conventionality of Danish life, with its bureaucracy and rigid sense of duty, its reflexive worship of the institutions of science, law, commerce and art. When his urge to accumulate details and points of view does not drown the narrative, the stories blaze with intelligence and passion. But only in the bizarre, affecting tale of Ignatio Rasker's decision to throw everything away for love does Hoeg live up to his full potential." The Denver Post found "Though sometimes self-consciously philosophical, reflecting the author's youth and desire to declare himself a cerebral sort, every tale in this collection has its own fascinations."

Tales of the Night has also been reviewed by Publishers Weekly, Kirkus Reviews, Booklist, and Library Journal.
