= Life's Too Short (TV series) =

British mockumentary sitcom

- Genre: Mockumentary; Sitcom
- Created by: Warwick Davis; Ricky Gervais; Stephen Merchant
- Written by: Ricky Gervais; Stephen Merchant
- Directed by: Ricky Gervais; Stephen Merchant
- Starring: Warwick Davis; Ricky Gervais; Stephen Merchant; Rosamund Hanson
- Country of origin: United Kingdom
- Original language: English
- No. of series: 1
- No. of episodes: 7 (+1 special)

Production
- Executive producers: Ricky Gervais; Stephen Merchant; Mark Freeland
- Producer: Charlie Hanson
- Camera setup: Single-camera
- Running time: 28 minutes 58 minutes (2013 special)

Original release
- Network: BBC Two
- Release: 10 November 2011 – 30 March 2013

Life's Too Short is a British mockumentary sitcom created and written by Ricky Gervais and Stephen Merchant, and starring Warwick Davis, about "the life of a showbiz dwarf." Davis plays a fictionalised version of himself, and both Gervais and Merchant appear in supporting roles as themselves. The show began airing on BBC Two on 10 November 2011. Premium cable channel HBO, which co-produced the series with the BBC, has the US rights and aired the series from 19 February 2012.

In January 2013, it was announced that Life's Too Short would end later in the year with a special that would bring the series' closure. The one-hour special aired on 30 March 2013 in the UK and 5 July 2013 in the US.

== Background ==
The genesis of the show was when Davis worked with Gervais and Merchant in an episode of the second series of Extras, in which he co-starred with Daniel Radcliffe. Gervais said that Davis is funny in real life and tells great stories. Merchant said that Davis helped create the idea. Gervais and Merchant approached the BBC about developing a show centred on a character based on Davis.

The real Warwick tells us these great stories. They're comedy gold. (The show) is a cross between Extras and Curb Your Enthusiasm and One Foot in the Grave but with a dwarf. That is out and out funny."

In the programme, Davis runs a small person's talent agency and plays a twisted version of himself; quite conceited, arrogant and manipulative. He is supposedly doing a documentary to improve his career, and because he is going through a messy divorce and needs the money. Davis bugs Gervais and Merchant about whether they have any work, much to their annoyance.

In an interview with Jonathan Ross, Davis said that his character is egotistical and suffers from small man syndrome, Gervais said of the character

He refuses to live his life as a disabled person. We're making him empowered but also give him these foibles. Third in our trilogy of TV sitcoms … another naturalist observational comedy, dealing with everyday problems, human foibles and social faux pas … but with a dwarf.

== Cast ==
=== Main ===
- Warwick Davis as Himself
- Ricky Gervais as Himself
- Stephen Merchant as Himself
- Rosamund Hanson as Cheryl Wilkins
- Steve Brody as Eric Biddle, Warwick's accountant and lawyer

=== Recurring ===
- Jo Enright as Sue, Warwick's ex-wife and Ian's girlfriend
- Shaun Williamson as Himself
- Matthew Holness as Ian, Sue's boyfriend and lawyer
- Les Dennis as Himself
- Keith Chegwin as Himself

=== Cameo appearances ===
- Liam Neeson (episode 1)
- Johnny Depp (episode 2)
- Helena Bonham Carter (episode 3)
- Right Said Fred (episode 4)
- Steve Carell (episode 4)
- Ramin Karimloo (episode 5)
- Cat Deeley (episode 6)
- Ewen MacIntosh (episode 6)
- Sting (episode 7)
- Sophie Ellis-Bextor (episode 7)
- Val Kilmer (episode 8)

== Episodes ==
=== Series 1 (2011) ===
No.	Title	Celebrity guest star(s)	Original release date	Viewers (millions)
1	"Episode One"	Liam Neeson & Shaun Williamson	10 November 2011	3.21
Warwick seeks advice from old pals Ricky Gervais and Stephen Merchant, but Liam Neeson has beaten him to it. The film crew charts Warwick's every move as he tries to maintain his pride and self-respect in some very unusual situations.
2	"Episode Two"	Johnny Depp & Shaun Williamson	17 November 2011	2.07
Despite an awkward appearance at a sci-fi convention, an unsuccessful money-making brainstorming session with his assistant Cheryl, and a humiliating guest appearance at a Star Wars-themed wedding. Warwick's fortune seems to be on the rise when Johnny Depp hires him to research a new movie role until Johnny gets revenge on Ricky for humiliating him at the Golden Globes and storms out of the office.
3	"Episode Three"	Helena Bonham Carter	24 November 2011	1.25 (Overnight)
After complaints that he takes all the best roles for himself, Warwick launches a website and creates showreels for his clients. But he still takes on a role opposite Helena Bonham Carter.
4	"Episode Four"	Steve Carell, Right Said Fred & Les Dennis	1 December 2011	1.04 (Overnight)
During messy divorce negotiations, Warwick asks Ricky and Stephen for personal advice. Meanwhile, he moves into a new apartment and seeks election as chairman of the Society of People of Small Stature.
5	"Episode Five"	-	8 December 2011	0.97 (Overnight)
With mounting anxieties about the state of his work and home life, Warwick decides to explore different religions, and also returns to the dating agency where he met his wife Sue.
6	"Episode Six"	Cat Deeley, Keith Chegwin, Les Dennis, Shaun Williamson & Ewen MacIntosh	15 December 2011	1.26 (Overnight)
After accidentally throwing away his new washing machine, Warwick meets up with estranged wife Sue and her solicitor—and new partner—Ian to finalise their divorce settlement. But his decision to bring his accountant along for advice and support doesn't work out as planned.
7	"Episode Seven"	Sting & Sophie Ellis-Bextor	20 December 2011	1.13 (Overnight)
Warwick attends a charity event in the hope of hanging out with celebrities. However, in trying to impress Sting he ends up spending more than he can afford. Consequently he has to look for a new home and hopes Amy will see him again.

=== Special (2013) ===
No.	Title	Celebrity guest star(s)	Original release date	Viewers (millions)
8	"Special"	Keith Chegwin, Les Dennis, Shaun Williamson & Val Kilmer	30 March 2013	1.35
Things are looking up for Warwick when he is approached by Hollywood star Val Kilmer to film a sequel to 1988 dark fantasy adventure film Willow. However, he needs to help finance the movie himself, and he's got other things on his plate—such as balancing the interests of his clients at Dwarves for Hire, and managing a touring cabaret show starring Keith Chegwin, Les Dennis and Shaun Williamson.

== Development ==
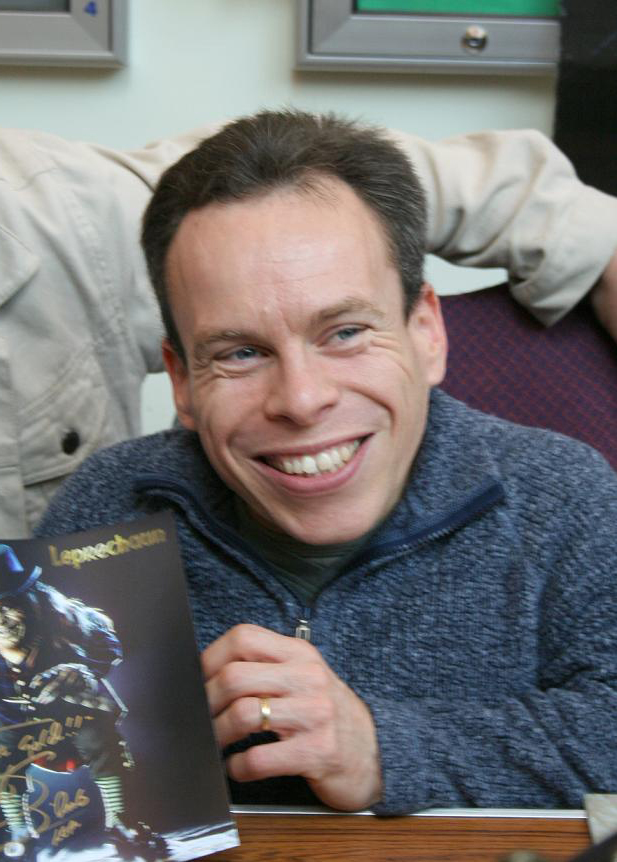
Warwick Davis, the star of Life's Too Short

Gervais first mentioned Life's Too Short on his blog in February 2010, when he and Merchant were writing and casting the project. They would go on to select Warwick Davis for the lead role after a number of auditions.

The pilot for the comedy was commissioned by the BBC in April 2010. Gervais reported on progress in his blog. In April 2010 he stated, "Some reports are saying that the Life's Too Short pilot we are shooting in the summer will be aired. It wont [sic]. It is a non-broadcast pilot. We will shoot the whole series before anything is aired. We're not sure how many eps [episodes] we will record (probably 6) and not sure when the series will air."

Gervais wrote on his blog in June 2010 that they had "Found the last location today for Life's Too Short. It feels great doing this project. Just like The Office and Extras. Starting from scratch, just me and Steve in a room crafting a brand new show. It doesn't get better than that for me." He later wrote that filming of the pilot was undertaken in June and July 2010. While talking at the Banff World Media Festival in July 2010, Gervais described Life's Too Short as "the funniest thing we've done". Gervais told The Hollywood Reporter "We're having so much fun working with Warwick. Pound for pound he is one of the funniest men I know." Stephen Merchant said of Davis: "Warwick is very funny, a very physical comedian which we really made use of … He's very charismatic, very charming in it … I was really pleased. He's a real comic star in waiting." Gervais went on to say that they had "Finished the pilot for Life's Too Short too. Just have to write the series now".

The series was produced by Charlie Hanson, who previously produced Extras, and Michelle Farr. Gervais and Merchant were executive producers, along with Mark Freeland. On 17 September 2010 the BBC announced, via the BBC Two Controller Janice Hadlow and the Controller of BBC Comedy Commissioning Cheryl Taylor, that the six-part series had been commissioned and filmed in 2011. Gervais reported in his blog on the progress of writing Life's Too Short throughout November 2010: "Had a great week writing Life's Too Short. It's the hardest bit, the most important bit and the most invigorating bit", and in a later entry "Wrote one of the funniest sketches we've ever done for Life's Too Short. Six hours hard labour for a potential two minutes screen time." In January 2011 he reported that he was still working on the scripts for the show, and in February that he and Merchant were trying to finish writing the series.

In March 2011 Gervais reported on his blog "Getting ready to film Life's Too Short." Merchant confirmed that filming would begin in May 2011. Cast members included Jo Enright, who played Davis' wife in the pilot, Shaun Williamson, who played himself (known as "Barry off EastEnders") in Extras, Cat Deeley, Rosamund Hanson, Kiruna Stamell and Jamie Dodd. Boxer Mike Tyson also asked Gervais to consider casting him in a role. On 31 March Gervais confirmed on his blog that "We've basically got first drafts of all seven episodes of Life's Too Short now. Yes seven!". As the pilot had already been filmed, the series would comprise eight shows. On 1 April he stated "Started casting Life's Too Short this week too. So much fun." On 29 April he wrote "Did the last of the casting today on Life's Too Short. Some amazing cameos too. You know about the [Johnny] Depp one, but hopefully we might be able to keep a couple of the other really big ones under wraps. Not just because of the surprise factor but because it takes the focus away from the real meat of the show." On 11 May the cast had their first read-through of all seven episodes, and rehearsals started on the week beginning 16 May 2011 with Gervais commenting "We've put together an amazing cast so it should be a joy." Filming started on 30 May 2011.

On 22 June 2011 it was announced that Sting and Steve Carell would be filming cameos for the series. The teaser trailer released on the same day featured Keith Chegwin, Les Dennis and Shaun Williamson as well as the three main stars. On 11 July Gervais hinted on his blog that a Doctor Who-related cameo would be in the show, as well as posting a link to a YouTube video of him and Davis filmed on the set of Life's Too Short. Earlier in that week he had blogged about how "Matt Groening's favourite character from The Office will make a cameo in Life's Too Short", along with an on-set photograph of actor Ewen MacIntosh who played Big Keith in The Office.

Principal filming ran for eight weeks ending on 22 July 2011. Gervais and Davis attended a question and answer session to discuss the making of Life's Too Short at the Edinburgh Fringe Festival in August 2011. A half-hour-long documentary, The Making of Life's Too Short, aired on BBC Two and BBC HD on 5 November 2011, prior to the start of the series run. After the first series finished airing, Gervais confirmed via Twitter that a second series had been commissioned for early 2013. Gervais joked on his blog, "We are thinking of going straight to the Xmas Special. Lazier and lazier. Now it's down to ONE series and a special. Ha ha." The series finale premiered on 5 July 2013 in the US on HBO.

== Home media ==
Life's Too Short was released on DVD and Blu-ray on 22 October 2012 in the UK, 7 November 2012 in Australia and on 15 January 2013 in the US. The Special was released onto DVD in the UK on 2 February 2015.

== Reception ==
=== UK critical response ===
In the United Kingdom the first series received mostly mixed reviews. Rachel Tarley, of Metro, described the show as "tripe" while David Butcher of the Radio Times introduced his review of episode six with "another week, another queasy mix of comedy and unpleasantness." Many reviews were deeply critical of the writing – Gwilym Mumford of The Guardian felt that writers Gervais and Merchant were "on autopilot", referring to the programme as "strikingly lazy stuff, comprised of little more than a predictable checklist of taboos and social faux pas", and journalist for The Independent Robert Epstein likewise branded it "shoddily derivative" and potentially degrading. T.J. Barnard, writing for WhatCulture, called the show "a mess. It's aimless, indulgent, self-plagiarizing and cold." However, Metro's review of episode 7 was slightly more positive saying "Life's Too Short bowed out tonight with an episode that was more than marginally better than the six previous offerings, not only was the plot stronger than in previous weeks, but there were some genuinely funny scenes too, most notably a discussion between Gervais and Merchant about charity. And Steve Brody as Warwick's ineffectual giggly/depressive accountant continued to shine."

More positive reviews could be found in The Telegraph, where Gerald O'Donovan praised the show for its "belly laughs and cringe-making moments." Likewise, Caroline Frost of The Huffington Post applauded both the writing and the acting following the first episode, proclaiming that though it could easily have overreached, "Gervais and Merchant have pulled another one out of the hat."

While the first episode rated strongly in the UK, the ratings dropped by 40% in the following week, and by the fifth episode the overnight ratings had dropped below a million, to 997,000—35% down on the average audience for its timeslot in the UK.

Critical reaction to the Easter special was more positive, Dan Owen of msn.tv said "this Easter special was one of Life's Too Short's better episodes and provided enough laughs and fun to please most viewers." He felt that the special felt like a new pilot for the show that "fixed a few problems." He felt that Keith Chegwin, Shaun Williamson and Les Dennis were the funniest parts of the hour. Overall he gave the special 3 stars out of five. The Metro agreed saying, "there were laughs to be had here, mainly from the antics of Williamson, Chegwin and Dennis." The Guardian praised the episode and called it "a piece of genius" and admired it for being "done with such a breathtaking boldness."

Harry Venning of The Stage gave a positive review of the first series also gave a positive review of the special "My favourite comedy of 2011 enjoyed a last hurrah. Sadly, it looks as though there will be no second series." He felt that Rosamund Hanson provided scene-stealing support as dippy secretary Cheryl. He concluded that overall Life's Too Short was "Painfully poignant, beautifully played and constantly inventive, this one-hour special conclusively proved that Life's Too Short's own end was also premature."

=== US critical response ===
In the United States, the show received generally positive reviews. At Metacritic, which assigns a weighted mean rating out of 100 to reviews from mainstream critics, the show received an average score of 63, based on 14 reviews, which indicates "Generally favorable reviews". On Rotten Tomatoes, the show holds a rating of 55% based on 33 critics, with the consensus reading: "Life's Too Short is enjoyably crass, but borrows heavily from Ricky Gervais and Stephen Merchant's previous work."
