= The Children (2008 film) =

- Theatrical release poster
- Directed by: Tom Shankland
- Screenplay by: Tom Shankland
- Story by: Paul Andrew Williams
- Produced by: Allan Niblo; James Richardson
- Starring: Eva Birthistle; Hannah Tointon; Stephen Campbell Moore
- Cinematography: Nanu Segal
- Edited by: Tim Murrell
- Music by: Stephen Hilton
- Production companies: Screen West Midlands; BBC Films; Aramid Entertainment; Barnsnape Films
- Distributed by: Vertigo Films
- Release date: 5 December 2008
- Running time: 85 minutes
- Country: United Kingdom
- Language: English

The Children is a 2008 British horror thriller film directed by Tom Shankland, based on a story by Paul Andrew Williams and starring Eva Birthistle and Hannah Tointon. The story centres around a virus that turns all children into blood-thirsty monsters during a winter holiday. The film premiered on 5 December 2008 and received positive reviews from critics. It was given a release in the United States by Lionsgate and Ghost House Underground.

== Plot ==
Elaine and Jonah travel with their two children, Miranda and Paulie, and Casey (Elaine's teenage daughter from a previous relationship), to spend Christmas with Elaine's older sister, Chloe, her husband Robbie, and their two children, Nicky and Leah. On arrival, Paulie vomits, which his mother believes is from motion sickness.

After opening presents, Nicky and Leah begin to show symptoms of an illness as Leah coughs up black bile with strange forms of bacteria. By the next day, all of the children have become pale and ill, and exhibit signs of disturbing behaviour.

During lunch, Miranda unexpectedly attacks Chloe and the children begin to cry. Robbie takes the other children sledding in the garden. But Nicky places a garden rake in the path of Robbie's sled, which slices open his head on impact. The children flee into the forest.

Casey plans to leave and meet up with her friends for a party, but becomes frightened when she finds Leah in the forest, laughing and cutting into something.

Back in the house, Jonah tries to call emergency services, but they are held up by the snowy weather. Paulie attacks Jonah and also causes Elaine to break her leg. Casey and Elaine seek refuge in the greenhouse.

Chloe finds Robbie's body mutilated by the children, and is attacked by Leah. Casey saves her, and Elaine in turn saves Casey from Paulie, accidentally killing him. Chloe accuses Casey and Elaine of going insane, and angrily runs off into the woods with Jonah to find the other children.

Jonah and Chloe are separated in the woods: Chloe finds Nicky and Leah, but they attack and kill her. At the house, Casey sees Miranda beating Jinxie's corpse and throttles her, Jonah arrives and Miranda tells him Casey attacked her. Jonah locks Casey in a bedroom as he and Miranda flee by car. Leah and Nicky break into the house and approach Elaine menacingly, but she cannot bring herself to hurt them. The kids attempt to cut into her stomach, but Casey escapes from the bedroom and kills Nicky.

Casey and Elaine drive off, but find Jonah dead in his car, having crashed into a tree. When Casey investigates, Miranda tries to attack her, but Elaine runs her down with her car, killing her. As Casey begins to vomit, Elaine notices a crowd of staring children coming close to them including Leah, prompting Casey and Elaine to drive away.

As Elaine drives, an unresponsive Casey stares vacantly, suggesting that she had been infected just like the children.

== Cast ==
- Eva Birthistle as Elaine
- Stephen Campbell Moore as Jonah
- Hannah Tointon as Casey
- Eva Sayer as Miranda
- William Howes as Paulie
- Rachel Shelley as Chloe
- Jeremy Sheffield as Robbie
- Rafiella Brookes as Leah
- Jake Hathaway as Nicky

== Locations ==
The film was shot in Cookhill Priory, a former Cistercian nunnery, and in the nearby villages of Cookhill and Alcester in the English counties of Worcestershire and Warwickshire, respectively.

== Box office ==
The film opened at 10th place in the UK, grossing only £98,205 at 132 cinemas. In the weeks after its release, the film dropped to 13th place and then again to 22nd place.

== Critical response ==
On Rotten Tomatoes, the film has an approval rating of 76% based on reviews from 17 critics. The site's consensus reads: "Unsettling and spine-chilling low-budget British horror, with effective and disturbing scares".

The film opened to generally positive reviews from UK critics. The Guardian writer Phelim O'Neill said, "the violence is skilfully enough executed to make you think you see much more than you actually do and the fundamentally disturbing and creepy aspects about such random and unpredictable child-centric mayhem are always present, no matter how ludicrously intense and darkly humorous things get". Time Out gave the film four out of five stars and said "This taboo-shattering movie taps in to primal fears about the unknow-ability of children, its blood-stained virgin snow and insidious terror recalling cruel fairy tales and ‘demon child’ movies such as The Omen."

In the United States reviewers were equally positive. Bloody Disgusting said, "The Children has it all and is guaranteed to please even the hardest to satisfy horror fan." IGN said of the film, "The Children is a flawlessly mounted horror film that knows exactly how to scare its audience."

== Awards ==
Director Tom Shankland won the Special Mention Award at the Fantasia International Film Festival in 2009 for his professional approach to the children actors in the film.
