= Skyscraper (2011 film) =

2011 film

- Film poster
- Danish: Skyskraber
- Directed by: Rune Schjøtt
- Written by: Rune Schjøtt
- Produced by: Morten Kjems Juhl; Birgitte Skov
- Starring: Lukas Schwarz Thorsteinsson
- Cinematography: Marcel Zyskind
- Release date: 15 September 2011
- Running time: 90 minutes
- Country: Denmark
- Language: Danish

Skyscraper (Danish: Skyskraber) is a 2011 Danish drama film written and directed by Rune Schjøtt.

== Cast ==
- Lukas Schwarz Thorsteinsson as Jon
- Marta Holm Peschcke-Køedt as Edith (as Marta Holm)
- Lucas Schultz as Ben
- Morten Suurballe as Farmand
- Rikke Louise Andersson as Vivi
- Lars Brygmann as Helge
- Mads Riisom as Fyr
- Emil Haugelund as Gut
- Julie Grundtvig Wester as Gravid pige
- Helena Wagn Ivansdottir as Tøs (as Helena Wagn Ivandóttir)
- Jeff Pitzner as Pølse
- Anders Hove as Buschauffør
