= Peter Diamond (actor) =

English actor

- Diamond as Iman Fasil in Highlander
- Born: Peter Alexander Diamond; 10 August 1929; Durham, England
- Died: 27 March 2004 (aged 74); Wakefield, West Yorkshire, England
- Years active: 1955–2004
- Website: http://www.peterdiamond.co.uk/

Peter Diamond (10 August 1929 – 27 March 2004) was an English actor.

== Career ==
Diamond trained at the Royal Academy of Dramatic Art and is remembered as a stuntman on television or film.

He appeared as the Tusken Raider who attacked Luke Skywalker in Star Wars Episode IV: A New Hope. He also contributed to the sequels The Empire Strikes Back and Return of the Jedi.

His film credits include several Carry On films, Never Let Go, From Russia with Love, Dracula: Prince of Darkness, An American Werewolf in London, Raiders of the Lost Ark, and Highlander.

Diamond's numerous television credits include The Adventures of Robin Hood, The Adventures of the Scarlet Pimpernel, The Adventures of William Tell, Sword of Freedom, The Saint, The Avengers, Paul Temple, Last of the Summer Wine, Heartbeat, London's Burning and Highlander: The Series.

He was stunt coordinator/swordmaster on the 1990 TV series Zorro and acted in three episodes, two as Sir Edmund Kendall who taught Diego de la Vega (Zorro) to sword fight, and directed eight episodes. This series was filmed in Madrid, Spain for the U.S. ABC Family channel.

He was a regular contributor to Doctor Who in the 1960s, as a fight arranger and actor.

== Filmography ==
- The Dam Busters (1955) - Tail Gunner (uncredited)
- The Dark Avenger (1955) - French Soldier Disguised as Peasant (uncredited)
- Follow a Star (1959) - Stagehand (uncredited)
- Circus of Horrors (1960) - Roadblock Policeman Who Gets Run Down (uncredited)
- Crossroads to Crime (1960) - Escort
- The Crimson Blade (1963) - Soldier / Servant / Officer (uncredited)
- Siege of the Saxons (1963) - Soldier (uncredited)
- The Gorgon (1964) - Constable (uncredited)
- The Face of Fu Manchu (1965) - Manchu Minion (uncredited)
- The Pleasure Girls (1965) - Rat-Face
- The Plague of the Zombies (1966) - Zombie (uncredited)
- The Psychopath (1966) - Junk Yard Man
- A Challenge for Robin Hood (1967) - Outlaw / Hangman (uncredited)
- Deadlier Than the Male (1967) - Car Park Assassin (uncredited)
- Star Wars (1977) - Stormtrooper / URoRRuR'R'R (Tusken Raider) / Corporal Prescott (Death Star Trooper) / Garouf Lafoe (Cantina Patron)
- Candleshoe (1977) - Hood (uncredited)
- The Empire Strikes Back (1980) - Snowtrooper Gunner / Lead Stormtrooper (uncredited)
- Superman II (1980) - Man in Street (uncredited)
- Raiders of the Lost Ark (1981) - German Soldier in truck / Arnold Erst Toht stand-in (uncredited)
- Ik ben Joep Meloen (1981) - Ober (uncredited)
- Victor/Victoria (1982) - Man in Bar (uncredited)
- Return of the Jedi (1983) - Biker Scout Pushed Off Bike / Unidentified Weequay Skiff Master / Lead Stormtrooper (uncredited)
- Nate and Hayes (1983) - Ben Pease Crew #4
- Highlander (1986) - Iman Fasil
- Superman IV: The Quest for Peace (1987) - S.W.A.T. team member with melting gun (uncredited)
- Indiana Jones and the Last Crusade (1989) - Second grenade throwing Nazi (uncredited)
