= Temi Oh =

British science fiction author, screenwriter and neuroscientist

- Born: London, U.K.
- Education: King's College London (BSci) University of Edinburgh (MA)
- Occupation: Novelist
- Writing career
- Language: English
- Genre: Science fiction
- Website: www.theonlytemioh.com

Temi Oh (born Temitoyen Ochugboju) is a British science fiction author, screenwriter, and neuroscientist of Nigerian descent. Her debut novel, Do You Dream of Terra-Two?, received the 2020 Alex Award. Her second novel, More Perfect, was published in 2023.

== Career ==
Oh was born in 1996 in London, to Nigerian parents. She did her secondary education at Bishop Thomas Grant and Emanuel School, Battersea. She attended university at King's College London, where she studied neuroscience and graduated with a Bachelor's of Science degree. She subsequently earned an MA from the University of Edinburgh. She married her husband Benedict Douglas-Scott and had a daughter in 2022. Temi Oh has also endorsed the use of the Freedom app as a way to increase productivity in an increasingly connected world.

Her debut novel Do You Dream of Terra-Two? was published in 2019 by Simon & Schuster and was featured in The Guardian's "Best Science Fiction and Fantasy Roundup". It was a preliminary nominee for the 2020 Nommo Award and received the American Library Association's 2020 Alex Award. As of 2019, no sequel was planned for the book.

More Perfect, Oh's second novel, published in 2023, is a "dystopian hypersurveillance" tale based on the classic Greek story of Orpheus and Eurydice. It took a bit less than eight years to go from her initial idea for the book to publication.

She has also authored tie-in short fiction connected to Black Panther, Doctor Who and Overwatch 2.

Oh's third and fourth novels are scheduled to be published by Simon & Schuster UK and Saga Press. The first of these, Not With a Bang, was published in May 2026 and is billed as "a family drama set at the end of the world".
