= Oliver Haden =

British actor

Oliver Haden is a British actor best known for his role in British film Blue Ice. He also worked at the Langley Academy as deputy-head teacher and teachers 6th form Drama.

In 2004 he starred in the British film A Way of Life, directed by Amma Asante, which won "The Alfred Dunhill UK Film Talent Award" at the 2004 London Film Festival and its director won the BAFTA's "Carl Foreman Award" for a debut by a British filmmaker, as well as being named The Times Breakthrough Artist Of The Year at the 2005 South Bank Show Awards. The film also won the Fipresci Prize for Best Film at the 2005 Miami International Film Festival, and a special commendation Signis Award at the 2004 San Sebastian International Film Festival.

In the film, Oliver played the role Hassan Osman, a Turkish Muslim and neighbour of a young single mother, who fears he is trying to get her daughter removed by social services. Osman is attacked by the girl's brother, who had a relationship with his daughter which the father discouraged and friends after an altercation at the library.

Haden has starred in The Bill, Zorro, Relic Hunter, London's Burning, Queen of Swords and Game On
