= Robert Hoy =

American actor, stuntman and director

Robert F. Hoy
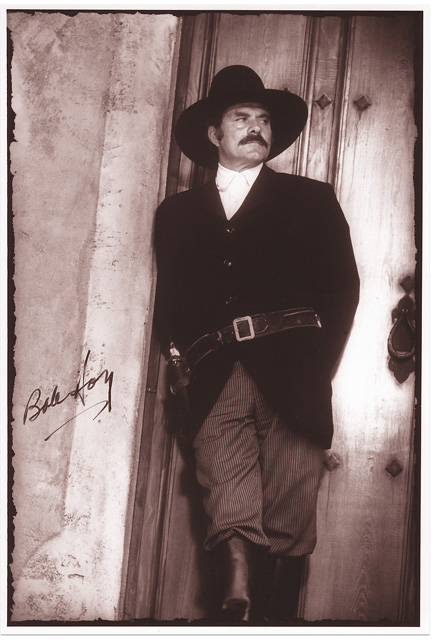
- =RFH=
- Born: Robert Francis Hoy; April 3, 1927; New York, United States
- Died: February 8, 2010 (aged 82); Los Angeles, California, United States
- Occupations: Actor; director; stuntman
- Years active: 1950–2005
- Spouse: Kiva (ca. 1987–2010)
- Website: bobhoy.com

Robert Francis Hoy (April 3, 1927 – February 8, 2010), was an American actor, stuntman and director.

== Life and career ==
Hoy was born and raised in New York. He joined the Marines and served in World War II.

Bobby Hoy's career spanned 55 years as first a stuntman, then an actor and director. He doubled for stars such as Tony Curtis, Charles Bronson, Audie Murphy, Tyrone Power, David Janssen, Telly Savalas and Jay Silverheels.

He appeared in more than 67 films included Bite the Bullet, The Outlaw Josey Wales, The Legend of the Lone Ranger, The Gambler II, Nevada Smith, Bronco Billy, The Enforcer and The Great Race.

On television, Hoy acted in more than 75 TV programs including The High Chaparral, where he portrayed Joe Butler from 1967 to 1971. Other credits include Combat!, Bat Masterson, Wanted: Dead or Alive, Walker, Texas Ranger, JAG, Dallas (recurring role), The Wild Wild West, Wonder Woman (2 episodes), Magnum, P.I. (5 episodes), The Young Riders and Zorro.

In 1961, he became a co-founding member of The Stuntman's Association of Motion Pictures.

Director and lifelong friend Raymond Austin put Hoy behind the camera as second unit director and stunt coordinator in Spain for the TV series Zorro and on the pilot of The Three Musketeers.

== Honors ==
On January 28, 2010, Hoy was honored with a Golden Boot by the Motion Picture & Television Fund, commemorating his contribution to the genre of Western television and movies in all three award categories: acting, stunt work and directing. It was presented to him in the penthouse suite of Northridge Hospital, the first time a Golden Boot has ever been given to an honoree in the hospital.

== Death ==
Bobby Hoy died on February 8, 2010, at Northridge Hospital after a six-month battle with cancer.

== Filmography ==
- Ambush (1950) – Trooper (uncredited)
- The Lawless Breed (1953) – Gyp (uncredited)
- The Man from the Alamo (1953) – Soldier (uncredited)
- Border River (1954) – Sgt. Johnson (uncredited)
- Taza, Son of Cochise (1954) – Lobo
- The Black Shield of Falworth (1954) – First Guard (uncredited)
- A Star Is Born (1954) – Soundman (uncredited)
- Four Guns to the Border (1954) – Smitty
- Bengal Brigade (1954) – Lancer (uncredited)
- The Silver Chalice (1954) – Rioter (uncredited)
- The Long Gray Line (1955) – Cadet Kennedy (uncredited)
- Revenge of the Creature (1955) – Charlie (uncredited)
- One Desire (1955) – Fireman (uncredited)
- Francis in the Navy (1955) – Creavy (uncredited)
- To Hell and Back (1955) – Jennings (uncredited)
- Kiss of Fire (1955) – Soldier (uncredited)
- Raw Edge (1956) – Five Crows (uncredited)
- Away All Boats (1956) – Seaman (uncredited)
- The Mole People (1956) – Mole Person (uncredited)
- Four Girls in Town (1957) – Indian (uncredited)
- Gun for a Coward (1957) – Danny
- Tammy and the Bachelor (1957) – Boy (uncredited)
- Man of a Thousand Faces (1957) – Assistant Director in Bullpen (uncredited)
- Lafayette Escadrille (1958) – Minor Role (uncredited)
- Live Fast, Die Young (1958) – Bit Role (uncredited)
- No Time for Sergeants (1958) – Minor Role (uncredited)
- Twilight for the Gods (1958) – Keim
- The Young Land (1959) – Cowboy (uncredited)
- The Big Fisherman (1959) – Minor Role (uncredited)
- Operation Petticoat (1959) – Reiner
- Spartacus (1960) – Soldier (uncredited)
- Wanted: Dead or Alive (1960) – season 3 episode 11 (One mother too many) – James
- Harlow (1965) – Tim – Unit Manager (uncredited)
- Tickle Me (1965) – Henry – Gardener (uncredited)
- The Slender Thread (1965) – Patrolman Steve Peters
- Nevada Smith (1966) – Tanner / Poker Player (uncredited)
- Assault on a Queen (1966) – Coast Guard Officer (uncredited)
- Tobruk (1967) – British Corporal
- Star Trek: The Original Series (S1E25) (1967) -- the Horta
- 5 Card Stud (1968) – Deputy Marshal Otis (uncredited)
- The Love Bug (1968) – Driver #19
- Rogue's Gallery (1968) – Collins
- Scream Blacula Scream (1973) – Cop #2
- The Don Is Dead (1973) – Hood (uncredited)
- Toke (1973)
- Bank Shot (1974) – Bank Guard (uncredited)
- Bite the Bullet (1975) – Lee Christie
- The Duchess and the Dirtwater Fox (1976) – Ingersoll (Bloodworth gang member)
- The Outlaw Josey Wales (1976) – Second Texas Ranger
- The Enforcer (1976) – Buchinski
- The Astral Factor (1978) – Harris
- Bronco Billy (1980) – Cowboy at Bar #2
- Hawaii Five-O (1980) – Rico
- The Legend of the Lone Ranger (1981) – Perlmutter (Cavendish's lieutenant)
- They Call Me Bruce? (1982) – N.Y. Bodyguard #1
- Jimmy the Kid (1982) – 1st Trooper
- Choke Canyon (1986) – Buck
- A Fine Mess (1986) – Detective Levine
- The Return of the Six Million Dollar Man and the Bionic Woman (1987) – Kyle
- Deadly Stranger (1988) – Sheriff Shepperd
- Big Chuck, Little Chuck (2004) – Robert Hoy
