= Tom Shankland =

British film and television director

- Born: Thomas Otto Shankland; 7 May 1968 (age 57); Durham, England, UK
- Occupations: Film and television director; screenwriter
- Years active: 1995–present

Thomas Otto Shankland (born 7 May 1968) is an English film and television director and screenwriter. He is known for directing the horror films WΔZ (2007) and The Children (2008), and television series such as The Fades (2011), Ripper Street (2012), and The Missing (2014); for the latter, he was nominated for the 2015 Primetime Emmy Award for Outstanding Directing for a Miniseries, Movie or a Dramatic Special. He has also been nominated for the BAFTA Award for Best Short Film twice, for Bait (1999) and Going Down (2000).

== Background and education ==
Shankland's father taught at Durham University, establishing the Italian department. His mother is Scandinavian. The family watched Italian and Scandinavian film. He went to school at St Margaret’s Primary School and Framwellgate Moor Comprehensive. He first gained visibility with a short film for Channel 4 called Bait in 1999.

== Filmography ==
=== Film ===
- Bubbles (1998; short)
- Bait (1999; short)
- Going Down (2000; short)
- WΔZ (2007)
- The Children (2008)

=== Television ===
- Hearts and Bones (2000; episode: "Once There Was a Way to Get Back Home")
- Clocking Off (2001; 3 episodes)
- No Night Is Too Long (2002; television film)
- Family Business (2004; episode "1.01")
- Jericho (2005; episode: "The Hollow Men")
- Agatha Christie's Marple (2006–10; 2 episodes)
- The Fades (2011; 3 episodes)
- Dirk Gently (2012; 3 episodes)
- Ripper Street (2012; 4 episodes)
- The Missing (2014; 8 episodes)
- Wicked City (2015; episode: "Pilot")
- The Leftovers (2015; 1 episode)
- House of Cards (2016; 1 episode)
- Iron Fist (2017; 1 episode)
- The Punisher (2017; 2 episodes)
- The City and the City (2018; miniseries)
- Les Misérables (2018; miniseries)
- The Serpent (2021; miniseries)
- SAS: Rogue Heroes (2022; miniseries)
- The Leopard (2025; Netflix series), remake of the famous 1963 movie, from the novel of Giuseppe Tomasi of Lampedusa
- House of Guinness (2025, 5 episodes)
- Berlin Noir (TBA)

== Awards and nominations ==
Year	Award	Category	Work	Result
2000	BAFTA Awards	Best Short Film (shared with Soledad Gatti-Pascual and Jane Harris)	Bait	Nominated
2000	Newport International Film Festival	Best Short	Bait	Won
2000	London Film Festival	TCM Prize	Going Down	2nd Place
2001	BAFTA Awards	Best Short Film (shared with Soledad Gatti-Pascual and Jane Harris)	Going Down	Nominated
2007	Sitges Film Festival	Best Film	WΔZ	Nominated
2009	Fantasia International Film Festival	Special Mention	The Children	Won
2009	Sitges Film Festival	Best Film	The Children	Nominated
2009	Bucheon International Fantastic Film Festival	Best of Bucheon	The Children	Nominated
2009	Neuchâtel International Fantastic Film Festival	Narcisse Award for Best Feature a Film	The Children	Nominated
2010	Fangoria Chainsaw Awards	Best Screenplay (shared with Paul Andrew Williams)	The Children	Nominated
2013	BAFTA Awards	Best Drama Series (shared with Richard Warlow, Will Gould and Stephen Smallwood)	Ripper Street	Nominated
2015	Primetime Emmy Awards	Outstanding Directing for a Miniseries, Movie or a Dramatic Special	The Missing	Nominated
