= A Way of Life (2004 film) =

2004 British drama film directed by Amma Asante

- Theatrical release poster
- Directed by: Amma Asante
- Written by: Amma Asante
- Produced by: Patrick Cassavetti; Peter Edwards
- Starring: Brenda Blethyn; Stephanie James; Sara Gregory; Nathan Jones; Marged Esli; Oliver Haden
- Cinematography: Ian Wilson
- Edited by: Clare Douglas; Stephen Singleton
- Music by: David Gray
- Release date: 2004
- Running time: 93 minutes
- Country: United Kingdom
- Language: English

A Way of Life is a 2004 British drama film directed by Amma Asante, starring Stephanie James. It focuses on a teenage single mother in Wales whose life spirals into violence amid poverty and racism.

== Plot ==
Leigh-Anne Williams is still only in her late teens and has already suffered the suicide of her mother when she was a child, as well as abuse at the hands of her father. She and her brother are close together in age, and they worry about their younger sister who is in her early teens. Their father later married their mother's sister and they have a much younger son together.

Leigh-Anne has had a baby daughter Rebecca, less than a year old, and is very protective towards her. The father is in prison, but his mother remains in contact with Leigh-Anne and suggests that Rebecca would be better off in her care.

Leigh-Anne has made quite a few significant enemies in her local area, a deprived part of South Wales. She is involved in constant confrontations with her Turkish Muslim neighbour Hassan Osman, and is so desperate to support her baby that she will commit shocking acts in order to get money. She tricks a much older man out of £30 by pretending to be a pimp. She gets a younger girl (under the age of consent) to have sex with the man, which doesn't come to the attention of the police but is witnessed by Hassan's teenage daughter.

Three of the few people who have good relationships with Leigh-Anne are her younger brother Gavin, and Gavin's friends Robbie and Stephen. But they are actively involved in crime including theft and anti-social behaviour, and Leigh-Anne is a willing participant or bystander in many of their antics. She receives regular visits from a social worker, and fears that Rebecca will be taken away from her. When Leigh-Anne sees her social worker talking with Hassan Osman, she fears that Osman is trying to get Rebecca taken into care by the local authority.

Leigh-Anne, Gavin, Robbie and Stephen are at a local library one day when they encounter Hassan Osman and his teenage daughter Julie, who has recently been in a relationship with Gavin. Julie's had effectively ended their relationship by his disapproval. An argument starts as they leave the centre, and it turns into a full-scale street fight in which the three boys brutally attack Osman while Leigh-Anne looks on.

After Leigh-Anne returns home, she is visited by the police, who want to question her related to an attack on Hassan Osman, who had died as a result of the beating. She leaves to go to the police station with them and sees her three friends being taken away, with Robbie still wearing the bloodstained jumper that he wore during the attack.

The last scenes show Leigh-Anne crying uncontrollably in police custody after her daughter has been handed over to Social Services. Her social worker says that nobody was planning to remove her daughter, and she had been speaking to Osman about his own daughter Julie's issues. Julie tells the police that she is pregnant with Gavin's baby.

== Cast ==
- Stephanie James as Leigh-Anne Williams
- Nathan Jones as Gavin Williams
- Dean Wong as Stephen Rajan
- Gary Sheppeard as Robbie Matthews
- Sara Gregory as Julie Osman
- Oliver Haden as Hassan Osman
- Brenda Blethyn as Annette

== Awards ==
A Way of Life won the "Alfred Dunhill UK Film Talent Award" at the 2004 London Film Festival and its director won the BAFTA's "Carl Foreman Award" for a debut by a British filmmaker, as well as being named The Times Breakthrough Artist of the Year at the 2005 South Bank Show Awards. The film also picked up the FIPRESCI Prize for Best Film at the 2005 Miami International Film Festival, and a special commendation Signis Award at the 2004 San Sebastian International Film Festival.
