= Amma Asante =

British actor and film director

Amma Asante MBE
- Asante in 2026
- Born: Lambeth, London, England
- Education: Barbara Speake Stage School
- Occupations: Screenwriter; film director; actress
- Years active: 1986–present
- Notable work: A Way of Life (2004); Belle (2013); A United Kingdom (2016)
- Spouse: Søren Pedersen
- Website: www.ammaasante.com

Amma Asante is a British filmmaker, screenwriter, former actress, and, since 2019, chancellor at Norwich University of the Arts. She first appeared in the BBC children's television drama series Grange Hill, and later wrote and produced the 1998 BBC Two television series Brothers and Sisters, starring David Oyelowo. She is known for directing the feature films A Way of Life (2004); Belle (2013); and A United Kingdom (2016), also starring Oyelowo. On television, she directed two episodes of season 3 of The Handmaid's Tale in 2019, and is co-creator, writer, and director of the internationally co-produced TV crime drama series Smilla's Sense of Snow, premiering on Australian television on 30 July 2025.

== Early life and education ==
Amma Asante was born in Lambeth, London, to Ghanaian parents: her mother was an entrepreneur who owned her own African cosmetics and grocery shop, and her accountant father received qualifications to work in the United Kingdom. She was a childhood friend of model Naomi Campbell, whom she met when they were seven years old.

Asante attended the Barbara Speake Stage School in Acton, where she trained in dance and drama. The school gave her the opportunity of drafting her first sitcom script.

== Career ==
=== Acting ===
Asante became a child actress and made her first appearances on television in Grange Hill and Desmond's.

=== Writing and directing ===
In her late teens, Asante left acting and worked in screenwriting with a development deal from Chrysalis. She founded a production company, Tantrum Films, where she wrote and produced two series of the BBC Two drama Brothers and Sisters (1998). Asante has since developed film projects in both the UK and US.

Asante used Tantrum Films to make her directorial debut with a feature film, A Way of Life (2004). It was developed and financed through the UK Film Council and was produced by Peter Edwards, Patrick Cassavetti and Golden Globe Award and BAFTA Award winner Charlie Hanson. A Way of Life focused on the life of a single mother, played by Stephanie James. It details the reality of a woman who recounts the suicidal death of her mother and the presence of foster care. It also introduces her brother Gavin, played by Nathan Jones, who was also taken into foster care. As a young 17-year-old, Leigh Anne (Stephanie James) finds it difficult to get by, especially due to the medical expenses that her daughter Eli Williams incurred. The film also touches on the theme of cultural conflict, involving their neighbour Hassan Osman (played by Oliver Haden), who had been the victim of a beating, after being accused of reporting Leigh Anne to social services for child neglect. The film has been described as "one of the most warmly received UK titles in the London Film Festival in the autumn and a harrowing drama in social realist mode". On 17 January 2005, The Times said of Asante: "She is one of the most exciting prospects in British cinema to emerge in the past 12 months."

Her second feature film, Belle (2013), is an historical romance. The film is based on Dido Elizabeth Belle, and depicts an illegitimate mixed-race daughter of an enslaved African woman and a Royal Navy captain. He placed the girl into the care of his uncle (and Belle's great-uncle) Lord Mansfield and his wife in late 18th-century London. In this film, Dido was being raised by a white aristocratic family and acquired many intellectual skills. She uses her personal experiences to debate the social and structural issues of her time, such as gender roles and abolitionism. Dido's role in the film has been said to be "a way that is usually denied to historical black women".

The film stars Gugu Mbatha-Raw as the eponymous lead character, Dido Belle, Tom Wilkinson as Lord Mansfield, who as a justice, ruled on two important cases related to slavery; Emily Watson as his wife and Miranda Richardson, Sarah Gadon, Tom Felton, and Sam Reid. Belle was the third project to receive investment from Pinewood Studios as part of its Pinewood Films initiative, established to help fund and support British independent films. The film was shot on location in the Isle of Man, London and Oxford. It was distributed through Fox Searchlight Pictures. A special screening of Belle, attended by Asante and Gugu Mbatha-Raw, took place at the United Nations headquarters in New York on 2 April 2014, as part of the UN commemorative events on slavery and the transatlantic slave trade.

In January 2014, it was announced that Asante would direct a thriller, Unforgettable, for Warner Bros. but she eventually left the project, announcing in March 2015 that she would instead be directing A United Kingdom, a period piece based on the interracial romance between the first president of Botswana, Seretse Khama, and his wife Ruth Williams. The film A United Kingdom, which Asante directed in 2016, features David Oyelowo and Rosamund Pike portraying the main protagonists of the real-life story, who marry, and with the coming independence of Bechuanaland, decide to move back there, despite British opposition to their relationship. A United Kingdom is based on the 2006 book by historian Susan Williams entitled Colour Bar: The Triumph of Seretse Khama and His Nation. Brunson Green details the filming process by explaining that "you could tell there were about 250 movie moments in this biography of this amazing couple, and so we kind of culled through all those moments and tried to figure out a storyline". During the IFP Gotham Independent Film Awards ceremony, Oyelowo mentions adding A United Kingdom to his list of movies because it was an African-based story directed by a female filmmaker. A United Kingdom opened the British Film Institute's 60th London Film Festival in 2016.

Asante directed "Useful", episode 3 in series 3 of Hulu streaming service's series The Handmaid's Tale. The series is based on Canadian writer Margaret Atwood's 1985 novel of the same name. The episode first screened on 5 June 2019.

Asante is set to direct a film adaptation of the book The Billion Dollar Spy, starring Mads Mikkelsen.

Since around 2020, Asante has been involved in creating, writing, and directing the six-part internationally co-produced TV crime drama series Smilla's Sense of Snow, which has its world premiere on Australian TV network SBS Television on 30 July 2025 and is distributed by ITV Studios. The series was made by German film production studio Constantin Film, in association with others.

== Other roles and activities ==
As of 2025 Asante is chancellor of the Norwich University of the Arts, since becoming the second in the role in 2019, after John Hurt.

Asante is a contributor to the 2019 anthology New Daughters of Africa, edited by Margaret Busby.

She is a past elected member of BAFTA Council and a past BAFTA Film committee member.

When she was in Grange Hill, she travelled to US for an anti-drugs campaign, and then met First Lady Nancy Reagan.

== Recognition, honours and awards ==
In November 2004, the London Film Festival awarded Asante the inaugural Alfred Dunhill UK Film Talent Award. In February 2005, Asante was named The Times newspaper's Breakthrough Artist of the Year and was nominated for Best Newcomer at both the Evening Standard and London Film Critics award ceremonies. That same month at the BAFTA Film Awards, Asante received the Carl Foreman Award for Special Achievement by a British Writer, director, or Producer in Their First Feature Film, which she has since cited as being a big break in her career. The 2005 Miami International Film Festival awarded A Way of Life as Best Dramatic Feature in World Cinema and the FIPRESCI prize (International Federation of Film Critics prize) for Best Feature Film. The Wales Chapter of BAFTA gave A Way of Life four of its top awards in April 2005, including Best Director and Best Film. Additionally, Asante was awarded for this film by the San Sebastian Film Festival in Spain and the Mar del Plata Film Festival in Argentina.

After the release of Belle, Asante was honoured by BAFTA in both Los Angeles and New York City as a "Brit to Watch", where special screenings of the film were held to celebrate her work.

At the 2014 Miami International Film Festival, Asante was awarded the Signis Award as director of Belle.

In 2014, Asante was made an Honorary Associate of the London Film School, where she earlier served as a Governor (2006–2007).

She was appointed Member of the Order of the British Empire (MBE) in the 2017 Birthday Honours for services to film.

In 2018, Asante became the first woman to receive the British Urban Film Festival honorary award from actress Dona Croll for outstanding contribution to film and television.

In the 2020 and 2021 Powerlist, Asante was listed in the Top 100 of the most influential people in the UK of African/African-Caribbean descent.

== Personal life ==
Asante was previously married to producer Charlie Hanson. She then married Søren Kragh Pedersen, former spokesman for European police in The Hague.

As of October 2024 she lives in Denmark.

== Filmography ==
=== Film ===
Year	Title	Director	Writer
2004	A Way of Life	Yes	Yes
2013	Belle	Yes	No
2016	A United Kingdom	Yes	No
2018	Where Hands Touch	Yes	Yes
2026	Billion Dollar Spy	Yes	No

=== Television ===
Year	Title	Notes	Director	Writer
2019	The Handmaid's Tale	Episodes "Useful" and "God Bless the Child"	Yes	No
2020	Mrs. America	Episodes "Shirley" and "Betty"	Yes	No
2025	Smilla's Sense of Snow	6 episodes; creator, writer, director	Yes	Yes
