= Peter Høeg =

Danish writer of fiction (born 1957)

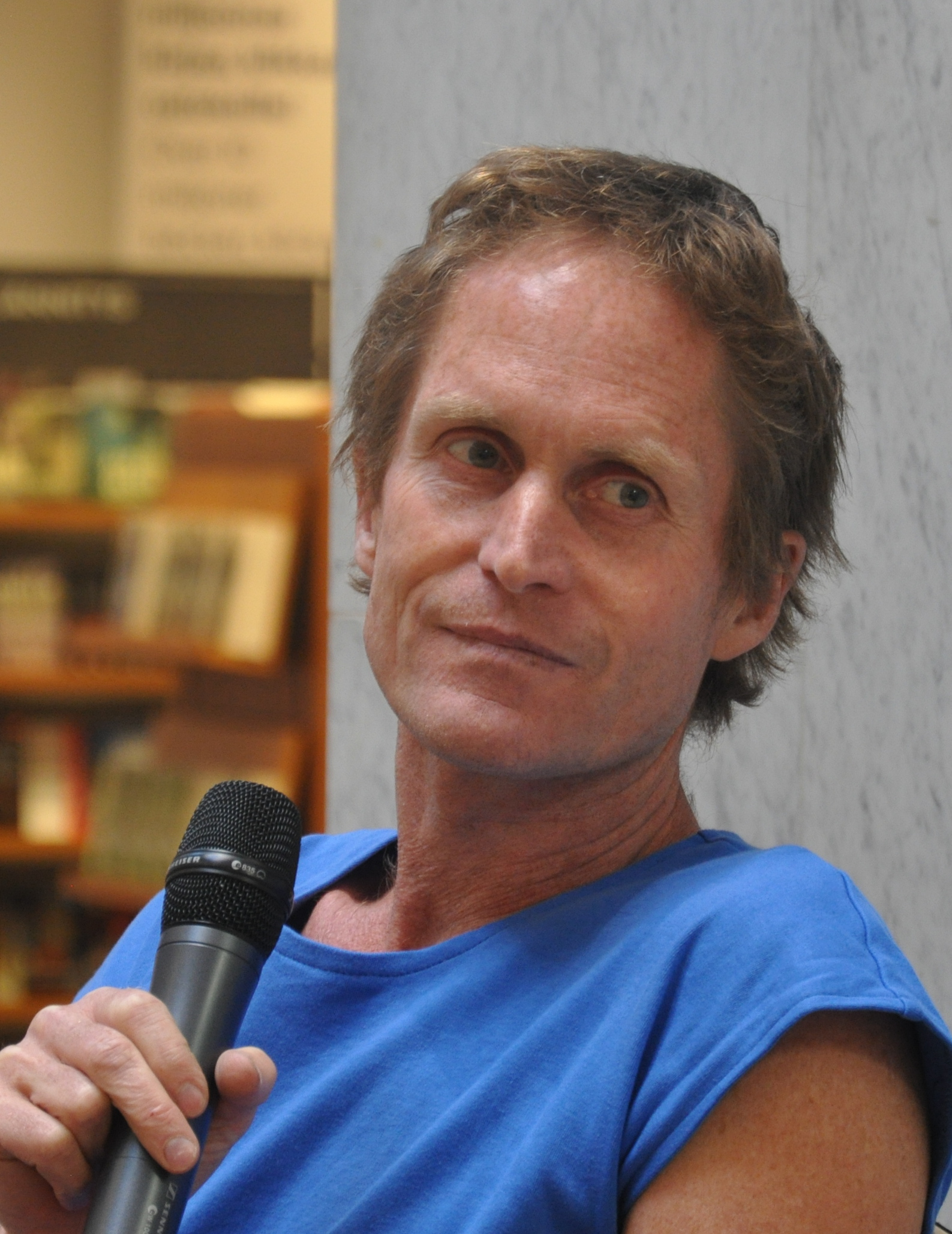
- Born: 17 May 1957 (age 69); Copenhagen
- Occupation: Author
- Writing career
- Period: 1988–present
- Genres: Fiction, recent history

Peter Høeg (born 17 May 1957) is a Danish writer of fiction. He is best known for his novel Miss Smilla's Feeling for Snow (1992).

== Early life ==
Høeg was born in Copenhagen, Denmark. Before becoming a writer, he worked variously as a sailor, ballet dancer and actor (in addition to fencing and mountaineering)—experiences that he uses in his novels. He studied literature at the University of Copenhagen under Peter Brask, a Danish literary scholar, composer and author. After a personal crisis, he spent a year working as a sailor on wealthy people's yachts, before returning to graduate with a Master of Arts in Literature from the University of Copenhagen in 1984.

== Career ==
Peter Høeg published his first novel, A History of Danish Dreams, in 1988 to very positive reviews. He decided at that stage to protect his personal life. Over the next five years he wrote and published the short story collection Tales of Night, and the novels: Miss Smilla's Feeling for Snow (1992), Borderliners (1993). It was Miss Smilla's Feeling for Snow that earned Høeg immediate and international literary celebrity. In 1993 he won the Danish booksellers award De Gyldne Laurbær (The Golden Laurel) and the Danish Critics Prize for Literature for his book De måske egnede (English title: Borderliners).

Høeg virtually disappeared in 1996 after the lukewarm reception of The Woman and the Ape.

=== Return and The Quiet Girl controversy ===
Høeg resurfaced in 2006 with The Quiet Girl, his first novel in 10 years. At the time of its publication, its reception in Denmark was mixed at best, and the novel was generally regarded as being either too complex or too postmodern.

Høeg was surprised by the response and has since said the complexity of the book was nowhere near that of films like Inception or Memento. Norwegian author Jan Kjærstad defended the book, saying: "it surprises me that a novel written by someone of Peter Høeg’s calibre, with such great intelligence, so much thought and originality, should be treated to such outpourings of pettiness and virulence. How could such a rollicking, generous, open book be greeted with so much gravity and severity, such closed minds and again: in my broad-minded old Denmark?"

In October 2007, the Danish literary critic Poul Behrendt published a book entitled Den Hemmelige Note: Ti kapitler om små ting der forandrer alt (The Secret Note: Ten Chapters on Little Things That Change Everything), in which he explains that the cold reception of The Quiet Girl was due to its complexity and scope, which the critics, according to Behrendt, didn't understand.

In 2014, his latest book, The Susan Effect (Effekten af Susan) was published in Denmark. The book is described by The Economist as a "high-concept thriller" featuring social breakdown, environmental disaster and atomic weapons in rogue hands.

== Style ==
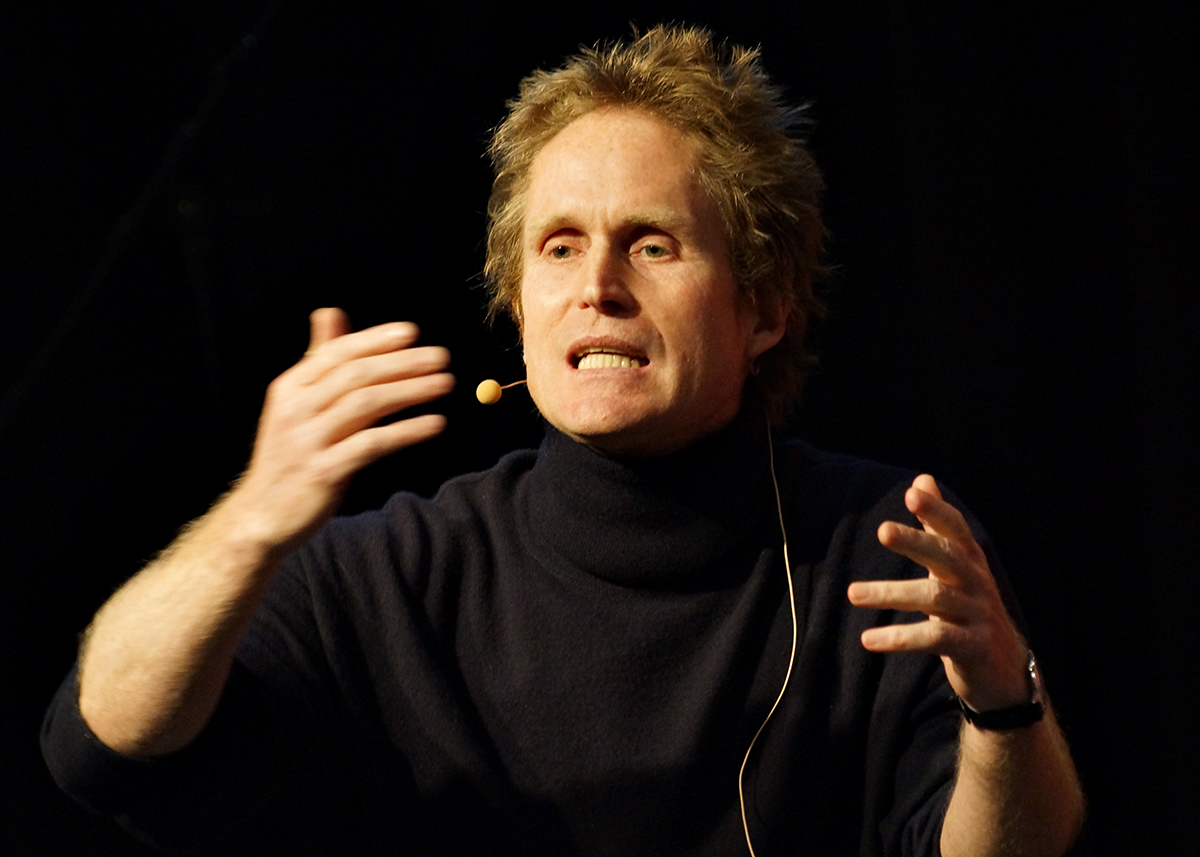
Peter Høeg (2012)

Høeg has a reputation for being hard to place in terms of literary style. All his works are stylistically very different from one another, and have been labelled postmodern, gothic, magical-realist, to mention a few. While Miss Smilla, for instance, was classified as Nordic noir, The Susan Effect featured magical elements such as in the case of the Svendsen family, which possessed one superpower or another in the narrative. There is a thread to be found, however, in terms of theme; Høeg's work often seems to deal with the consequences of the progress of civilisation.

In an interview, Høeg said that he follows a contemplative approach to his writing practices and this involved a pattern "of meditating, then writing, then meditating and then writing again."

== Personal life ==
Høeg grew up in Copenhagen and lives now in Nørre Snede in Jutland. He has four children. In 1996 he established the Lolwe foundation which provides financial assistance to women and children in the third world, especially in Africa and Tibetan exile areas.

== Books ==
Høeg's books are published in Denmark by Munksgaard/Rosinante, now a part of Blackwell Publishing, and have also been published in more than 30 other countries.

- The History of Danish Dreams (Forestilling om det Tyvende århundrede), 1988
- Tales of the Night (Fortællinger om natten), 1990
- Miss Smilla's Feeling for Snow (US: Smilla's Sense of Snow) (Frk. Smillas fornemmelse for sne), 1992, later filmed by Bille August
- Borderliners (De måske egnede), 1993
- The Woman and The Ape (Kvinden og aben), 1996
- The Quiet Girl (Den stille pige), 2006
- The Elephant Keepers' Children (Elefantpassernes børn), 2010
- The Susan Effect (Effekten af Susan), Rosinante, 2014
