= World's Most Wanted (TV series) =

2020 documentary television series

- Promotional poster for the series.
- Genre: Documentary
- Country of origin: France
- Original language: English
- No. of seasons: 1
- No. of episodes: 5

Production
- Running time: 45-48 minutes

Original release
- Release: August 5, 2020

World's Most Wanted is a 2020 docuseries, exploring five of the world's most wanted criminals.

== Episodes ==
No.	Title	Directed by	Original release date
1	"Ismael "El Mayo" Zambada Garcia: The Head of the Sinaloa Cartel"	Paul Moreira	August 5, 2020
2	"Félicien Kabuga: The Financer of the Genocide in Rwanda"	Thomas Zribi	August 5, 2020
3	"Samantha Lewthwaite: The White Widow"	Hugo Van Offel	August 5, 2020
4	"Semion Mogilevich: The Russian Mafia Boss"	Martin Boudot	August 5, 2020
5	"Matteo Messina Denaro: Cosa Nostra's Last Godfather"	Cyprien D'Haese & Caroline Du Saint	August 5, 2020

== Release ==
World's Most Wanted was released on August 5, 2020, on Netflix.
