= British Independent Film Awards 2001 =

British awards ceremony

4th British Independent Film Awards
- Awarded for: Best in British independent film
- Date: 24 October 2001
- Site: Park Lane Hotel, London
- Hosted by: Dermot O'Leary
- Official website: www.bifa.film

Highlights
- Best Film: Sexy Beast
- Most awards: Sexy Beast (4)
- Most nominations: Sexy Beast, Jump Tomorrow, South West 9 (5)

The British Independent Film Awards 2001 were held on 24 October 2001 to recognise the best in British independent cinema and filmmaking talent from United Kingdom.

To be eligible for consideration, films needed to have been produced, or majority co-produced by a British company, or in receipt of at least 51% of their budget from a British source. In addition they could not be solely funded by a single studio.

Nominations were announced on 26 September 2001. The award ceremony, hosted by Dermot O'Leary, was held at the Park Lane Hotel, in London's West End the following month, a change from the Café Royal which was the venue for the first three ceremonies. Winners in fourteen categories were selected from the shortlists and a further four were awarded entirely at the jury's discretion, whose make up included Primary Colours actor Adrian Lester, High Fidelity director Stephen Frears, director of the BBC film Last Resort, Paweł Pawlikowski, Christopher Fowler, Paul Trijbits, Parminder Vir and Stephen Woolley.

New award categories for Best Music and Best Technical Achievement were introduced in this year.

== Winners and nominees ==
Best British Independent Film	Best Director
Sexy Beast – Jonathan Glazer; Bread and Roses – Ken Loach; Jump Tomorrow – Joel Hopkins; South West 9 – Richard Parry; The Warrior – Asif Kapadia	Jonathan Glazer – Sexy Beast; Ken Loach – Bread and Roses; Michael Winterbottom – The Claim; Michael Apted – Enigma
Best Actor	Best Actress
Ben Kingsley – Sexy Beast as Don Logan; Ian Hart – Liam as Dad; Timothy Spall – Lucky Break as Cliff Gumbell; Ray Winstone – Sexy Beast as Gary "Gal" Dove	Kate Ashfield – Late Night Shopping as Jody; Susan Lynch – Beautiful Creatures as Dorothy; Samantha Morton – Pandaemonium as Sara Coleridge; Kate Winslet – Enigma as Hester Wallace
Best Screenplay	Most Promising Newcomer
Sexy Beast – Louis Mellis and David Scinto; Bread and Roses – Paul Laverty; The Claim – Frank Cottrell-Boyce; Jump Tomorrow – Joel Hopkins	Ben Whishaw – My Brother Tom as Tom; Ingrid de Souza – Princesa as Fernanda; Mark Letheren – South West 9 as Mitch; Natalia Verbeke – Jump Tomorrow as Alicia
Best International Independent Film (English Language)	Best International Independent Film (Foreign Language)
Memento – Christopher Nolan; Chopper – Andrew Dominik; Dark Days – Marc Singer; Hedwig and the Angry Inch – John Cameron Mitchell	In the Mood for Love – Wong Kar-wai; Amores Perros – Alejandro González Iñárritu; Le Gout Des Autres – Agnès Jaoui; Songs from the Second Floor – Roy Andersson
Best Technical Achievement	Best Achievement in Production
The Warrior – Roman Osin (DOP / Cinematography); Alone – Nick Lofting / Jonathan Rudd (Editing) (Note: Archived websites of the time including the BBC and Variety list the nominee as Nick Lofting. The BIFA website lists Jonathan Rudd as the nominee. Both worked as editors on the film in question); Enigma – John Beard (Production design); High Heels and Low Lifes – Jany Temime (Costume design)	Gas Attack – Samantha Kingsley; Kin –; Late Night Shopping – Angus Lamont; South West 9 – Allan Niblo
Best Original Music	Douglas Hickox Award (Best Debut Director)
South West 9 – Dave Pearce; Christie Malry's Own Double-Entry – Luke Haines; Jump Tomorrow – John Kimbrough; The Warrior – Dario Marianelli	Asif Kapadia –The Warrior; Joel Hopkins – Jump Tomorrow; Saul Metzstein – Late Night Shopping; Richard Parry – South West 9
The Variety Award	Producer of the Year
Richard Curtis	Jeremy Thomas
Special Jury Prize	Lifetime Achievement Award
Harvey and Bob Weinstein (Note: The award to Harvey Weinstein mentioned by the BBC, ScreenDaily, IndieWire and archived BIFA website of the time may have been rescinded as it is no longer mentioned on the current (2024) BIFA website.)	Chris Menges

=== Films with multiple nominations ===
Nominations	Film
5	Sexy Beast
5	Jump Tomorrow
5	South West 9
4	The Warrior
3	Bread and Roses
3	Late Night Shopping
3	Enigma
2	The Claim
