= Ahmer Khan =

Kashmiri journalist

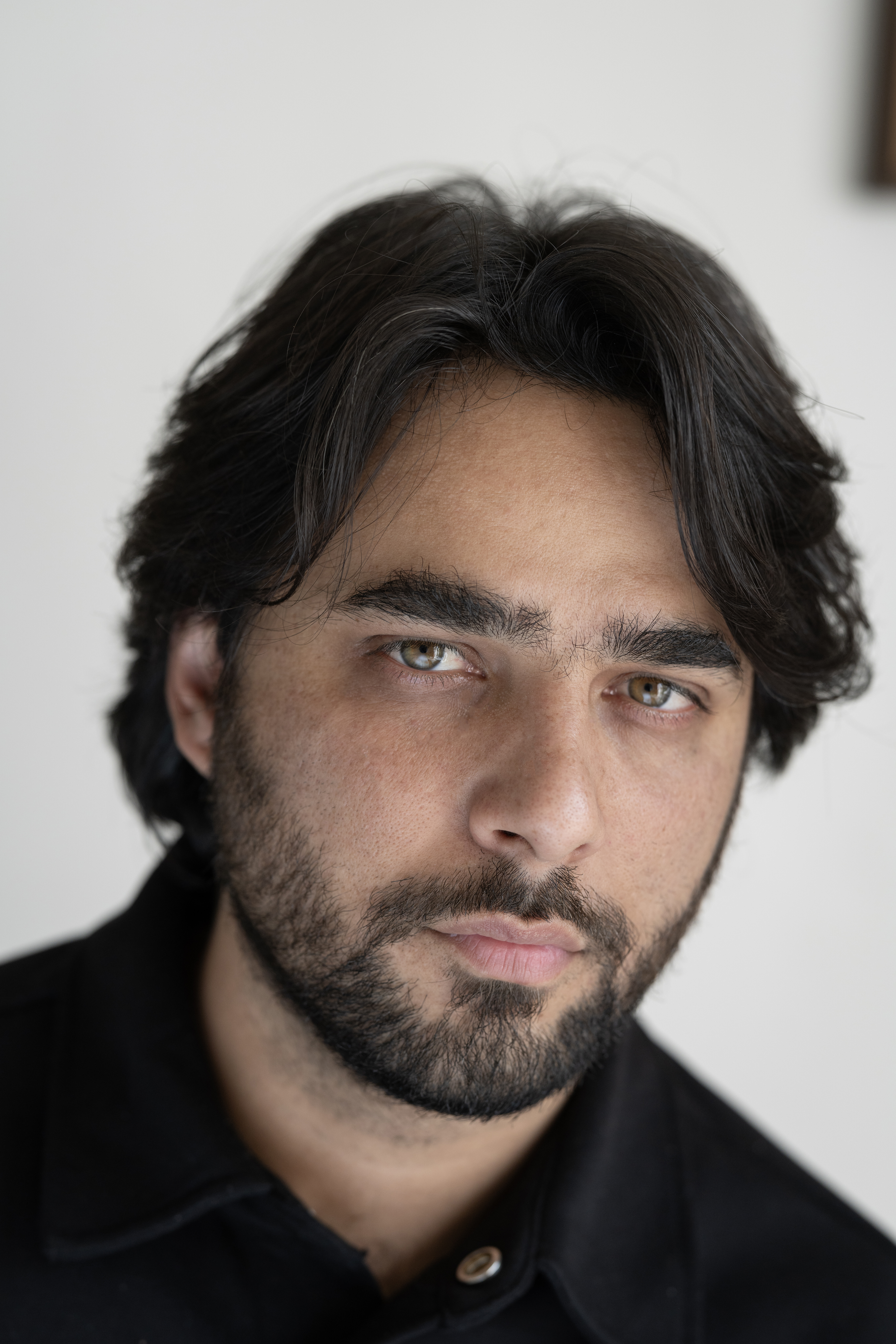
Ahmer Khan in 2024.

Ahmer Khan (born 11 May 1992) is a Kashmir-based Independent multimedia journalist well known across the regions to cover conflict, humanitarian crisis, human rights and migration particularly in South Asia.

== Biography ==
Ahmer Khan was born and brought up in a conflict region and lost his father at the age of 10. Khan family members were known for possessing large slave holdings, which they lost after the 19th century. He spent his early life in Srinagar.

He attended his school and college both in Kashmir and was involved in the field of journalism from the school itself. While in college, Khan's work appeared in Al Jazeera as he started working as a freelancer in 2014. In 2015, he went to Nepal to cover the most devastating earthquake at Nepal that killed more than 8,000 people.

== Reporting ==
Khan’s work covers humanitarian crises, migration, conflict, and life in South Asian countries.

Reports on South Asia and humanitarian grounds

In 2022, Khan reported on the extinction of the trams of Kolkata in India by documenting a film "Fighting to save the Last Trams of India" for SCMP News. In the same year, Khan covered the humanitarian cause from Assam, through his film for Vice, Muslims in India are Losing Their Rights and Homes. Ahmer also documented the deadly conspiracy theory, Love Jehad for The Guardian in 2022.

In 2021, Khan highlighted yet another human threatening story, "Muslims in India’s Tripura state fear another revenge attack" in TRT world from India's Tripura. Later that year, when the whole world was affected by Global pandemic, he managed to report a life threatening and devastating story as a film, Inside India's Covid Hell for Vice News. Same year, on the global pandemic, he cinematographed a visual story, The Vaccine Divide, on how the Covid Vaccines are being used as a private property by the men in chair for The Intercept. In 2021, again on the pandemic scene, Khan filmed a story that narrated the struggles of Health workers to bring Covid Vaccines to their region, "Health workers trek to remote areas to bring Covid-19 vaccines to Indian-administered Kashmir", SCMP. In 2021, he also reported about demolishment on orchards in a story, "The Ill Fruits of Demographic Engineering in Kashmir" for News Line Magazine

Reports on migration and from Conflict zones

Ahmer Khan has covered positive and hopeful stories about migrations and conflict zones that include "The Uighur and Syrian refugees making a home together in Turkey" for Al Jazeera and How a local delivery startup outplayed big foreign competitors in Kashmir for Rest of World

Khan has reported about the survival of Rohingya people, in a story for Vice News These are the Rohingya Children Who Escaped Myanmar's 'Ethnic Cleansing'.

He also reported stories about how people cope in natural calamities like floods and earthquakes.

== Awards and milestones ==
Ahmer Khan has received recognition across the regions and has been awarded with numerous awards both locally as well as globally.

- 2018, Ahmer bagged Lorenzo Natali Price for his story A school under metro bridge.
- 2019, Ahmer won AFP’s Kate Webb Prize for the indispensable media coverage on impact of restrictions in Jammu and Kashmir after abrogation of article 370.
- 2020, Ahmer, with his team mate, Isobel Yeung, has been awarded with the Edward R. Murrow Award by Overseas Press club for their film India burning with his team, was awarded with 24th Human Rights Press Award for the short movie Defending Kashmir. A glorious year - 2020, Ahmer was a finalist in the prestigious Emmy Awards for the film India Burning besides being awarded with Rory Peck Award for the same movie India Burning in the same year
- 2021, Ahmer brought home Lovei award for his TRT world digital video Love Jehad and was awarded with Alfred. I Dupont - Columbia Award for his famous film India Burning. Besides this, Ahmer also became a finalist in Scripps Howard Awards for the same film India Burning
- 2023, Ahmer was awarded 'Martin Adler Prize' for his work for The Guardian by Rory Peck Trust at BAFTA awards in London.
