= David Loyn =

English journalist (born 1954)

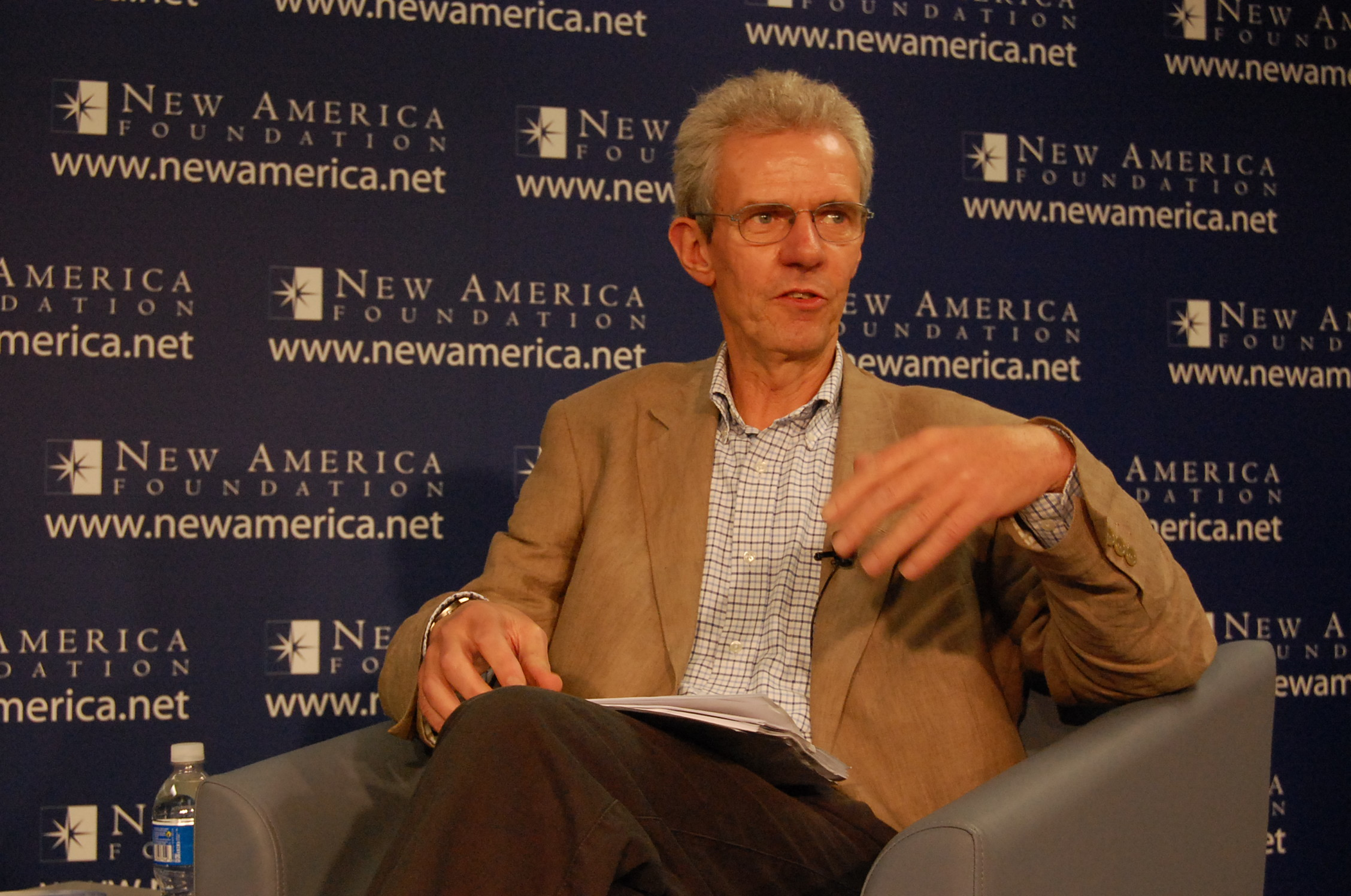
Loyn in 2009

David Loyn (born 1 March 1954) has been a foreign correspondent since the late 1970s, mostly with the BBC. He is an authority on Afghan history.

== Education ==
Loyn was educated at Oundle School, a boarding independent school in the historic market town of Oundle on the River Nene in Northamptonshire, in the East Midlands region of England, where he boarded at Bramston House, followed by Christ Church at the University of Oxford.

== Life and career ==
Loyn worked as a radio correspondent for IRN for eight years, and in 1987 he joined the BBC as a TV correspondent. He was the BBC's International Development correspondent, a post he vacated at the end of July, 2015.

Loyn has frequently sought to report on the motivation of insurgent groups, including interviews with Hamas and Hezbollah leaders in Lebanon, Maoist Naxalite rebels in India, Kashmiri separatists, and the Kosovo Liberation Army. He has conducted several significant exclusive interviews with the Taliban in Afghanistan.

He reported extensively from Eastern Europe in the early 1980s, witnessing the birth of the Solidarity Union in Poland and interviewing Lech Wałęsa.

In 1984 his reports on the massacres in India which followed the death of Indira Gandhi won him the Sony Award as Radio Reporter of the Year.

In 1989 Loyn reported on the collapse of communism across Eastern Europe, including the fall of the Berlin Wall and the revolution in Romania.

In 1993 he became the first new BBC correspondent in India for more than 20 years, following Mark Tully.

In 1996 Loyn and his team (Rahimullah Yusufzai, Fred Scott and Vladimir Lozinski) were the only journalists with the Taliban when they took Kabul.

In 1998 (with Vaughan Smith), he secured exclusive access to the Kosovo Liberation Army to report from behind their lines in a series of reports that won the Foreign News Award from the Royal Television Society, the first of two awards won by Loyn that year; he was also made the RTS Journalist of the Year.

As International Development Correspondent, Loyn reported frequently from conflict and disaster zones, particularly in Africa.

In 2006 Loyn travelled to Helmand province to interview the Taliban for a series of exclusive reports.

== International reporting work ==
Loyn has written extensively on how international development issues are reported. He has been a long-term advocate of better understanding of the effects of reporting violence, both on the journalists and for those on the receiving end. He is on the European board of the Dart Centre for Journalism and Trauma. He is also a member of the Dart Society, which brings together journalists on both sides of the Atlantic. But Loyn has been an opponent of a school of journalism known as 'Peace News', and debated with its supporters both in public and in a widely cited academic discourse.

Loyn is on the board of the Media Standards Trust and a trustee of the Roddy Scott Foundation. He is on the Advisory Council of the Mcdonald Centre for Theology, Ethics and Public Life in Oxford, and is a founder member of London's Frontline Club.

== Publications ==
Loyn's first book, Frontline, told the story of the Frontline Television News agency. It was shortlisted for the 2005 Orwell Prize. It is currently in production as a feature film. His second book, Butcher and Bolt – 200 years of foreign engagement in Afghanistan, was published in 2008 (in the US, the book is called In Afghanistan).

Butcher and Bolt was widely seen as providing insight into why the Afghan war proved a far harder fight than it had initially looked in 2001. The book drew parallels between foreign engagements in the past and today to suggest why Afghanistan was harder to hold than it was to take.

== Personal life ==
Loyn is a practising Catholic. He says that "because of my faith, I also understand there is a spiritual aspect to conflict" and that he believes the conflicts on which he has reported for many years "do have a spiritual heart, which we rather miss in our reporting."
