= Rory Peck Trust =

Organization

- Founded: April 24, 1995
- Founder: Juliet Crawley Peck
- Type: International nongovernmental organization
- Purpose: Journalist assistance and freedom of expression
- Location: London, England
- Key people: Clothilde Redfern; Director
- Website: rorypecktrust.org//

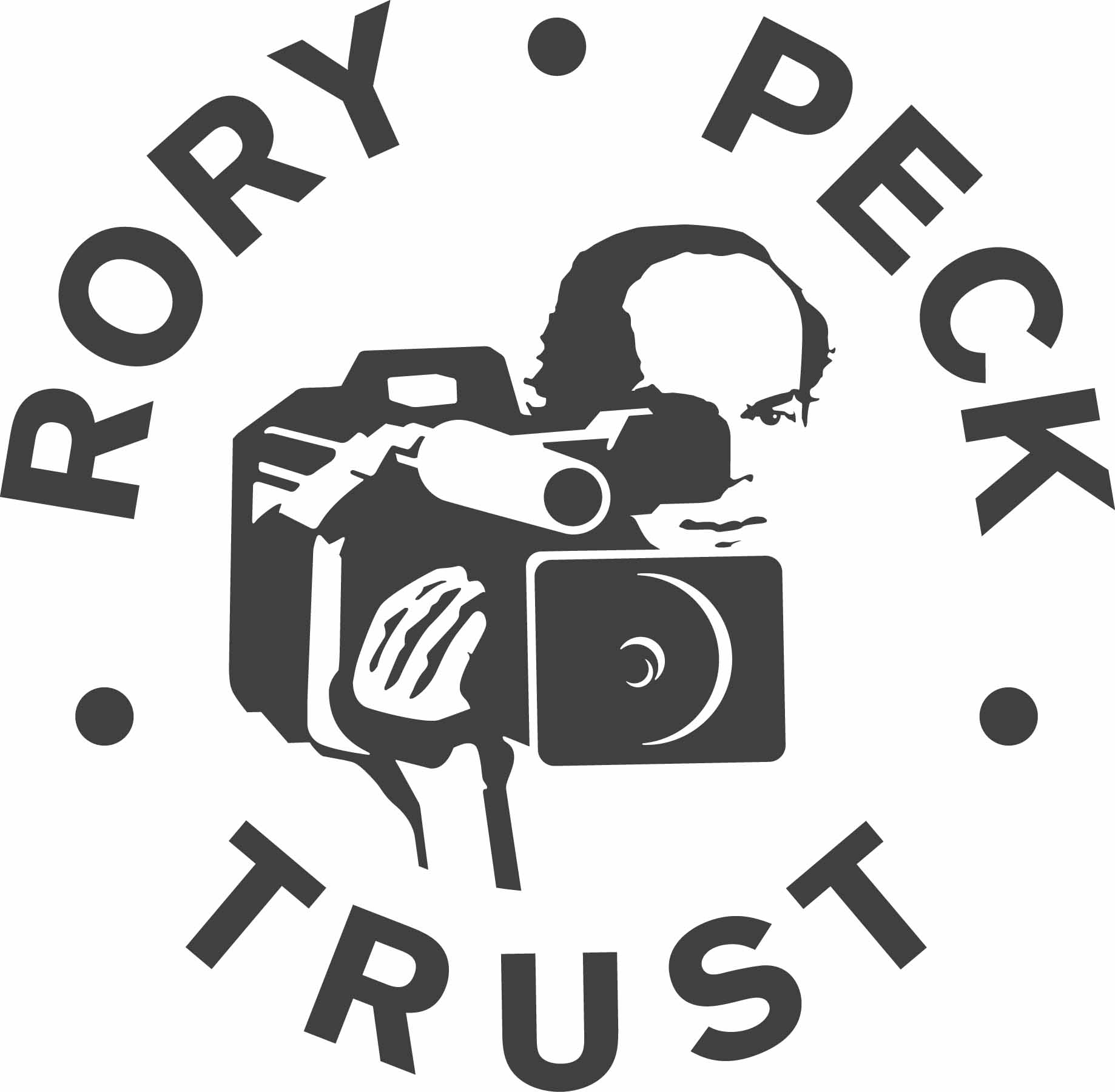

The Rory Peck Trust is an international NGO that supports freelance journalists and their families in crisis. Based in London, England, it provides practical assistance and support to freelance journalists worldwide, to raise their profile, promote their welfare and safety, and support their right to report freely and without fear. It also runs the annual Rory Peck Awards.

== History ==
Freelance cameraman Rory Peck was killed in Moscow in 1993. In 1995, his widow, Juliet, founded the Trust in his memory. Originally established to run the Rory Peck Awards, the scope of the Trust's work grew, and in 1998 the Freelance Assistance Programme was established, providing emergency grants to freelance journalists in crisis. In 2000, the Rory Peck Training Fund was set up, which provides hostile environment training bursaries to freelancers. The Trust now gives over 100 grants each year to freelancers worldwide.

== The Rory Peck Awards ==
Each year the Martin Adler Prize is awarded to a freelancer who has made a significant contribution to newsgathering. The aim of the prize is to highlight the dedication and talent of freelancers who work under challenging circumstances within their own country. The prize is named in honour of Martin Adler, a freelance journalist who was killed in Somalia in 2006. The award for 2020 went to Maha Hussaini, a female Palestinian journalist working for Middle East Eye who reports on Gaza.
