= Lorenzo Natali Prize =

Annual journalism award

- Awarded for: Outstanding Journalism
- Presented by: DG INTPA
- Reward: 40 000 EUR
- First award: 1992
- Website: Lorenzo Natali Prize

The Lorenzo Natali Prize is a journalism prize awarded annually by the European Commission's Directorate-General for International Partnerships (DG INTPA) since 1992. The prize rewards outstanding reporting on issues related to climate, environment and energy, digital and infrastructure, gender equality, human development, migration and forced displacement, peace and governance, sustainable growth and jobs, and youth.

== History ==
Named after Lorenzo Natali, an Italian politician and former European Commissioner, the Lorenzo Natali Media Prize was established in 1992 to celebrate the work of journalists who report on stories about the social, political, economic and environmental dimensions of development around the world. It recognises journalism's contribution to building more sustainable, fairer and more prosperous societies, in line with the European Union's development policies.

The Prize was not awarded between 1995 and 1997. In 1998 the prize was relaunched in collaboration with the International Federation of Journalists who was a partner in managing the award for several years.

== Entry criteria ==
The Lorenzo Natali Media Prize accepts published work from print, online and broadcast reporters from European Union countries as well as the EU's international partner countries. This year, journalists could enter in one of four categories:

- Best Emerging Journalist Award: Open to journalists between 18 and 25.
- Investigative Journalism Award: Reporting whose objective is to uncover serious issues such as crimes, injustice, corruption, or corporate wrongdoing, and to expose these to the public.
- Feature Journalism Award: Reporting focusing on entertaining, educating, engaging or informing the audience.
- Special Award: The 2024 edition will recognise photojournalism work.

== Selection of winners ==
Prize applications were pre-selected by four journalism faculties: Vesalius College, Belgium, the Catholic University of Portugal, Universidad de Navarra, Spain, and Université Saint-Joseph de Beyrouth, Lebanon. Pre-selected entries were then evaluated by a Grand Jury of journalists and representatives from key non-governmental organisations around the world. The 2024's Grand Jury featured Inday Espina-Varona, Stefanie Glinski, Ntibinyane Alvin Ntibinyane, Delia Rodríguez, and Artur Romeu. The winner of each category is awarded EUR 10,000 and the winner of the Best Emerging Journalist Award is offered a work experience/a traineeship with a media partner.

=== Winners of the 32nd edition Lorenzo Natali Prize ===
- Best Emerging Journalist Award: Jamaima Afridi
- Investigative Journalism Award: Martin Boudot, Manon de Couët and Mathilde Cusin
- Feature Journalism Award: Gabriela Ramírez and Tina Xu
- Special Award – Photojournalism: Bienvenido Velasco

== Past winners ==
The first edition in 1992 was won by Reporters Without Borders. Since then, more than 100 published reports have been celebrated for their contribution to society across several categories. Journalists celebrated by the prize include:

- Charles Onyago Obbo (1993)
- Palagummi Sainath (1994)
- Robert Mugagga (1998)
- Fariha Razzaq Haroon (1999)
- Ibiba Don Pedro (2000)
- Mauri König (2002 and 2006)
- Mark Doyle and Ed Butler (2010)
- Humberto Padgett Leon (2015)
- Drabo Ousmane (2017)
- Ahmer Khan (2018)
- Glenda Giron (2019)
- Shola Lawal (2020)
- Srishti Jaswal (2021)
- Vânia Maia (2022)
- Sofia Savina (2023)
