= Vaughan Smith =

English journalist (born 1963)

- Born: Henry Vaughan Lockhart Smith; 22 July 1963 (age 63); Gillingham, Kent, England
- Occupations: War correspondent Restaurateur; Farmer
- Spouses: Sanela Djono (m. 1996–2001); Pranvera Shema (m. 2005–2022)
- Children: 5

Henry Vaughan Lockhart Smith (born 22 July 1963) is a British video journalist. He ran the freelance agency Frontline News TV and founder of the Frontline Club in London. The Guardian has described him as "a former army officer, journalist adventurer and rightwing libertarian."

== Early life ==
Smith was educated at Wellington College, Berkshire. Smith's father was a Queen's Messenger and a colonel in the Grenadier Guards. Smith was then an officer in the same regiment, serving in Northern Ireland, Cyprus and Germany. Smith captained the Army shooting team. Prior to setting up Frontline News TV, he was briefly a microlight test pilot.

== Career ==
In the 1990s, Smith worked as an independent cameraman and video news journalist covering wars and conflict in Iraq, Afghanistan, Bosnia, Chechnya, Kosovo, and elsewhere. Smith himself filmed the only uncontrolled footage of the Gulf War in 1991, after he bluffed his way into an active-duty unit while disguised as a British Army officer.

I applied for press accreditation to cover the Gulf War. I wasn't granted it. I had no chance as an independent and the mainstream news industry presented no opportunity for a beginner. But I was determined to cover the conflict and so I impersonated an active duty British Army officer and spent two months filming the conflict incognito. As a result, I managed to bring back the only uncontrolled footage of the war.

— Vaughan Smith, Across the wire, NATO Review.

During the '90s, Smith also ran Frontline News TV, an agency set up in 1989 to represent the interests of young video journalists who wanted to push the envelope of their profession. Frontline News TV was described by the BBC world affairs editor John Simpson as one of the "high peaks of journalism. Martha Gellhorn certainly thought so, and she was a pretty good judge". Its history has been detailed in a book Frontline: Reporting from the World's Deadliest Places, by David Loyn of the BBC.

During Smith's time as a freelance, he worked for many of the world's leading television stations and became an expert on, and advocator of, greater support for freelances operating in war zones. He has worked on journalist safety programmes.

As a freelance cameraman, he won, either individually or part of a team, 28 news awards (see below).

Smith has been shot twice, but escaped both times with light injuries. While he was filming the Serbian action at Prekaz in April 1998, a bullet lodged in his mobile telephone.

== Current activities ==
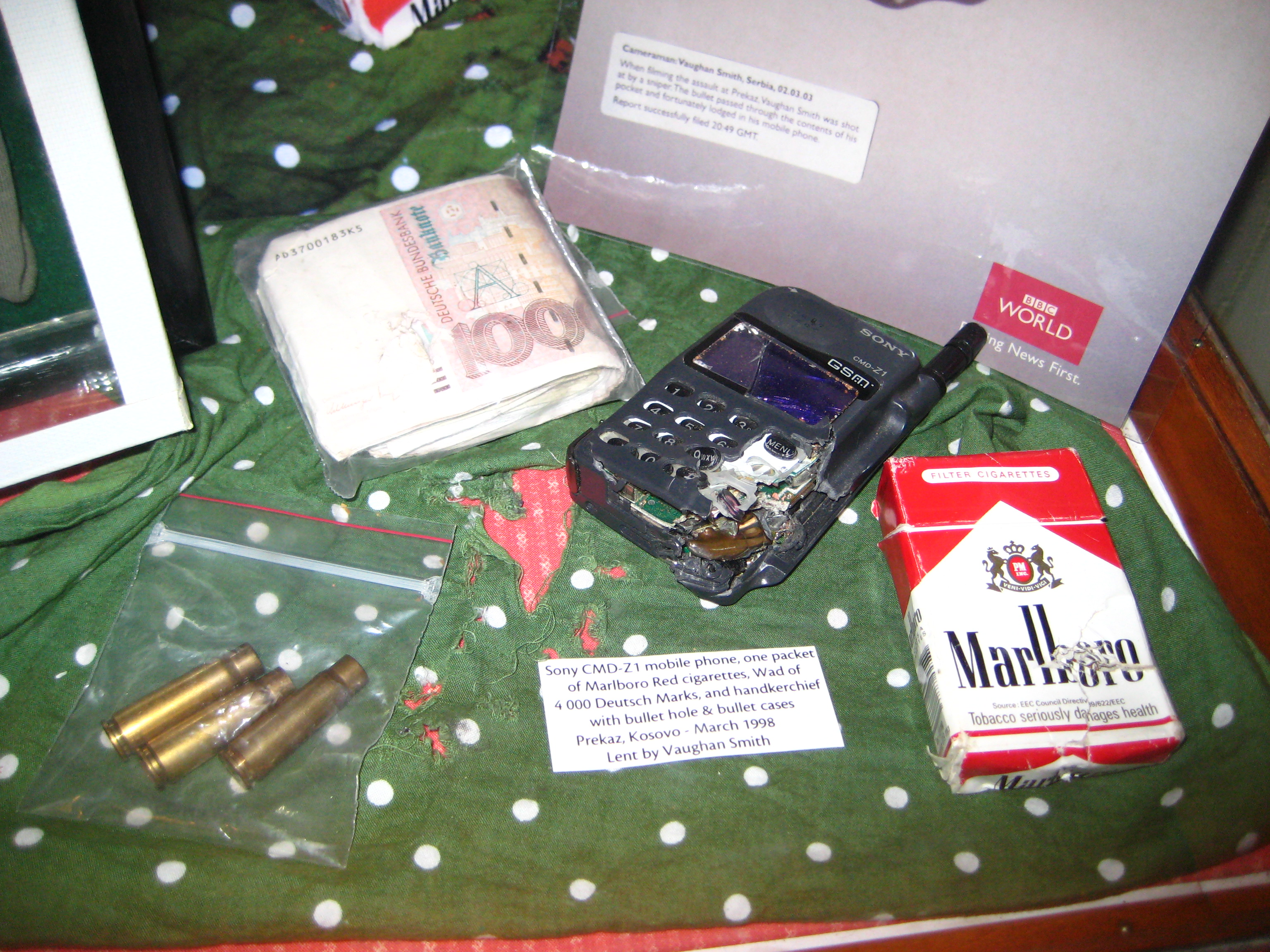
Vaughan Smith's mobile telephone in a display at the Frontline Club showing the sniper's bullet still lodged within. See: Attack on Prekaz for the event during which the bullet was fired. The banknote within view is at value of 1000 DeM, about €512.

Smith founded the Frontline Club in London in 2003 as an institution to champion independent journalism and promote better understanding of international news and its coverage.

Smith also runs a mixed organic farm on his estate at Ellingham Hall, in Norfolk, a "sprawling and elegant Georgian manor house near the town of Bungay" which has belonged to his family for more than three centuries. The estate is "[s]urrounded by 600 acres of woods and fields. . . . It has 10 bedrooms, a large dining room with a convivial circular table, and portraits of Smith's ancestors hanging on the walls." The farm specialises in pedigree rare-breed pigs, and provides the seasonal food for the Frontline Club and its public restaurant.

=== Julian Assange ===
In 2010, Smith gave refuge to Julian Assange, the founder of whistle-blowing website WikiLeaks, first at the Frontline Club and then at his country house.

He said of his decision to house Assange: "Having watched him give himself up last week to the British justice system, I took the decision that I would do whatever else it took to ensure that he is not denied his basic rights as a result of the anger of the powerful forces he has enraged."

"It was about standing up to the bully and the question of whether our country, in these historic times, really was the tolerant, independent and open place I had been brought up to believe it was and feel that it needs to be."

Having backed Julian Assange by offering surety in December 2010, he lost the money in June 2012 when a judge ordered it to be forfeited, as Assange had sought to escape the jurisdiction of the English courts by entering the embassy of Ecuador. At the Westminster magistrates court in October 2012, Smith plead on behalf of himself and eight other Assange sureties to keep their money, arguing they could not "meaningfully intervene in this matter […] between the Ecuadorean, British, Swedish, US and Australian governments."

== Personal life ==
Smith lives at Ellingham Hall in Norfolk, England, with his wife and children.

== Awards ==
As a freelance cameraman Smith won, either individually or as part of a team, 28 news awards. Most of them were for The Valley, a film which Smith produced about the Kosovo War, which remains one of the most acclaimed documentaries ever shown on the UK's Channel 4 television.

In 2007, Smith was the joint winner of a MediaGuardian Innovation Award and in 2008 a Rory Peck Award finalist for his film about Grenadier Guards in Helmand.

Giving a speech at the Rory Peck Awards ceremony, Smith strongly criticised news broadcasters for failing to give cameramen due recognition for their work. "I've been shot more times than I have been credited by the BBC," he said. "Without the recognition we deserve we spill our blood anonymously, consigned to the margins."

== Contributions ==
- Smith produced The Valley, a film about the Kosovo war of 1998/9.
- Smith produced an independent multimedia blog From the Frontline in 2007, reporting from Southern Afghanistan. The blog earned him a Guardian Media Innovation Award.
- Smith co-produced Blood Trail, a feature documentary which follows photojournalist Robert King for 15 years, nominated for the 2008 Toronto Film Festival. The film was renamed Shooting Robert King in 2011 for its broadcast in the BBC's Storyville.
- In 2011, Smith produced Blood and Dust, a film about life and death on a US Medevac helicopter in Afghanistan.
