= Martin Adler =

Swedish cameraman and journalist

- Born: 30 October 1958; Stockholm, Sweden
- Died: 23 June 2006 (aged 47); Mogadishu, Somalia
- Cause of death: Gunshot
- Citizenship: Somalia; Sweden
- Occupations: Journalist, Photographer, Cinematographer

Martin John Lars Adler (30 October 1958 – 23 June 2006) was a Swedish cameraman and journalist for Aftonbladet. He was a veteran, award-winning reporter known for his war reports and foreign coverage.

== Personal ==
Adler was born in Stockholm, Sweden, to a Swedish father and a British mother. He grew up in Västerås and became a journalist after studying anthropology in London. Adler was killed in 2006 while on a reporting assignment in Somalia. Adler is survived by his wife and two daughters.

== Career ==
Adler specialised in independent reporting from the world's most troubled countries, exposing poverty, human rights abuses and the fate of individuals in the midst of war and genocide. During his career, he worked in over two dozen war zones, including El Salvador, Rwanda, the Republic of Congo, Angola, Sierra Leone, Liberia, Chechnya, Bosnia, Afghanistan, Sri Lanka, Kashmir, Burundi, Somalia, Sudan, Eritrea and Iraq.

== Death ==
Martin Adler was killed on 23 June 2006 after being shot at close range by an unknown assailant during a crowded rally in the Somali capital, Mogadishu that was being held in support of the peace agreement. The gunman then vanished into the crowd.

== Awards ==
In 2001, he won the Amnesty International Media Award (news category) for his story on the kidnapping and sale of women in China. He was also awarded the Silver Prize for Investigative Journalism at the 2001 New York TV Festival. In 2004 he was named the Winner of the Rory Peck Award for Hard News for his work with "On Patrol with Charlie Company" in Iraq.

== Legacy ==
In 2007, the Rory Peck Trust inaugurated the Martin Adler Prize, which is awarded annually at the British Film Institute in recognition of Adler's "great talents as a journalist, filmmaker and storyteller". The purpose of the prize is to honour a freelance cameraperson, journalist, fixer, driver or translator for their role in reporting a significant news story, to "raise awareness of the value of the recipient’s work" and to "help them to progress in their career".

== See also ==
List of journalists killed during the Somali civil war
