= List of films about the Euromaidan =

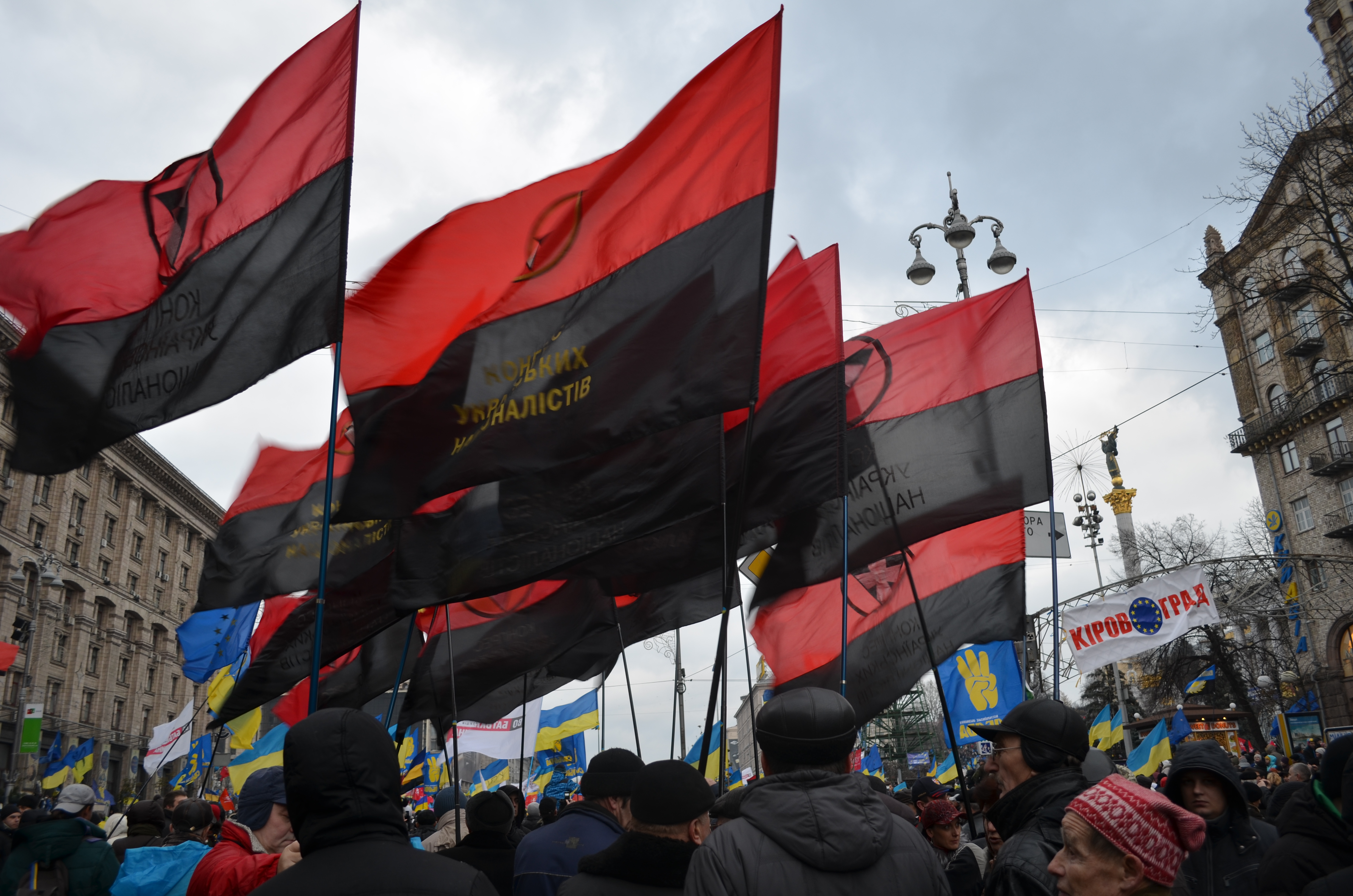
Protesters at Independence Square in Kyiv during the Euromaidan, December 2013.

The List of films about the Euromaidan gathers fiction films and documentaries dedicated to the Euromaidan.

Title	Original title	Language	Genre	Director	Year	Country
Museum of the Revolution	«Музей „Революція"»	Ukrainian / Russian	Documentary	Natalya Babyntseva	2015	Ukraine Russia
Winter on Fire: Ukraine's Fight for Freedom	«Зима у вогні»	Ukrainian / English / Russian	Documentary	Evgeny Afineevsky	2015	Ukraine United States United Kingdom
All Things Ablaze	«Все палає»	Ukrainian	Documentary	Oleksandr Techynskyi, Oleksiy Solodunov, Dmytro Stoikov	2014	Ukraine
Euromaidan. Rough Cut	«Євромайдан. Чорновий монтаж»	Ukrainian	Documentary	Roman Bondarchuk	2014	Ukraine
The Black Notebook of Maidan	«Чорний зошит Майдану»	Ukrainian / Russian	Documentary	Anastasiya Lysenko, Asya Khmyolova, Yura Katynsky, Anna Holtsberh, Anna Korzh, Anton Syomin, Anna Lysun, Viktoriya Zhukova, Olena Kosinova, Anastasiya Krysko, Vladyslav Rohalevsky, Anna Borysova, Alina Chernobay	2014	Ukraine
The Winter That Changed Us (cycle of 7 films)	«Зима, що нас змінила»	Ukrainian / Russian / Surzhyk / English	Documentary	Volodymyr Tykhyi	2013, 2014	Ukraine
Maidan	«Майдан»	Ukrainian / Surzhyk	Documentary	Sergei Loznitsa	2014	Ukraine
The Truth of Maidan	«Правда Майдану»	Ukrainian / English	Documentary	Andriy Solonevych, Dmytro Lomachuk	2014	Ukraine
Prayer for Ukraine	«Молитва за Україну»	Ukrainian	Documentary	Evgeny Afineevsky	2014	Ukraine
Maidan: The Art of Resistance	«Майдан. Мистецтво спротиву»	Ukrainian	Documentary	Antin Mukharsky	2014	Ukraine
The Female Faces of Revolution	«Жіночі обличчя революції»	Ukrainian / Russian	Documentary	Nataliya Pyatyhina	2014	Ukraine
Evolution of Dignity	«Еволюція гідності»	Ukrainian	Documentary	Olha Chytaylo, Artem Lahutenko	2014	Ukraine
Stronger Than Weapons	«Сильніше ніж зброя»	Ukrainian	Documentary	Yuliya Hontaruk, Volodymyr Tykhyi	2014	Ukraine
Cerise	«Вишня»	French	Comedy	Jérôme Enrico	2015	France
Day of Mourning	«День жалоби»	Ukrainian	Drama	Maksym Teteruk	2014	Czech Republic
Maidan Massacre	«Бойня на Майдані»	English	Documentary	John Beck Hofmann	2014	United States
Once in Ukraine	«Одного разу в Україні»	Russian	Drama	Ihor Parfyonov	2014	Ukraine
The Guard	«Гвардія»	Ukrainian / Russian	Television film	Oleksiy Shaparyev	2015	Ukraine
Through Maidan	«Скрізь Майдан»	Ukrainian / Russian	Documentary	Kateryna Hornostai	2015	Ukraine
Ukraine, the Masks of Revolution	«Україна, маски революції»	French	Documentary	Paul Moreira	2016	France

== See also ==
- Cinema of Ukraine
- 2014 Ukrainian revolution
