= Rory Peck =

Northern-Irish freelance cameraman in conflict zones

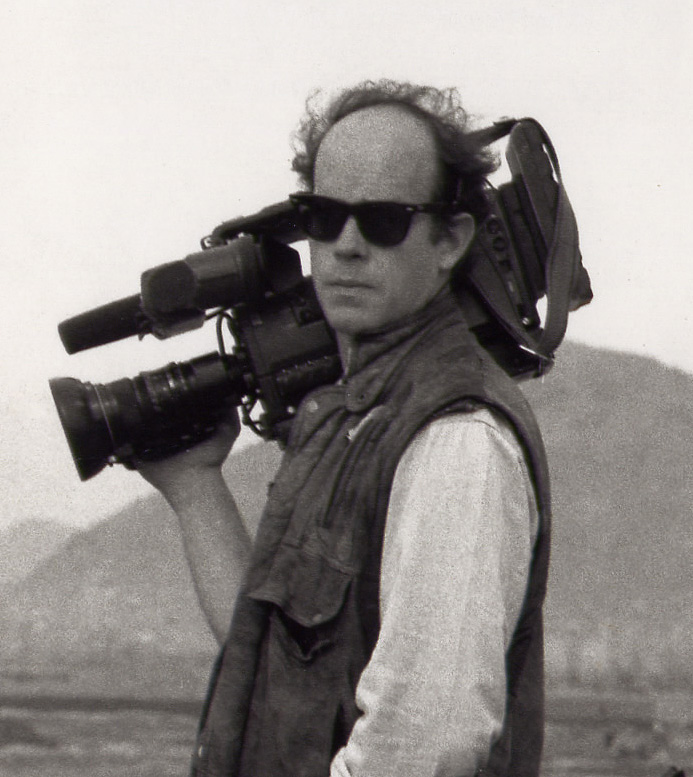
Rory Peck in Afghanistan

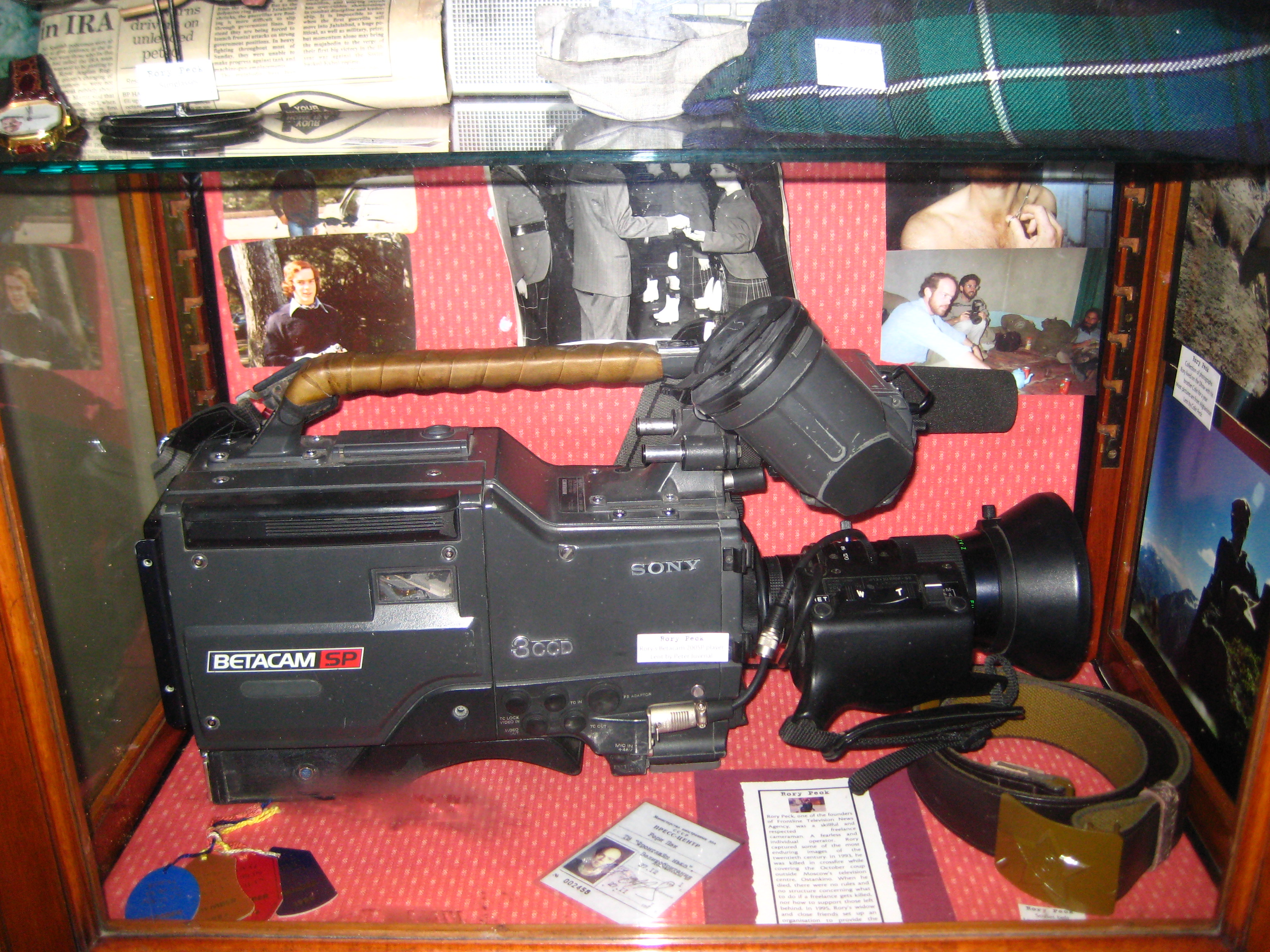
Rory Peck's camera and Russian Press Pass in a display at the Frontline Club

Rory Peck (13 December 1956 – 3 October 1993) was a Northern-Irish freelance war cameraman who was killed while covering the events of the 1993 Russian constitutional crisis.

== Work ==
Rory Peck covered the first Gulf War; the wars in Bosnia and Afghanistan, the many armed conflicts that followed the dissolution of the Soviet Union. He was one of the founders of the independent Frontline Television News agency.

Rory was shot and killed outside the Ostankino TV Centre in Moscow by Boris Yeltsin's loyalists (the Internal Troops' special forces unit Vityaz) while covering the Russian constitutional crisis of 1993. He was posthumously awarded the Order for Personal Courage by Yeltsin.

== Personal life ==
He was born in the United States in 1956, and grew up in County Dublin, Ireland. He was educated mainly in Dublin, and also briefly in Monaco and the U.S. On his father's side, the Pecks were from Glasgow, Scotland; his mother's family, the Titcombes, were from Maine and New York City. His maternal grandmother was from a French-speaking family in New Orleans of French and Spanish descent.

There were journalists and many writers in his late father Julian Peck's family including Rawle Knox (foreign correspondent for The Observer), Father Ronald Knox, E.V. Knox (editor of Punch), Winifred Peck, and Penelope Fitzgerald. After school his first interest was ocean engineering; he started at the Florida Institute of Technology, then transferred to Heriot-Watt, Edinburgh – leaving there for travel, then military training, and eventually journalism. He was gifted in mathematics and spoke Russian, French and Persian. He had one sister, Julia, a photographer, and one brother Colin Peck – also a TV journalist, known for his coverage of the first Chechen war and for locating the Marsh Arabs of southern Iraq during the US-led invasion of Iraq. Both brothers worked and filmed together in Moscow.

His first marriage, in 1981, was to Jane, daughter of Denis Alexander, 6th Earl of Caledon, and they had two sons, James and Alexander. The marriage was dissolved in 1987.

His second marriage, in 1991, was to Juliet Elizabeth Crawley. They had a daughter, Lettice. Juliet Peck (died 2007), with John Gunston, helped establish the Rory Peck Trust after her husband's death.

== Rory Peck Trust and Rory Peck Award ==
The Rory Peck Trust is a charitable trust that was set up in 1995 to administer an award named after Rory Peck. The Trust supports freelance newsgatherers and their families in times of crisis, and offers bursaries to freelancers to help them undertake Hostile Environment Training. The Rory Peck Award is given to camera operators who have risked their lives to report on newsworthy events.
