= Amelia Curtis =

British actress (born 1972)

- Born: 28 August 1972 (age 53); Stockholm, Sweden
- Occupation: Actress

Amelia A Curtis (born 28 August 1972) is a British actress who was born in Stockholm, Sweden. She is notable for having played the role of Viki Lovejoy in the final series of Lovejoy, a role that she took over from Amelia Shankley.

== Filmography ==
- Family Style (Short) (1993)
- The Bill (1994, 1996, 2010)
- Lovejoy (1994)
- EastEnders (1995, 2023)
- Cadfael: The Virgin in the Ice (1995)
- Pie in the Sky (1996)
- London Bridge (1996)
- Staying Alive (1997)
- Golden Years (Comedy Lab) (1998)
- The Nine Lives of Tomas Katz (1999)
- Janice Beard (1999)
- Kevin & Perry Go Large (2000)
- Understanding Jane (2001)
- South West 9 (2001)
- At Home with the Braithwaites (2002)
- FeardotCom (2002)
- Casualty (2003, 2022)
- P.O.W. (2003)
- Empire (2005)
- New Tricks (2005)
- The Royal (2006–2007)
- Love Soup (2008)
- Holby City (2008, 2012)
- Waterloo Road (2012)
- The Syndicate (2013)
- Emmerdale (2014, 2016, 2021)
- Doctors (2015, 2018)
- Love, Lies and Records (2017)
- Coronation Street (2017, 2020)
