= Richard Parry (director) =

Film director and writer (born 1967)

Richard Parry is a film director and writer. His documentary and feature films include South West 9 (2001), Shooting Robert King (2008), A Night in the Woods (2012), and Base (2017).

Parry has worked as a director, producer and cameraman in conflict zones such as in the former Yugoslavia, Chechnya, Nagorno Karabakh, Iraq, Afghanistan and covering the Great Lakes refugee crisis in Zaire. He was one of the original Frontline Television News cameramen / producers.

South West 9 was nominated for a BAFTA award.

== Films ==
=== Feature films ===
- South West 9 (2001)
- A Night in the Woods (2012)
- Base (2017)
- Cry Me a River (2018)

=== Documentary Film ===
- Exorcist of Woodgreen (1992)
- Bosnian Story (1993)
- Heartbreak Hotel (1995)
- Generation E (1997)
- Full Moon Party (1998)
- City Stories (1999)
- Gypsy Wars (2005)
- Shooting Robert King (2008)
- The Big Gypsy Eviction (2010)
- Dale Farm: The Big Eviction (2011)
- Billion Pound Base (2014)
- Hunted (2015)
- Unsolved (2016)
- Miranda Barbour: Serial Killer or Liar? (2018)
- The Jungle (2018)

== Awards and nominations ==
- 2001: South West 9 won "Best Music" category, British Independent Film Awards and was nominated in five other categories, including "Best British independent film" and "Douglas Hickox" for Parry's directing.
- 2002: South West 9 was nominated for "Carl Foreman Award for Special Achievement by a British Director, Writer or Producer in their First Feature Film in 2002", BAFTA
- 2009: Shooting Robert King won a Ron Tibbett Excellence in Filmmaking Award, Indie Memphis Film Festival, Memphis, TN
