= Raphaël Elig =

French musician

Raphael Elig
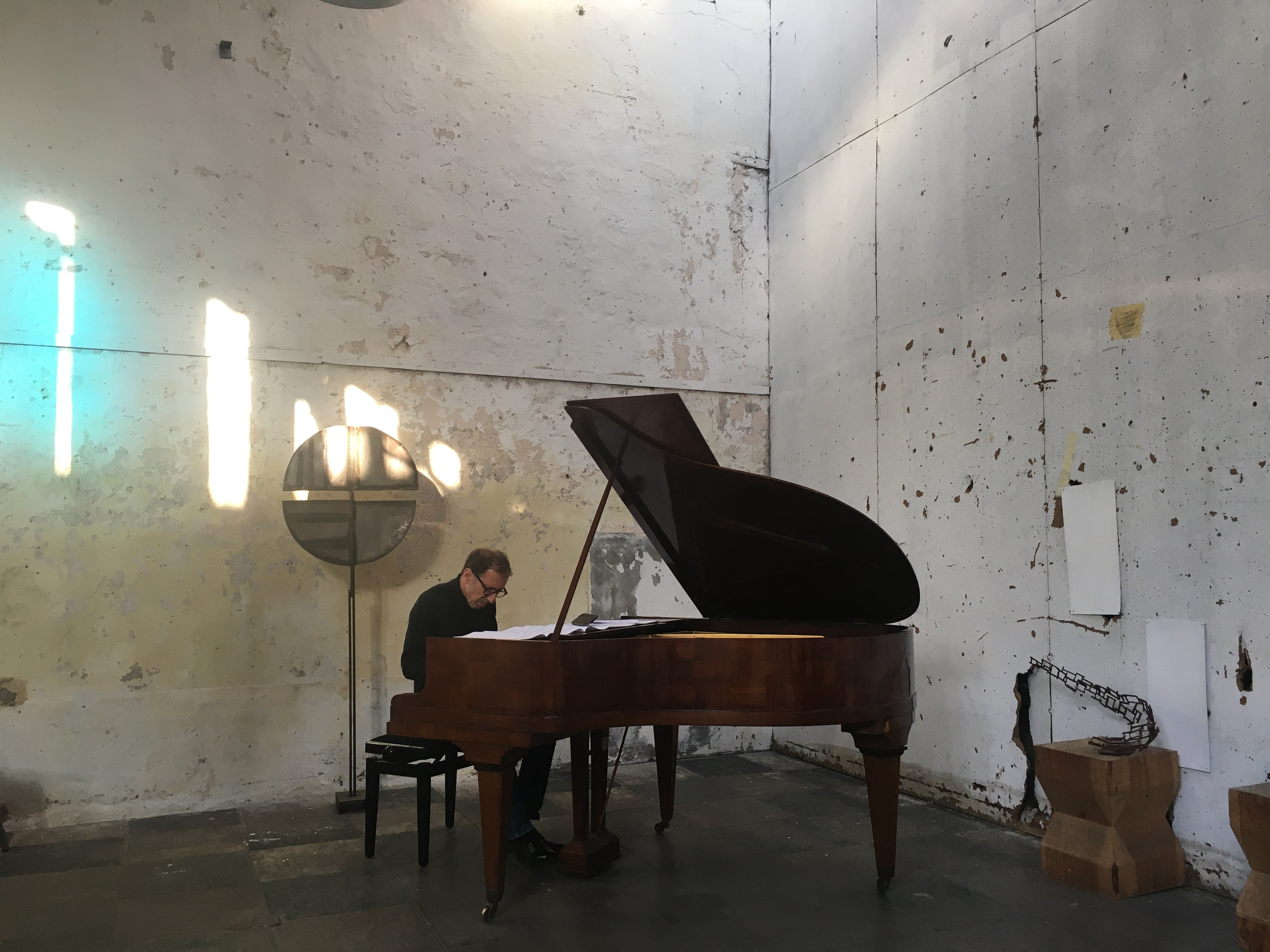

Background information
- Born: Paris, France
- Genres: Soundtrack
- Occupations: Composer, producer
- Instruments: Piano, Guitar, Computer, Synthesizer
- Years active: 1988–present
- Website: cargocollective.com/relig

Raphael Elig (born Raphael Eligoulachvili in Paris) is a French musician and composer of Georgian origin.

== Life ==
After classical studies at the École Normale de Musique de Paris and harmony, counterpoint and fugue lessons with Jeannine Richer, Elig followed the film music classes of Laurent Petitgirard. He completed his training by studying electronic music at the CCRMA, (Center For Computer Research In Music & Acoustics) acoustic and musical research centre of the Stanford University in California.

His professional career began as a composer, author and performer at EMI Group where he released two records in the early 1990s (J'me Fais du Bien and Les Garçons Aiment les Filles). In parallel he writes music for the theatre (Patrick Timsit, Clémentine Célarié, Sophia Aram, for the TV (Chic, Square Artist on Arte and Cash Investigation, Thalassa on France TV) and also composes advertising music for prestigious brands (Cartier, Vuitton, Air France, etc.).

He wrote songs for Gloria Gaynor, Yi Zhou, Sophia Aram

In the mid 90's, he joined the band Res Rocket, with English and American musicians on the Internet. The principle was to play music remotely and use the Internet as a vector of creation. The project was covered by many international medias (CNN, MTV, Canal+, etc.).

In 2003 he explored video and new technologies for a while to experiment with new artistic forms.

In 2019, he began recording his album Préludes - Avant le Jeu. For this piano project he finds simplicity and minimalism in the composition of his melodies. He inscribes this work in the tradition of piano pieces such as Schumann's Children's Scenes, Giya Kancheli's 33 miniatures, Chick Corea's Children Songs, "I wrote these pieces to express the simplicity as beauty, as represented in the mind of a child. "

It is this personal work around childhood and transmission that allows the meeting with the director Samir Guesmi at the end of 2019. He composes and performs the music for his feature film Ibrahim produced by Why Not Productions.

The rediscovery of the use of music in John Cassavetes' A Woman Under the Influence convinces him to record the music for the film on his study piano in his apartment, as an extension of his work on the album. There is a large place for silence, considering that this is part of the composition, the music and its breathing.

In September 2020, at the Angoulême Francophone Film Festival, Ibrahim won prizes including that for best music. "The film music that we have decided to reward takes the place it should take, it sublimates without ever caricaturing. We were very touched by this sensitive and naive piano matched to the emotions of adolescence." Prizes awarded on stage by singer Clara Luciani on behalf of the 2020 Festival Jury. In November 2021 the film Ibrahim won the First Feature Award at COLCOA the French Film Festival in Los Angeles.

His research in the field of music for images has always allowed encounters and interactions with the world of other artists.

== Selected discography ==
Raphael Eligoulachvili

- 2025 : The Piano Tuner (Raphael Eligoulachvili) (Relig)
- 2024 : Dreams (Raphael Eligoulachvili) (Relig)
- 2024 : Ady Steg (BO du documentaire) (Relig)
- 2022 : Préludes - Avant le Jeu (Raphael Eligoulachvili)
- 2021 : IBRAHIM Original Soundtrack Album (Why Not Productions)
- 2020 : Prélude No.7 (Raphael Elig)
- 2020 : Prélude No.3 (Raphael Elig)
- 2020 : Interlude Ma Nishtana (Raphael Elig)

Maintenant

- 2017: That's All We Know (Irradiant Hologram)

White Bamby

- 2014: You Bring the Night (Folistar)
- 2011: On The Sand (Folistar)

Haarpband

- 2011: Black Diamond (Recorder)

Raphael Elig

- 2013: Rue Mandar (BO) (Delabel)
- 2003: DVD by Numbers (Sony Music)
- 1989: Les Garçons aiment les Filles (EMI)
- 1988: J'me Fais du Bien (EMI)

== Selective filmography as a composer ==
=== Cinema ===
- 2025: The Piano Tuner a film by Nicole Giroux
- 2021: Ibrahim a film by Samir Guesmi
- 2019: Danse avec tes Maux a film by Touria Benzari
- 2016: TAAM by Sophie Bramly
- 2013: Rue Mandar by Idit Cebula
- 2011: Time Project, video installation by Gilles Bensimon
- 2010: L'An prochain à Bombay, documentary by Jonas Pariente and Mathias Mangin
- 2008: Dante 01 by Marc Caro

=== Television ===
- 2025: Chana Orloff a documentary by Richard Copans (Les Films d'Ici)
- 2024: Ady Steg a documentary by Isabelle Wekstein on France 2
- 2019: Le Grand Oral on France 2
- 2018: Escape News on France 4
- 2018: Téva Déco on Téva
- 2017: Museum Sound and musical design of the art channel
- 2013: Le Bureau des affaires sexistes (miniseries) on France TV
- 2012: Cash Investigation on France 2

=== Theatre ===
- 2023: Le Monde d'Après, music for Sophia Aram's One Woman Show, staged by Benoît Cambillard
- 2019: A Nos Amours, music for Sophia Aram's One Woman Show, staged by Benoît Cambillard
- 2015: Le Fond de l'Air Effraie, music for Sophia Aram' One Woman Show staged by Benoît Cambillard - Festival d'Avignon
- 2014: La Rose Jaune by Isabelle Bournat, music for Jacques Connort's play - Festival d'Avignon
- 2012: Crise de Foi, music for Sophia Aram's One Woman Show, staged by Benoît Cambillard - Festival d'Avignon

== Awards ==
- 2020: Best Music Award (Valois de la Musique) at the Angoulême Francophone Film Festival 2020 for Ibrahim by Samir Guesmi
