= Shooting Robert King =

- Directed by: Richard Parry
- Produced by: Richard Parry, Vaughan Smith
- Starring: Robert King, Vaughan Smith
- Distributed by: Revolver Entertainment
- Release dates: 6 September 2008 (Toronto International Film Festival); March 2009
- Running time: 79 minutes
- Country: United Kingdom
- Language: English

Shooting Robert King is a 2008 documentary film directed by Richard Parry. It documents photojournalist Robert King over 15 years and through 3 different war zones. The film splices footage from his time working in war zones with footage of him home with his family in Tennessee.

Shooting Robert King won a Ron Tibbett Excellence in Filmmaking Award at Indie Memphis Film Festival in 2009.

== Reception ==
The film holds a 100% rating, based on 5 reviews at Rotten Tomatoes.
