= A Night in the Woods =

- Theatrical poster
- Directed by: Richard Parry
- Written by: Richard Parry
- Produced by: Allan Niblo; James Richardson
- Starring: Anna Skellern; Scoot McNairy; Andrew Hawley
- Production company: Vertigo Films
- Distributed by: Momentum Pictures
- Release dates: 29 August 2011 (London FrightFest); 7 September 2012 (United Kingdom)
- Running time: 79 minutes
- Country: United Kingdom
- Language: English

A Night in the Woods is a 2011 British found footage horror film written and directed by Richard Parry. The film premiered at the United Kingdom film festival Fright Fest in August 2011. A Night in the Woods was produced by Vertigo Films and stars Anna Skellern, Scoot McNairy, and Andrew Hawley.

== Plot ==
The film follows Londoner Kerry (Anna Skellern) and her American boyfriend Brody (Scoot McNairy) as they travel to Dartmoor for a camping trip. Brody has decided to document their trip with his video camera. He grows irritated and jealous when Kerry invites her cousin Leo (Andrew Hawley), although Brody tries to hide this by acting friendly towards Leo. The trio stops by a pub, where they hear the story of a local legend called The Huntsman, who carves crosses into the foreheads of sinners before killing them.

Brody grows increasingly more jealous of Leo after seeing him and Kerry joking around, making him doubt Kerry’s claims that Leo is her cousin. Things grow more tense as he confronts Leo over footage of Leo sneaking into Kerry and Brody’s home. Brody attempts to catch Kerry and Leo by setting his camera up in the tent, which proves to be effective. It is revealed that not only are the two not related, but that they used to be lovers and Kerry lied to Brody in order to make things easier. Left alone, Kerry and Leo begin to have a fling, which is cut short when Leo hurts Kerry. He tries to apologize, but is rejected when he suggests that Brody is trying to replace her recently dead father. Leo then leaves Kerry alone in the woods.

Strange things begin to happen around the now alone Kerry such as strange noises and nooses tied to tree branches. Kerry is then chased into the woods by an unseen force, who knocks her out and carves a cross on her forehead. She manages to regain consciousness and returns to the campsite, where she angrily discovers the camera that Brody had set up in the tent as well as footage he had been secretly recording of her. This is further exacerbated by footage of her experiencing a nightmare while sleeping as well as a clip of Brody discussing plans to abandon Kerry in the woods so she can experience a solitude that he once experienced in exactly the same woods 10 years earlier. This infuriates Kerry, who then turns to the camera and threatens to hurt Brody. Her anger is cut somewhat short when the tent is violently shaken and she discovers a devastated Leo, all bruised and cut. Kerry tries to help him, but he attacks her in a fit of rage and chases her into the woods. She runs into a bruised and bleeding Brody, who convinces her that Leo is not himself and that they are being hunted by an unknown force. They try to find a way out of the woods, but Kerry fights with Brody after discovering Leo’s bracelet on the ground and suspecting Brody of wrongdoing. She manages to fight Brody off, killing him in the process but leaving her alone and hunted in the woods.

Kerry then discovers Leo’s digital camera on the ground, where she views a clip of Brody being attacked and dragged away by an unseen assailant. Frightened, Kerry tries to find a way out but is attacked, causing the camera to cut to black.

== Cast ==
- Scoot McNairy as Brody Cartwright
- Anna Skellern as Kerry Hastings
- Andrew Hawley as Leo

== Reception ==
Critical reception for the film has been mixed, with the film holding a 42% "rotten" rating on Rotten Tomatoes based on 12 reviews. The Daily Record gave A Night in the Woods two out of five stars, criticizing the film as a Blair Witch Project ripoff that "fails to provide any real moments of horror". Screen Daily remarked that the last part of the film was "shades a little too much into incomprehensibility" but praised the film's acting.
