= Cash Investigation =

French television news show

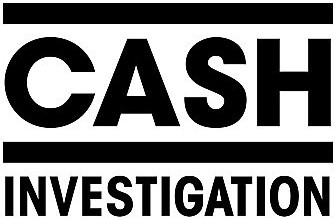
- Original broadcast logo
- Genre: Newsmagazine
- Presented by: Élise Lucet
- Narrated by: Jean-Pierre Canet
- Theme music composer: Raphaël Elig
- Country of origin: France
- Original language: French
- No. of seasons: 10
- No. of episodes: 54

Production
- Producers: Luc Hermann, Paul Moreira
- Editors: 2012–2013 Élise Lucet, Laurent Richard, Jean-Pierre Canet; 2012–2013 Élise Lucet, Jean-Pierre Canet; 2012–2013 Élise Lucet, Benoît Bringer; 2012–2013 Élise Lucet, Laurent Richard, Jean-Pierre Canet; 2012–2013 Élise Lucet, Jean-Pierre Canet; 2012–2013 Élise Lucet, Benoît Bringer.
- Running time: 90 minutes (seasons 1 & 2); 120 minutes starting season 3)
- Production company: Premières Lignes

Original release
- Network: France 2
- Release: 27 April 2012 – 15 September 2022

This article is a partial translation of the Cash investigation article on the French Wikipedia. The image and some of the information it contains were drawn from there.

Cash Investigation is a French television news show. It produces investigative reports in the financial and business space. The investigations cover subjects such as greenwashing, neuromarketing and child labor. They also take on the diversion of public funds, tax evasion, lobbyist influence, conflicts of interest and information manipulation by spin doctors.

Put out by the Premières Lignes ('Front Lines') production group, Luc Hermann and veteran journalist Paul Moreira, the broadcast operates in the tradition of such investigation news shows as 60 Minutes, Panorama, Frontline and Enquête ('Inquiry').

== Premières Lignes Prizes ==
- 2016 International Current Affairs and Social Documentary Film Festival 2016 - Scam prize for investigation
- 2015 Press’Tival - Gilles Jacquier Grand Prize - for The unspeakable secrets of our telephones

Prix de l'investigation DIG Awards

- 2015 DIG Awards - Prize for European Investigation
- 2015 Data Journalism Awards - top prize for LuxLeaks (ICIJ and Edouard Perrin of Cash Investigation)
- 2015 non-profit Anticor's Prize for Ethics
- 2014 Press International - Grand Prize
- 2014 Ilaria Alpi Prize for international investigation
- 2014 Best Magazine Les Lauriers de l’Audiovisuel (Audiovisual Laurels)
- 2013 Le Parisien - Best Magazine Star
- 2013 Media Grand Prize—CB News
- 2012 European Louise Weiss European prize, decryption category

== Broadcasts ==
Each episode of season 1 (in 2012) also contained, in its second half, a portrait of a whistleblower.

When the broadcast faced cancellation, viewers organized an online petition demanding its reinstatement. The show returned in June 2013.

Season 2 had five episodes. The report on tax evasion, broadcast in primetime following the Cahuzac scandal, was a critical and audience success.

In season 3 the show broadcast regularly in primetime on Tuesday evenings.

In July 2015, Premières Lignes put the program's broadcasts online on YouTube.

In season 3, the team for the first time produced an investigation specifically designed for the internet. Broadcast on Francetvinfo.fr, Ces entreprises qui vendent des systèmes de sécurité aux pires dictatures de la planète (These organizations that sell security systems to the worst dictatorships on the planet) completed the investigation outlined on the Business de la peur (The Business of Fear), broadcast of September 21, 2015.

France 2 ordered a fourth season from Premières Lignes, with the first numbers due to be broadcast in 2016.

Cash Investigation episodes are available online for a month after broadcast at pluzz.fr

=== Season 1 (2012) ===
Number	Date	Title	Director	Subject, comments
1	May 18, 2012	« Toxic fringues » ("Toxic Togs")	Marie Maurice	Low cost clothing, (Zara, Inditex); Globalization; Child labor Portrait: Erin Brockovich.
2	June 1, 2012	« La mort programmée de nos appareils » (The Programmed Death of our Devices)	Anna Salzberg; Wandrille Lanos	Programmed obsolescence Salt; Portrait: researcher Pierre Mèneton.
3	June 8, 2012	« La finance folle » (Insane Finance)	Irène Bénéfice; Olivier Toscer	High-frequency trading Poly Implant Prothèse breast implants, with Richard Abs.
4	June 15, 2012	« Gavés de sucre » ("Gorged on Sugar")	Edouard Perrin; Jean-Baptiste Renaud	The sugar industry in France; Portrait: Pablo Fajardo.
5	May 11, 2012	« Paradis fiscaux: les petits secrets des grandes entreprises » (Tax havens: The Little Secrets of Big Business)	Edouard Perrin	Tax evasion Portrait: The Yes Men.
6	May 4, 2012	« Marketing vert : le grand maquillage »	Jean-Pierre Canet; Martin Boudot	Greenwashing; World Wildlife Fund (WWF); Areva; Portrait: Jeffrey Wigand.
7	April 27, 2012	« Les vendeurs de maladies » (The Sellers of Illness)	Laurent Richard; Wandrille Lanos	Pharmaceutical industry Portrait: Shanti Senthikuma.
8	May 25, 2012	« Neuromarketing : votre cerveau les intéresse » (Neuromarketing: Your Brain Interests Them)	Benoît Bringer	Neuromarketing, SNCF, L'Oréal, plus the merchandizing of water (with Jean-Luc Touly).

=== Season 2 (2013) ===
Number	Date	Time	Title	Director	Subject, comment	Audience	Audience share
1	Tuesday; June 11, 2013	20h45	« Le scandale de l'évasion fiscale : révélations sur les milliards qui nous manquent » ("The scandal of Tax Evasion: Revelations on the Billions We Are Missing")	Valentine Oberti, Wandrille Lanos and Edouard Perrin	Taxes; Tax evasion	3.6 million	14.7%
2	Wednesday; September 11, 2013	22h15	« Foot business : enquête sur une omerta » ("Foot business: Investigation into a Code of Silence")	Martin Boudot	Economics of soccer	1.4 million	9.7%
3	Wednesday; September 18, 2013	22h30	« Les récoltes de la honte » (The Harvests of Shame")	Wandrille Lanos	Grande distribution, Corruption, Human trafficking	1.3 million	9.7%
4	Wednesday; September 25, 2013	22h35	« Diesel : la dangereuse exception française » ("Diesel, the Dangerous French Exception")	Edouard Perrin	Diesel, Filtre à particules, Health	1.07 million	9.5%
5	Wednesday; October 2, 2013	22h35	« Formation professionnelle, le grand détournement » ("Professional Training, the Big Detour")	Benoît Bringer	Continuing education, financement des syndicats	1.4 million	12.1%

=== Season 3 (2014-2015) ===
Number	Date	Time	Title	Director	Subject, comment	Audience	Audience; Share
1	Tuesday; October 7, 2014	20h50	« Industrie du tabac : la grande manipulation »	Laurent Richard	European Parliament; Cigarettes; Lobbying; French government	2.5 million	10%
2	Tuesday; November 4, 2014	20h50	« Les secrets inavouables de nos téléphones portables »	Martin Boudot with Jules Giraudat	Smartphone; Nokia; Apple; Samsung; Huawei; China	3.6 million	14.7%
3	Tuesday; March 3, 2015	20h50	« Quand les actionnaires s'en prennent à vos emplois »	Edouard Perrin	Sanofi; Samsonite (Bain Capital); Pages-Jaunes	3.2 million	

=== Season 4 (2015-2016) ===
Number	Date	Time	Title	Director	Subject, comment	Audience	Audience share
1	Monday; September 7, 2015	23h05	« Mon président est en voyage d'affaires »	Laurent Richard	French foreign policy, Diplomacy, Human rights	1,100,000	15.1 %
2	Monday; September 14, 2015	23h05	« Santé: la loi du marché »	Sylvain Louvet	Fee for service, Prescriptions, Social security, Pharmaceutical industry, Pharmaceutical lobby	1,100,000	13.7 %
3	Monday; September 25, 2015	23h05	« Le business de la peur »	Jean-Pierre Canet	National security, biometric authentication, Identity theft, computer security, video surveillance, Parafe	1,084,000	13.5 %
4	October 6, 2015	20h55	« Marketing : les stratégies secrètes »	Wandrille Lanos	Sale of personal data (collected through telemarketing, digital footprint, loyalty cards), targeted advertising. iPhone. Danone.	2,866,000	12.2 %
5	February 2, 2016	20h55	« Produits chimiques, nos enfants en danger »	Martin Boudot	Pesticides, cancers, congenital disorders, multinational corporations	3,120,000	13.2 %
6	March 22, 2016	20h55	« Salariés à prix cassés : le grand scandale »	Sophie le Gall	Posted Workers, Bouygues, SNCF Geodis	2,570,000	12.1 %
7	April 5, 2016	20h55	« Paradis fiscaux : le casse du siècle »	Benoît Bringer	Shell corporation, tax noncompliance, Panama Papers	3,568,000	17.1 %
8	May 24, 2016	20h55	« Climat : le grand bluff des multinationales »	Jean-Baptiste Renaud	Carbon emission trading, Engie, Total, LafargeHolcim, greenwashing	2,659,000	12.4 %
9	June 27, 2016	22h40	« Dopage : ça roule toujours »	Sophie le Gall	Doping in sport, athlete, Bernard Sainz	1,051,000	7.6 %

=== Season 5 (2016-2017) ===
Number	Date	Time	Title	Director	Subject, comment	Audience	Audience share
1	September 13, 2016	20h55	« Industrie agro-alimentaire : business contre santé »	Sandrine Rigaud	Nitrite, nutrition facts label, ANIA	2,764,000	13.3 %
2	October 18, 2016	20h55	« Marchés publics : le grand dérapage »	Loïc Tanant, Nolwenn Le Fustec	Public–private partnership, Microsoft, Pôle emploi	2,901,000	13.5 %
3	January 24, 2017	20h55	« Razzia sur le bois, les promesses en kit des géants du meuble »	Marie Maurice	IKEA, deforestation in Romania, Asia Pulp & Paper, PEFC, Holzindustrie Schweighofer	3,130,000	13.6 %
4	February 28, 2017	23h00	« Cash Impact : les nouvelles révélations des Panama Papers »	Benoît Bringer	Panama Papers	714,000	10.1 %
5	March 21, 2016	20h50	« Pédophilie dans l'Église : le poids du silence »	Martin Boudot	Pedophilia, priest, Catholic Church	2,175,000	9.8 %

== Credits ==
- Author - Jean-Baptiste Renaud
- Director - Jean-Baptiste Renaud
- Producers - Luc Hermann and Paul Moreira
- Image - Emmanrefuel Bach
- Montage - Myriam Milent
- Journalistes - Antoine G., Marion G.
- Editors-in-chief - Elise Lucet, Emmanuel Gagnier and Romain Verley

== Controversies ==
- In June 2012 the World Wildlife Fund sued France 2 to prevent broadcast of an interview of the NGO's management. The courts ruled in favor of France 2.
- On October 2, 2013, the program revealed that the French government had fined the training arm of Jardiland 3.2 million euros in September 2012. The issue was fraudulent transactions concerning hundreds of false training certificates issued between 2007 and 2011. The certificates allowed them to illegally receive subsidies from professional training organizations. Jardiland announced it would bring a defamation suit against France Télévisions, publicly accusing the Cash investigation report of presenting false information. In April 2015 more than a year later, Jardiland withdrew its suit.
- In 2015, Rachida Dati criticized the broadcast for the questions it raised about a possible link between Rachida Dati and the Engie corporation (formerly GDF-Suez).
- In 2015, Élise Lucet took part in a demonstration by the collective named "Informer n’est pas un délit" (Informing is not a crime) against a proposed French law defining trade secrets an amendment to the Loi pour la croissance, l'activité et l'égalité des chances économiques (Law for growth, activity and equality of economic opportunity), known as the "Loi Macron". She opposed the measure because it would hamper the production of broadcasts like Cash investigation. A book was scheduled for publication in 2015
- After the February 2, 2016 broadcast of Produits chimiques, nos enfants en danger (Chemical products, our children in danger), the Association française pour l'information scientifique (AFIS) (French Association for Scientific Information) issued a press release claiming that the documentary misled viewers. It cited the transformation of the summary of the European Food Safety Authority, which said: "Plus de 97 % des aliments contiennent des résidus de pesticides dans les limites légales dont 54.6% ne contiennent aucun résidu détectable" (More than 97% of foods contain pesticide residues within legal limits; 54.6 of these contain no detectable trace), into "Plus de 97 % des aliments contiennent des résidus de pesticides" (More than 97% of foods contain pesticide residues). Several weeks later AFIS returned to the subject, in a more detailed article, Comment les téléspectateurs ont été abusés par 'Cash Investigation'. The disputed number is cited once at the beginning of the episode.
