= Ellingham Hall, Norfolk =

Historic building in England

Ellingham Hall
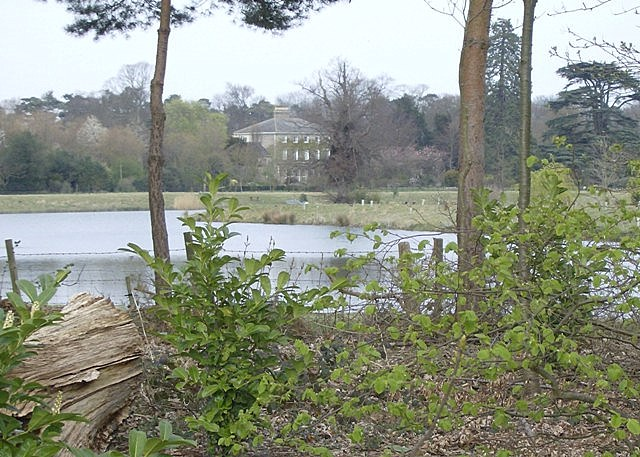

- Location within Norfolk

General information
- Type: Country house
- Architectural style: Georgian
- Location: Ellingham, Norfolk, United Kingdom
- Coordinates: 52.482431°N 1.473023°E
- Owner: Vaughan Smith

Ellingham Hall is a historic country house in the English county of Norfolk, near the town of Bungay, about 120 miles (190 km) northeast of London. It is located just north of the border with Suffolk and is sometimes misdescribed as lying in that county. It is situated in 600 acres (240 ha) of countryside in the Waveney Valley just outside the village of Ellingham.

== Description ==
Built from grey brick in the 18th century during the Georgian period, Ellingham Hall is a three-storey building with five bays, a large central doorway and ten bedrooms. It was modified in the Victorian period with the addition of a large window on either side with four rounded windows and parapet. Two bay wings stand on either side of the main building, standing two and a half stories high, with ground floor windows set in blank arches. At the rear is a Victorian porte-cochère set on Ionic columns.

== Ownership ==
The hall was bought in 1799 by the Reverend William Johnson (d. 1807) from the trustees of Michael Hicks Beach. At the time the surrounding estate was common land for the village of Ellingham, but Johnson was granted Parliamentary permission for its enclosure in 1806. It passed to his daughter Maria and her husband Henry Smith, who laid out a park in the estate and probably rebuilt the hall at around this time.

Colonel John Smith of the 2nd Madras Light Cavalry inherited the hall in 1846 after Maria's death. A keen hunter, Smith brought back to Ellingham Hall the remains of six of the 99 tigers he is said to have shot during his tour of duty in India. Whilst serving in India, Colonel John Smith re-discovered the Ajanta Caves which are now a UNESCO World Heritage Site.

Ellingham Hall is currently owned by Vaughan Smith, former British Army officer (Grenadier Guards), journalist and founder of the Frontline Club in London. The estate is the site of a large organic farm managed by Smith himself along with two employees. The produce is served in the Frontline Club in its public restaurant. The estate also offers game shooting. The Smiths have run a shoot on the estate for at least four generations; Vaughan Smith himself hosts the events, saying that he is "partial to shooting", following in the footsteps of his equally enthusiastic father and grandfather.

=== Scandal ===
The Hall was also the setting for the August 1887 "Hughes-Hallett Scandal" between Francis Hughes-Hallett and Lady Beatrice Selwyn (Hughes-Hallett's step-daughter and Henry Smith's niece).

=== Refuge ===
In December 2010, Ellingham Hall became a refuge for WikiLeaks founder Julian Assange, who was released on bail on condition that he stayed at a fixed address – namely Ellingham Hall, which Smith offered as a temporary place of residence for Assange. The bail conditions were jokingly referred to as "mansion arrest" by one of Assange's lawyers. Assange remained at Ellingham until December 2011.
