= South West 9 =

2001 film by Richard Parry

- DVD cover art
- Directed by: Richard Parry
- Written by: Stephen North; Richard Parry
- Produced by: Allan Niblo
- Starring: Wil Johnson; Stuart Laing; Mark Letheren; Amelia Curtis; Orlessa Edwards; Nicola Stapleton; Frank Harper
- Cinematography: Graham Fowler
- Edited by: Christine Pancott
- Production companies: Fruit Salad Films; Irish Screen
- Release date: October 12, 2001
- Running time: 90 minutes
- Country: United Kingdom
- Language: English

South West 9 is a 2001 British film about the Brixton rave scene. It was written and directed by Richard Parry.

South West 9 was nominated for a BAFTA award and won "Best Music" category at the British Independent Film Awards.

== Premise ==
South West 9 takes place in the 24 hours before a shooting at a Brixton rave. It combines themes of drugs, race, class, religion, and music in the multicultural melting pot that is South London.

== Cast ==
- Wil Johnson as Freddy
- Stuart Laing as Jake
- Mark Letheren as Mitch
- Amelia Curtis as Kat
- Orlessa Edwards as Helen
- Nicola Stapleton as Sal
- Frank Harper as Douser
- Zebida Gardener-Sharper as Rafaela
- Jenny Jules as Angel
- Kika Mirylees as Annie
- Jay Simpson as Elf
- Stephen Lord as Fazer
- Leon Herbert as Isi
- Robbie Gee as Jel
- Ellen Thomas as Mrs. Ashware
- Roshan Seth as Ravi

== Awards and nominations ==
- 2001: Won "Best Music" category, British Independent Film Awards and was nominated in five other categories, including "Best British independent film" and "Douglas Hickox" for Parry's directing.
- 2001: Won "Best New European director" at Odense International Film Festival, Odense, Denmark
- 2002: Nominated for "Carl Foreman Award for Special Achievement by a British Director, Writer or Producer in their First Feature Film in 2002", BAFTA

== See also ==
- Human Traffic
- Groove
- Go
