= Rory Peck Award =

Award for freelance camera operators risking their lives to report from conflict zones

The Rory Peck Award is an award given to freelance camera operators who have risked their lives to report on newsworthy events. It was set up in 1995 and is named after the Northern Irish freelance cameraman Rory Peck, who was killed while reporting on the siege of the Moscow White House in 1993. The award is organised by The Rory Peck Trust. Both were set up in 1995 by Peck's widow Juliet Peck and his friend John Gunston, in order to provide support and help to freelancers. The Rory Peck Trust is now an internationally recognized organization that supports freelancers' rights and enables them to work safely.

== Categories ==
The Rory Peck Award is currently awarded in the following categories:

- The Rory Peck Award for News
- The Rory Peck Award for News Features
- The Sony Impact Award for Current Affairs

The awards honour individual initiative and journalistic integrity as well as the quality of the camera work.

Since 2007, the Martin Adler Prize has also been awarded to honour a freelance newsgatherer for their role in reporting a significant news story, to raise awareness of the value of the recipient's work, and to enable them to progress in their career.

== Recent recipients ==
=== 2010 ===
- Roger Arnold, Red Shirts Protest, Rory Peck Award for News
- Najibullah Quraishi, Behind Enemy Lines, Rory Peck Award for Features
- Nick Read, The Slumdog Children of Mumbai, Sony Professional Impact Award
- Arturo Perez, Martin Adler Prize

=== 2011 ===
- Ahmed Bahaddou, Rebels in Western Libya, Rory Peck Award for News
- Abdallah Omeish, Libya: Through the Fire, Rory Peck Award for Features
- Jezza Neumann, Zimbabwe's Forgotten Children, Sony Professional Impact Award
- Suliman Ali Sway & Osama Alfitori, Martin Adler Prize

=== 2012 ===
- Mani, Horror in Homs, Rory Peck Award for News
- Alberto Arce & Ricardo Villanova, Misrata: Victory or Death, Rory Peck Award for Features
- Daniel Bogado, Terror in Sudan, Sony Professional Impact Award
- Al Mughira Al Sharif & Ghassan Ibraheem, Martin Adler Prize

=== 2013 ===
- Aris Roussinos, Ground Zero Mali: The Battle of Gao, Rory Peck Award for News
- Olly Lambert, Syria: Across the Lines, Rory Peck Award for Features
- Soumen Guha and Dipak Chandra Sutradhar, Hazaribagh: Toxic Leather, Sony Impact Award
- Idrak Abbasov, Martin Adler Prize

=== 2014 ===
- Pacóme Pabandji, CAR: Descent Into Chaos, Rory Peck Award for News.
- Team Mindeulle (Kim Dong-Cheul and Lee Hoon and others), North Korea: Life Inside the Secret State, Rory Peck Award for Features.
- Ben Steele, Hunted, Sony Impact Award.
- Khaled Abu Ghali, Martin Adler Prize.

=== 2015 ===
- Zein Al-Rifai, Aleppo: Life in Ruins, Rory Peck Award for News.
- Zmnako Ismael, On the Road with Yazidis Fleeing Islamic State, Rory Peck Award for News Features.
- Haider Ali, Pakistan’s Hidden Shame, Sony Impact Award for Current Affairs.
- Hassan Ashwor, Martin Adler Prize.

=== 2016 ===
- Will Vassilopoulos, Fear and Desperation: Refugees and Migrants Pour into Greece, Rory Peck Award for News.
- Marco Salustro, Libya's Migrant Trade: Europe or Die, Rory Peck Award for News Features.
- Marcel Mettelsiefen, Children on the Frontline: The Escape, Sony Impact Award for Current Affairs.
- Angel Istek Alcu, Martin Adler Prize.

=== 2017 ===
- Waad Al Kateab, Inside Aleppo: The Last Hospital Rory Peck Award for News
- Olivier Sarbil, Battle for Mosul, Rory Peck Award for News Features.
- Siraj Al Deen Al Omar, Mojahed Abo Al Jood, Basim Ayyoubi and Ahmad Hashisho, Goodbye Aleppo, Sony Impact Award for Current Affairs.
- Minzayar Oo, Martin Adler Prize.

=== 2018 ===
- Mikel Konate, Rescue Mission in the Mediterranean Sea, Rory Peck Award for News.
- Roopa Gogineni, The Rebel Puppeteers of Sudan, Rory Peck Award for News Features.
- Deeyah Khan and Darin Prindle, White Right: Meeting the Enemy, Sony Impact Award for Current Affairs.
- Daphne Caruana Galizia, Martin Adler Prize.

=== 2019 ===
- Luis Sequeira, Makeshift mortars vs bare bullets as Nicaragua resists an authoritarian regime, Rory Peck Award for News.
- Peter Murimi, Suicide Stories: Are Kenya’s Men in Crisis?, Rory Peck Award for News Features.
- Martin Boudot and Mathias Denizo, Paraguay: Poisoned Fields, Sony Impact Award for Current Affairs.
- Mais Al-Bayaa, Martin Adler Prize.

=== 2020 ===
- Guillermo Galdos, Poor forced to collect Covid corpses for work in Peru, Rory Peck Award for News.
- Ramon Campos & Alejandro Bernal, In Enemy Territory, Rory Peck Award for News Features.
- Sasha Joelle Achilli, Italy’s Frontline: A Doctor’s Diary, Sony Impact Award for Current Affairs.
- Maha Hussaini, Martin Adler Prize.

=== 2021 ===
- Solan Kolli, The Cost of War: coverage of Ethiopia’s Tigray conflict, Rory Peck Award for News.
- Brent E. Huffman, Uyghurs Who Fled China Now Face Repression in Pakistan, Rory Peck Award for News Features.
- Joshua Baker, Return From ISIS: A Family’s Story, Sony Impact Award for Current Affairs.
- Riana Raymonde Randrianarisoa, Martin Adler Prize.

=== 2022 ===
- Bhat Burhan – How Remote Areas In India Are Getting Vaccines, News Award.
- Jamal Osman – Inside Al-Shabaab, News feature award.
- Yusuf Anka – The Bandit Warlords of Zamfara, Sony Impact for Current Affairs.
- Mohammed Alamin – Based in Sudan, Martin Adler Prize.

=== 2023 ===
- Jedidia Lalaina Andriamasy, Gaëlle Borgia, Caroline Brenière and Jeremy Martin – Hunger-stricken families in Madagascar forced to sell children, News Award.
- Shirley Abraham and Amit Madheshiya – The Great Abandonment: the extraordinary exodus of India’s migrant labourers, News Feature Award.
- Jessica Kelly – Under Poisoned Skies, Sony Impact Award for Current Affairs.
- Ahmer Khan – Martin Adlter Prize.
