= Frontline Club =

Media club in London, England

Coordinates: 51.5169°N 0.1725°W

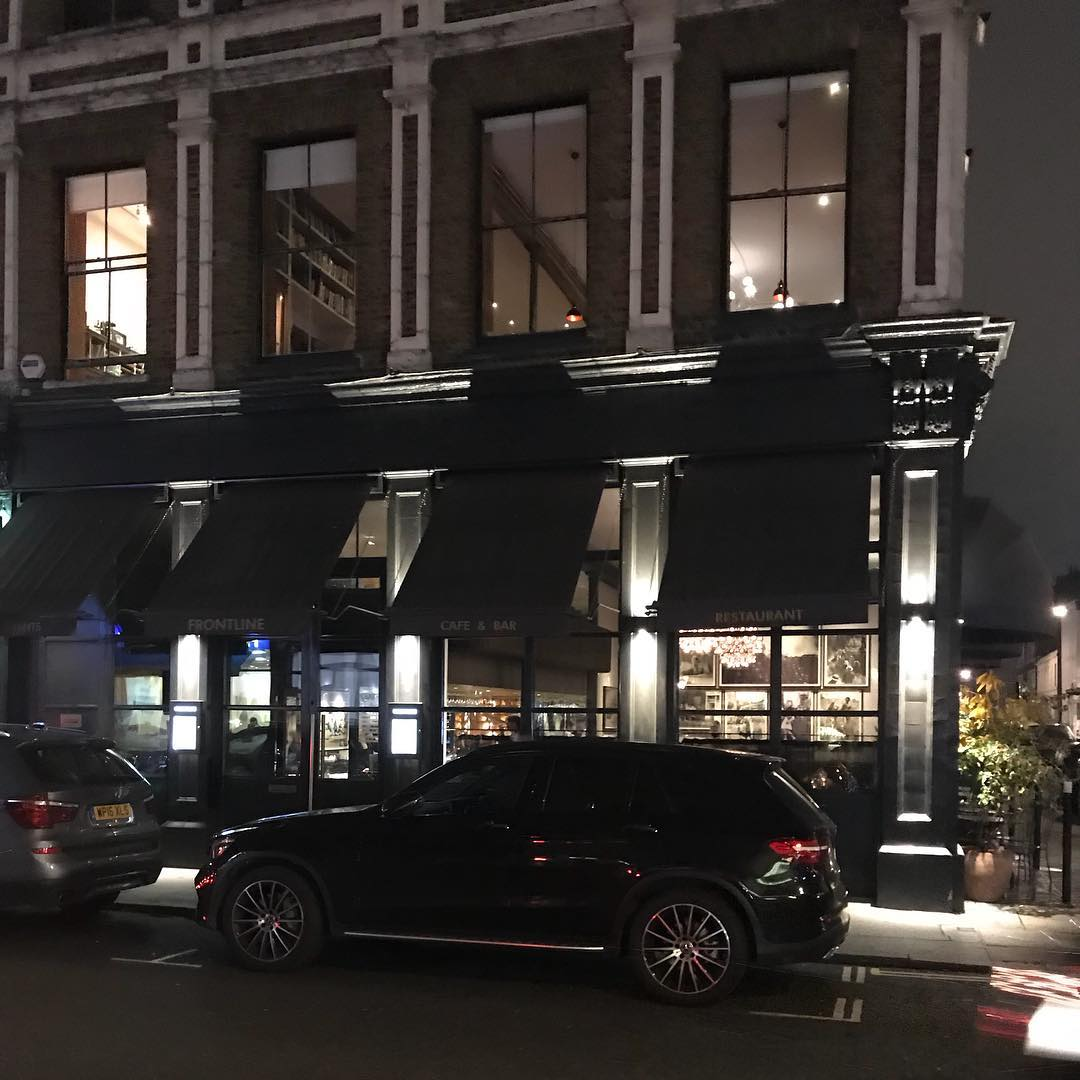
The exterior of the Frontline Club building

The Frontline Club is a media club and registered charity founded by Cameraman Journalist Vaughan Smith, located near Paddington Station in London. With a strong emphasis on conflict reporting, it aims to champion independent journalism, provide an effective platform from which to support diversity and professionalism in the media, promote safe practice, and encourage both freedom of the press and freedom of expression worldwide.

The largest event hosted by the co-founders was on the Impact of Wikileaks, with Julian Assange and Slavoj Zizek, moderated by Amy Goodman, Democracy Now.
Discussions, held most weekday evenings, are broadcast live. Past participants include John Simpson, Robert Fisk, Jeremy Paxman, Tim Hetherington, Nick Robinson, David Aaronovitch, Alan Rusbridger, Jeremy Bowen, Louis Theroux, Gillian Tett, Christina Lamb, Julian Assange, Jon Lee Anderson the late Benazir Bhutto, the late Boris Berezovsky, the late Alexander Litvinenko, and his widow, Marina Litvinenko.

The Club includes a Member's Bar, two lodging rooms and a discussion forum as well as an annex with 12 bedrooms available to members The club also hosts film and documentary screenings and organises training and workshops in such skills as camera operation and film editing.

In May 2011, broadcaster Louis Theroux said in an interview with the Evening Standard that the Frontline Club was his favourite London club.

== History ==
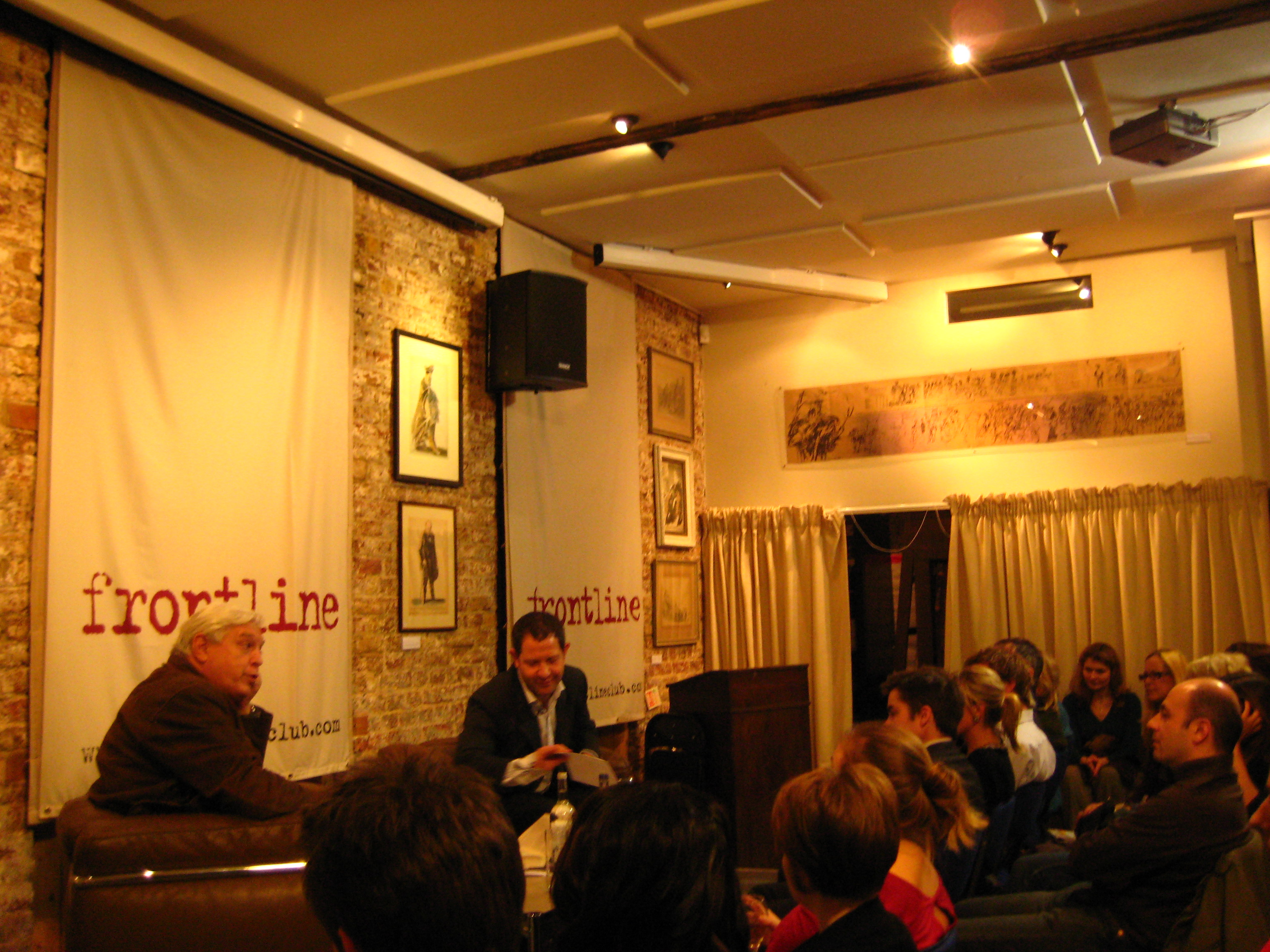
BBC World Affairs Editor John Simpson being questioned about his career by fellow journalists, October 2007

The Frontline Club opened in 2003. It was founded by Vaughan Smith, surviving members of Frontline News TV, a cooperative of freelance cameramen formed during the chaos of the Romanian revolution in 1989.

It specialised in war reporting for television. Vaughan Smith, one of two surviving founders of Frontline News TV, turned the operation into a club, offering a meeting place for those who believe in independent journalism, as well as to honour dead colleagues. It also aims to lobby for better support for the freelance journalistic community.

The clubroom has a display of relics drawn from the history of war reporting. Cabinets show personal items, some with shell still embedded, that have stopped a bullet and saved a journalist's life. The walls of the Frontline Club display examples of war photography and artwork.

In December 2010 Vaughan Smith and his family offered Julian Assange of WikiLeaks their home, Ellingham Hall, in Norfolk as an address for bail. Assange had been staying at the club for two months.

In 2019 the club launched Frontline Freelance Register for freelance journalists and reporters operating in war zones to help them with issues related to welfare, digital security and insurance. The register states on their website "The Frontline Freelance Register" (FFR) is open to international freelance journalists who are exposed to risk in their work and who adhere to our Code of Conduct. We aim to provide our members with representation and a sense of community."
