= Martin Boudot =

French journalist

Martin Boudot is a French investigative journalist, documentary filmmaker and producer based in Paris, France.

He is the host and producer of Green Warriors, an award-winning series of scientific investigations on environmental issues, broadcast on France 5, Al-Jazeera, Amazon Prime Video etc. He is the producer and showrunner of Planet Killers, a documentary series about the most wanted environmental criminals, aimed by Interpol red notices. He is also the director of "The Boss of Bosses" on Netflix, China's dissident Artist on Arte, Send in the Clowns on Canal +, The Cost of Arms on the European Broadcast Alliance partners (France 5, RTBF, ZDF, NHK, RTS, SVT, VRT, RTVE).

He has won the 2024 Lorenzo Natali Best European Investigative Journalism, the 2022 Louise Weiss European Journalism Award of the Year, the 2021 "Green Impact of the Year" of the World Congress of Science, the 2019 "Rory Peck Award" in the Impact Category, the 2017 Best European Current Affairs Program at the Prix Europa; the 2015 DIG Award, the European investigative documentary of the year. He is part of the 2018 Top 5 nominations for the Prix Europa of the European Journalist of the Year. He is among the 2015, 2017, 2022, 2023 and 2024 finalists of the Albert Londres Prize, the highest French journalistic distinction.

He is the author of Toxic Bayer, an investigative book about the pharmaceutical company Bayer, as well as Toxic, an investigation about harmful chemicals impacting the health of children; and a comic book "Les Enfants du Plomb", which won the 2024 "Eco-Fauve" Award of the International Comic Book Festival of Angoulême. In 2026, he presented parts of his work on the YouTube channel Press Room.

== Biography ==
Martin Boudot, born in 1985, graduated at the École publique de journalisme de Tours and specialized in broadcast media at Northern Colorado University.

== Filmography ==
• Putin's Secret Weapons co-directed with Hugo Van Offel, 90 minutes, 2025, broadcast on Arte, LCP, NHK, RTS, Moviestar +... This investigative two-parter reveals how Russia arounds international sanctions through a large clandestine network of weapons and spies. And how it is tying up various secret alliances.

• The Cost of Arms, co-directed with Hugo Van Offel, 70 minutes, 2024, broadcast on France 5, RTBF, ZDF, NHK, RTS, SVT, VRT, RTVE, Al Jazeera, Radio Canada. A documentary about the delivery of weapons to Ukraine, from the production in Europe to their reception in Ukraine.

• Planet Killers, 4X52 minutes, co-directed with Hugo Van Offel, 2023, broadcast on France 5 and on the European Broadcast Alliance partners. About environmental criminals.

•Green Warriors: The Toxic Legacy of Warfare, co-directed with Mathilde Cusin, 52 minutes, 2024, broadcast on France 5.

• Green Warriors: Flame Retardants, 52 minutes, 2024, co-directed with Mathilde Cusin, broadcast on France 5. About flame retardants.

• Green Warriors: Asbestos, Our Sick Schools, 52 minutes, 2024, co-directed with Mathilde Cusin, broadcast on France 5. About asbestos in schools in France.

• Green Warriors: Paris Metro, Air Alert, 52 minutes, 2023, co-directed with Mathilde Cusin, broadcast on France 5. About the levels of heavy metals and particles in the air of the Parisian underground network.

• Green Warriors: Forever Chemicals, 52 minutes, 2022, broadcast on France 5. This scientific investigation along with Dutch and French scientists helped change the law and regulations in France about the PFAS pollution in the country.

• Green Warriors: Children of Lead, 52 minutes, 2022, broadcast on France 5. With the help of scientists, Martin Boudot and his team investigated the lead pollution in Cerro de Pasco, Peru and in Évin-Malmaison, France. Their findings in children's hair, the soil and the vegetables made the French government to initiate a saturnism screening of 7500 kids around the former lead smelter factory of MetalEurope. The documentary received the Best Environmental Film at the Barcelona Human Right Film Festival.

•Green Warriors: Coal in the Lungs, 52 minutes, 2021, broadcast on France 5. A scientific investigation about the coal pollution in the air. Every year, 500,000 Europeans die prematurely due to air pollution. In Poland, nearly 75% of electricity is produced from coal. Rybnik, Poland, is one of the most polluted cities in Europe. The Green Warriors team cooperates with Tim Nawrot from the Hassel University to reveal that children here have 425% more black carbon in their bodies than children in Strasbourg. It made headlines across Europe and even attracted the attention of the Polish government. This documentary has received the "Green Impact of The Year" at the World Congress of Science, International Series Award at the Cine-Eco Film Festival In Portugal and the "One Hour Film Mention" of the "Festival International du Film d'Environnement"

• World's Most Wanted : Mogilevich, The Russian Mafia Boss, 50 minutes, 2020, Netflix. An investigation about the hunt for Semion Mogilevich, a Ukrainian-born Russian organised crime boss. He is described by agencies across the globe as the "boss of bosses" of most Russian Mafia syndicates in the world, and the FBI has called him "the most dangerous mobster in the world".

• Green Warriors: Paraguay, Poisoned Fields, 52 minutes, 2019, broadcast on France 5, Al-Jazeera, Amazon Prime Video, HRT, TVN, VRT etc. A scientific investigation about the impacts of the soy industry in Paraguay. The Green Warriors team partnered with Dr. Stela Benitez] to investigate about the potential DNA damages of children living next to the soy fields, exposed to pesticides sprayings. Their findings made the headlines of the Paraguayan media and was discussed by the Senate. In May 2021, the lobby of the meat industry in Paraguay tried to stop the broadcast of this documentary. For this documentary, Martin Boudot and his cameraman Mathias Denizo won the "Rory Peck Awards" in the impact category; the "Special Recommandation of the Prix Europa", The "Green Horizon Award" at the Braunschweig International Film Festival, the "Green Image" at the Green Image Film Festival of Japan, the "Trophée d'Or" at the Scientific Film Festival in La Réunion.

• Green Warriors : South Africa, Toxic Townships, 52 minutes, 2018, broadcast on France 5, Al-Jazeera, Amazon Prime Video, TVN, SIC etc. A scientific investigation about the gold mining waste in Johannesburg, South Africa. Confronted to the soil, water, animal hair and human hair samples made by the Green Warriors team, the National Institute For Occupational Health of South Africa called the results "unbelievable" and promised to intervene. The documentary was nominated at the 2019 Figra Festival.

• Green Warriors : Indonesia, The World's Most Polluted River, 52 minutes, 2017, broadcast on France 5, Al-Jazeera, Amazon Prime Video, Deutsche Welle, HRT, RTV, RTP. A scientific investigation about the pollution of the Citarum river by the textile industry. Confronted to the water, rice and hair samples made by the Green Warriors team, the Indonesian authorities declared that they were to change the controls of the textile waste industry. The documentary has won the Green Image Award at the Green Film Festival in Japan, the "Prix du Jury" at the Green Film Festival in Switzerland, The AgriSciences Life Science Film Festival award in Czech Republic. It has been nominated to Naturvision in Germany, International Nature Film Festival in Hungary, Mataslu Nature Film Festival in Estonia, Ekotopfilm in Slovakia, Green Montenegro International Film Festival, Montenegro.

• Church : Code of Silence, 120 minutes, 2017. A documentary for Cash Investigation about covered-up of pedophilia abusers within the Catholic Church, with 2,2 million viewers. The day after the broadcasting, the French Catholic Church expressed its "profound shame". The investigation also showed the role of Pope Francis in the Julio Grassi case, an Argentinian priest who was sentenced to 15 years prison for sexual abuses on minors. For the first time, Pope Francis was directly asked to answer on the alleged accusations regarding its role in the defense of Julio Grassi. The documentary won the 2017 best European Current Affair Program at the Prix Europa. Thanks to this documentary, Martin Boudot was among the 2017 finalists of the Albert Londres Prize.

• Toxic Chemicals, Kids in Danger, 120 minutes, 2016. An investigation on the pesticides effects on children's health broadcast on France 2 in the investigative magazine Cash Investigation. 3,1 million people watched it. The documentary was selected and screened at the One Earth Festival, the We Love Green festival and received an award at the Deauville Green Awards.

• The Real Price of your Mobile Phone, 120 minutes, 2014. Broadcast on French public national TV France 2, in the investigative magazine Cash Investigation, on November 4 with 3.6 million viewers. The documentary was the European investigative documentary of the year at the 2015 DIG Award. Thanks to this documentary, Martin Boudot was among the 2015 finalists of the Albert Londres Prize. The documentary also won "Le Grand Prix Gilles Jacquier".

• Send In the Clowns, a 90 minutes documentary about the power of humor, broadcast on Canal+.

• China: the New Dissidents, a 52 minutes documentary about Chinese artists censored by the authorities.

• Football business, a 90 minutes documentary about the football industry

• Green is the new black, co-directed with Jean-Pierre Canet, a 70 minutes documentary about greenwashing.

• The Yes Men Are Revolting, Martin Boudot was a cameraman on this movie.

== Books ==
• Les Enfants du Plomb, éditions Michel Lafon, 2024. A comic book telling the story of the "largest polluted zone in France".

• Toxic Bayer, éditions Plon, 2020. An investigation about the German pharmaceuticals company Bayer.

• Toxic, nos enfants en danger, with Antoine Dreyfus, éditions La Découverte, 2016. An investigation about the harmful chemicals impacting the health of children.
