= Frontline Television News =

Cooperative of freelance cameramen

Frontline Television News is a cooperative of freelance cameramen formed during the chaos of the Romanian Revolution in 1989. Founded by Vaughan Smith, Peter Jouvenal, Rory Peck and Nicholas della Casa. During the next 15 years, they went on to film some of the most memorable images of modern television, despite paying a huge cost. Altogether eight cameramen, some linked directly with Frontline News TV, others indirectly, were killed while working.

Apart from providing independent news coverage of major events, many members used their military background and knowledge of local culture in places like Afghanistan to navigate dangerous battle situations and obtain pictures few other journalists could obtain. They also pioneered some technical innovations, such as using small Hi8 cameras in the early 1990s, and live satellite newsfeeds in the early 2000s.

In 2003, Vaughan Smith, one of the two surviving founder members of Frontline News TV, turned the operation into a club in London aimed at offering a gathering place for those who believe in independent journalism, a place to remember colleagues that had died and a lobby to push for better support of the freelance community.

This became the Frontline Club, one of the leading media talking-shops in the UK today.

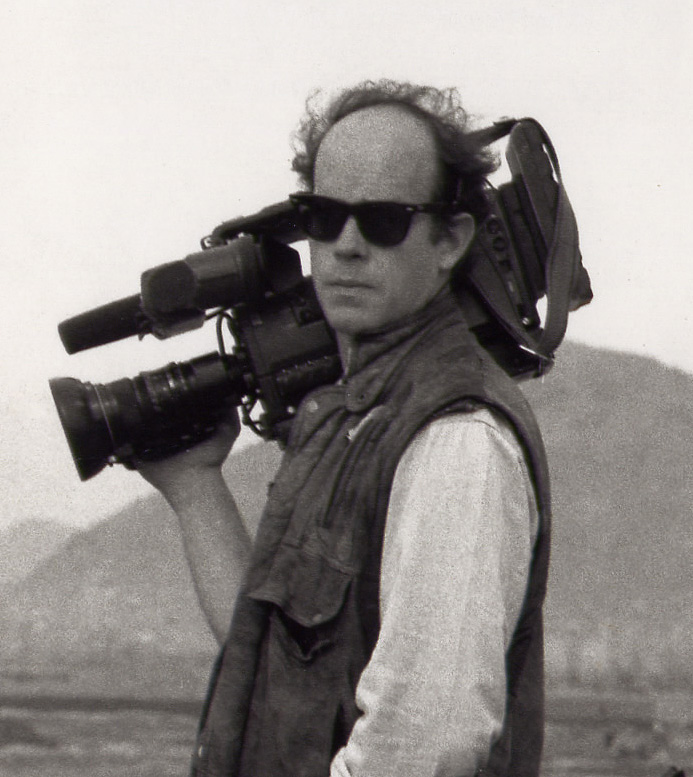
Rory Peck in Afghanistan

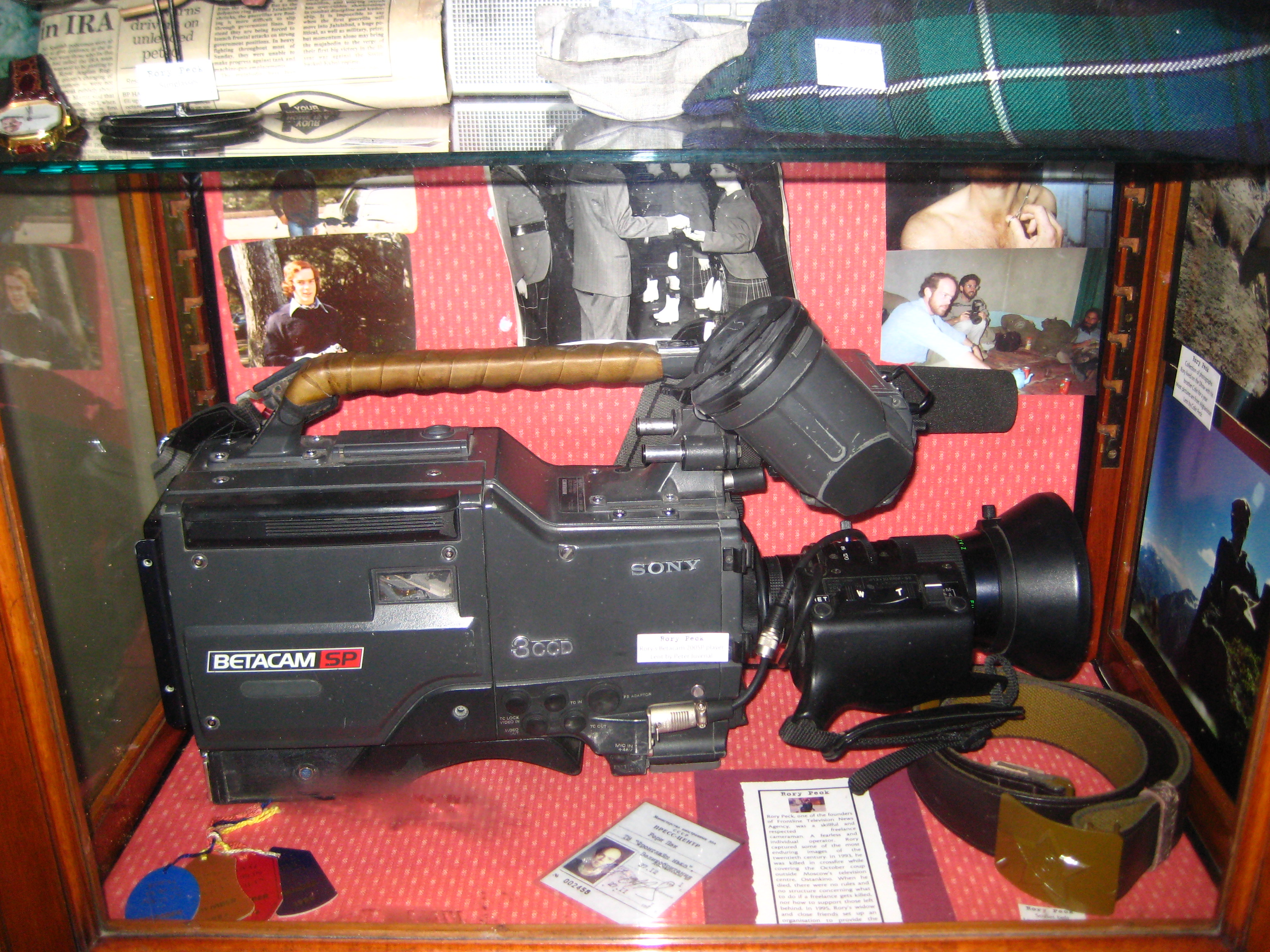
Rory Peck's camera and Russian Press Pass in a display at the Frontline Club

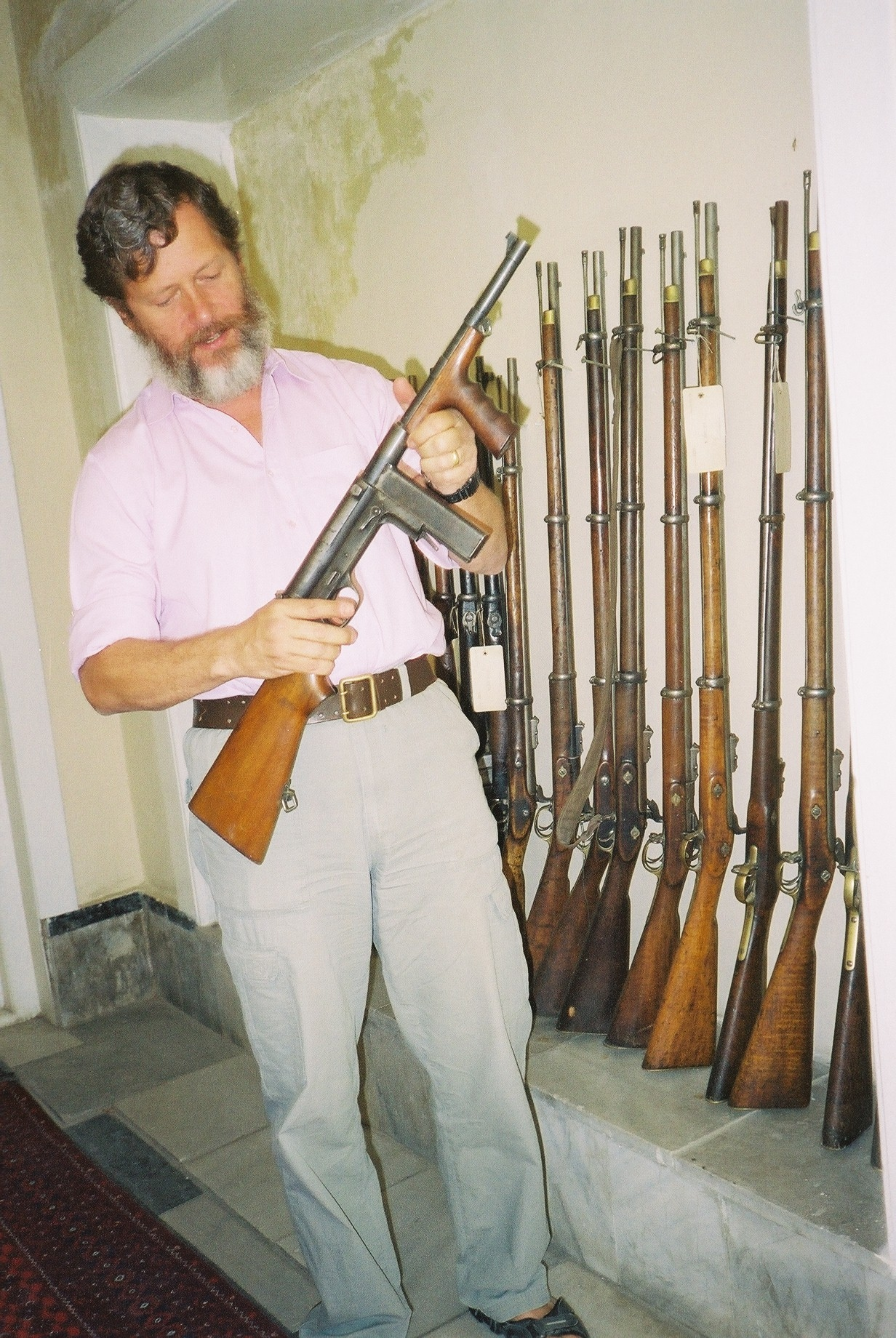
Peter Jouvenal in Kabul, Afghanistan

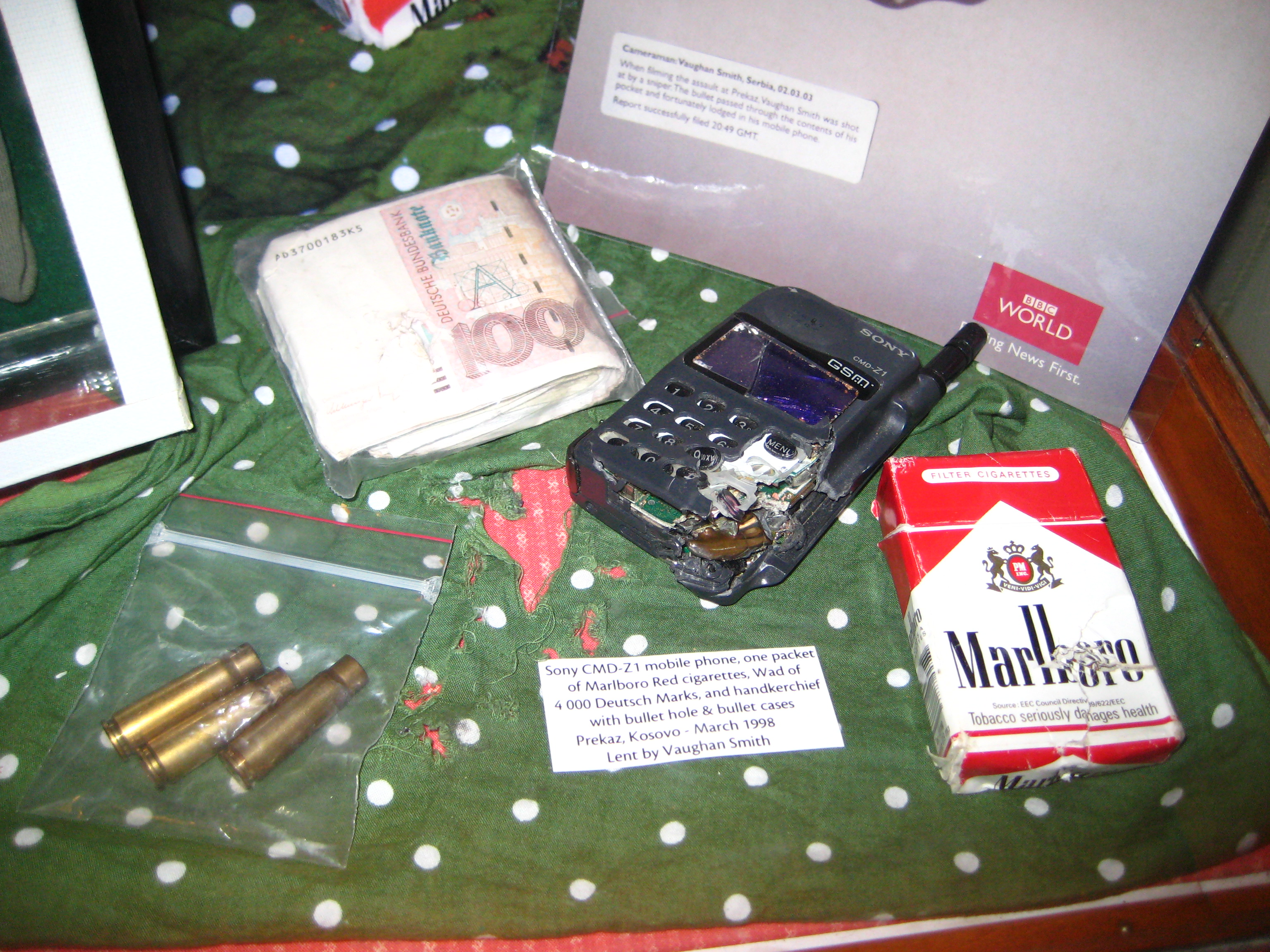
Display Frontline Club of Vaughan Smith's mobile telephone showing the sniper's bullet still lodged within it, which saved his life

== Frontline journalists who have died ==
- Nicholas "Nick" della Casa (1960–1991)
- Rosanna della Casa (1960–1991)
- Roddy Scot (1971–2002)
- Charles Maxwell (1952–1991)
- Rory Peck (1956–1993)
- James Miller (1968–2003)
- Richard Wild (1978–2003)
- Carlos Mavroleon (1958–1998)
