= Maha Hussaini =

Palestinian journalist and human rights activist

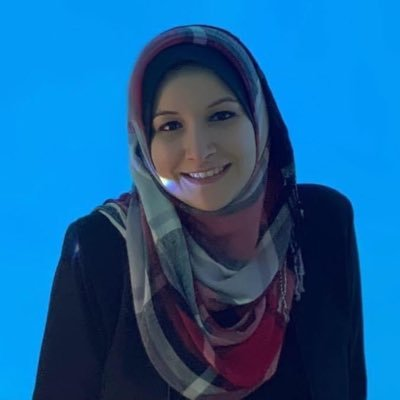
- Education: Master's degree in political science
- Occupation: Strategy director at Euro-Mediterranean Human Rights Monitor
- Organization: Euro-Mediterranean Human Rights Monitor
- Awards: Martin Adler Prize

Maha Nazih Al-Hussaini is a Palestinian journalist, human rights activist, director of strategies at the Euro-Mediterranean Human Rights Monitor in Geneva, Switzerland, and a member of the Marie Colvin Network of Women Journalists. She is a based in Gaza. She started her journalism career by covering Israel's military campaign on the Gaza Strip in July 2014.

== Early life and education ==
In 2013, Al-Hussaini obtained her Bachelor's degree in English and French Literature from Al-Azhar University in Gaza, and later graduated with a Master's degree in Political science from Al-Azhar University (2018).

== Career ==
Al-Hussaini has worked as a reporter in conflict zones, notably writing about human rights violations in the Occupied Palestinian territories.writes for international newspapers, most notably "Middle East Eye", "The New Humanitarian" and "Rory Peck".

Until 2019, she held the position of executive director of the Euro-Mediterranean Human Rights Monitor's Regional Office in the Palestinian Territories. From 2019 to 2021, she worked as executive director of Impact International for International Policies, based in London. In 2021, she returned to work at the Euro-Mediterranean Monitor as strategic director of the organization. As part of her work with the Euro-Mediterranean Monitor, she organises the organisation participation in the United Nations Human Rights Council. She has also served as a media contact for the organisation, being interviewed by multiple news channels and newspapers, including Al-Jazeera, Al-Arabi TV, Anadolu Agency, Al-Araby Al-Jadeed, and Kufia TV.

== Awards and recognition ==
In 2020, Al-Hussaini won the Martin Adler Prize for her work as a freelance journalist.

In June 2024, she was awarded the International Women's Media Foundation (IWMF) Courage in Journalism Award. However, after the conservative Washington Free Beacon published an article claiming that Al-Haissani had made Tweets supporting Hamas' attacks on Israel on Oct 7, 2023 and had shared a cartoon from Iran's International Holocaust Cartoon Competition, the IWMF announced it had revoked her award, stating that it had "learned of comments made by Maha Hussaini in past years that contradict the values of our organization.

== Published works ==
Hussaini has published several reports and articles, most notably:

- Middle East Eye – "The girl who showed the world the suffering of Gaza's children"
- The New Humanitarian – "One year on from Israel’s bombardment, Gazans still await help to rebuild"
- Al Jazeera|Al-Jazeera – "Disabled or dead... some victims of Israeli raids on Gaza will not return to school"
- Impact International – "Beirut explosion: the path to disaster"

== See also ==
- Rula Hassanein
