= Paul Moreira =

French journalist and documentary filmmaker

- Paul Moreira (centre) at the National Centre for Commando Training in 2005
- Born: 1961 (age 64–65); Lisbon, Portugal
- Citizenship: French
- Occupations: War correspondent, film director, journalist, screenwriter
- Awards: Prix du Livre du Journalisme (2016); Festival de télévision de Monte-CarloVoir et modifier les données sur Wikidata

Paul Moreira is a French journalist and documentary filmmaker. He is based in Paris, France. He has directed several investigative documentaries in conflict zones, including Iraq, Afghanistan, Burma, Palestine, Democratic Republic of Congo and Somalia.

== Career ==
Paul Moreira has contributed to the emergence of investigative journalism on French television. In 1999, in created the program "90 minutes" on Canal plus, a European television network. The investigations of his team collected several awards. Like "Escadrons de la mort : l'école française" by Marie Monique Robin. This film got the award of the political documentary of "Audiovisual Club" of French senate in 2003, best investigative film at FIGRA, award of merit from Latin American Studies Association. The investigation about the suicide of Judge Borrel proved it was actually a murder and contributed to reopen criminal investigations. Following the success of the show and at the request of the management of Canal Plus, he created a weekly slot dedicated to investigative documentaries: Lundi Investigation.

In 2006, Paul Moreira left Canal+ to create an independent TV production company, Premieres Lignes (First Lines).

Since then, he has been developing a line of investigative and comprehensive films on global issues. He works on assignment for various French channels: Canal Plus, Arte, France Televisions, La Chaine Parlementaire. His films have been broadcast in most European countries as well as Canada, India, Singapore, Australia, Japan, Russia...

In 2007, he published an essay on journalism, public relations, war reporting at the embedment age and perception management.

== Filmography (selected works) ==
2003

- "In The Jungle of Baghdad": Looting and chaos that followed US forces invasion of Iraq. (Canal+)

2004

- "Baghdad: War of bombs": the fighting in Sadr City in September 2004. (Canal+)
- "The Power of the Armed Rebels": meeting the young fighters who were challenging the Palestinian authority, among them Zakaria Zubeidi, head of Martyrs Brigades Al Aqsa in Jenin, then most wanted man for the Israel Defense Forces.

Award of the best feature story from the Club Audiovisuel de Paris in 2005.

2007

- "Iraq: Agony of a Nation": At the height of the confessional strife in Baghdad, an investigation on the roots of the civil war. (Canal+)

Best documentary at the International Monte-Carlo Television Festival and best investigative film at Festival International du Grand Reportage d'Actualités (FIGRA).

2008

- "Armes, trafic et raison d'état," a 90 minutes film on the flow of weapons pouring into Eastern Congo Arte TV, a French-German channel, co-directed by Paul Moreira and David Andre.

Investigative Award at FIGRA.

2009

- "Afghanistan: on the dollar trail", a 52 minutes documentary on corruption and embezzlement of humanitarian aid in Afghanistan.

Broadcast on Canal Plus, ABC Australia, NHK (Japan), Russia Today, Al Jazeera, TVE (Spain), Finland, Netherlands and others.
Investigative Award in FIGRA and selected for the first edition of Investigative Film Week in London.

2010

- "Burma: Resistance, Business and Nuclear Secrets": an undercover documentary in Myanmar that reveals how Alcatel-Shanghai-Bell, the Chinese branch of Alcatel, is helping the junta control the internet.
- "Coupables indulgences", "Guilty indulgences", how the Catholic hierarchy protects pedophile priests

2011

- "Wikileaks : War, Lies and Videotape" : an in-depth investigative documentary about Wikileaks.

First broadcast by La Chaine Parlementaire, the film was circulated worldwide.
Shown in the USA on Current TV and on Discovery Channel.

- "Bunker cities", a 52 minutes documentary about gated communities in Europe, Brazil and Iraq. (Arte)
- "Toxic Somalia", an investigative film about the toxic waste dumped on Somalian coasts with a rare access to pirates from Hobyo, children hospital in Mogadishu and Italian trafficking networks. (Arte)

Special Award of the Jury at Ilaria Alpi Film Festival

2012

- "Tracked : Investigating digital arms dealers", western companies selling tracking devices to middle eastern dictatorships, Syria and Libya.(Canal+)

Selected at the London Investigative Film Week in January 2013

2013

- "Big Tobacco, Young Targets", a documentary about tobacco companies targeting children worldwide. (Canal+)

UK Premiere at the London Investigative Film Week in 2014

- "Journey through an invisible war", a 60 minutes film on the low intensity conflict between Israeli settlers and Palestinian in the West Bank. (Canal Plus, Al Jazeera)

2014

- "Bientôt dans vos assiettes (de gré ou de force)", "Soon on your plates! (By fair means or foul...)"

"In fifteen years, GMOs have profoundly disrupted production habits in the agricultural world. Agrochemical companies like Monsanto have given birth to varieties of soybeans and corn that are more resistant to pesticides. Side effects are noted by breeders and farmers. In Denmark, pig farmers have seen the appearance of a new disease, yellow death, a gastric disease that kills 30% of animals. In Argentina, transgenic cultivation has increased the cultivable area by 65%. The residents of these farms denounce massive pollution from pesticides."

2015

- "Danse avec le FN",

"I wanted to take a dangerous trip to the heart of the National Front. I didn't want to investigate their finances, nor prove their historical lineage to the more moldy far-right. Others did it much better than I did. The risk I wanted to take was to get so close to their new constituents that I could, that I was going to be their buddy. The risk of empathy"
— Paul Moreira
2016

- "Ukraine The Masks of the Revolution", a documentary about role of extreme right-wing paramilitary groups in Ukraine during and after the overthrow of the Yanukovych government, and especially in the violence in Odesa in May 2014. FIPA (Festival International des Programmes Audiovisuels) included this documentary among its 2016 selections. The Ukrainian Embassy in France asked Canal+ to stop the screening of the film. The channel went ahead with the screening. Due to popular demand, the film was shown several more times on Canal+. The film was also translated into several languages, and shown in other countries, such as Italy and Poland.

2018

- "Inside the Russian Info War Machine", how Russia manipulates public opinion, undermines democratic governments and attempts to alter world events.
- "Digital Addicts", Child mobile phone addiction, brain development, long-term damage

2019

- "Chocolate's Heart of Darkness", Driving along the Ivory Coast - the region responsible for most of the production and export of cocoa - the filmmaking team encounter armed militias, a badly deteriorated forest reserve, and thousands of illegal cocoa plants. In one camp, a group of 40 immigrant men and children toil through the brush with machetes, engaging in a process that is both back breaking and risky. The children spray poisonous pesticides without wearing masks or any other protective gear. Beyond documenting the environmental and human rights abuses, the filmmakers attempt to hold corporations accountable for their complicity.

2020

- NETFLIX : "World's Most Wanted (Season 1, Episode 1): Ismael "El Mayo" Zambada Garcia: The Head of the Sinaloa Cartel"

2021

- NETFLIX : "The Fugitive : the strange case of Carlos Ghosn", executive producer of a 90 minutes feature bio-pic documentary on Carlos Ghosn, CEO of Renault-Nissan.

2022

- "In The Name of Law and Order", ARTE. Documentary series on crowd control and less-lethal weapons around the world.

2023

- "Poutine and the oligarchs", FRANCE TELEVISION. Documentary series on Russian money in Europe.

== Civic involvement ==
Moreira heads the campaign Liberté d'Informer, a civic society movement to align the restrictive French law on the more transparent American Freedom of Information Act model. A petition has gathered nearly 6,000 signatures and a strong public interest.
