= 2024 in literature =

This article contains information about the literary events and publications of 2024.

== Anniversaries ==
- 30 January – Lloyd Alexander was born in 1924 (100th Anniversary).
- 19 April – Lord Byron died of fever in Missolonghi, Greece (200th Anniversary).
- 11 May – On this day 100 years ago, Robert Frost received his first Pulitzer Prize for the book New Hampshire: A Poem with Notes and Grace Notes.
- 2 August – James Baldwin was born in 1924 (100th Anniversary).
- 5 August – Harold Gray's Little Orphan Annie comic strip was first published in the New York Daily News (100th Anniversary).
- 30 September – Truman Capote was born in 1924 (100th Anniversary).
- 5 October – José Donoso was born (100th Anniversary).
- 15 October – Éditions du Sagittaire published André Breton's Surrealist Manifesto (100th Anniversary).
- 100th anniversary of the publication of
  - A Passage to India by E. M. Forster
  - The Magic Mountain by Thomas Mann
  - The King of Elfland's Daughter by Lord Dunsany
  - Twenty Love Poems and a Song of Despair by Pablo Neruda

== New books ==
Dates after each title indicate U.S. publication, unless otherwise indicated.

=== Fiction ===
New adult fiction, sorted by date of publication
Author	Title	Date of publication	Ref.
Álvaro Enrigue	You Dreamed of Empires	January 9	
Kristin Hannah	The Women	February 6	
Jennifer Croft	The Extinction of Irena Rey	March 5	
Percival Everett	James	March 19	
Téa Obreht	The Morningside	March 19	
Amor Towles	Table for Two	April 2	
Miranda July	All Fours	May 14	
Claire Messud	This Strange Eventful History	May 14	
Stephen King	You Like It Darker	May 21	
Alexander Boldizar	The Man Who Saw Seconds	May 21	
Rachel Cusk	Parade	June 6	
Akwaeke Emezi	Little Rot	June 18	
Marcus Kliewer	We Used to Live Here	June 18	
Markus Thielemann	Von Norden rollt ein Donner	July 11	
Keanu Reeves and China Miéville	The Book of Elsewhere	July 23	
Stephen Harrison	The Editors	August 13	
Rachel Kushner	Creation Lake	September 3	
Anna Montague	How Does That Make You Feel, Magda Eklund?	October 22	
Louise Penny	The Grey Wolf	October 29	
Richard Price	Lazarus Man	November 12	
Yael van der Wouden	The Safekeep		

=== Children and young adults ===
New nonfiction, sorted by date of publication
Author	Title	Date of publication	Ref.
Tomi Adeyemi	Children of Anguish and Anarchy	June 25	
Jordan Ifueko	The Maid and the Crocodile	August 13	

=== Nonfiction ===
New nonfiction, sorted by date of publication
Author	Title	Date of publication	Ref.
Sylvain Tesson	Avec les fées	January 10	
Evan Friss	The Bookshop	August 6	
John Grisham & Jim McCloskey	Framed	October 8	
Muhammad Sarip & Nanda Puspita Sheilla	Historipedia Kalimantan Timur	January 23	

=== Biography and memoirs ===
New biographies and memoirs, sorted by date of publication
Author	Title	Date of publication	Ref.
RuPaul	The House of Hidden Meanings	March 5	
Thomas Hitzlsperger	Mutproben	March 7	
Salman Rushdie	Knife: Meditations After an Attempted Murder	April 16	
Melania Trump	Melania	October 8	

== Deaths ==
- January 22 – Elke Erb, German author and poet, 85
- January 24 – N. Scott Momaday, American novelist, short story writer, essayist, and poet. Pulitzer Prize for Fiction winner in 1969.
- February 23 – Alan Brownjohn, English poet and novelist, 92
- March 22 – Laurent de Brunhoff, French children's book writer and illustrator, 98
- April 2 – John Barth, American fiction writer, 93
- April 2 – Maryse Condé, Guadeloupean novelist and playwright, 90
- April 4 – Lynne Reid Banks, English novelist, 94
- April 27 – C. J. Sansom, British crime writer (Shardlake series), 71
- April 27 – Joko Pinurbo, Indonesian poet, 61
- April 28 – Sir Vincent O'Sullivan, New Zealand writer, Poet Laureate (2013–2015), 86
- April 30 – Paul Auster, American crime writer (The New York Trilogy), 77
- May 4 – Jūrō Kara, Japanese playwright, 84
- May 13 – Alice Munro, Canadian writer, 92
- June 26 – Nathaniel Tarn, French-American poet, 95
- July 1 – Funso Aiyejina, Nigerian poet, short story writer, playwright and academic, 75
- July 1 – Ismail Kadare, Albanian writer, 88
- July 28 – Edna O'Brien, Irish writer, 93
- September 15 – Elias Khoury, Lebanese writer, 76
- November 24 – Barbara Taylor Bradford, British-American novelist, 91
- Breyten Breytenbach, South African writer, poet and painter, 85
- December 4 – Chiung Yao, Taiwanese novelist, 86
- December 5 – Jacques Roubaud, French poet, writer, and mathematician, 92
- December 9 – Nikki Giovanni, American poet, 81
- December 17 – Michel del Castillo, French writer, 91

== Awards ==
2024 literary award winners, sorted alphabetically by award
Award	Category	Author	Title	Ref.
Amazon.ca First Novel Award		Alicia Elliott	And Then She Fell	
Atlantic Book Awards	Ann Connor Brimer Award	Jack Wong	The Words We Share	
Atlantic Book Awards	J. M. Abraham Poetry Award	Fawn Parker	Soft Inheritance	
Atlantic Book Awards	Thomas Head Raddall Award	Michelle Porter	A Grandmother Begins the Story	
Bollinger Everyman Wodehouse Prize		Ferdia Lennon	Glorious Exploits	
Booker Prize		Samantha Harvey	Orbital	
Bookseller/Diagram Prize for Oddest Title of the Year		Richard Adams Carey	The Philosopher Fish: Sturgeon, Caviar, and the Geography of Desire	
Danuta Gleed Literary Award		Lisa Alward	Cocktail	
Giller Prize		Anne Michaels	Held	
Governor General's Awards	English Fiction	Jordan Abel	Empty Spaces	
Governor General's Awards	English Non-Fiction	Niigaan Sinclair	Wînipêk: Visions of Canada from an Indigenous Centre	
Governor General's Awards	English Poetry	Chimwemwe Undi	Scientific Marvel	
Governor General's Awards	English Drama	Caleigh Crow	There Is Violence and There Is Righteous Violence and There Is Death, or the Born-Again Crow	
Governor General's Awards	English Children's Literature	Li Charmaine Anne	Crash Landing	
Governor General's Awards	English Children's Illustration	Jean E. Pendziwol, Todd Stewart	Skating Wild on an Inland Sea	
Governor General's Awards	French to English Translation	Katia Grubisic	Nights Too Short to Dance	
Governor General's Awards	French Fiction	Steve Poutré	Lait cru	
Governor General's Awards	French Non-Fiction	Florence-Agathe Dubé-Moreau	Hors jeu : Chronique culturelle et féministe sur l’industrie du sport professionnel	
Governor General's Awards	French Poetry	Névé Dumas	poème dégénéré	
Governor General's Awards	French Drama	Sarah Berthiaume	Wollstonecraft	
Governor General's Awards	French Children's literature	Stéfani Meunier	Une bulle en dehors du temps	
Governor General's Awards	French Children's illustration	Ovila Fontaine, Charlotte Parent	Le premier arbre de Noël	
Governor General's Awards	English to French translation	Éric Fontaine	Ristigouche : Le long cours de la rivière sauvage	
Griffin Poetry Prize	Best Poetry Book	George McWhirter	Self-Portrait in the Zone of Silence	
Griffin Poetry Prize	Best First Poetry Book	Maggie Burton	Chores	
Lambda Literary Awards	Bisexual Fiction	Ling Ling Huang	Natural Beauty	
Lambda Literary Awards	Bisexual Nonfiction	Myriam Gurba	Creep: Accusations and Confessions	
Lambda Literary Awards	Bisexual Poetry	Danielle Cadena Deulen	Desire Museum	
Lambda Literary Awards	Comics	E. M. Carroll	A Ghost in the House	
Lambda Literary Awards	Gay Fiction	Bryan Washington	Family Meal	
Lambda Literary Awards	Gay Memoir/Biography	Jason Yamas	Tweakerworld	
Lambda Literary Awards	Gay Poetry	Charif Shanahan	Trace Evidence	
Lambda Literary Awards	Gay Romance	Cat Sebastian	We Could Be So Good	
Lambda Literary Awards	Lesbian Fiction	Catherine Lacey	Biography of X	
Lambda Literary Awards	Lesbian Memoir/Biography	Amelia Possanza	Lesbian Love Story: A Memoir in Archives	
Lambda Literary Awards	Lesbian Poetry	Kimberly Alidio	Teeter	
Lambda Literary Awards	Lesbian Romance	Georgia Beers	Dance with Me	
Lambda Literary Awards	LGBTQ Anthology	Tuck Woodstock, Niko Stratis	2 Trans 2 Furious: An extremely serious journal of Transgender Street Racing Studies	
Lambda Literary Awards	LGBTQ Children's	Nina LaCour, Sonia Albert	The Apartment House on Poppy Hill	
Lambda Literary Awards	LGBTQ Drama	James Ijames	Fat Ham	
Lambda Literary Awards	LGBTQ+ Romance and Erotica	laura q	A Tight Squeeze: Smutty Trans and Queer Stories	
Lambda Literary Awards	LGBTQ Middle Grade	Robin Gow	Dear Mothman	
Lambda Literary Awards	LGBTQ Mystery	Cari Hunter	A Calculated Risk	
Lambda Literary Awards	LGBT Nonfiction	Matt Baume	Hi Honey, I'm Homo!	
Lambda Literary Awards	LGBTQ Poetry	Quinn Carver Johnson	The Perfect Bastard	
Lambda Literary Awards	LGBTQ Speculative Fiction	Marisa Crane	I Keep My Exoskeletons to Myself	
Lambda Literary Awards	LGBTQ Studies	Erin L. Durban	The Sexual Politics of Empire: Postcolonial Homophobia in Haiti	
Lambda Literary Awards	LGBTQ Young Adult	Abdi Nazemian	Only This Beautiful Moment	
Lambda Literary Awards	Transgender Fiction	Soula Emmanuel	Wild Geese	
Lambda Literary Awards	Transgender Nonfiction	Miss Major Griffin-Gracy, Toshio Meronek	Miss Major Speaks: Conversations with a Black Trans Revolutionary	
Lambda Literary Awards	Transgender Poetry	Michael MJ Jones	Hood Vacations	
League of Canadian Poets	Gerald Lampert Award	Hannah Green	Xanax Cowboy	
League of Canadian Poets	Pat Lowther Award	Sandra Ridley	Vixen	
League of Canadian Poets	Raymond Souster Award	Bradley Peters	Sonnets from a Cell	
Purdy Poetry Prize		Sid Marty	Oldman’s River: New and Collected Poems	
Stephen Leacock Memorial Medal for Humour		Patrick deWitt	The Librarianist	
Trillium Book Awards	English Prose	Nina Dunic	The Clarion	
Trillium Book Awards	English Poetry	A. Light Zachary	More Sure	
Trillium Book Awards	French Prose	Nicolas Weinberg	Vivre ou presque	
Writers' Trust of Canada	Atwood Gibson Writers' Trust Fiction Prize	Sheung-King	Batshit Seven	
Writers' Trust of Canada	Hilary Weston Writers' Trust Prize for Nonfiction	Martha Baillie	There Is No Blue	
Writers' Trust of Canada	Dayne Ogilvie Prize	Anthony Oliveira	Dayspring	
Writers' Trust of Canada	Latner Griffin Writers' Trust Poetry Prize	Rita Wong		
Writers' Trust of Canada	Matt Cohen Award	Marie Clements		
Writers' Trust of Canada	Vicky Metcalf Award for Literature for Young People	Sara O'Leary		
Writers' Trust of Canada	Writers' Trust Engel/Findley Award	Madeleine Thien		
Writers' Trust of Canada	Shaughnessy Cohen Prize for Political Writing	John Vaillant	Fire Weather: The Making of a Beast	
Writers' Trust of Canada	Balsillie Prize for Public Policy	Wendy H. Wong	We, the Data: Human Rights in the Digital Age	
Writers' Trust of Canada	RBC Bronwen Wallace Award for Emerging Writers, Poetry	Faith Paré	"Selections from 'a fine African Head'"	
Writers' Trust of Canada	RBC Bronwen Wallace Award for Emerging Writers, Short Fiction	Nayani Jensen	"Like Rabbits"	

== Notable new movies and TV series based on books ==
Below are some of the most prominent film and television productions that premiered / were broadcast during 2024:

Title	The book on which the movie/TV series is based	Type	Genre	Premiere date	Distribution company / original broadcasting network
One Day	"One Day" by David Nicholls	TV series	Romantic drama	February 8, 2024	Netflix
Spaceman	"Spaceman of Bohemia" by Jaroslav Kalfař	Movie	Science fiction, drama	February 23, 2024	Netflix
Dune: Part Two	"Dune" by Frank Herbert	Movie	Science fiction, action, adventure, fantasy	March 1, 2024	Warner Bros. Films
3 Body Problem	"The Three-Body Problem" by Liu Cixin	TV series	Drama, Science Fiction	March 21, 2024	Netflix
Ronja, the Robber's Daughter	"Ronja, the Robber's Daughter" by Astrid Lindgren	TV series	Adventure, Drama	March 28, 2024	Netflix
A Gentleman in Moscow	"A Gentleman in Moscow" by Amor Towles	TV series	Period drama	March 29, 2024	Paramount+
A Good Girl's Guide to Murder	"A Good Girl's Guide to Murder" by Holly Jackson	TV series	Mystery, Drama, Suspense	July 1, 2024	BBC Three
It Ends with Us	"It Ends with Us" by Colleen Hoover	Movie	Romantic movie	August 6, 2024	Columbia films
Uglies	"Uglies" by Scott Westerfeld	Movie	Science fiction, dystopian film	September 13, 2024	Netflix
Wicked	"Wicked" by Gregory Maguire	Movie	Fantasy, musical	November 3, 2024	Universal Pictures
Pedro Páramo	Pedro Páramo by Juan Rulfo	Film	Drama, magical realism	7 September 2024	Redrum Production, Woo Films; Netflix
