= Johnny Harris (actor) =

English actor, screenwriter, producer and director

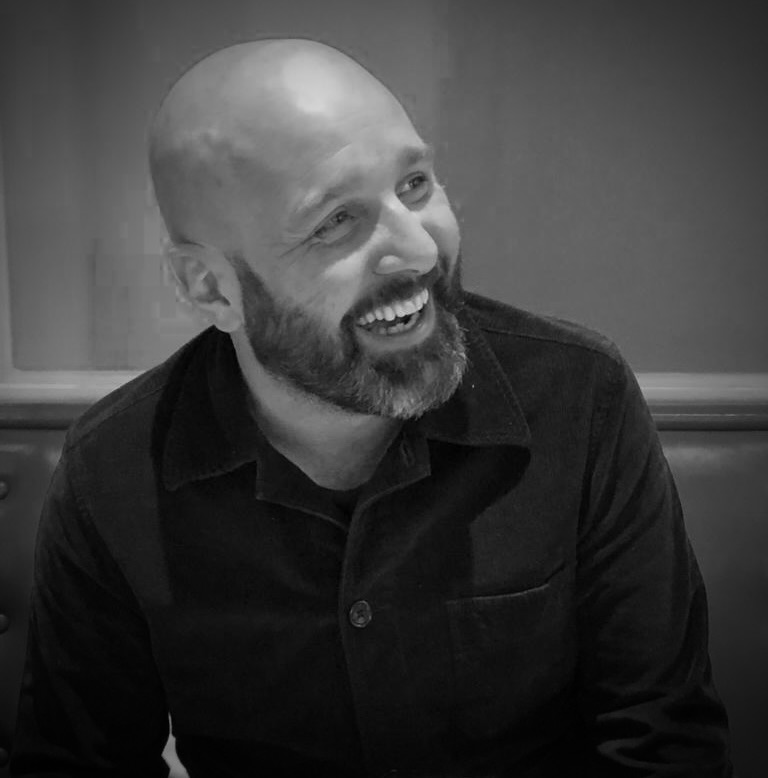
- Harris in 2019
- Born: 3 November 1973 (age 52); Lambeth, London, England, United Kingdom
- Occupations: Actor, Screenwriter, Producer, Director
- Years active: 2000–present

Johnny Harris (born 3 November 1973) is an English actor, screenwriter, producer and director.

His breakthrough role came in the feature film, London to Brighton. which was voted into Time Out's '100 Greatest British Films of All Time'. In an interview in The Independent on Sunday at the time of the film's release, celebrated British film director Shane Meadows said of Harris' performance in the film: "It's an incredibly bold and massively powerful performance. The best I've seen on celluloid for a long time."

Four years later, Meadows cast Harris in his cult television series This Is England '86. Harris received both BAFTA TV Award and Royal Television Society Award nominations for his portrayal of Lol's abusive father, Mick Jenkins. The final episode of This Is England '86 was recently named: 'The Greatest TV Episode of All Time' by The Independent.

In 2017, Harris made his debut as a screenwriter with the highly acclaimed feature film, Jawbone. Harris also starred in and co-produced the movie. He received a BAFTA Film Award nomination in the ‘Outstanding Debut’ Category for his work on the movie; Two BIFA nominations for his performance in the leading role, and a Writers Guild of Great Britain Award nomination for his screenplay.

Paul Weller composed and recorded the soundtrack for Jawbone (Weller's first) and in October 2018, Harris made his debut behind the camera, directing the video for Weller's hit single, "Gravity".

He has starred in Jawbone, The Salisbury Poisonings, This Is England '86, This Is England '88, This Is England '90, Snow White and the Huntsman, Fortitude, Troy: Fall of a City, Medici, Monsters: Dark Continent, From Darkness, Welcome to the Punch, and Jack Thorne's BAFTA TV Award-winning TV show The Fades.

Harris played the iconic role of Magwitch in the BBC/FX Network/Disney adaptation of Great Expectations, alongside Academy Award winner Olivia Colman. The show was exec-produced by Tom Hardy and Sir Ridley Scott.

He co-starred alongside Vicky McClure in the ITV drama series, Without Sin.

In 2024, Harris played Osip Glebnikov in the new Showtime / Paramount production of A Gentleman in Moscow, starring Ewan McGregor. A Gentleman in Moscow is based on the internationally best-selling novel by Amor Towles.

The Independent described Harris as "One of Britain's Finest Actors".

== Early life ==
Born in Lambeth, South East London. Harris left school aged 13 to serve an apprenticeship as a Master Locksmith.

He was a talented young boxer. In 1989 (aged 16), he won the prestigious Junior A.B.A National Boxing Championships. In his late teens, he lived and worked as a dishwasher in Paris, France before returning to London to train as an actor.

Harris studied acting at Morley College in Lambeth. In a ceremony held at Morley College in July 2019, 'The Drama Studio' was renamed 'The Johnny Harris Studio Theatre' in his honour.

== Career ==
He started his career on the stage in London's fringe theatre scene before landing his breakthrough role in the feature film London to Brighton. In an interview in The Independent on Sunday at the time of the film's release, celebrated British film director Shane Meadows said of Harris' performance in the film: "It's an incredibly bold and massively powerful performance, the best I've seen on celluloid for a long time.

Four years later, Meadows cast Harris in This Is England '86. Harris received both BAFTA TV Award and Royal Television Society Award nominations for his portrayal of Lol's abusive father Mick Jenkins. The following year he reprised the role in This Is England '88, with the show winning the BAFTA TV Award for Best Mini-Series. Harris continued a run of award-winning projects with a leading role in the BBC drama The Fades, which won a BAFTA TV Award for Best Drama Series.

In 2012, he was cast in the Universal Pictures movie Snow White and the Huntsman starring Kristen Stewart, Charlize Theron and Chris Hemsworth. Harris played one of the "Seven Dwarves" alongside Bob Hoskins, Ray Winstone, and Ian McShane.

Another feature film followed with Welcome to the Punch starring James McAvoy, and Mark Strong, being released internationally in 2013.

The Independent described Harris as "One of Britain's finest actors".

In 2015, Harris played Ronnie Morgan in the Sky Atlantic/Pivot 12-part drama Fortitude alongside Michael Gambon and Stanley Tucci. Fortitude was shot on location in Iceland and London, and aired on both sides of the Atlantic in January 2015. That same year, he was cast in his first starring role in a feature film as the American Platoon Sergeant Noah Frater in the feature film Monsters: Dark Continent, the sequel to the Gareth Edwards film Monsters. That same year, Harris also returned as Mick Jenkins in This Is England '90, the final instalment of the successful series. He also starred as DCI John Hind, opposite Anne-Marie Duff in From Darkness, a new four-part drama for BBC1.

In February 2016, filming began on Harris' debut project as a screenwriter with the feature film Jawbone. He co-produced the film and also starred in the lead role, alongside Ray Winstone, Ian McShane and Michael Smiley.

Paul Weller composed and recorded an original soundtrack for Jawbone.

Former World Featherweight Boxing Champion Barry McGuigan and his son, Shane, served as boxing consultants on the film, as well as spending two years training Harris in preparation for his portrayal of ex-boxer Jimmy McCabe.

The production was backed by BBC Films and released in cinemas in May 2017, with Harris receiving a BAFTA Film Award "Outstanding Debut by a British Writer, Director, or Producer" nomination for his work on the film, as well as winning two National Film Awards for 'Best Action' and 'Best Breakthrough Performance'. Harris also received a Writers Guild of Great Britain 'Best Debut Screenplay' Award nomination. He received BIFA Nominations in both 'Best Actor' and 'Best Debut Screenplay' categories.

In 2018, Harris returned to television as Agamemnon in the BBC/Netflix series Troy: Fall of a City. Filming took place on location in Cape Town, South Africa. In the same year, he also made his debut behind the camera, directing the music video for the Paul Weller single, "Gravity". In 2019, Harris appeared as Franklin Scrooge in the BBC/Fox TV adaptation of A Christmas Carol.

In 2020, he starred as Bruno Bernardi in the third and final season of the Netflix drama series Medici Season 3 (2019). Filming took place in Rome and Tuscany. That same year, he played Charlie Rowley in the BBC drama series The Salisbury Poisonings, a mini-series based on the tragic real life events of 2018.

In December 2022, Harris was re-united on screen with Vicky McClure in the new ITV X Drama Series, Without Sin ..., the first time the two have performed together since their portrayal of a father and daughter in the multi-award-winning TV series, This is England '86.

Harris played the iconic role of Magwitch, alongside Academy Award winner Olivia Colman (as Miss Havisham) in the new Disney/BBC/FX Networks co-production of Great Expectations. The show is exec-produced by Sir Ridley Scott and Tom Hardy and adapted for the screen by Steven Knight, the creator of Peaky Blinders. Great Expectations premiered on TV screens in both America and the UK on 26 March 2023.

In the same year he also starred in A House in Jerusalem, a feature film directed by Muayad Alayan.

In 2024, Harris played Osip Glebnikov in the Showtime / Paramount production of A Gentleman in Moscow, starring Ewan McGregor. A Gentleman in Moscow is an 8 part series based on the internationally best-selling novel by Amor Towles.

== Filmography ==
=== Film ===
- Gangster No. 1 (2000) as Derek
- It Was an Accident (2000) as Robbie
- London to Brighton (2006) as Derek
- Atonement (2007) as Soldier in Bray Bar
- The Cottage (2008) as Smoking Joe (uncredited)
- Daylight Robbery (2008) as Terry
- RocknRolla (2008) as Gary
- The Imaginarium of Doctor Parnassus (2009) as Policeman
- Dorian Gray (2009) as James Vane
- You Will Meet a Tall Dark Stranger (2010) as Ray's Friend
- Black Death (2010) as Mold
- Huge (2010) as Warren Duggan
- Ultramarines: A Warhammer 40,000 Movie (2010) as Brother Nidon (voice)
- War Horse (2011) as Infantry Recruitment Officer
- Home (2011)
- Snow White and the Huntsman (2012) as Quert
- Welcome to the Punch (2013) as Dean Warns
- The Last Days on Mars (2013) as Robert Irwin
- Monsters: Dark Continent (2014) as Noah Frater
- Jawbone (2017) as Jimmy McCabe
- A House in Jerusalem (2023) as the Father Michael.

=== Television ===
- Holby City (2000) as Sammy Briscoe
- The Bill (2002) as Danny Hines
- EastEnders (2005) as Sean
- HolbyBlue (2007) as Garry Drake
- Clapham Junction (2007, TV Movie) as Tough Man
- Heroes and Villains (2008, TV Series documentary) as Oenameaus / Narrator
- The Passion (2008) as Asher
- Whitechapel (2009) as DC Sanders
- Law & Order: UK (2010) as Harry Lucas
- This Is England '86 (2010, Nominated BAFTA Television Award for Best Supporting Actor, and Nominated Royal Television Society Award for Best Actor) as Mick
- The Fades (2011) as Neil Valentine
- This Is England '88 (2011) as Mick
- Fortitude (2015) as Ronnie Morgan
- This is England '90 (2015) as Mick
- From Darkness (2015) as DCI John Hind
- Troy: Fall of a City (2018) as Agamemnon
- Medici (2019) as Bruno Bernardi
- A Christmas Carol (2019) as Franklin Scrooge
- The Salisbury Poisonings (2020) as Charlie Rowley
- Without Sin (2022) as Charles Stone
- Great Expectations (2023) as Magwitch
- A Gentleman in Moscow (2024) as Osip Glebnikov
- Legends (2026) as Eddie
- Blade Runner 2099 (2026) as TBA
