= Lincoln City Libraries =

Public library system in Lincoln, Nebraska

- Location: Lincoln, Nebraska, U.S.
- Established: 1875; 151 years ago
- Branches: 7

Collection
- Size: 759,204

Access and use
- Population served: 220,231 registered users

Other information
- Budget: $12,222,460
- Website: lincolnlibraries.org

Lincoln City Libraries is the official public library system in Lincoln, Nebraska, United States. It has eight branches. The main branch is Bennet Martin Public Library, located in Downtown Lincoln. The library was originally established in 1875 as a private library and became a public library two years later.

== History ==
Lincoln City Library was originally established as the Lincoln City Library and Reading Room in 1875. The library closed in May of that same year due to financial struggles. The library was re-established on January 28, 1876, and by 1877, included 1,300 books. In 1877, the Nebraska State Legislature passed a bill allowing the municipal governments of any community in the state of Nebraska to form a public library system. That same year, Lincoln City Library was re-established as a public library.

On September 16, 1899, over 16,000 books were lost from a fire that occurred in the Masonic Temple, where the library was located. Only 800 books, which were lent out to patrons, survived. Mary Baird Bryan petitioned Andrew Carnegie to help build a replacement library. Carnegie accepted, and donated $75,000 for the construction of a new library. The new library, a Carnegie library later referred to as Old Main, opened in 1902. In 1901, the library began expanding to other parts of Lincoln, with its first branch, also a Carnegie library, opening in 1909.

In 1960 it was announced that Old Main would be replaced by a new main library, known as Bennet Martin Public Library. The library was named after former mayor Martin Bennett, who donated $300,000 to the library's construction. The main branch officially opened in October 1962. In 1988, the library converted from a catalog system to a digital Public Access Computer terminal system. In January 2019, Lincoln City Libraries stopped charging overdue fees for materials designated for youth or children. In May 2025, it was announced that the Bennet Martin Public Library would be replaced with a new location at the former Southeast Community College Education Square Building. Renovation for the building is planned for fall 2026 and the new central library is planned to open by 2028.

== Branches ==
Lincoln City Libraries includes a main library and seven branches. The main library, Martin Bennet Public Library, opened in 1962. Library branches include Anderson Branch Library, Bethany Branch Library, Eiseley Branch Library, Gere Branch Library, South Branch Library, Walt Branch Library, Williams Branch Library. Additionally, the Lied Bookmobile, a mobile library, provides individualized service to Lincoln and Lancaster County.

=== Bennett Martin Public Library ===
The Bennett Martin Public Library is the central branch of Lincoln City Libraries. The library is located at 136 S 14th St. in downtown Lincoln. The library was announced in 1960 as a replacement for the previous Carnegie library. Construction began in 1961 and the building was completed in 1962. In 2025, the city announced plans to close Bennett Martin in favor of renovating the Southeast Community College Education Square Building for library usage.

=== Old Main Library ===
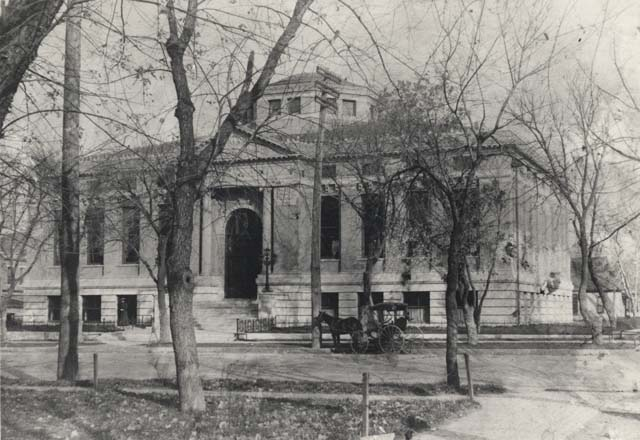
Old Main in 1901

The Old Main Library was the former central branch of Lincoln City Libraries. It was announced in 1899 after a $75,000 donation from Andrew Carnegie. The library began construction in 1900 and opened in 1902. The library was demolished in 1961 to make way for its successor, Martin Bennet Public Library. The main branch then moved to a temporary location on the second floor of the Pontiac-Cadillac Co. Building. Martin Bennet later opened in 1962.

=== Anderson Branch Library ===
The Anderson Branch Library is the Northeastern branch of Lincoln City Libraries. The library is located at 3635 Touzalin Ave. The library was built from a bond issue passed in 1969. Construction began in 1970 and the library officially opened in October 1971. The library was named for former Nebraska governor and Lincoln mayor Victor Anderson. The library was designed with an open-space design, and was designed by the Clark and Enerson architectural firm. The library closed in 1998 for renovations, which were completed in 1999.

=== Bethany Branch Library ===
The Bethany Branch Library is the Bethany branch of Lincoln City Libraries. The library is located at 1530 Superior St. The library was originally established in October 1937 by members of the Bethany Woman's club. The library was originally located in an old bank building at 1551 North Cotner Blvd. renovated for library use. The current library opened in 1959 and was designed by Burkett Graf. In 1984, due to a budget crisis, Lincoln City Libraries announced that the Bethany Library would close. However, due to public protests, the library stayed open. In 2010, the library closed for renovations and re-opened three weeks later.

=== Eiseley Branch Library ===
The Eisley Branch Library is the Belmont branch of Lincoln City Libraries. The library is located at 1530 Superior St. The library was announced in 2000 and was named after former Lincoln writer Walt Eiseley. The library replaced the original Belmont Branch Library, which was located at 3335 No. 12th St. and opened in 1969. The library officially opened in 2002 and was designed by Clark Enersen Partners.

=== Gere Branch Library ===
The Gere Branch Library is the Southeast branch of Lincoln City Libraries. The library is located at 2400 S 56th St. The library was established in October 1971 and was named after Charles Gere. Gere was considered at the time to be Lincoln's first citizen. The library was expanded in the late 1980s, which added a new front entrance to the Southeast corner of the library.

=== South Branch Library ===
The South Branch Library is the South branch of Lincoln City Libraries. The library is located at 2675 South St. The library was established in September 1955. The library was the first branch to be opened since Bethany Branch opened in 1937. The library was the first in the system to have air conditioning. The library was renovated in 1995. Renovation included adding handicap-accessible ramps and structural repair.

=== Walt Branch Library ===
The Walt Branch Library is the Far South branch of Lincoln City Libraries. The library is located at 2675 South St. The library was announced in 2000 and was named after Bess Dodson Walt. The library was established in 2002. While designed to mirror Eiseley Branch, Walt Branch is slightly smaller. The library was designed by Clark Enersen Partners. In 2024, a mural created by children's author Chloe Burgett was added to the East side of the building.

=== Williams Branch Library ===
The Williams Branch Library is the Northwestern branch of Lincoln City Libraries. The library is located at 4900 Mike Scholl St. The library was originally established in 1973 as a mini-library in the Arnold Heights Recreation Center. In 2008, the library was re-established as the Williams Branch Library, named for former library trustee Dan A. Williams. In 2022, construction began on a new recreation center, where the Williams Branch Would move to upon completion. The recreation center was completed in 2023 and the library moved into the center that same year.

=== Lied Bookmobile ===
The Lied Bookmobile is a mobile library that provides individualized service to Lincoln and Lancaster County. The mobile library was originally established as the Lincoln Bookmobile in 1975. In 2010, it was announced that the bookmobile would purchase a new electric van to replace the former gas powered van. The bookmobile changed its name to the Lied Bookmobile, after a $100,000 donation from the Lied Foundation. The Lied Bookmobile officially entered service in 2012.

== One Book One Lincoln ==
Lincoln City Libraries began a community reading program called "One Book, One Lincoln" in 2002. A library committee announces a list of finalists on Memorial Day, and members of the community vote throughout the summer. The winning book is announced near the end of summer. A history of One Book One Lincoln titles is listed below.

- 2002: Plainsong by Kent Haruf
- 2003: Bel Canto by Ann Patchett
- 2004: Peace Like a River by Leif Enger
- 2005: The Kite Runner by Khaled Hosseini
- 2006: The Devil in the White City by Erik Larson
- 2007: The Worst Hard Time: The Untold Story of Those Who Survived the Dust Bowl by Timothy Egan
- 2008: The Thirteenth Tale by Diane Setterfield
- 2009: People of the Book by Geraldine Brooks
- 2010: I Am a Man: Chief Standing Bear's Journey for Justice by Joe Starita
- 2011: Cutting for Stone by Abraham Verghese
- 2012: Destiny of the Republic by Candice Millard
- 2013: The Unlikely Pilgrimage of Harold Fry by Rachel Joyce
- 2014: The Light Between Oceans by M.L. Stedman
- 2015: Americanah by Chimamanda Ngozi Adichi
- 2016: Being Mortal: Medicine and What Matters in the End by Atul Gawande
- 2017: A Gentleman in Moscow by Amor Towles
- 2018: Killers of the Flower Moon: The Osage Murders and the Birth of the FBI by David Grann
- 2019: The Far Away Brothers: Two Young Migrants and the Making of an American Life by Lauren Markham
- 2020: Dear Edward by Ann Napolitano
- 2021: Hidden Valley Road: Inside the Mind of an American Family by Robert Kolker
- 2022: The Lincoln Highway by Amor Towles
- 2023: Remarkably Bright Creatures by Shelby Van Pelt
- 2024: The Berry Pickers by Amanda Peters
- 2025: Dust Child by Nguyen Phan Que Ma
- 2026: Culpability by Bruce Holsinger
