= Bookshop (disambiguation) =

A bookshop is a store where books are bought and sold. It may also refer to:

- Bookshop (company), an American online bookstore
- The Bookshop, a 1978 novel by Penelope Fitzgerald
  - The Bookshop (film), a 2017 film directed by Isabel Coixet based on the novel
- The Bookshop (nonfiction book), a 2024 book by Evan Friss
