= From Darkness =

British television series

- Genre: Crime drama
- Created by: Katie Baxendale
- Written by: Katie Baxendale
- Directed by: Dominic Leclerc
- Starring: Anne-Marie Duff; Johnny Harris; Richard Rankin; Caroline Lee-Johnson; Luke Newberry; Leanne Best
- Country of origin: United Kingdom
- Original language: English
- No. of series: 1
- No. of episodes: 4 (list of episodes)

Production
- Executive producers: Oliver Kent; Hilary Martin
- Producer: Helen Ziegler
- Running time: 60 minutes
- Production company: BBC Productions

Original release
- Network: BBC One; BBC One HD
- Release: 4 October – 25 October 2015

From Darkness is a British psychological crime drama that premiered on BBC One on 4 October 2015. The series stars Anne-Marie Duff as former police officer Claire Church. A total of four episodes were broadcast. A DVD of the complete series was released on 9 November 2015. Internationally, the series premiered in Australia on 1 November 2015, on BBC First.

== Plot ==
Claire Church, a former police officer who moves away to the remote Western Isles in an attempt to escape the violent past that still haunts her, finds herself pulled back by her former lover and colleague DCI John Hind, and his new DS Anthony Boyce, into an investigation she thought she had left well behind. When two victims are uncovered beneath the murky depths of a Manchester building site, Hind links them to a serial killer whose identity has not been discovered. Now, 17 years on, he appears to be killing again. But can Church and Hind piece together all of the clues – old and new – to finally discover the killer's identity?

== Cast ==
- Anne-Marie Duff as Claire Church
- Johnny Harris as DCI John Hind
- Caroline Lee-Johnson as Superintendent Lola Keir
- Luke Newberry as DS Anthony Boyce
- Leanne Best as Julie Hind
- Richard Rankin as Norrie Duncan
- Emma Edmondson as DC Rachel Weir
- Lyndsey Marshal as Lucy Maxley
- Adrian Rawlins as Gareth Harding
- Josh Taylor as Ollie Hind

== Episode list ==
No.	Title	Directed by	Written by	Original release date	UK viewers (millions)
1	"Episode 1"	Dominic LeClerc	Katie Baxendale	4 October 2015	6.09m
Now living on a Scottish island with her younger partner Norrie and their daughter, former policewoman Claire Church gets a visit from her old colleague John Hind, following the discovery of two skeletons in Claire's old patch in Manchester. Hind believes these are related to an unsolved, seventeen year old case in which a serial killer murdered prostitutes and in which Claire was heavily involved before resigning. Claire makes it clear to Hind, whose apparent obsession with solving the case is annoying his wife, that she has no intention of returning to work to help him. Then another victim is discovered, killed in the same way as the others and with a cryptic note attached to the body.
2	"Episode 2"	Dominic LeClerc	Katie Baxendale	11 October 2015	5.23m
Following evidence linking her to the fresh murder of Agota Calgys, Claire returns to Manchester, to the annoyance of Norrie, who discovers that she is not taking her anti-depressants. Hind's chief suspect is dogs' home owner Roy Marsh, but CCTV footage from 1999 reveals that victim Sally Fisher got into a car with Gareth Harding, who knew her, but has an alibi for Agota's murder. Claire wonders if two different killers have been at work. While visiting Agota's flat, Claire is assaulted by an intruder and later receives a disturbing package.
3	"Episode 3"	Dominic LeClerc	Katie Baxendale	18 October 2015	4.90m
Placing Claire under witness protection, Hind tells her his view that Harding – who has a stake in clearing the red light area – is the killer. However Claire believes the current murderer is a survivor of the first series of attacks, her research leading her to an ex-student called Lucy Maxley. She receives a call from a woman accusing her of offering to help in the past, but lying to her. This inclines her to Hind's view that Harding is responsible – but when she confronts him at his daughter's wedding, Claire makes a fool of herself before making a confession to Hind.
4	"Episode 4"	Dominic LeClerc	Katie Baxendale	25 October 2015	4.46m
Claire tells Hind that her suspect has been calling her and threatening to kill more victims if the original murderer is not apprehended – and believes that they need help. Hind disagrees but is suspended following complaints by the Hardings, so he tries a little sleuthing of his own, helped by young sergeant Boyce, establishing a context for the original slayings. However Claire discovers that two killers may have been at work, one in the late 90s and now one in the present. With what she knows will she be in time to save another potential victim?

== Reception ==
The series had a mixed reception from critics.

The List summarised their review: "We've walked this road too many times before. There's nothing blatantly wrong with From Darkness – it's well produced, the acting is uniformly good, the story intriguing – but after The Killing, The Bridge, even Shetland, it feels anonymous."

News site Metro said "Not a fan of police procedural dramas? Good, because this ain’t that. From Darkness is a character-driven tale of one women’s journey and resolve and it includes a bloody brilliant performance by Duff. It’s full of atmospheric music – the opening credits gave us chills alone – and perfectly placed flashbacks keeping you hooked on Claire’s story."

Sam Wollaston in The Guardian called it intriguing but derivative.
