= Monsters (2010 film) =

2010 British film by Gareth Edwards

- Theatrical release poster
- Directed by: Gareth Edwards
- Written by: Gareth Edwards
- Produced by: Allan Niblo; James Richardson
- Starring: Scoot McNairy; Whitney Able
- Cinematography: Gareth Edwards
- Edited by: Colin Goudie
- Music by: Jon Hopkins
- Production company: Vertigo Films
- Distributed by: Vertigo Films
- Release dates: 13 March 2010 (SXSW); 3 December 2010 (United Kingdom)
- Running time: 94 minutes
- Country: United Kingdom
- Language: English
- Budget: $500,000
- Box office: $4.2 million

Monsters is a 2010 British science fiction and horror film written and directed by Gareth Edwards (in his feature directorial debut). Edwards also served as the cinematographer, production designer, and a visual effects artist. The film takes place years after a NASA probe crashed in Mexico, which leads to the sudden appearance of giant tentacled monsters. It follows Andrew Kaulder (Scoot McNairy), an American photojournalist tasked with escorting his employer's daughter Samantha Wynden (Whitney Able) back to the United States by crossing through Mexico's "Infected Zone", where the creatures reside.

Edwards conceived the idea for the film after seeing fishermen attempt to bring a creature in with a net, and imagining a monster inside. He pitched the idea to Vertigo Films, who suggested he watch In Search of a Midnight Kiss, a low-budget film starring McNairy. Edwards cast McNairy and Able in the lead roles. Principal photography lasted three weeks and had a production crew of six people. Filming took place in five countries, and many locations were used without permission. Most of the extras were people who were at these locations during filming and were persuaded to act in it; all of their dialogue was improvised, and Edwards provided outlines of the primary plot points.

Monsters premiered at South by Southwest on 13 March 2010. Hours later, Magnet Releasing acquired the rights to distribute it in North America. It had a limited release there, beginning on 29 October 2010, followed by a theatrical release in the United Kingdom on 3 December 2010. The film received generally positive reviews and was a box office success, grossing US$4.2 million against a budget of less than $500,000. Monsters: Dark Continent, a sequel, was released in the UK on 1 May 2015.

== Plot ==
After a NASA space probe (sent to verify the existence of extraterrestrial life in the Solar System) crash-lands in Mexico, extraterrestrial life forms spread throughout the Mexico–United States border region, leading to the quarantine of the northern portion of Mexico. US and Mexican troops battle to contain the creatures, and a huge wall stretching along the border ostensibly keeps the US protected.

American photojournalist Andrew Kaulder receives a call from his employer, who tells Andrew to find his daughter, Samantha Wynden, and escort her back to the US. Andrew locates Samantha in a Central American hospital and the pair board a train, until learning the tracks ahead have been damaged. They discover that if they do not leave the country within a few days, sea and air travel will be blocked for six months. Andrew and Samantha decide to hitchhike their way to the coast. Andrew buys Samantha an expensive ferry ticket for the next morning. After enjoying the local nightlife together, Andrew sleeps with a local woman who steals their passports. Unable to board the ferry, Samantha is forced to barter her engagement ring for passage through the quarantine zone.

They travel by riverboat until being transferred to a group of armed escorts who are to lead them overland toward the Mexico–U.S. border. The convoy is attacked by the creatures. Andrew and Samantha escape, but none of the guards survive. Pressing on, they discover the bodies of dead travelers and bond at the top of a pyramid ruin in sight of the US border wall. By the time they reach the border, the creatures have crossed into the United States. Andrew and Samantha travel through a severely damaged, evacuated town in Texas, and find an abandoned gas station with power where they call the army for help.

While waiting for help to arrive, they make phone calls to their families. A lone creature silently approaches the gas station. Hiding, Samantha observes several tentacles exploring the inside of the store, seemingly soaking up a television's light. Samantha quickly unplugs the television and the creature loses interest. Another creature appears and they communicate with one another and possibly mate via light impulses. The creatures leave as the military arrives. Samantha and Andrew kiss before they are rushed into different vehicles. The chronological ending takes place at the beginning of the film, filmed in green night vision sight, when the military rescue team is attacked by a creature on the way back to base. Andrew is last seen carrying Samantha's lifeless body, as an airstrike is launched at the creature.

== Cast ==
- Scoot McNairy as Andrew Kaulder
- Whitney Able as Samantha Wynden

== Production ==
=== Development ===
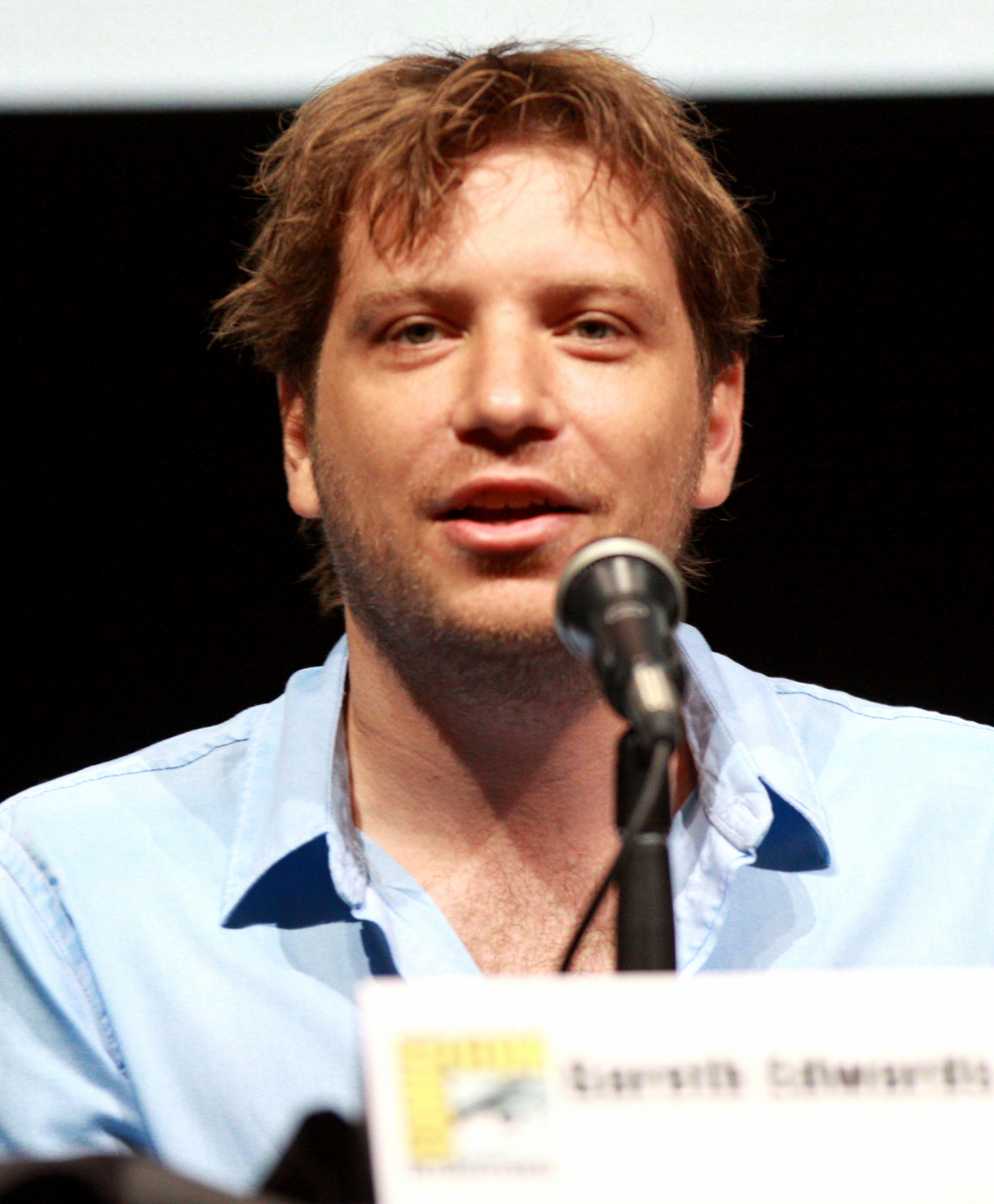
Edwards, who wrote, directed, and shot Monsters

While studying at university in 1996, Edwards made a short monster movie set in suburbia. He initially wanted to expand the idea but after the release of War of the Worlds, he believed it was "not going to be special any more". Considering that the film would have to be low-budget, Edwards decided to embrace the found footage style of The Blair Witch Project and mix that element with his original concept. After learning about Cloverfield's similar premise, he abandoned this idea and moved on to a concept where a "war [is] going on somewhere on the other side of the world and no one cares".

Edwards conceived the film while watching some fishermen struggling to haul in their net and imagining a monster inside of it. He had the idea to make a monster movie set "years after most other monster movies end, when people aren't running and screaming but life is going on" and "where a giant, dead sea monster is considered completely normal".

=== Pre-production ===
Edwards pitched his idea to Vertigo Films, where producer James Richardson asked him to watch In Search of a Midnight Kiss for an example of low-budget film making. It starred Scoot McNairy and had been made for $15,000. Edwards was impressed by McNairy but wanted a real couple to portray the lead characters. McNairy sent Edwards a picture of his girlfriend, actress Whitney Able, who Edwards initially thought was "too good-looking". He changed his mind after meeting them and cast them both.

=== Filming ===
"There is an amazing contradiction at the heart of Central America: potential trouble right alongside beauty and friendship. Many bad things happened while we were there ... But ... we were in some of the most beautiful places I'd ever seen, being helped by the most generous people in the world."

— Gareth Edwards, recalling events during filming in Central America

The film was written and directed by Gareth Edwards, while Allan Niblo and James Richardson of Vertigo Films served as producers. Edwards did not storyboard or script the film but wrote a treatment of the story and outlines that detailed points that needed to be hit in dialogue. The filming equipment cost approximately $15,000 and the production budget came in "way under" $500,000. The film was able to be made on such a low budget largely due to the production using consumer grade prosumer level equipment instead of professional paraphernalia. The film was shot using digital video cameras rather than the more expensive 35 mm film and was edited on a laptop computer. Many of the locations in the film were used without permission and most of the extras were people who were already at the locations. As the extras were non-actors who were persuaded to be in the film, their actions were improvised.

The film was shot in Belize, Mexico, Guatemala, Costa Rica, and the United States over three weeks. For about 90 per cent of the principal photography, the crew consisted of seven people transported in one van: Edwards, Able, McNairy, sound operator Ian Maclagan, line producer Jim Spencer, Mexican fixer Verity Oswin and a driver.

=== Editing and effects ===
Every night after shooting, editor Colin Goudie and his assistant Justin Hall would download the footage so the memory sticks could be cleared and be ready for the next day. While new footage was being shot, the filmed footage was edited at the production team's hotel. After filming concluded, the crew had over 100 hours of footage. The original cut was over four hours long but was trimmed to 94 minutes after eight months of editing. Edwards originally had the ending of the film both at the beginning and the end. He and the producers disagreed about the placement, so he decided to put the chronological ending of the film at the beginning and end the film immediately after Andrew and Samantha kiss.

Edwards created the visual effects using off-the-shelf Adobe software, ZBrush and Autodesk 3ds Max. He had five months to create all 250 visual effects shots, a process he undertook in his bedroom. He produced two shots a day until he reached the first creature shot, when "suddenly two months went by and [he] still hadn't finished a single creature shot"; Edwards stated that the creatures' visual effects were the most challenging element of production. Due to time constraints, the sound effects had to be produced before the visual effects.

== Release ==
=== Theatrical ===
Monsters premiered at the South by Southwest Film Festival on 13 March 2010. In May, the film was screened at the Cannes Film Market. It also screened as part of the 64th Edinburgh International Film Festival on 18 June 2010, and screened twice at the Los Angeles Film Festival on 23 and 26 June. The film was first released in Russia on 30 September 2010. Monsters was later released in the United States on 29 October, in Canada on 5 November, and the United Kingdom on 3 December. In the weeks leading up to the UK release, a marketing campaign using social network Foursquare was announced. Vue Entertainment and Cineworld Cinemas set up 'infected locations' which gave users access to exclusive Monsters content and the chance to win random on-the-spot prizes.

=== Home media ===
Monsters was released on DVD and Blu-ray in the United Kingdom on 11 April 2011 by Vertigo Films, in Australia on 13 April 2011 by Madman Entertainment, and in North America on 1 February 2011 by Magnolia Pictures.

== Reception ==
=== Box office ===
Hours after the film's screening at South by Southwest, Magnet Releasing acquired the distribution rights in the United States. Tom Quinn, an executive at Magnet, stated that they "were blown away by Monsters" and were "thrilled to bring [Edwards'] vision to American audiences." Shortly after, D Films acquired the rights to distribute the film in Canada. Monsters was released in 19 countries between September 2010 and December 2011. It grossed $4.2 million from worldwide ticket sales, earning over $1 million in the United Kingdom and Russia and over $100,000 in Mexico, France, the United States, Australia, Germany, Spain, Poland, and Turkey.

The film was released in the United Kingdom on 3 December 2010. On its opening weekend, Monsters grossed $550,110 in 164 cinemas, averaging $3,354 per cinema. The following weekend, the film dropped to 153 and grossed $244,607, a 55.5% decrease, averaging $1,599. Over its three subsequent weekends, the film grossed $99,891. The film concluded its five-week run on 2 January 2011; the gross was $1,442,633.

The film was released in North America on 29 October 2010. On its opening weekend, Monsters grossed $20,508 in three theatres, for an average of $6,836 per theatre. The following weekend, the film screened in 13 theatres and grossed an additional $28,590. In its third weekend, the film expanded to 25 theatres and grossed $48,680, averaging $1,947 per theatre. Over its six subsequent weekends, the film grossed an additional $60,141. On 26 December 2010, the film concluded its nine-week run with a gross of $237,301.

=== Critical response ===
Monsters received generally positive reviews from critics. The review aggregator website Rotten Tomatoes reported that 73% of critics have given the film a positive review based on 159 reviews, with an average rating of 6.61/10. The site's critics consensus reads, "It doesn't quite live up to its intriguing premise, but Monsters is a surprising blend of alien-invasion tropes, political themes, and relationship drama." On Metacritic, the film has a score of 63 based on 26 reviews, which is considered to be "generally favorable reviews".

Roger Ebert awarded the film three and a half out of four stars, praising its focus on "characters, relationships, fear and mostly unseen menace" rather than its visual effects, as well as the acting. He also commended Edwards for "evoking ... awe and beauty" and for the creature designs. Peter Bradshaw, writing for The Guardian, gave it four stars out of five, described the film as a "terrifically exciting sci-fi movie" and concluded that Edwards "channels the upriver nightmares of [Werner] Herzog and [Francis Ford] Coppola, with a strong streak of Spielbergian wonder at the sight of two aliens apparently dancing". Michael Phillips of the Chicago Tribune was critical of the performances but praised the film's "considerable, crafty virtues", its premise, and its ending. Jeanette Catsoulis of The New York Times called the film "wondrously atmospheric" and "effortlessly compel[ling]", and praised Edwards' "beautiful, otherworldly" visual effects. Dan Jolin of Empire echoed the comparison to Herzog, opining that the film "exhibits the lyrical surrealism of [his] jungle excursions". He also praised the visual effects, Edwards' cinematography, and the "simmering" chemistry between McNairy and Able, concluding that the film was "both shoestring and sci-fi filmmaking at its best". Michael Rechtshaffen of the Associated Press praised Edwards for "add[ing] original touches to the genre" and for his production design. He criticised the "tentative" and "alienating" performances of McNairy and Able, but stated that "the overall picture still impresses". Jennie Punter of The Globe and Mail disagreed, comparing the lead actors' chemistry to Ethan Hawke and Julie Delpy in Before Sunrise and praising the pacing. Clark Collis of Entertainment Weekly gave the film a B+, also praising the performances of McNairy and Able and commending Edwards' work.

Conversely, Ty Burr of the Boston Globe gave the film a mixed review, granting it two and a half stars out of five. Though he praised the score, he stated that it is "more fascinating for its ambitions than for what it accomplishes" and criticised the main characters for being "too shallow" and unengaging. Robert Abele of the Los Angeles Times criticised the "weak plot, forgettable dialogue and sloppy politics" and called the lead characters "empty-headed blanks". Amy Biancolli of the San Francisco Chronicle called McNairy and Able a "semi-interesting" pair, but disliked the lack of monsters in the film, the dialogue, and the familiarity of the story. Michael O'Sullivan of The Washington Post called the film "a less-than-compelling relationship drama", criticising it for being unoriginal and predictable, and that hiding the monsters made them less frightening.

=== Accolades ===
At the 13th British Independent Film Awards, Monsters was nominated in six categories including Best Picture, Best Director for Edwards, and Best Actor for McNairy. The film won for Best Director, Best Technical Achievement, and Best Achievement in Production. At the 64th British Academy Film Awards, Edwards was nominated for Outstanding Debut by a British Director, but lost to Chris Morris for Four Lions. It won Best Independent Movie at the 2011 Scream Awards, and was nominated for Best Science Fiction Movie. The film also won Best International Film at the 37th Saturn Awards. The National Board of Review named the film one of the top ten independent films of 2010, and it placed third on Moviefone's Top 10 Sci-Fi Movies of 2010 list.

== Sequel ==
A sequel, Monsters: Dark Continent, started filming in March 2013 in Jordan and Detroit, with Tom Green directing and Jay Basu writing. Gareth Edwards and Scoot McNairy served as executive producers. Johnny Harris, Sam Keeley and Joe Dempsie starred in the film. Originally scheduled to be released on 28 November 2014, the film's release date was then moved to 27 February 2015, and was eventually released by Vertigo on 1 May 2015. In contrast to Monsters, the sequel was not well received by critics, with an 18% score on review aggregator Rotten Tomatoes based on 34 reviews.

== TV series ==
In January 2018, it was reported that Vertigo Films and Channel 4 were developing a TV series based on the film. Ronan Bennett was attached as showrunner with Daniel Fajemisin-Duncan and Marlon Smith as writers.
