= Jawbone (film) =

2017 British drama film

- Theatrical release poster
- Directed by: Thomas Q. Napper
- Written by: Johnny Harris
- Produced by: Michael Elliott; Johnny Harris
- Starring: Johnny Harris; Ray Winstone; Ian McShane; Michael Smiley
- Cinematography: Tat Radcliffe
- Edited by: David Charap
- Music by: Paul Weller
- Production companies: Emu Films; Revolution Films; BBC Films
- Distributed by: Vertigo Films
- Release date: 12 May 2017
- Country: United Kingdom
- Language: English

Jawbone is a 2017 British drama film directed by Thomas Q. Napper and written by Johnny Harris. The film stars Johnny Harris, Ray Winstone, Ian McShane, Michael Smiley. The film was released on 12 May 2017 by Vertigo Films.

== Cast ==
- Johnny Harris as Jimmy McCabe
- Ray Winstone as William Carney
- Ian McShane as Joe Padgett
- Michael Smiley as Eddie
- Luke J.I. Smith as Damian Luke

== Plot ==
Jimmy (Johnny Harris) is an alcoholic at a difficult time in life, single and about to be homeless. However, he has the ability to fight and utilises his skill to engage in a dangerous but well-paid illegal bout that offers him a chance to get back on his feet.

== Production ==
Principal photography began on 29 February 2016, with filming locations including Birmingham and Stoke-on-Trent.

== Release ==
The film was released on 12 May 2017 by Vertigo Films.

== Reception ==
On Rotten Tomatoes, the film has an approval rating of 96% based on 27 reviews, with an average rating of 7.23/10.

Wendy Ide of The Observer gave it 4 out of 5 and wrote: "The familiar boxing movie trajectory doesn't lessen the forceful punch of this underdog story."
