= A Gentleman in Moscow (TV series) =

2024 British television series

- Official poster
- Created by: Ben Vanstone
- Based on: A Gentleman in Moscow by Amor Towles
- Showrunner: Ben Vanstone
- Written by: Ben Vanstone; Nessah Muthy
- Directed by: Sam Miller; Sarah O'Gorman
- Starring: Ewan McGregor
- Composer: Federico Jusid
- Country of origin: United Kingdom
- Original language: English
- No. of episodes: 8

Production
- Executive producers: Tom Harper; Sharon Hughff; Pancho Mansfield; Xavier Marchand; Ewan McGregor; Sam Miller; Amor Towles; Ben Vanstone
- Producer: Lis Steele
- Cinematography: Adam Gillman
- Editor: Tim Murrell
- Running time: 48 minutes
- Production companies: Vanity Film & TV; Popcorn Storm Pictures; Moonriver Productions; Lionsgate Television; Paramount Television International Studios

Original release
- Network: Paramount+
- Release: 29 March – 17 May 2024

A Gentleman in Moscow is a British historical drama series based on the 2016 novel by Amor Towles. Ben Vanstone is writer, executive producer, and showrunner. The series stars Ewan McGregor in the role of Count Alexander Rostov and premiered on Paramount+ on 29 March 2024.

== Synopsis ==
After recently returning to Russia from Paris, aristocrat Count Alexander Ilyich Rostov spends decades banished to an attic hotel room following the October Revolution after being sentenced to house arrest by a Bolshevik tribunal.

== Cast ==
Main

- Ewan McGregor as Count Alexander Ilyich Rostov
- Mary Elizabeth Winstead as Anna Urbanova
- Fehinti Balogun as Mikhail "Mishka" Fyodorovich Mindich
- Daniel Cerqueira as Vasily
- Björn Hlynur Haraldsson as Emile Zhukovsky
- Johnny Harris as Osip Glebnikov
- Leah Harvey as Marina Samarova
- John Heffernan as "The Bishop" Leplevsky
- Anastasia Hille as Olga
- Lyès Salem as Andrey Duras

Recurring

- Leah Balmforth as Nina Kulikova
  - Alexa Goodall as Young Nina Kulikova
- Penny Downie as The Countess Rostova
- Lily Newmark as Helena Rostova
  - Matilda Hunt as Young Helena Rostova
- Dee Ahluwalia as Audrius
- Rob Jarvis as Halecki
- Charley Palmer Rothwell as Pulonov
- Gabriel Robinson as Yasha
  - Elliot Mugume as Yasha (10 years)
  - Mylo Rayne Pateman-Fannan as Yasha (4 years)
- Jason Forbes as Alexei Nachevko
- Beau Gadsdon as Sofia
  - Billie Gadsdon as Young Sofia
- Anna Madeley as Narrator (adult Sofia)

Guest stars

- Paul Ready as Prince Nikolai Petrov
- Dermot Crowley as Abram
- Josh Weller as Demetri
- Matthew Wynn as General Belsky
- Camilla Beeput as Freya Campbell
- Adam Fidusiewicz as Vladimir
- Inês Pires Tavares as Mila Federova
- Stephen Walters as Captain Abashev
- Lucian Msamati as Richard Vanderwhile
- Alexandra Moen as Gloria
- Sayyid El Alami as Ilya

== Episodes ==
No.	Title	Directed by	Written by	Original release date	U.S. viewers (millions)
1	"A Master of Circumstance"	Sam Miller	Teleplay by : Ben Vanstone	29 March 2024	0.068
In 1921, a Bolshevik tribunal sentences Count Alexander Rostov of Nizhny Novgorod to indefinite house arrest in the Hotel Metropol Moscow, where he has resided since 1918. Cheka officer Osip Glebnikov moves Rostov from a luxurious suite into the old servants' quarters. However, he may still use the hotel's services because he was promised room and board. Manager Halecki warns Rostov that the government uses the hotel to spy on wealthy guests and find traitors to the Communist Party. Nina Kulikova, a hotel employee's young daughter, is curious about Rostov's previous aristocratic life. As they form a friendship, she shows him the hotel's many hidden passages. Prince Nikolai Petrov, an old friend, asks Rostov to flee the country with him, using false passports. Rostov refuses due to old regrets, loyalty to his country, and not wanting to leave behind a cherished painting of his late sister, Helena. Petrov's plans are discovered, and, to Rostov's horror, soldiers execute him in the street.
2	"An Invitation"	Sam Miller	Ben Vanstone	5 April 2024	0.146
In 1922, shortly before the Soviet Union is officially established, Rostov reunites with Mikhail "Mishka" Mindich, who is an old college friend and pro-communist. Rostov feels guilty for ending a romance between Mindich and Helena, due to Mindich's lower social class. Rostov is also aware that Mindich spoke in support of his character to the tribunal. Silent film actress Anna Urbanova and Rostov have casual sex in her suite. He feels slighted when she takes a different man to her room the next night, though Rostov is unaware the man is Alexei Nachevko, a gay film producer who uses Anna as a beard. Rostov is pressured by Glebnikov to reveal information about Mindich's past, but he refuses. As a gesture of good will, Rostov gives Glebnikov his copy of War and Peace as an unofficial Christmas present, despite the holiday being outlawed. Before going to boarding school, Nina gifts Rostov a master key to the hotel, allowing him to go outdoors via the roof.
3	"The Last Rostov"	Sarah O'Gorman	Ben Vanstone; Based on the teleplay by: Stewart Harcourt	12 April 2024	0.113
In 1926 Joseph Stalin has risen to power following Lenin's death. A teenaged Nina returns from school, enthralled with communist ideals. Rostov learns that his beloved grandmother, the Countess Rostova, has died while living abroad. He plans a memorial dinner, despite warnings that it could be dangerous. Changes at the hotel distress Rostov as the USSR seeks to dismantle "monuments to privilege." Rostov and Anna rekindle their casual sexual relationship. Abram, the hotel's elderly caretaker, becomes upset when his bee colony disappears from the rooftop hive. Only Mindich and Nina attend Rostov's memorial dinner. Glebnikov menacingly reminds Rostov that he can always lose the last of his comforts. Rostov contemplates suicide but stops when Abram discovers the bee colony has returned; he asks Rostov to be the new beekeeper, and the count accepts. Meanwhile, Anna worries about her career when Stalin dislikes her latest film. She and Rostov find solace in each other's company.
4	"Good Times"	Sarah O'Gorman	Ben Vanstone; Based on the teleplay by: Susie Conklin	19 April 2024	0.168
In 1932, Rostov works as the maître d'hôtel for the Boyarsky restaurant. Despite the Great Depression in the capitalist West, the USSR's economy appears strong. As part of the Komsomol, Nina travels to Donetsk to assist in collectivization. Mindich refuses to censor Anton Chekhov’s private letters for publication, for which he is beaten and must hide in the hotel. He reveals to Rostov that there is a severe famine. The hotel remains unaffected due to the government keeping up appearances for foreigners. Glebnikov orders Rostov to report on one of his guests: Alexei Nachevko, the new Minister of Culture. Anna attempts to get a role in a prestigious new state film. Mindich and Rostov reflect upon how Rostov killed Helena's abusive lover, Pulonov, in a duel. As a result, Rostov was sent away and Helena later died by suicide. Mindich is arrested by Glebnikov's men. Rostov discovers Nachevko and General Belsky are not co-conspirators but secretly lovers. Rostov does not expose them, but Belsky is made into a scapegoat. In 1938, Nina's husband is sentenced to a workcamp and she plans to go with him. She leaves her daughter, Sofia, in Rostov's care.
5	"An Arrival"	Sarah O'Gorman	Ben Vanstone	26 April 2024	0.081
Rostov looks after Sofia, which proves to be a challenge since he is confined to the hotel. However, they bond and settle into a routine. Deputy Hotel Manager Leplevsky pushes his superior, Halecki, to send Sofia to an orphanage. Rostov convinces them to let her stay for a month, in the hope that Nina will soon return. Anna learns that she has been replaced by a younger actress, Mila Federova. Making peace with the realization that she is past her prime, she starts taking lower-profile roles in the Moscow theaters. Nazi Germany is mobilizing in Eastern Europe, making the Soviet Union fearful of war. Marina's and Andrey's sons leave to join the army. Leplevsky arranges for Sofia to be taken away, but Rostov and Halecki prevent this by falsifying a claim that she is Rostov's niece, allowing her to remain in the hotel. In Siberia, Nina's corpse is seen in a mass grave. An adult Sofia explains through voice-over that she never learned of her mother's fate despite searching for the rest of her life.
6	"The Fall"	Sam Miller	Nessah Muthy	3 May 2024	0.123
In 1947 Rostov struggles with being overly protective of the teenaged Sofia. While she runs up a stairway, the railing breaks, causing her to fall and fracture her skull. Rostov, in a panic, rushes her to the hospital. Leplevsky, who is now the hotel manager, alerts the authorities. Anna convinces the staff to tell Captain Abashev that they did not witness Rostov leaving the hotel and lies to the authorities that he spent the night with her. Glebnikov locates Rostov at the hospital, where Sofia undergoes surgery. Abashev's men arrive soon after, so Glebnikov, who has grown sympathetic to the count's situation, arranges for Rostov to escape in a bread truck. The staff help smuggle Rostov back into the hotel. When Rostov reappears in the lobby before Abashev, he is cleared of Leplevsky's accusations. Anna rents a room in the hotel so she can be closer to Rostov. Anna's mother figure, Olga, marries hotel concierge Vasily. After making a full recovery, Sofia plays the piano at Rostov's birthday celebration.
7	"An Assembly"	Sam Miller	Ben Vanstone	10 May 2024	0.091
In 1953 Sofia wins a piano contest and will tour Europe, including Paris. She chafes under Soviet censorship, which dictates what music she can play. Stalin dies, and a government dinner at the hotel will determine his successor. Rostov is asked by an American, Richard Vanderwhile, to spy on the meeting. Rostov agrees in exchange for Sofia being allowed to defect to the United States. Anna supports his decision and helps fit him with a wire. He records the meeting while working as a waiter. However, Sofia will have to deliver the tapes to the Embassy in Paris. Khrushchev is chosen to replace Stalin, which means the old order, including Glebnikov, will be "excised." Mindich is released from a workcamp, deeply traumatized and disillusioned. He stays briefly at the hotel, leaving behind a 1913 photo of himself and Rostov. On the back of the photo is a political poem Mindich wrote, but it was published under Rostov's name to protect Mindich. This deception saved Rostov from execution after the revolution.
8	"Adieu"	Sam Miller	Ben Vanstone	17 May 2024	0.121
Rostov, Anna, and Sofia make plans for Sofia to defect while she is on tour in Paris. Rostov and Anna promise to join her by traveling to Finland under stolen passports and then going to the US. Rostov tearfully bids Sofia farewell. Glebnikov warns Rostov that once she defects, the authorities will come after Rostov and Anna. Leplevsky discovers the stolen passports in Rostov's room. The count then forcibly chains Leplevsky up in the hotel boiler room. In Paris, Sofia disguises herself and barely escapes her chaperones. Anna plans to meet Rostov at the train station. Glebnikov tells her to take the train to Helsinki alone for her own safety, but she hesitates. Rostov learns that Sofia made it to the US Embassy when all the phones in the lobby start ringing simultaneously. He then walks out into the snowy night. In voice-over, Sofia says she neither saw nor heard from Rostov or Anna again, but she likes to believe they are together and free. Rostov and Anna are shown living on a small, picturesque Russian farm surrounded by black apple trees, similar to the fruit in a regional myth remembered by Rostov, heavily implying that the scene is not real.

== Production ==
=== Development ===
In August 2017 it was reported that a limited series based on the book was in development at Entertainment One. In April 2018, it was announced that Kenneth Branagh would star as Count Rostov in the television series, and that Tom Harper would direct it.

In August 2022 it was announced that Ewan McGregor had replaced Branagh in the role of Count Rostov, and that it would be released on Paramount+ internationally and Showtime in the US. In November 2022, it was revealed Sam Miller would direct and executive produce the project. Ben Vanstone was announced as writer, executive producer and show runner. Nessah Muthy has been a scriptwriter on the miniseries.

=== Casting ===
On 22 February 2023, McGregor's wife Mary Elizabeth Winstead was added to the cast as Anna Urbanova. In March 2023, Leah Harvey, Johnny Harris, Paul Ready, Alexa Goodall, John Heffernan, Lyès Salem, Fehinti Balogun, Björn Hlynur Haraldsson, Dee Ahluwalia and Anastasia Hille joined the cast.

=== Writing ===
A Gentleman in Moscow is adapted from the novel of the same name by Amor Towles. However, in a change from the book, the role of Anna Urbanova has been expanded in the series. Writer Ben Vanstone said that, while the "novel is necessarily very Count-focused", it does not give "that broad an impression of Anna's life away from the count". Vanstone said that a reason for expanding Anna's role was to give the character "more agency through the story".

=== Costumes ===
Ewan McGregor was involved in creating the look of Count Rostov alongside Sam Miller and Ben Vanstone. During the rehearsal period for the series in London, McGregor got his hair permed and dyed it dark brown. Over time, the color began to fade, which McGregor believed was "conducive to his aging". Similarly, Winstead initially portrays Anna with bleach-blonde hair, expensive outfits, and makeup; as the show progresses, she reverts to her natural brunette hair, wears more conservative clothes, and stops hiding the visible signs of her own aging.

=== Filming ===
Filming took place entirely in England. It began in Victoria Square outside Bolton Town Hall in Bolton, Greater Manchester, on 27 February 2023 and continued into March 2023, and returned in April 2023. Liverpool Town Hall was used as a filming location in June 2023. Filming also took place in Halifax, West Yorkshire and Leeds Civic Hall in May 2023, before it was suspended in July due to the 2023 SAG-AFTRA strike.

== Release ==
Amor Towles said in an interview that he expected a 2024 release date. It premiered on 29 March 2024.

== Reception ==
The review aggregator Rotten Tomatoes reported a 91% approval rating, based on 35 critic reviews, with an average rating of 7.2/10. The critic's consensus reads: "Illuminated by Ewan McGregor's debonair performance, A Gentleman in Moscow is a rewarding and whimsical portrait of a life blossoming under constraining circumstances." Metacritic assigned it a score of 74 out of 100, based on 21 critics, indicating "generally favorable reviews". Jack Seale of The Guardian awarded the first episode four stars out of five, praising McGregor's performance. Alison Herman of Variety praised McGregor but felt the series was 'padded' and questioned the use of its historic setting.

Ewan McGregor was nominated for Best Actor in a Limited Series at the 30th Critics' Choice Awards in February 2025. He was nominated for Golden Globe Award for Best Actor – Miniseries or Television Film at the 82nd Golden Globe Awards.
