= Without Sin =

British television drama

- Genre: Drama
- Created by: Frances Poletti
- Written by: Frances Poletti
- Starring: Vicky McClure
- Composer: Lindsay Wright
- Country of origin: United Kingdom
- Original language: English
- No. of series: 1
- No. of episodes: 4

Production
- Executive producers: Andy Harries; Johnny Harris; Vicky McClure; Sian McWilliams
- Producer: Guy Hescott
- Cinematography: Rachel Clark
- Production company: Left Bank Pictures

Original release
- Network: ITV
- Release: 28 December 2022

Without Sin is a four-part British television drama series, written by Frances Poletti. It stars Vicky McClure as a mother whose life becomes entangled with her daughter's killer. It began airing on 28 December 2022 ITVX, followed by broadcast on ITV on 15 May 2023. The series began airing on Acorn TV on 12 February 2024.

== Plot ==
Three years on from the death of her daughter, taxi driver Stella is still unable to move on. With her family life in tatters, she suddenly gets a message from the man who killed her child.

== Cast ==
- Vicky McClure as Stella
- Johnny Harris as Charles Stone
- Dorothy Atkinson as Jessie Cole
- Andrea Lowe as Bobbi Carter
- Johann Myers as Remy
- Ezra Faroque Khan as Kelvin
- Callum Fuller as Jamal Aboushi
- Grant Crookes as Prison Officer

== Episodes ==
No.	Title	Directed by	Written by	Original release date	UK viewers (millions)
1	"Episode 1"	Al Mackay	Frances Poletti	28 December 2022 (ITVX); 15 May 2023 (ITV)	3.82
2	"Episode 2"	Al Mackay	Frances Poletti	28 December 2022 (ITVX); 16 May 2023 (ITV)	3.38
3	"Episode 3"	Al Mackay	Frances Poletti	28 December 2022 (ITVX); 17 May 2023 (ITV)	3.25
4	"Episode 4"	Al Mackay	Frances Poletti	28 December 2022 (ITVX); 18 May 2023 (ITV)	2.83

== Reception ==
Rebecca Nicholson of The Guardian awarded the first episode four stars out of five, praising McClure's performance. Anita Singh in The Telegraph also gave it four stars out of five, praising the cast and evocation of the setting by Poletti. Nick Hilton of The Independent gave the first episode three out of five stars, finding it 'generic' and feeling it did not afford McClure new material as an actor.

== Awards ==
McClure was nominated at the 2023 British Academy Television Awards, for the British Academy Television Award for Best Actress for her performance.
