= Monsters: Dark Continent =

2014 British science fiction monster film

- Theatrical release poster
- Directed by: Tom Green
- Written by: Jay Basu; Tom Green
- Produced by: Allan Niblo; James Richardson
- Starring: Johnny Harris; Sam Keeley; Joe Dempsie
- Cinematography: Christopher Ross
- Edited by: Richard Graham
- Music by: Neil Davidge
- Production company: Vertigo Films
- Distributed by: Vertigo Films
- Release dates: 9 October 2014 (London Film Festival); 1 May 2015 (United Kingdom)
- Running time: 119 minutes
- Country: United Kingdom
- Language: English
- Box office: $52,750

Monsters: Dark Continent (also known as Monsters 2: Dark Continent or simply Monsters 2) is a 2014 British science fiction monster film directed by Tom Green and co-written by Green and Jay Basu. It is the sequel to 2010's Monsters, directed by Gareth Edwards. Due to commitments with Godzilla, Edwards did not return to direct, but served as an executive producer. Scoot McNairy and Whitney Able also do not reprise their roles from the first film and new characters were introduced. Filming began in March 2013, taking place in Jordan and Detroit (U.S.).

The film premiered at the BFI London Film Festival on 9 October 2014. Originally scheduled for a wide release on 28 November, the film was pushed back to 1 May 2015.

== Plot ==
Ten years after the events of the previous film, extraterrestrial life forms identical to those appeared in the Mexico–United States border region have spread to the Middle East.

Four closely knit friends from Detroit—Michael, Frankie, Inkelaar and new father Williams—are U.S. Army soldiers. After saying their goodbyes (and visiting a dog fight featuring an infant creature), the four are deployed to the Middle East for their first tour. Their job involves dealing with the creatures (dubbed "monsters") and a new insurgency. They meet their team leaders, Forrest and Frater.

On their first mission, they investigate a farm house and interrogate the owner. During the encounter, a gigantic monster wanders past the group and they gun it down.

Three months into their tour, the team receives a search and rescue mission for four soldiers in a particularly active area. On the way, an IED disables both of their vehicles and kills Forrest and two team members. Williams stumbles onto another IED and dies shortly after. The group is then set under fire by insurgents.

Leaving Williams' body, the four remaining escape on foot. After the team finds shelter, Inkelaar is killed by a sniper while Frankie is wounded. Surrounded by insurgents, Frater leads the others into surrendering. After being captured, Michael and Frater are bound and forced to watch Frankie bleeds to death. That night, Frater uses the distraction of an approaching creature to disarm and kill a guard. The two of them escape on motorcycles, determined to finish their mission.

After the bikes run out of gas, they continue eastward. As Frater searches for water, Michael encounters a boy who is barely alive. They are found by the locals, who take them to their settlement and feed them in gratitude for keeping the boy alive. Michael wanders around and witnesses one of the creatures spreading luminescent spores through the night time desert. Frater visits the boy, who succumbs to his injuries.

A frustrated Frater angrily reminds Michael of their mission, and the two continue east toward a settlement their men would have gone to. However, they discover there that the soldiers they were meant to rescue had all been killed prior to their arrival. Now enraged by the futility of their mission and the lives lost, Frater snaps and kills one of the villagers. Michael is forced to shoot him to keep him from killing the rest of the family.

Violent tremors prompt Frater to wander out of the village as Michael follows him to their extraction point. As an enormous creature emerges from the sands in front of them, Frater collapses and dies from his injury. The evac helicopter comes in and picks up Michael, who looks on in silence as the screen cuts to black.

== Cast ==
- Johnny Harris as Noah Frater
- Sam Keeley as Michael Parkes
- Joe Dempsie as Frankie Maguire
- Jesse Nagy as Ryan Conway
- Nicholas Pinnock as Sgt. Forrest
- Parker Sawyers as Shaun Williams
- Kyle Soller as Karl Inkelaar
- Sofia Boutella as Ara
- Michaela Coel as Kelly

== Production ==
The film is the first feature to be directed by Green, who previously had directed episodes of the Channel 4 television programme Misfits. Green wrote the screenplay with Jay Basu and the two had free rein to make what type of movie they wanted as long as it included monsters. Taking inspiration from the military presence in the first film, the two decided to make a war film that explored what Green termed "socially relevant themes". Gareth Edwards served as the film's executive producer, but the film's production ran concurrently with Edwards' own Godzilla, thus he could not contribute much to the actual film.

== Release ==
Vertigo Films premiered the film in London on 9 October 2014 as part of the BFI London Film Festival. Vertigo planned to release it in the United Kingdom on 28 November 2014 but delayed its release to 27 February 2015. The film was eventually released in the US on 17 April 2015 and in the UK on 1 May 2015.

== Reception ==
The film received mostly negative reviews. It earned a 17% score based on 35 reviews on aggregator Rotten Tomatoes; the consensus is: "Monsters: Dark Continent lacks the fresh approach and thought-provoking subtext of its predecessor, settling instead for tired war movie clichés." Peter Bradshaw of The Guardian called it "uncompromisingly boring and pointless". Kim Newman of Empire awarded it four stars, remarking, "In its fantastical way, this is one of the most believable, pointed and sober films about the wars of the 21st century." Neil Smith of Total Film awarded the film three out of five stars and said, "Ambitiously staged and impressively shot, Monsters: Dark Continent makes a bold stab at mounting a franchise but lacks the vision and surprise of its predecessor." Peter Debruge of Variety called it "a taxingly over-earnest war movie".
