= How Does That Make You Feel, Magda Eklund? =

2024 novel by Anna Montauge

- First edition cover
- Author: Anna Montague
- Language: English
- Publisher: HarperCollins / Ecco
- Publication date: October 22, 2024
- Publication place: United States
- Pages: 256
- ISBN: 978-0-06-335364-0

How Does That Make You Feel, Magda Eklund? is a 2024 debut novel by Anna Montague. The novel follows an aging psychiatrist who embarks on a road trip in honor of a deceased friend.

== Synopsis ==
Magda Eklund is a 70-year-old psychiatrist. After the death of Sara, her closest friend, she embarks on a road trip that Sara had planned for them prior to her death. During her journey, Eklund slowly comes to terms with the fact that her feelings for Sara may have transcended mere friendship.

== Development ==
Montague was inspired to write the book when her therapist dropped her as a patient in order to travel. Her therapist served as inspiration for the book's title character, with Montague also drawing inspiration from people she had met through her volunteer work for SAGE, an organization providing support to older queer people.

=== Publication history ===
The novel was published in the United States on October 22, 2024 by HarperCollins and Ecco Press.

== Reception ==
Kirkus Reviews and Library Journal both published positive reviews, with the former praising the novel's humor and sensitivity towards Magda's journey of self-discovery and the latter positively describing the book's characters. The Associated Press praised the novel for breaking the mold of coming-out novels by focusing on an older woman. A review in the Minnesota Star Tribune praised the book's humor but criticized the prose for being long-winded. Publishers Weekly was also more measured, describing the story as being "delightful if uneven."
