= The Lincoln Highway (novel) =

2021 novel by Amor Towles

- Author: Amor Towles
- Genre: Historical fiction Literary fiction
- Publisher: Viking Press
- Publication date: October 5, 2021
- Pages: 588
- ISBN: 9780735222359

The Lincoln Highway is a 2021 novel by American author Amor Towles. Set in 1954, it tells the story of four young men on a roadtrip from Nebraska to New York City over ten days. Each chapter is written from the perspective of one of the characters.

== Plot ==
Emmett Watson returns home to Morgen, Nebraska, after serving 18 months of a sentence at a work farm in Salina, Kansas. He is released early following his father's death and reunites with his younger brother, Billy. They are soon joined by Duchess and Woolly, two friends of Emmett's from Salina who stowed away in the warden's car.

Emmett runs into the brother of the boy he had accidentally killed. The brother punches him, but Emmett doesn't retaliate, hoping this will settle the matter. Later, Duchess violently assaults a boy who had egged on the attack.

Billy tells Emmett about the Lincoln Highway, which runs from Times Square in New York to San Francisco, where Billy believes their mother, who left the family years earlier, now lives. With their house facing foreclosure, the brothers decide to drive Billy's blue Studebaker to San Francisco, hoping to find their mother at an Independence Day fireworks show. They agree to drop Duchess and Woolly off in Omaha.

During a stop at Duchess' childhood foster home, Duchess and Woolly steal Emmett's car and head for New York, where Duchess has debts to settle and Woolly expects to claim a $150,000 trust at his family's upsate estate. Determined to recover the car, Emmett and Billy freighthop east, planning to retrieve it so they can drive to San Francisco. On the train they meet Ulysses, a man drifting through boxcars, longing to reunite with the wife and son who left him after he enlisted and served in World War II.

En route to New York, Duchess makes a detour to the home of former Salina warden Ackerly, and attacks him with a cast-iron pan. Once in New York City, he tracks down Townhouse, who was once beaten by that same warden, an incident Duchess blames himself for. Duchess asks Townhouse to hit him as a way of settling the debt; Townhouse punches him three times while Duchess offers no resistance.

Emmett and Billy arrive soon after. Drawing on stories Duchess once told about the talent agents who represented his father, a vaudeville actor known for Shakespearean roles, Emmett tracks the pair down at a Brooklyn circus. Duchess, delighted to see them, arranges for Emmett to visit a prostitute as a gesture of goodwill.

The group then seeks out Professor Abernathe, author of an epic-journey compendium that Billy is obsessed with. Abernathe is captivated by Billy's story and asks to meet Ulysses, who is also in New York.

Duchess and Woolly make their way to Woolly's family estate, where they locate the safe Woolly believes holds his inheritance. Without the combination, Duchess struggles for hours to force it open. When Emmett and Billy arrive, Billy quickly deduces the combination from stories Woolly had shared about his family. The vault is opened and found to contain the promised money. Soon after, Woolly is discovered dead in an upstairs bedroom having taken his own life.

Eager to start their journey to San Francisco, Emmett and Billy want to ensure Duchess doesn't follow. A fight breaks out between Emmett and Duchess, and the brothers leave him unconscious in a leaky rowboat on the lake. Unable to keep the boat afloat and unable to swim, Duchess drowns, his final thoughts drifting to an imagined Shakespearean performance, filled with love and respect for Emmett.

== Characters ==
=== Emmett Watson ===
Emmett's perspective is told in the third person. Emmett was raised in Morgen, Nebraska, by his father after his mother left. At 15, he became a carpenter's assistant, purposely avoiding the hazardous weather-dependent nature of farming. After a local troublemaker, Jimmy Snyder, taunts him about his father, Emmett punches him and Jimmy later dies after hitting his head in the fall. Emmett admits his guilt at a court hearing, thereby avoiding a trial. Sent to Salina, a Kansas youth facility, for 18 months for manslaughter, Emmett is released early on compassionate grounds when his father passes away. Emmett owns a blue 1948 Studebaker Land Cruiser — his absolute pride and joy.

=== Billy Watson ===
Emmett's eight-year-old younger brother. Upon his father's death, he discovers a metal box containing postcards from their estranged mother. He wants to go to San Francisco, where he believes their mother may be living as it was the last place she sent a postcard from. He wants to go via the Lincoln Highway — a highway built in 1912 that runs across America from New York City to Lincoln Park in San Francisco. Billy remembers his mother's love of fireworks and is convinced she will be at the Fourth of July fireworks in Lincoln Park. Billy collects silver dollar coins in an old blue tobacco tin with the portrait of George Washington on it. He carries around a book with him, “Abacus Abernathe's Compendium of Heroes, Adventurers and Other Intrepid Travellers” that he has read many times.

“When it came to rules, Billy wasn't simply an abider. He was a stickler.” (Emmett)

=== Daniel “Duchess” Hewett ===
Duchess's perspective is told in a first-person narrative. Duchess escapes from Salina with fellow inmate Woolly by slipping into the trunk of the warden's car, which is transporting Emmett home. He has a fascination with masters of deception such as an escape artist named Kazantikis, and is fond of embellishment and exaggeration. His dream is to open up his own restaurant. Duchess's father, Harrison Hewett, who was a travelling actor and unscrupulous conman, inspired Duchess's love of performance. When Duchess was eight, Harrison abandoned him at St. Nicholas' home for boys. Later, he is framed for theft, leading him to be sent to Salina. After listening to a talk about finances, Duchess adopts the idea of people being in debt to each other through their misdeeds and that "the only way to get a good night's sleep is to balance the accounts.” He uses this to justify his acts of revenge on those he feels have done wrong.

"I love surprises, I love it when life pulls a rabbit out of a hat." (Duchess)

"If you want to understand a man's motivations, all you have to do is ask him 'what would you do with fifty thousand dollars?’" (Duchess)

"There is a goodness in him, a goodness that has been there from the beginning, but which has never had the chance to fully flourish." (Sister Agnes)

"He's a loyal friend in his own crazy way...But he is also like one of those guys who are born with no peripheral vision....And that can lead to all kinds of trouble." (Townhouse)

"When it comes to vaudeville, it's all about the setup." (Duchess)

=== Wallace Wolcott "Woolly" Martin ===
Woolly's perspective is told in a third-person narrative. Raised in a wealthy and well-connected family on the Upper East Side, New York, Woolly has had to leave boarding school three times — St. Paul's, St. Mark's and St. Georges’. At St. Marks, he got so stressed having to use a thesaurus he set fire to it on the football field and the fire spread to the goal posts. At St. Georges, he came across a fire engine and returned it to the station, not realizing the firefighters were in the grocery store. This led to them not being able to attend an emergency fire at a stable and, consequently, Woolly was sent to Salina. His grandfather left him some money in a trust fund, but Woolly is declared temporarily unfit to receive it. Woolly's great grandfather puts $150,000 in cash in a wall safe in the family 'camp', a house in upstate New York, which Duchess and Woolly are hoping to find. Woolly is often slow to understand, acts impulsively without logic, has an addiction to drugs, and has simple fascinations, making him vulnerable to exploitation.

"There's something about all that good fortune that can become too much." (Duchess)

"When father accepted his commission in the navy, it was Woolly who ended up at sea." (Sarah).

"It seems to me that so many of our lives end up being hampered by a virtue...If you take a trait that by all appearances is a merit....and you give it to some poor soul in abundance, it will almost certainly prove an obstacle to their happiness." (Sarah)

=== Sarah Witney ===
One of Woolly's sisters, who understands Woolly's nature and shows him compassion. She is married to Dennis.

"Sarah was the only one in Woolly's family who said she was sorry and meant it."

=== Ulysses Dixon ===
A man in his forties who served in World War II in the 92nd Infantry Division under the Fifth Army in the Italian Campaign. His wife Macie does not forgive him for enlisting and moves away, taking their newborn son with her. Ulysses takes to riding freight trains across the country, never settling anywhere, and that is how he comes to save Billy from the predatory Pastor John.

"Everything of value in this life must be earned...one should also earn the right to hope." (Ulysses)

=== Townhouse ===
An inmate at Salina who was persuaded by Duchess to sneak out one night to see a movie. Duchess unwittingly hitched a ride home with an off-duty cop, which led to Townhouse getting caught and publicly beaten by Warden Ackerly.

=== Mr. Ransom ===
A ranch owner and long-standing neighbor of the Watsons, he takes Billy into his care after Charlie Watson dies and Emmett is sent to Salina.

=== Sally Ransom ===
Mr. Ransom's daughter, who lost her mother at the age of 12. She prides herself on caring for others, especially the Watson brothers, and likes to take time to do things properly.

"Kindness begins where necessity ends." (Sally)

=== Professor Abacus Abernathe ===
The author of Billy's beloved book. Abacus (formerly known as Sam) developed a childhood interest in shipwrecks, which led to an interest in explorers. He is inspired by his meeting with Billy to meet Ulysses and go and have an adventure of his own.

"How easily we forget — we in the business of storytelling — that life was the point all along." (Abacus)

=== Charlie Watson ===
Emmett and Billy's father, an unsuccessful farmer who dies of cancer. He leaves behind debts which cause the bank to repossess the family home, leaving his sons homeless. He came to Nebraska from Boston in 1933. He leaves Emmett a note of apology, a torn page from Ralph Waldo Emerson's “Essays”, and about $3,000 hidden in the trunk of Emmett's car.

=== Jimmy Snyder ===
Killed by a fall following a punch from Emmett.

"In his seventeen years, he was the engineer of a lifetime of shit piles." (Mr Ransom)

"He liked running people down whether he knew them or not."

=== Warden Ackerly ===
A warden at Salina who is inclined to beating the young men with his stick.

== Reception ==
Heller McAlpin in a review for NPR called it "elegantly constructed and endlessly readable". Alex Preston praised "Towles's near-magical gift for storytelling [and] ability to construct a cast of characters at once flawed, lovable and fascinating." Chris Bachelder commented on the novel being "remarkably brisk, remarkably buoyant" and possessing an "episodic, exuberant narrative haywire found in myth or Homeric epic".

It was named a "Notable Book" by The New York Times and a "Book of the Year" by Time and NPR as well as Barack Obama and Oprah Daily. The Washington Post named it one of the 50 most notable fiction books of 2021. Bill Gates recommended it as a summer read in 2022.

== Film adaptation ==
Reports of a film adaptation first came in May 2026. Christopher Storer is attached to direct with Tom Holland set to star in the film and David Heyman producing. The film is being developed under Warner Bros., but they have not greenlit the project yet possibly due to the proposed acquisition of Warner Bros. Discovery by Paramount Skydance. A source from WB said that Storer and Heyman are allowed to look for a new distributor for the project.
