= Table for Two =

2024 short story collection by Amor Towles

- Author: Amor Towles
- Language: English
- Genre: Short story collection
- Publisher: Viking Press
- Publication date: April 2024
- Media type: Print (hardcover)
- Pages: 464 pp.
- ISBN: 978-0593296370
- Dewey Decimal: 813/.6
- LC Class: PS3620.O945T33 2024

Table for Two is a collection of six short stories and a novella by the novelist Amor Towles. It was published by Viking Press in April 2024. The book is divided into two parts, with the six short stories connected to New York City and the novella set in Los Angeles.

The six short stories include tales about a Russian peasant who waits in lines and an aspiring author who becomes embroiled in a literary con. The novella centers on a character from one of Towles previous novels, Rules of Civility. The short stories received positive reviews from critics. The novella received mixed reviews.

== Writing and development ==
Towles first began writing short stories in high school and college, early experiences that he described as preparing him to develop Table for Two. The writing process for Table for Two involved Towles working at his desk for about four hours each morning. In the afternoon, he often sat at the bar of a restaurant to revise his work. During the drafting of the book, Towles stayed for a week at The Beverly Hills Hotel. In an interview with NPR, he described the stay as helping him to set the mood for his novella, Eve in Hollywood, which is set in the same city as the hotel, Los Angeles. Towles also talked with NPR about his decision to name the book Table for Two, stating the following:

I was preparing to hand in the manuscript to my publisher, and I really didn't have a title at that time... What really leapt out at me was that in almost every story and in Eve, there are critical moments where there are two central characters sitting across from each other at a small table, often in a kitchen, and hashing out some significant element of their lives which has come to the surface through the events of that particular story.

One of the stories in Table for Two is partly autobiographical. In an interview, Towles recounted feeling incensed after observing a guest recording a performance at Carnegie Hall in violation of the facility's rules. That memory inspired the fifth story in the collection, Bootlegger.

== Contents ==
=== The Line ===
A simple, kindhearted man named Pushkin is uprooted from his life as a peasant in the countryside. He moves to Moscow at the behest of his wife, Irina, who wants to participate in the Russian Revolution. In the city, a woman asks Pushkin to hold her place in one of the many long lines for household staples. The amiable Pushkin agrees, asking nothing in return, but the woman rewards him with candies. This scenario repeats itself many times, and soon, Pushkin finds himself the recipient of many tokens of appreciation. Later, he holds a place in line for a man desiring a visa to leave the Soviet Union. To pass the time while holding the place, Puskin fills out a visa application for himself, in which he writes about his love for the Russian countryside. Pushkin ends up accidentally submitting the form, and it is approved by officials who find his responses moving. The visa enables Pushkin and his wife to travel to New York City, where they become separated. A lost Pushkin stumbles upon a queue for a soup kitchen, taking comfort in the familiarity of a line.

=== The Ballad of Timothy Touchett ===
Timothy is a recent college graduate who aspires to become a novelist. His ability to write, however, is impeded by self-doubt. He worries that he has no story to tell due to a lack of life experience, and he reflects that most great writers had some formative hardship that inspired their novels, such as living through war or great personal loss. Meanwhile, Timothy obtains a job at a bookstore that deals in rare editions of novels, and one day, the purveyor asks him to forge an author's signature in a book, claiming that it is for a dying friend who covets a signed edition. Similar requests follow and eventually Timothy finds himself in an illicit partnership in which he executes the forged signatures and the purveyor sells the copies at a large markup. The scheme comes undone when a living author discovers a forgery of his signature by the pair. The police come to arrest Timothy for fraud and to take him to Rikers Island, a place where Timothy can finally get the life experience he craved.

=== Hasta Luego ===
Two strangers meet in the airport following the cancellation of flights due to a snowstorm. The narrator, Jerry, is emotionally removed, while the other man, Smith, is sincere and gregarious. They share a cab to a hotel, where Smith reluctantly agrees to sit at the bar. Smith begins drinking heavily, breaking a one-year sobriety. Jerry gets a call from Smith's wife, who implores Jerry to prevent Smith from drinking further. Throughout the rest of the story, Jerry surprises himself by going to great lengths to make sure Smith gets on his plane home without incident.

=== I Will Survive ===
John is a prominent lawyer in his sixties with a secret: he likes to roller skate in the park with a group of other men. The group gives John the moniker Gloria because he skates to the song I will Survive by Gloria Gaynor. John does not tell his wife, Peggy, about his hobby out of embarrassment, instead telling her that he is playing squash. Peggy becomes suspicious of his whereabout, but she does not want to know his real activities, preferring to remain blissfully unaware. Her daughter, Nell, follows John and uncovers his hobby, which she reveals in a video to Peggy. The seemingly innocuous video causes a rift in the marriage of John and Peggy, eventually contributing to their divorce. Nell must reckon with her culpability in the dissolution of the marriage, following her reveal of the video.

=== The Bootlegger ===
Tommy becomes increasingly frustrated each time he sees another patron, an old man, surreptitiously recording performances at Carnegie Hall. He views the old man's actions as a distraction and as an affront to the rules of the institution. Tommy causes a scene when he brings the recordings to the attention of an usher. Consequently, the old man receives an indefinite ban from Carnegie Hall and before leaving, he tells Tommy that he was doing the recordings for his bedridden wife. Tommy feels terrible and tracks the old man down to apologize. He is confronted by the old man's daughter, who curses Tommy for his actions.

=== The DiDomenico Fragment ===
Retired Renaissance art specialist, Percival Skinner, lunches at the same Manhattan restaurant every day, seeing the same people there, and visits the Yale Club, dodging the entry fees. His world is upended with a visit from an art dealer looking to buy up fragments of a famous DiDomenico painting once owned by Percy's family. Percy’s great-grandfather, Valentine Skinner, bought the original Renaissance painting in 1888 and, unsure of which son to leave it to in his will, cut it into four and gave each a piece. Subsequent generations of Skinners did the same. The painting thus ended up in many pieces, most sold off by individual family members over time. Having sold his own three-inch square fragment to a Texan, Percy sees the opportunity to source another piece from one of his relatives. He negotiates a finders’ fee with the art dealer that will aid his straitened circumstances. Percy’s search brings him into the orbit of his extended family after some years. However, things don’t quite work out as he plans.

== Reception ==
The book received mostly positive reviews. Writing for The Los Angeles Times, Leigh Haber described the book as "filled with drama, wit, erudition and, most of all, heart". Haber praised the development of the characters, especially the arc of the protagonist in the story Hasta Luego. For the Star Tribune, Chris Hewitt called the book "incredibly satisfying, old-fashioned storytelling with characters you care about". In The New York Times, Herbert Cain called the book a "winner". He commended the novella, Eve in Hollywood, for its sharp rendering of the 1930s and for its plot.

Other critics disliked Eve in Hollywood, with Eric Olsen of The Washington Post describing it as the only piece in the collection in which Towles faltered. Olsen viewed the piece as excessively sentimental and as containing too many overly detailed backstories. In The Wall Street Journal, Joanne Kaufman also expressed dissatisfaction with the novella, calling it a "self-indulgent brand extension". Her comment referred to Towles's revisiting of a character from his previous novel, Rules of Civility. Kaufman criticized the book overall as having "a tone that rarely varies and characters who rarely convince". She viewed the stakes as low and disliked when characters broke the fourth wall in the narration.
