= Von Norden rollt ein Donner =

2024 novel by Markus Thielemann

- Author: Markus Thielemann
- Language: German
- Publisher: C. H. Beck
- Publication date: 11 July 2024
- Publication place: Germany
- Pages: 287
- ISBN: 978-3-406-82247-6

Von Norden rollt ein Donner (lit. 'From North Rolls a Thunder') is a 2024 novel by the German writer Markus Thielemann. It is set in the Lüneburg Heath and follows a young sheep farmer and his family as the return of wolves to the area leads to political tensions and intermingling with nationalist and populist currents. The publisher C. H. Beck labels the book as an anti-Heimat novel.

It was one of the six books shortlisted for the 2024 German Book Prize.
