= Gareth Edwards (filmmaker) =

British filmmaker

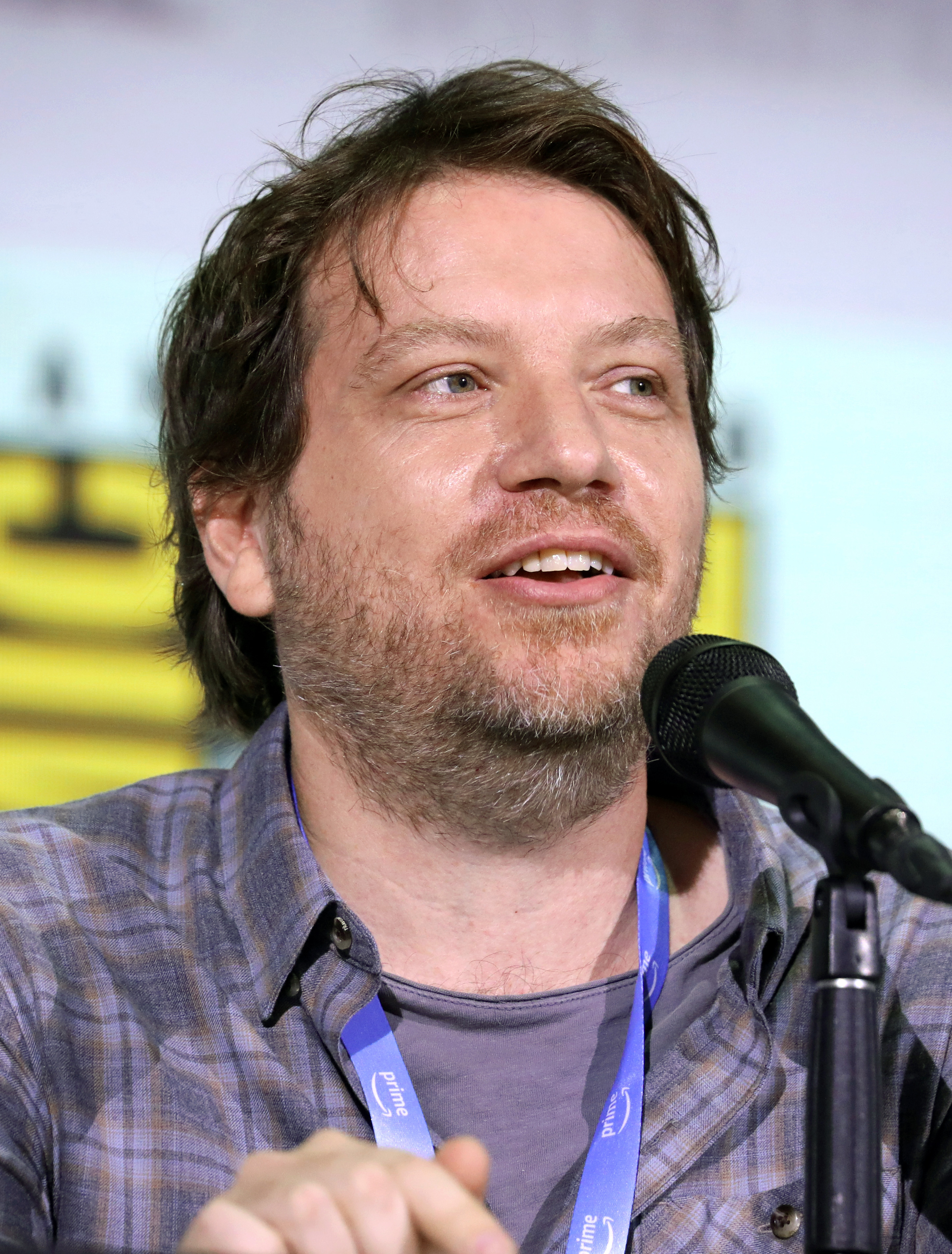
- Edwards at the 2023 San Diego Comic-Con
- Born: Gareth James Edwards; 1975 (age 50–51); Nuneaton, Warwickshire, England
- Occupations: Film director; screenwriter; cinematographer; visual effects artist
- Years active: 2002–present

Gareth James Edwards (born 1975) is a British filmmaker. His accolades include three British Independent Film Awards and nominations for the British Academy Film Awards and Primetime Emmy Awards.

Edwards first gained recognition for Monsters (2010), an independent film in which he served as writer, director, cinematographer, and visual effects artist. He subsequently directed the big-budget science fiction films Godzilla (2014), Rogue One: A Star Wars Story (2016), The Creator (2023) and Jurassic World Rebirth (2025).

== Career ==
Gareth Edwards was born to Welsh parents. Edwards had wanted to direct his own films since childhood, stating that "Star Wars is definitely the reason that I wanted to become a filmmaker", having grown up in England loving and studying Steven Spielberg's films and learning to storyboard and do special effects after watching a documentary about the making of Indiana Jones and the Temple of Doom at age 10. He attended Higham Lane School, followed by college at North Warwickshire College of Technology and Art (now NWSLC), completing a BTEC National Diploma in Audio Visual Studies under lecturers such as Graham Bird. Edwards studied film and video at the Surrey Institute of Art & Design, University College in Farnham, graduating in 1996. In 2012, he received an honorary Master of Arts from UCA. Edwards got his start in visual effects, creating digital effects for shows including Nova, Perfect Disaster and Heroes and Villains, for which he created 250 visual effects. In 2008, he entered the Sci-Fi-London 48-hour film challenge, for which a film had to be created start-to-finish in two days and within certain criteria. Edwards won the contest with his short film Factory Farmed and went on to write and direct Monsters, his first feature. Edwards created the visual effects for Monsters using off-the-shelf equipment. Besides the two main actors, the crew consisted of just five people.

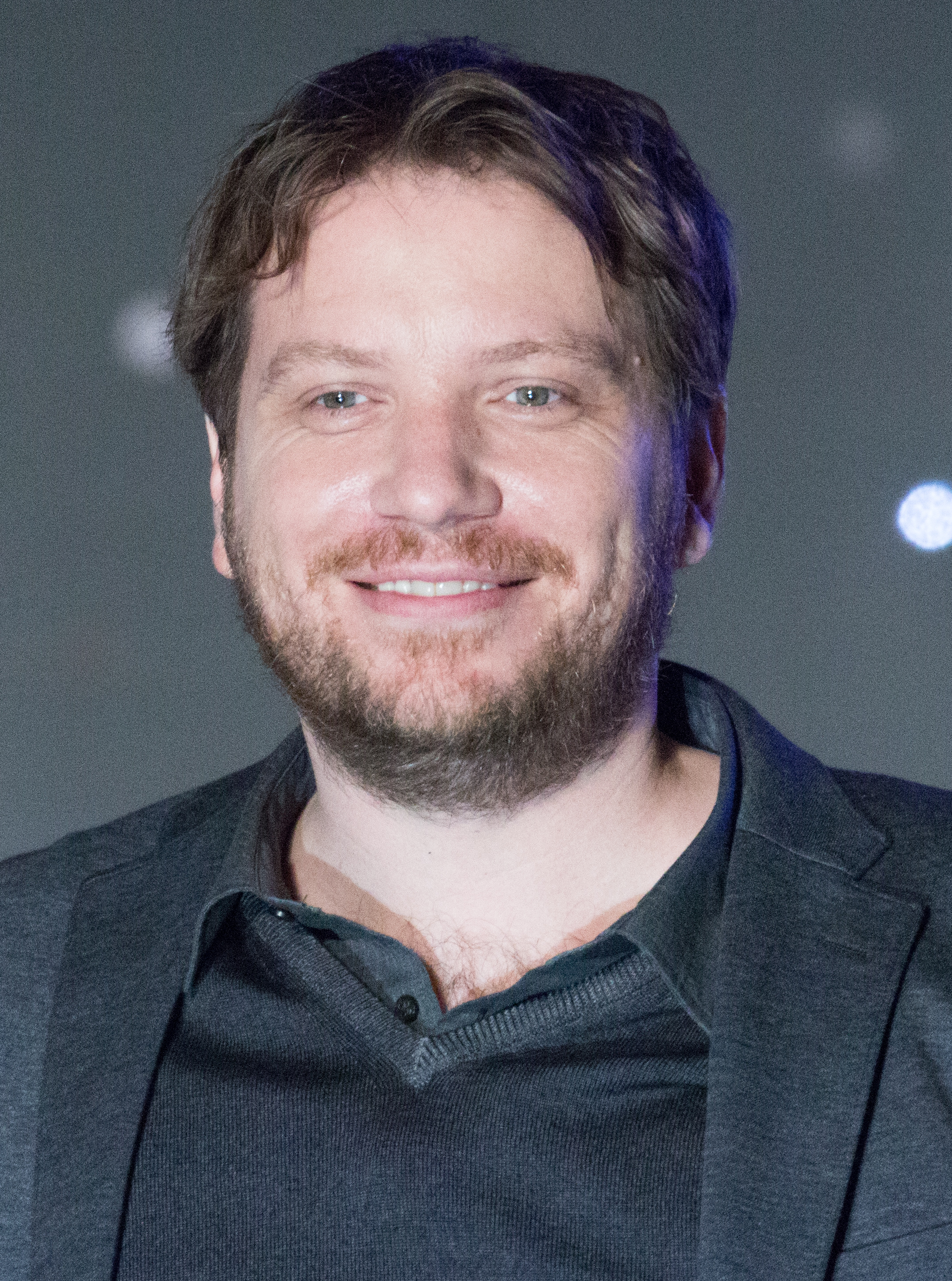
Edwards at the Japan premiere for Rogue One in 2016

The success of Monsters brought sufficient awareness in Hollywood to land his first major projects. After the film's release, he had interviews with several studios, including Legendary Pictures. In January 2011, Edwards got his first major feature deal, to direct the 2014 Godzilla reboot from Warner Bros. and Legendary Pictures.

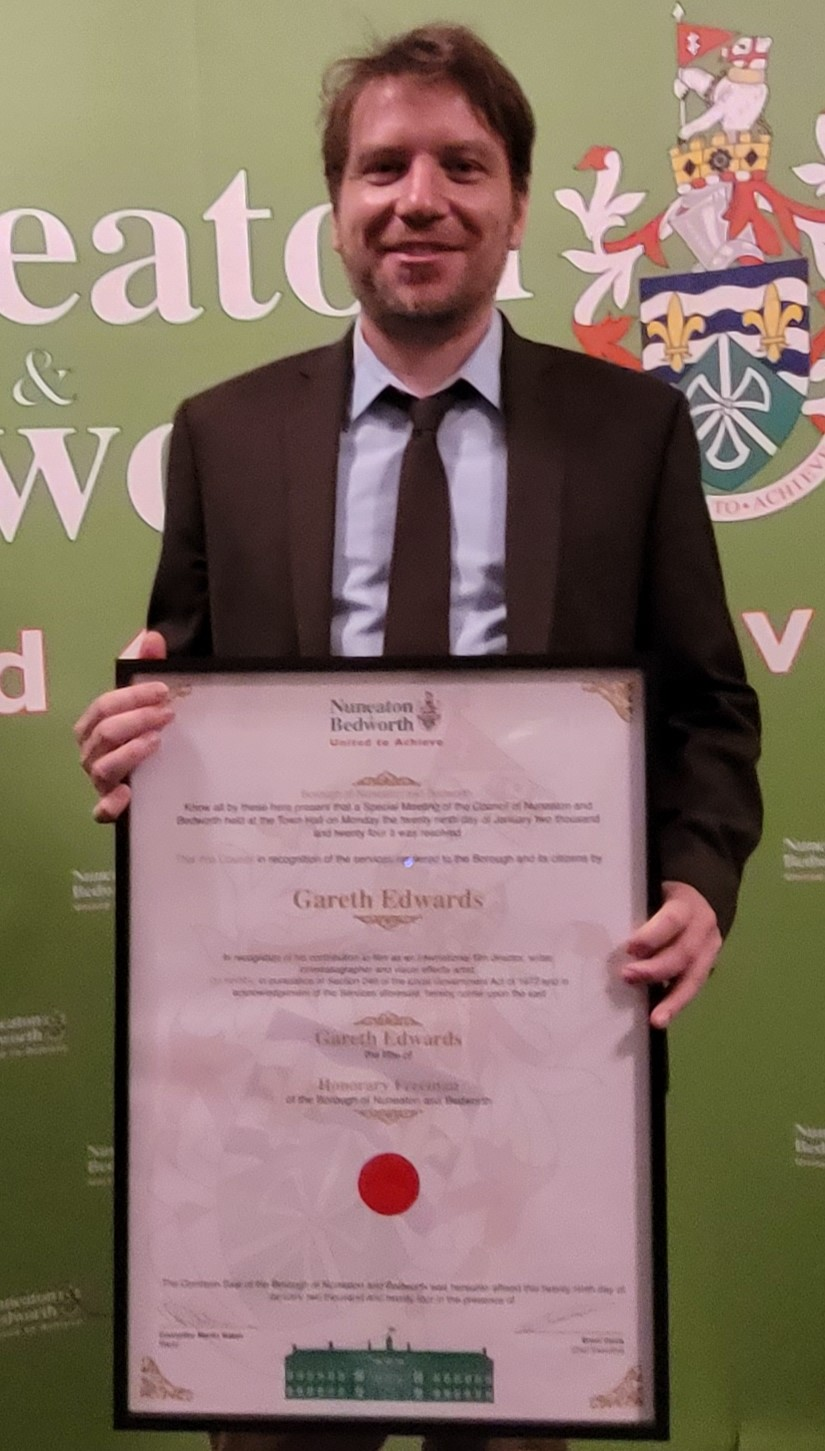
Edwards with his certificate naming him as a Freeman of the Borough of Nuneaton & Bedworth

Edwards directed Rogue One, the first Star Wars stand-alone film, written by Chris Weitz and Tony Gilroy, based on a story by John Knoll and Gary Whitta, starring Felicity Jones, and released on 16 December 2016.

Three of his influences for filmmaking are George Lucas, Steven Spielberg and Quentin Tarantino. In May 2016, Edwards exited Godzilla: King of the Monsters in an amicable split with the studio to work on smaller scale projects.

In February 2020, it was reported that Edwards was set to direct and write a film with the working titled True Love for New Regency, with Rogue One co-producer Kiri Hart serving as producer for the project. The film has since been renamed and released in 2023 as The Creator. The film stars John David Washington. It marked his second collaboration with Rogue One cinematographer Greig Fraser and his first collaboration with composer Hans Zimmer. It was released on 29 September 2023.

On 29 January 2024, Edwards was named as an honorary Freeman of the borough in his hometown of Nuneaton by Nuneaton and Bedworth Borough Council during a civic awards ceremony at the Town Hall.

In February 2024, it was reported that Edwards was set to direct Jurassic World Rebirth for Universal Pictures scheduled for 2 July 2025. Edwards replaced David Leitch, who had left the project over creative differences with the studio.

== Filmography ==
=== Film ===
Year	Title	Director	Writer	Notes
2010	Monsters	Yes	Yes	Also director of photography, visual effects and production designer
2014	Godzilla	Yes	No	
2016	Rogue One: A Star Wars Story	Yes	No	Cameo role: Rebel Soldier who uncouples the Tantive IV
2023	The Creator	Yes	Yes	Also producer and camera operator
2025	Jurassic World Rebirth	Yes	No	

Short film

Year	Title	Director	Writer	Notes
2008	Factory Farmed	Yes	Yes	Also cinematographer and editor

Other credits

Year	Title	Role	Notes
2007	In the Shadow of the Moon	Digital rostrum	Documentary film
2014	Monsters: Dark Continent	Executive producer	
2017	Star Wars: The Last Jedi	Resistance Trench Soldier	Cameo role

=== Television ===
TV movie

Year	Title	Director	Writer
2005	End Day	Yes	Yes

Documentary series

Year	Title	Notes
2006	Perfect Disaster	Episodes "Super Tornado" and "Solar Storm"; Also visual effects supervisor
2008	Heroes and Villains	Episode "Attila the Hun"

Other credits

Year	Title	Role	Notes
2002–2003	Nova	Animator	2 episodes
2003	Seven Wonders of the Industrial World	Visual effects	7 episodes
2004	Dive to Bermuda Triangle	Digital effects	TV movie
2005	Hiroshima	Digital artist	TV movie
2005	Space Race	Digital effects designer / Digital effects artist	2 episodes
2005	UFO's: The Secret Evidence	Visual effects supervisor	TV movie

== Awards and nominations ==
Year	Award	Category	Nominated work	Result	Ref
2005	RTS Craft and Design Awards	Best Visual Effects - Digital Effects	End Day	Nominated	
2006	British Academy Television Craft Awards	British Academy Television Craft Award for Best Special, Visual & Graphic Effects	Hiroshima	Won	
2006	Primetime Emmy Awards	Outstanding Special Visual Effects	Perfect Disaster - Super Tornado	Nominated	
2008	RTS Craft and Design Awards	Best Visual Effects - Digital Effects	Heroes and Villains - "Attila the Hun"	Nominated	
2010	6th Austin Film Critics Association Awards	Best First Film	Monsters	Won	
2010	13th British Independent Film Awards	Best British Independent Film	Monsters	Nominated	
2010	13th British Independent Film Awards	Douglas Hickox Award	Monsters	Nominated	
2010	13th British Independent Film Awards	Best Achievement In Production	Monsters	Won	
2010	13th British Independent Film Awards	Best Technical Achievement	Monsters	Won	
2010	13th British Independent Film Awards	Best Director	Monsters	Won	
2010	National Board of Review	Top Ten Independent Films	Monsters	Won	
2010	Puchon International Fantastic Film Festival	Best Director	Monsters	Won	
2010	Sitges Film Festival	Best Special Effects	Monsters	Won	
2010	SXSW Film Festival	Audience Award	Monsters	Nominated	
2010	14th Toronto Film Critics Association Awards	Best First Feature	Monsters	Runner-up	
2011	Evening Standard British Film Awards	Breakthrough Filmmaker	Monsters	Won	
2011	IGN Movie Awards	Best Sci-Fi Movie	Monsters	Nominated	
2011	37th Saturn Awards	Best International Film	Monsters	Won	
2011	37th Saturn Awards	Best DVD Special Edition	Monsters	Nominated	
2011	64th British Academy Film Awards	Outstanding Debut by a British Writer, Director or Producer	Monsters	Nominated	
2011	31st London Film Critics Circle Awards	British Film of the Year	Monsters	Nominated	
2011	31st London Film Critics Circle Awards	Breakthrough British/Irish Filmmaker	Monsters	Won	
2011	16th Empire Awards	Best British Film	Monsters	Nominated	
2011	16th Empire Awards	Best Newcomer	Monsters	Nominated	
2011	6th Scream Awards	Best Science Fiction Movie	Monsters	Nominated	
2011	6th Scream Awards	Best Independent Movie	Monsters	Won	
2011	Trieste Science+Fiction Festival	Asteroide Award	Monsters	Won	
2011	Russian National Movie Awards	Georges Special Prize	Monsters	Won	
2014	Rondo Hatton Classic Horror Awards	Best Film	Godzilla	Nominated	
2015	Fangoria Chainsaw Awards	Best Wide-Release Film	Godzilla	Nominated	
2017	Dragon Awards	Best Science Fiction or Fantasy Movie	Rogue One: A Star Wars Story	Nominated	
2017	Empire Awards	Best Director	Rogue One: A Star Wars Story	Won	
2017	Hugo Awards	Best Dramatic Presentation - Long Form	Rogue One: A Star Wars Story	Nominated	
2017	Nebula Awards	Ray Bradbury Award for Outstanding Dramatic Presentation	Rogue One: A Star Wars Story	Nominated	
2017	Saturn Awards	Best Film Direction	Rogue One: A Star Wars Story	Won	
