= The Bookshop (Friss book) =

2024 book by Evan Friss

- Author: Evan Friss
- Language: English
- Genre: Nonfiction
- Publisher: Viking Press
- Publication date: August 6, 2024
- Publication place: United States
- Pages: 416
- ISBN: 978-0-593-29992-0

The Bookshop: A History of the American Bookstore is a 2024 book by Evan Friss.

== Synopsis ==
The Bookshop is a narrative overview of the history of independent bookstores in the United States. Each chapter focuses on a different bookstore, describing its history, contributions to its local community, and eventual decline. There are intermissions throughout the book looking at the bookselling industry more broadly. Bookstores described in the book include Boston's Old Corner Bookstore, Chicago's Marshall Field & Company, and New York's Oscar Wilde Bookshop.

== Development ==
Evan Friss is a professor of history at James Madison University, where he focuses on American urban history and public history. Friss was inspired to write the book by his wife, who owned a bookstore in Harrisonburg, Virginia.

=== Publication history ===
The Bookshop was published in the United States by Viking Press on August 6, 2024.

== Reception ==
Kirkus Reviews described the book positively, specifically noting Friss' balanced review of independent and corporate bookstores. Publishers Weekly, in a starred review, praised the book's narrative for being "upbeat and immersive" and for providing a "behind-the-scenes" look into bookselling as an industry. Shelf Awareness credited the book with making an argument that bookstores act as third places and have historically been sites for social change.

Michael Dirda, writing in The Washington Post, praised Friss' research and the variety of his examples. Dirda wrote that "Friss organizes his chapters around book people" and that Friss was "clear-eyed" about the problems facing bookselling. The New York Times also praised the book's organization, noting the "short sections on attractions" that various bookshops have had throughout history. Positive reviews were also published in The Wall Street Journal, Air Mail, and Booklist.
