= Amor Towles =

American novelist (born 1964)

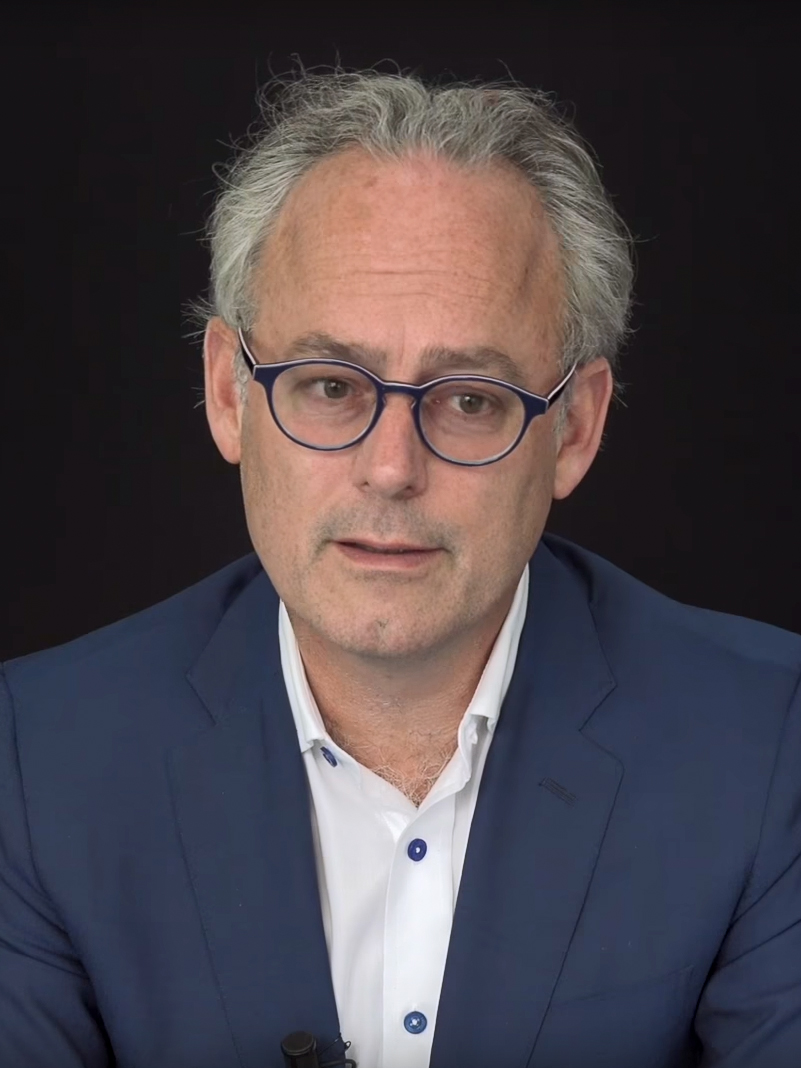
- Towles in 2018
- Born: 1964 (age 61–62); Boston, Massachusetts, U.S.
- Education: Yale University (BA); Stanford University (MA)
- Occupation: Novelist
- Spouse: Maggie
- Children: 2
- Writing career
- Period: 2011–present
- Genre: Literary fiction
- Notable work: A Gentleman in Moscow
- Notable awards: Prix Fitzgerald for Rules of Civility
- Website: www.amortowles.com

Amor Towles (born 1964) is an American author of three novels, a novella, a collection of short stories, and several essays. His writing is often set against a historical backdrop.

Raised in Boston, Towles attended Yale University and initially worked as an investment banker. The success of his debut novel, Rules of Civility (2011), enabled him to write full time. His second novel, A Gentleman in Moscow (2016), also met with commercial and critical success. It was adapted into a 2024 television show and named as a finalist for the Kirkus Prize. In 2021, Towles published The Lincoln Highway. Set during the 1950s, the novel follows four boys on a trek from Nebraska to New York City, as they search for adventure, money, and family. His collection of short fiction, Table for Two (2024), features six stories and a novella.

== Early life and education ==
Towles was born and raised in Boston, to Stokley Porter Towles, an investment banker at Brown Brothers Harriman and a philanthropist, and Holly Hollingsworth. His parents later divorced. He has a brother, Stokley Jr.; a sister, Kimbrough; and two stepbrothers. When Towles was 10 years old, he threw a bottle with a message into the Atlantic Ocean. Several weeks later, he received a letter from Harrison Salisbury, then managing editor of The New York Times, who had found the bottle. Towles and Salisbury corresponded for many years afterward.

Towles graduated from Yale University in 1987 with a Bachelor of Arts in English literature. He then attended Stanford University as a Scowcroft Fellow, receiving a Master of Arts in English in 1989. His M.A. thesis, entitled Temptations of Pleasure, was published in The Paris Review.

== Career ==
After graduating from Yale, Towles was set to teach in China on a two-year fellowship from the Yale China Association. However, this was abruptly canceled due to the Tiananmen Square crackdown in 1989. He moved to New York City in 1989 intending to work a service job while pursuing writing on the side, but he "quickly noticed that all his friends who were waiting tables and pursuing art on the side looked just as tired as the office drones they were serving. So he joined an investment firm instead and took seven years off from writing." From 1991 to 2012, he worked as an investment manager and director of research at Select Equity Group in New York.

When Towles was a young man, he credited Peter Matthiessen, nature writer, novelist, and one of the founders of The Paris Review, as the primary inspiration for writing novels. Towles' first novel, Rules of Civility, was successful beyond his expectations.

His second novel, A Gentleman in Moscow, which was on the New York Times hardcover bestseller list for 59 weeks, was a finalist for the 2016 Kirkus Prize for Fiction. It was also longlisted for the 2018 International Dublin Literary Award. A television adaptation starring Ewan McGregor was released on Paramount+ in March 2024.

Towles' third novel, The Lincoln Highway, was published on October 5, 2021. It was chosen by Amazon as the best book of 2021. As of May 15, 2022, it had been on the New York Times hardcover fiction bestseller list for 30 weeks. In April 2024, Towles released a book of short fiction titled Table for Two.

== Personal life ==
Towles resides in Gramercy Park, Manhattan, New York City, with his wife Maggie, their son Stokley, and their daughter Esmé. Towles is a collector of fine art and antiques.

== Awards and honors ==
- 2016 Finalist for the Kirkus Prize for Fiction
- 2012 Prix Fitzgerald for Rules of Civility

== Works ==
=== Fiction ===
- Rules of Civility: A Novel. New York: Viking. 2011. ISBN 978-0-670-02269-4.
- Eve in Hollywood: A Penguin Special (collection of six interlinked short stories). Penguin. 2013. ISBN 978-1-101-63092-1.
- A Gentleman in Moscow: A Novel. New York: Viking. 2016. ISBN 978-0-670-02619-7.
- You Have Arrived at Your Destination (novella). Forward. Vol. 4. Amazon Original Stories. 2019. ASIN B07VBCYTGR.
- The Lincoln Highway: A Novel. New York: Viking. 2021. ISBN 978-0-7352-2235-9.
- Table for Two. Viking Press. 2024. ISBN 978-0-593-29637-0.

=== Essays ===
- "Channel a More Romantic Era of Transatlantic Travel" (2016)
- “Introduction” in The Best Short Stories 2024: The O. Henry Prize Winners, ed. Amor Towles (Knopf Doubleday Publishing Group, 2024).
