= A Gentleman in Moscow =

2016 novel by Amor Towles

- First edition cover
- Author: Amor Towles
- Audio read by: Nicholas Guy Smith
- Language: English
- Genre: Historical fiction
- Set in: Moscow, post-October Revolution till around a year after the Death of Stalin
- Publisher: Viking
- Publication date: 6 September 2016
- Publication place: United States
- Media type: Print (hardcover and paperback)
- Pages: 462
- ISBN: 978-0-670-02619-7 (hardcover)
- Dewey Decimal: 813/.6
- LC Class: PS3620.O945 G46 2016

A Gentleman in Moscow is a 2016 novel by Amor Towles. It is his second novel, published five years after Rules of Civility (2011).

== Background ==
The protagonist is the fictional Count Alexander Ilyich Rostov, born in Saint Petersburg, Russia, on 24 October 1889. He was raised on his Rostov family's estate, Idlehour, in Nizhny Novgorod. Rostov's godfather was his father's comrade in the cavalry, Grand Duke Demidov. When the Count's parents die of cholera within hours of each other in 1900, Demidov became the 11-year-old's guardian. Demidov counseled him to be strong for his sister, Helena, because "...adversity presents itself in many forms, and if a man does not master his circumstances, then he is bound to be mastered by them." The Rostov siblings grow up into well-adjusted socialites, making numerous visits to nearby estates by horse-drawn troika or sleigh.

As a young man, the Count was sent out of the country by his grandmother for wounding a cad in defense of his sister – events covered through flashbacks. Upon returning home from Paris after the Bolshevik revolution of 1917, the Count is arrested and charged with "social parasitism", beginning the main narrative.

Each of the book's chapters is set according to a doubling then halving chronological structure. The first chapter is the day after the Count's arrest, the second is two days after, and subsequent chapters are set five days, ten days, three weeks, six weeks, three months, six months, one year, two years, four years, eight years, and sixteen years after the beginning of the narrative. At this point, the structure then reverses until the end of the narrative.

== Inspiration ==
Towles's inspiration for the novel was his experience staying at luxury hotels, specifically, a hotel in Geneva, Switzerland, where some guests were permanent residents. He combined the idea of luxury hotels with his knowledge of Russia's long-time historical tradition of house arrest.

== Plot ==
=== The trial ===
The Count is charged as a social parasite before a Bolshevik tribunal, with the expectation of being found guilty and shot. He is unrepentant and eloquently refuses to confess. Because of a revolutionary poem attributed to him, for which some senior Bolsheviks consider him one of the heroes of the struggle against the Tsarist regime, the Count is spared a death sentence. Instead, he is placed under house arrest for life at his current residence, the Hotel Metropol in central Moscow.

=== The hotel ===
A military guard escorts the Count back to the Hotel Metropol, where he is ordered to vacate his luxurious suite and move to the cramped servants' quarters on the sixth floor. As time goes on, the Count cultivates a social circle of friends from his youth as well as selected residents, staff, and customers of the hotel and its restaurants. These include a one-eyed cat, a seamstress, a Russian chef, a French maître d'hotel and former circus juggler, a poet, an actress, an underemployed architect, an orchestra conductor, a prince, a former Red Army colonel, a nine-year-old girl and an aide-de-camp of an American general.

Due to his changed circumstances and restricted freedom, the Count has time for self-reflection. He is a conversationalist, discussing diverse subjects such as evolution, philosophy, Impressionism, Russian writers and poetry, food, post-revolutionary Russian society, and Russia's contributions to the world, and of its purpose both in defense of and against.

An early acquaintance at the hotel is nine-year-old Nina Kulikova, the daughter of a widowed Ukrainian bureaucrat who is fascinated by the now-extinct world of Russian princesses and nobility. She and the Count, who is equally fascinated by her curiosity, form a strong emotional bond.

=== Sofia ===
In 1938, an unexpected arrival changes the Count's circumstances. Nina Kulikova, now a married woman, visits the Count. She confides that her husband Leo was arrested and sentenced to five years of forced labor in the Gulag. Nina decides to follow her husband to Sevvostlag in Kolyma, a remote region of the Soviet Union bounded by the East Siberian Sea and the Arctic Ocean. She begs the Count to accept temporary custody of her young daughter Sofia, while she makes arrangements for the child to join her in Siberia to be near her father. This is the last time the Count sees Nina. So at the age of 49, he becomes Sofia's surrogate father.

Sofia is a quiet, highly intelligent child. Her potential manifests itself through various escapades, including games of hide-and-seek as a young girl and quickly navigating the hotel in order to surprise her foster father.

Later, Sofia takes piano lessons. She surprises the Count by playing a Chopin nocturne (Opus 9, number 2, in E-flat major) after only a few lessons. It is clear to both the piano teacher and the Count that Sofia is a musical prodigy.

=== Observations of life in the Soviet Union ===
The Count's experiences with the various forces of the Revolution, the Soviet state, and of the early revolutionary Soviet era to the beginning of the Cold war. The Count discovers several aspects of the new Russia by the chances given by Nina in seeing the outdoors and of the actions of the Soviet government upon the hotel. The Count's views are particularly affected by the experience of his childhood friend after being asked to censor one of Chekhov's letters, which culminates alongside Sofia's artistry in the climax of the book.

=== Food and drink ===
Many events in the book take place in the hotel's public areas, particularly at the Metropol's main restaurant, the Boyarsky, the hub of the Count's social activity. His interactions with other characters often center around food and beverage choices. Many classic French and world wines are mentioned in the book. Châteauneuf-du-Pape is especially key to the storyline.

== Analysis ==
Towles's approach in A Gentleman in Moscow was described as a "gorgeous sleight of hand" by The New York Times:

What saves the book is the gorgeous sleight of hand that draws it to a satisfying end, and the way he chooses themes that run deeper than mere sociopolitical commentary: parental duty, friendship, romance, the call of home. Human beings, after all, 'deserve not only our consideration but our reconsideration' – even those from the leisured class. Who will save Rostov from the intrusions of the state if not the seamstresses, chefs, bartenders, and doormen? In the end, Towles's greatest narrative effect is not the moments of wonder and synchronicity but the free transformation of these peripheral workers, over decades, into confidants, equals, and, finally, friends. With them around, a life sentence in these gilded halls might make Rostov the luckiest man in Russia.

== Reception ==
Kirkus Reviews found the book to be "a great novel, a nonstop pleasure brimming with charm, personal wisdom, and philosophic insight. This book more than fulfills the promise of Towles' stylish debut, Rules of Civility." NPR opined that "A Gentleman in Moscow is a novel that aims to charm ... and the result is winning, stylish ... Flair is always the goal– Towles never lets anyone merely say goodbye when they could bid adieu, never puts a period where an exclamation point or dramatic ellipsis could stand." Queen Camilla, then Camilla, Duchess of Cornwall, recommended the book to those in isolation during the COVID-19 pandemic.

A Gentleman in Moscow was a finalist for the 2016 Kirkus Prize in Fiction & Literature. It was also an International Dublin Literary Award nominee (2018 longlist).

The audiobook, narrated by Nicholas Guy Smith, was an AudioFile Magazine Earphones Award winner in 2016.

== Adaptation ==
In August 2017, an adaptation of the book in the form of a limited series was announced to be in development. In April 2018, Kenneth Branagh joined the production to star as Count Rostov, with Tom Harper attached to direct. Both of them had left the project by August 2022, when Ewan McGregor replaced Branagh, and Sam Miller took over directorial duties. The series premiered in March 2024, on Paramount+ internationally and Showtime in the US.
