= Ed Speleers =

British actor (born 1988)

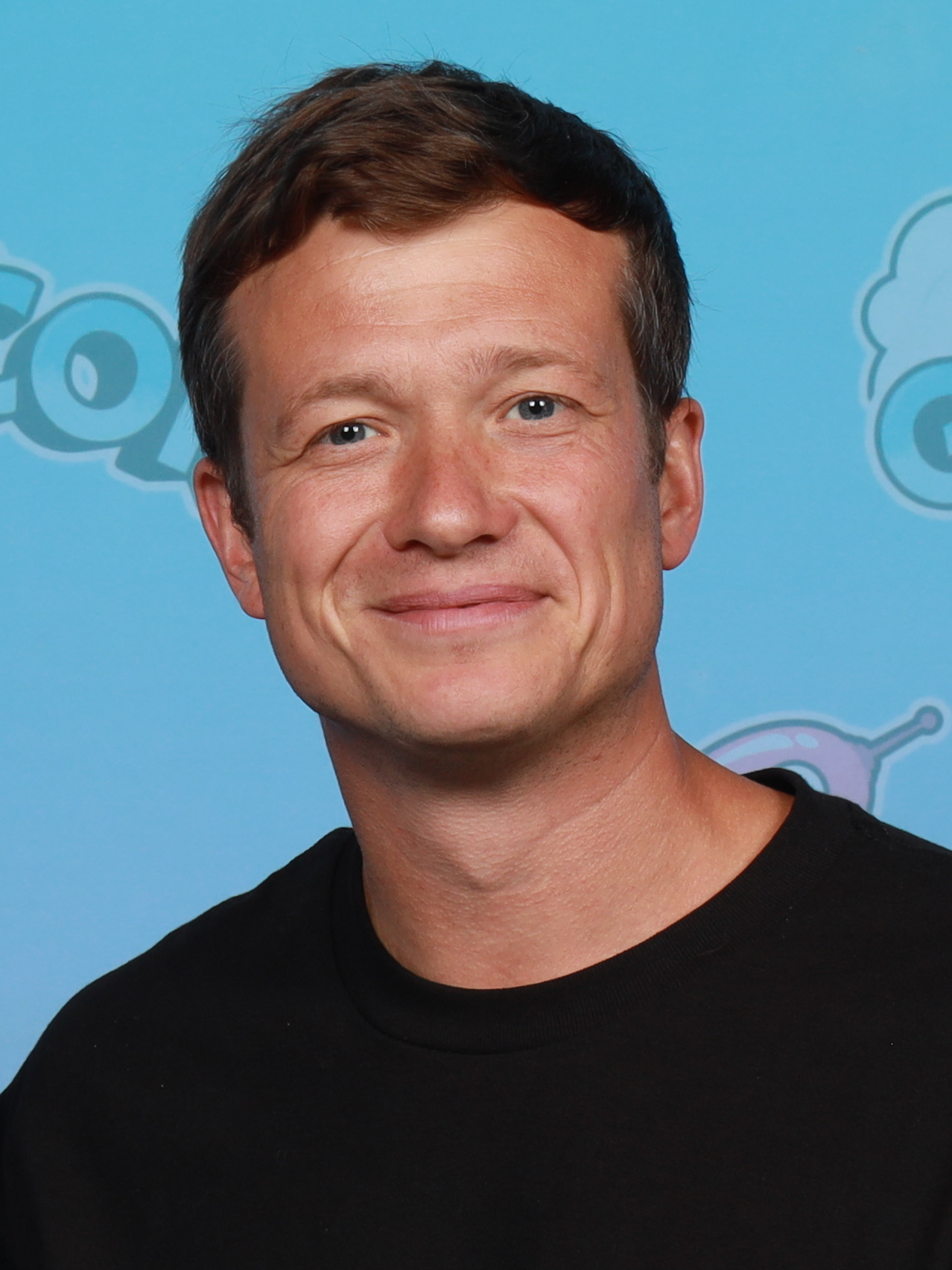
- Speleers at GalaxyCon San Jose in 2024
- Born: Edward John Speleers; 7 April 1988 (age 38); Chichester, West Sussex, England
- Occupation: Actor
- Years active: 2006–present
- Notable work: Eragon, Downton Abbey, Outlander, You, Star Trek: Picard
- Spouse: Asia Macey
- Children: 2

Edward John Speleers (born 7 April 1988) is an English actor. He is best known for playing the title role in the 2006 film Eragon, Jimmy Kent in the TV series Downton Abbey, and antagonist Stephen Bonnet in the TV series Outlander. He has also appeared as Rhys Montrose in the fourth season of You (2023) and Jack Crusher in the third season of Star Trek: Picard (2023).

== Early life ==
Speleers was born at St Richard's Hospital, Chichester, West Sussex, England. He is of Belgian descent. His parents divorced when he was three, with his mother residing in Spain and his father in London. He has two older half brothers. While still in school, Speleers performed in school productions such as A Midsummer Night's Dream and Richard III. In addition to acting, Speleers wrote a play, entitled Retribution, that was performed at Eastbourne College, in Sussex, where he attended. Speleers completed his education in 2006.

== Career ==
=== 2006–2011 ===
Speleers' first professional role in 2006 was the lead in 20th Century Fox's screen version of Christopher Paolini's book Eragon. His next role, in 2008, was Jimmy Penwarden on the British prime time series Echo Beach. He also appeared in the comedy Moving Wallpaper and an episode of Moving Wallpaper: The Mole, which many saw as a parody of Echo Beach.

In 2009 Speleers took on the role of Robin Cecil Byng in the Japanese television miniseries Jiro Shirasu: Man of Honor, which highlighted the intermediary between American and Japanese negotiators at the conclusion of World War II. The next year, Speleers played Jason Grint in the fantasy-adventure television film Witchville, and starred in Aimee Powell's short film Deathless. In 2011, Speleers appeared in Julian Gilbey's action thriller film A Lonely Place to Die and Marion Pilowski's short film The Ride.

=== 2012–2015 ===
In 2012 Speleers starred as Jamie in Andy De Emmony's comedy horror film Love Bite, alongside Jessica Szohr and Timothy Spall. He appeared as the hunter Actaeon in the short promotional film Metamorphosis: Titian 2012 by Credit Suisse for an exhibition in the National Gallery. He was cast in the film A Dead Man in Deptford, based upon Anthony Burgess' novel of the same name, but the film was never completed. That same year, Speleers was cast in the recurring role of Jimmy Kent in the award-winning ITV series Downton Abbey.

The short film Turncoat (2013), from Dark Matter productions, featured Speleers as Nathan Reese. He then starred as Sam in the 2014 thriller Plastic, which was written and directed by Julian Gilbey for Gateway Films. On 12 March 2014, it was reported that Speleers was among five actors being considered for a lead role in Star Wars: The Force Awakens, but was cut during the casting process.

In 2015 Speleers had a small role in the BBC's historical drama mini-series Wolf Hall as Edward Seymour, brother of Henry VIII's third wife Jane Seymour. He also played a leading role in the direct-to-DVD werewolf horror film Howl, as a young train conductor overseeing the final London train. That same year, Speleers guest starred in the BBC One miniseries Partners in Crime, an adaptation of two of Agatha Christie's novels, which focused on crime-solving couple Tommy and Tuppence Beresford. Speleers appeared in three episodes based on the story N or M?, in the role of Carl Denim. Also that year, he portrayed Greg in director Omer Fast's psychological thriller Remainder.

=== 2016–2020 ===
In 2016 he played the role of Slean in ITV's epic fantasy drama television series, Beowulf: Return to the Shieldlands. He had a supporting role in Disney's fantasy adventure sequel Alice Through the Looking Glass from director James Bobin. The following year he appeared in Andy Serkis' directorial debut, the biopic Breathe, which starred Andrew Garfield and Claire Foy. The film is about paraplegic Robin Cavendish, who is recognised as having helped pioneer the development of wheelchairs equipped with mechanical lungs.

In 2017 Speleers was a producer on Barnaby Blackburn's short film Wale. The film, which centers on contemporary racial prejudices in Britain, was nominated for a British Academy Film Award in 2018 in the Short Film category. In late 2017, Speleers was confirmed to appear in seasons four and five of Starz's time-travel drama series Outlander as Irish smuggler and pirate Stephen Bonnet.

In 2018 Speleers starred in the dark comedy-horror film Zoo, which centers on a couple in crisis and attempting to reconcile during a zombie pandemic. He went on to feature in Lars von Trier's psychological thriller The House That Jack Built, which premiered at the Cannes Film Festival. On 20 August 2018, Speleers made his stage premiere in the play Rain Man, portraying the lead role of Charlie Babbitt. The play, based upon the film of the same name, was directed by Jonathan O'Boyle and toured various theatres throughout the United Kingdom.

Romantic comedy For Love or Money featured Speleers as Johnny, opposite Robert Kazinsky and Samantha Barks, in 2019. In the same year, he produced Dad Was, the second short film with director Barnaby Blackburn, which was released in 2020.

In 2020 Speleers made the final appearance in Outlander. He was also the narrator of a David Copperfield audiobook published by Penguin Classics.

=== 2021–present ===
In 2023 Speleers appeared in the fourth season of You as the main antagonist Rhys Montrose. He also appeared as Jack Crusher, a main character and a secret son of the protagonist, in the final season of Star Trek: Picard. His performance earned a Saturn Award nomination as a Best Supporting Actor in a Network or Cable Television Series. This was his third Saturn Award nomination overall.

In 2024 Speleers co-starred in the romantic comedy Irish Wish alongside Lindsay Lohan, and was a guest star in an episode of the British television series The Famous Five. He appeared in Midas Man, a biographical film on Brian Epstein who managed the Beatles. He starred in the 2024 short film Deadline directed by Amy Gardner, followed by the 2025 short film Fudge Sundae directed by Georgia Redman.

In 2026 Speleers appeared as a guest star in the 2nd series of the BBC comedy drama Black Ops. He starred as Thomas Cressman in the ITV drama series The Lady. His next performance will be in Wind of Change as the Scorpions member Matthias Jabs. Also, it is reported that he will appear as a guest in the Netflix action-thriller spin-off series Mercenary: An Extraction Series.

== Personal life ==
Speleers lives in Bristol, England. He is married to Asia Macey, with whom he has two children. He is a supporter of Tottenham Hotspur.

== Filmography ==
=== Film ===
Year	Title	Role	Director	Notes
2006	Eragon	Eragon	Stefen Fangmeier	Film debut
2011	A Lonely Place to Die	Ed	Julian Gilbey	
2012	Love Bite	Jamie	Andy De Emmony	
2014	Plastic	Sam	Julian Gilbey	
2015	Howl	Joe	Paul Hyett	
2015	Remainder	Greg	Omer Fast	
2016	Alice Through the Looking Glass	James Harcourt	James Bobin	
2017	Breathe	Colin Campbell	Andy Serkis	
2018	The House That Jack Built	Ed (Police Officer 2)	Lars von Trier	
2018	Zoo	John	Antonio Tublen	UK title: Death Do Us Part
2019	For Love or Money	Johnny	Mark Murphy	
2022	Against the Ice	Bessel	Peter Flinth	
2024	Irish Wish	James Thomas	Janeen Damian	
2024	Midas Man	Tex Ellington	Joe Stephenson	
2027	Wind of Change	Matthias Jabs	Alex Ranarivelo	

=== Shorts ===
Year	Title	Role	Director	Notes
2010	Deathless	John Ray	Aimee Powell	
2011	The Ride	Student	Marion Pilowsky	
2012	Metamorphosis: Titian 2012	Actaeon	Remi Weekes & Luke White	
2013	Turncoat	Nathan Reece	Will Gilbey	
2017	Wale	—	Barnaby Blackburn	Producer
2020	Dad Was	—	Barnaby Blackburn	Producer
2023	Pylon	—	Barnaby Blackburn	Producer
2024	Deadline	TBA	Amy Gardner	
2025	Fudge Sundae	Jack	Georgia Redman	

=== Television ===
Year	Title	Role	Notes
2008	Moving Wallpaper	Ed Speleers	4 episodes
2008	Moving Wallpaper: The Mole	Ed Speleers	Episode: "#1.6"
2008	Echo Beach	Jimmy Penwarden	12 episodes
2009	Jirō Shirasu: Man of Honour	Robin Cecil Byng	Episode: "Kantorî jentoruman e no michi"
2010	Witchville	Jason Grint	Television film
2012–2014	Downton Abbey	James "Jimmy" Kent	17 episodes
2015	Wolf Hall	Edward Seymour, 1st Duke of Somerset	4 episodes
2015	Agatha Christie's Partners in Crime	Carl Denim	3 episodes
2016	Beowulf: Return to the Shieldlands	Slean	12 episodes
2018–2020	Outlander	Stephen Bonnet	13 episodes
2023	You	Rhys Montrose	10 episodes
2023	Star Trek: Picard	Jack Crusher	10 episodes
2024	Bring the Drama	Himself	Episode: "#1.5"
2024	The Famous Five	Mr. Roland	Episode: "Peril on the Night Train"
2026	Black Ops	Steve	
2026	The Lady	Thomas Cressman	
TBA	Mercenary: An Extraction Series	Alford Griff	
TBA	The Gentlemen	TBA	

=== Theatre ===
Year	Title	Role	Notes
2018	Rain Man	Charlie Babbitt	The Classic Screen to Stage Theatre Company

=== Video games ===
Year	Title	Voice
2006	Eragon	Eragon
2016	Battlefield 1	Daniel Edwards

== Audiobooks ==
- 2020: David Copperfield by Charles Dickens (Penguin Classics)

== Awards and nominations ==
Year	Award	Category	Nominated work	Result	Ref.
2007	Saturn Awards	Best Performance by a Younger Actor	Eragon	Nominated	
2014	Screen Actors Guild Awards	Outstanding Performance by an Ensemble in a Drama Series	Downton Abbey	Nominated	
2015	Screen Actors Guild Awards	Outstanding Performance by an Ensemble in a Drama Series	Downton Abbey	Won	
2016	Screen Actors Guild Awards	Outstanding Performance by an Ensemble in a Drama Series	Downton Abbey	Won	
2019	BAFTA Film Awards	Best British Short Film	Wale	Nominated	
2019	Saturn Awards	Best Guest-Starring Performance in a Television Series	Outlander	Nominated	
2023	National Film Awards UK	Best Supporting Actor in a TV Series	You	Nominated	
2024	Saturn Awards	Best Supporting Actor in a Network or Cable Television Series	Star Trek: Picard	Nominated	
