= ActionFest =

Film festival

- Status: Active
- Genre: Film festival
- Location: Asheville, North Carolina
- Country: United States
- Organizer: Carolina Cinemas and Aaron Norris and Bill Banowsky

ActionFest was an annual film festival held in Asheville, NC, started by Carolina Cinemas and Magnolia Pictures founder Bill Banowsky action director and producer Aaron Norris (Missing in Action III, Walker, Texas Ranger), Dennis Berman and Tom Quinn. ActionFest was the first film festival in the world devoted exclusively to action film. It was also the only film festival in the world that honoring stunt performers, filling a void caused by the decision of the Academy of Motion Picture Arts and Sciences not to recognize stunt men and stunt women in its Academy Awards. ActionFest's stated mission was to "recognize, honor and appreciate the remarkable efforts of these amazing people who risk their lives every day to make Hollywood films look exciting and great."

== ActionFest 2010 ==
The first annual festival took place at The Carolina Asheville cinema April 15–18, 2010, opening with the world premiere of director Neil Marshall's bloody sword and sandal epic, Centurion. The 2010 festival featured over 25 films from around the world, including the world premiere of Undisputed III: Redemption. Legendary martial artist and action movie superstar Chuck Norris was on hand to receive ActionFest's Action Star of the Decade Award, but he actually presented the award to his long-time creative partner, his brother Aaron.

In addition to screening action movies, ActionFest also showcased movie stuntmen, stunt coordinators and other technical experts, who gave two live stunt performances with improvised fights, three to four story falls, rappelling, sky-diving and a flying jetpack demonstration.

=== ActionFest 2010 Awards ===
In its inaugural event, ActionFest began the tradition of giving out awards for achievement in areas of action cinema such as stunt work, 2nd unit directing, and stars on the screen. The ActionFest Awards included:
Lifetime Achievement Award: Paul Weston: Motion Picture Stunt Coordinator / 2nd Unit Director (multiple Bond films, Robin Hood, Aliens, Superman 1-3)
Lifetime Achievement Award: Kinnie Gibson – Stuntman (Walker, Texas Ranger, Robocop 2, Delta Force 2, Jet Pack Operator
Action Star of the Decade Award: Chuck Norris
Stunt Coordinator/2nd Unit Director of the Decade: Jeff Habberstad (The Last Airbender, Spiderman)
Rising Action Star: Marko Zaror (Mandrill, Undisputed III: Redemption)

=== ActionFest 2010 Jury Awards ===
There were also awards given to films at the festival, chosen by a jury. The winners of the ActionFest 2010 Jury Awards were:
Best Fight Scene: 14 Blades - Teahouse battle between Green Dragon (Donnie Yen) and the Judge of the Sky Eagles (Chen Wu)
Best Fight Choreographer: - Larnell Stovall (Undisputed 3)
Best Director: - Isaac Florentine (Undisputed 3)
Best Film: - Merantau (Directed by Gareth Evans)

=== The ActionFest 2010 Jury Panel ===
Drew McWeeny (Hitfix.com)
Devin Faraci (chud.com)
Colin Geddes (Toronto Midnight Madness)
Todd Brown (Twitchfilm.net)
Jury President: Chuck Norris

== ActionFest 2011 ==
ActionFest returned to the Carolina Cinemas Asheville for its second year on April 7–10, 2011 and to shine a light on action films and the stuntmen and women who perform in them.

=== ActionFest 2011 Awards ===
The ActionFest Award winners for 2011 were:
Lifetime Achievement Award: - Buddy Joe Hooker (First Blood, Deathproof, The Wraith, Hooper, and many others)
Stunt Coordinator of the Year Award" - Russell Towery (Machete)
Man of Action Award: - Michael Jai White (Never Back Down 2, The Dark Knight, Black Dynamite)
Action Film Of The Year Award: - Machete (Directed by Robert Rodriguez and Ethan Maniquis)
Producer of the Year Award: - Somsak Techaratanapresert (Sahamongkol Film International) (Chocolate, Ong-Bak: Muay Thai Warrior)
ActionFest Recognition Award: - Stunts Unlimited, for 40 Years in the Action Business

=== ActionFest 2011 Jury Awards ===
The 2011 Jury Award winners for ActionFest 2011 were:
30 Seconds of Action: Evan Pease's Action Figures
Best Action Sequence: The nocturnal garbage truck/dune buggy chase in Tomorrow, When the War Began
Best Stuntwork: Bangkok Knockout's stunt team
Best Director: Julian Gilbey for A Lonely Place to Die
Best Film: A Lonely Place to Die

==== The ActionFest 2011 Jury Panel ====
The Jury in 2011 consisted of:
Katrina Hill (actionflickchick.com)
Tim League (Founder and CEO, Alamo Drafthouse Cinema)
Russell Towery (Stuntman, Stunt Coordinator, 2nd Unit Director)
Scott Weinberg (Writer: Twitch, FEARnet, Movies.com, and more)
Freakin' Jay Deacon (Program Director, 105.9 The Mountain)

== ActionFest 2012 ==
The third annual ActionFest was held on April 12–15, 2012, and honored legendary stunt man Mickey Gilbert with the third annual Lifetime Action Achievement Award.

The inaugural Chick Norris (Best Female Action Star) Award was given to MMA and Action Film Star Gina Carano. Carano received the award in person at ActionFest 2012. The Chick Norris award will be given to "a woman working in film today who best represents the spirit, attitude, athleticism and grit of Hollywood legend Chuck Norris."

Festival Director Colin Geddes returned this year to program the festival. The festival saw the regional premieres of Solomon Kane on opening night, and Dragon on closing night.

=== ActionFest 2012 Awards ===
The ActionFest Award winners for 2012 were:
Lifetime Achievement Award: - Mickey Gilbert (Butch Cassidy and the Sundance Kid, The Wild Bunch, The Last of the Mohicans
Fight Choreographer of the Year Award: - JJ Perry (Mortal Kombat, Haywire, Get the Gringo, Django Unchained)
Man Of Action Award: - Jack Gill (Knight Rider, Dukes of Hazzard, Fast Five)
Producer of the Year Award: - Courtney Solomon (After Dark Action, Dragon Eyes, Transit)
Chick Norris Award: - Gina Carano (Haywire)
Rising Action Star Award: - Cung Le (Bodyguards and Assassins, True Legend, Dragon Eyes)
Best Car Stunt Of The Decade Award: - Tom Elliott (President, Stunts Unlimited, Criminal Minds)
Best Young Stuntman Of The Year Award: - Trevor Habberstad (The Amazing Spider-Man, The Dark Knight Rises, After Earth)

=== ActionFest 2012 Jury Awards ===
30 Seconds Of Action - Tim McGaren (Operation C)
Best Action Sequence - The Lost Bladesman
Best Director - Felix Chong & Alex Mak, The Lost Bladesman
Best Picture - I Declare War
Best Screenplay - I Declare War
Best Villain - James Frain, Transit
Spirit Of ActionFest - Manborg
Best Fight - Opening Fight Scene in Dragon Eyes

==== The ActionFest 2012 Jury Panel ====
Mitch Davis - Fantasia Film Festival
Dan Guando - The Weinstein Company
Borys Kit - The Hollywood Reporter
Marc McCloud - Orbit DVD
Eric Vespe - Ain't It Cool News
Sadie - The Mountain
