= Summit Fever =

2022 film by Julian Gilbey

- Directed by: Julian Gilbey
- Written by: Julian Gilbey
- Produced by: Andrew Loveday; Tiernan Hanby; Marc Goldberg
- Starring: Freddie Thorp; Ryan Phillippe; Michel Biel; Mathilde Warnier; Theo Christine
- Cinematography: Adam Hall
- Edited by: Gabriel Foster Prior; Will Gilbey
- Music by: Michael Richard Plowman
- Production companies: Haymarket Films; Metrol Technology; Head Gear Films
- Distributed by: Saban Films
- Release date: October 14, 2022 (United States)
- Running time: 115 minutes
- Country: United Kingdom
- Language: English
- Box office: $648,353

Summit Fever is a 2022 British thriller film written and directed by Julian Gilbey and starring Ryan Phillippe.

== Cast ==
- Freddie Thorp as Michael
- Michel Biel as Jean-Pierre
- Laura Ferries as Lucy
- Mathilde Warnier as Isabelle
- Theo Christine as Rudi
- Ryan Phillippe as Leo
- Hannah New as Natascha
- Jocelyn Wedow as Béa
- Jacopo Carta as Angelo
- Gianmarco Saurino as Tino
- Thomas Ancora as Damien Roux
- Jake Meniani as Claude
- Régis Romele as Mr Beaudin
- Nancy Tate as Mrs Beaudin
- Rupert Procter as Michael's Dad
- Nick Nevern as David

== Production ==
Production on the film began in January 2018. The film was shot in Chamonix.

== Release ==
The film was released in theaters and on demand and digital platforms on October 14, 2022.

== Reception ==
On the review aggregator website Rotten Tomatoes, 38% of 13 critics' reviews are positive, with an average rating of 6.0/10.
