= Mathilde Warnier =

French actress, model and journalist

- Born: 22 October 1991 (age 34); Rosny-sous-Bois, France
- Occupations: Actress, model, columnist
- Years active: 2011 - present
- Known for: Au Field de la nuit Summit Fever; The Serpent

Mathilde Warnier (born 22 October 1991) is a French actress, model, and columnist.

In 2011, she became known for an exchange with Nicolas Bedos on the set of the show Au Field de la nuit.

In 2021, she portrayed Nadine Gires in The Serpent, a British TV drama which tells the story of the serial killer Charles Sobhraj.

== Biography ==
On 21 October 2011, Warnier became a student in audiovisual BTS and took part in the series Au Field de la nuit, during a performance of which she took to the floor to offer up a comment on the book that Nicolas Bedos was promoting.,

In 2013, Warnier became one of the muses of Cacharel for the women's perfume 'Anaïs Anaïs'. She was on the cover of the magazine Paulette in 2014, and in September 2015, she posed for the lingerie brand Miss Crofton. She made several commercials for Évian and Carte Noire, and appeared in two short films and a public health spot for AIDS, before joining the cast of the television series Au service de la France (screened in English as A Very Secret Service).

On 5 September 2016, Warnier became a reporter for the Le Petit Journal presented by Cyrille Eldin on Canal +, but left three weeks later. At the same time, she announced that she had given up television.

== Career ==
In 2014, Warnier made her acting debut in the film À toute épreuve.

In 2019, she played Louise Chartrain, a French doctor, in the series The Widow.

In 2021, she played the role of Nadine Gires in the series The Serpent.

In 2022, she played Isabelle, a French ski guide, in the movie Summit Fever with co-star Freddie Thorp. It was filmed at an altitude of more than 3000 metres.

== Filmography ==
=== Film ===
| Year | Title | Role | Notes |
|---|---|---|---|
| 2014 | The Grad Job | Maeva | |
| 2015 | Caprice | Virginie | |
| 2016 | Eternity | Solange | |
| 2017 | The Wild Boys | Sloane | |
| 2019 | Curiosa | Louise de Heredia | |
| 2022 | Summit Fever | Isabelle | |
| 2025 | Wildcat | Cia | |

=== Television ===
| Year | Title | Role | Notes |
|---|---|---|---|
| 2015 - 2018 | A Very Secret Service | Sophie Mercaillon | |
| 2019 | The Widow | Louise Chartrain | |
| 2019 | Spiral | Soizic | |
| 2019 | Dynasty | Juliette Carrington | |
| 2019 | World on Fire | Giulia | |
| 2021 | The Serpent | Nadine Gires | |
| 2024 | The New Look | Marie-Thérėse | |
| 2025 | This Is Not a Murder Mystery | Georgette Magritte | |
