= Sinchronicity =

- Written by: Julian Jones; Lucy Watkins
- Directed by: Brian Grant; Philip John
- Starring: Paul Chequer; Navin Chowdhry; Daniel Percival; Mark Smith; Jemima Rooper; John Sheahan; Camille Coduri
- Country of origin: United Kingdom
- No. of series: 1
- No. of episodes: 6

Production
- Running time: 48 minutes

Original release
- Network: BBC Three
- Release: 16 July – 20 August 2006

Sinchronicity is a six-part comedy-drama series broadcast on BBC Three in the United Kingdom in mid-2006. Set in Manchester, the programme is narrated by Nathan (Paul Chequer) and focuses on the love triangle of him, Fi (Jemima Rooper), and Jase (Daniel Percival).

The programme is executive produced by Julian Murphy, who was an executive producer on Channel 4's As If and Sugar Rush and Sky One's Hex. Stylistically similar to As If, following a non-linear narrative, it also features ex-cast members Chequer, Rooper and Mark Smith and, as such, can be seen as its spiritual successor.

Sinchronicity was part of BBC Three's aim to divert from programming with a parenting theme, and aimed at viewers in their mid-20s to mid-30s "for whom parenthood is the farthest thing from their minds". The theme tune is "Boys Will Be Boys" by the Ordinary Boys. The show was filmed in high definition and was re-run on BBC HD in October 2006.

== Cast ==
- Nathan (Paul Chequer)

The show's central character; Nathan is a journalist, who works for an erotic magazine, run by Peggy. He is the best friend of Jase, and is secretly in love with Jase's girlfriend, Fi.

- Fi (Jemima Rooper)

Fi is a chef who meets Jase through a chance encounter (she is doing her make-up in the mirror of a van Jase and Nathan have rented, and Jase reverses the van, hitting Fi in the face with the mirror). Whilst she is committed to Jase, she is secretly harbouring feelings for his best friend, Nathan.

- Jase Tindall (Daniel Percival)

Jase, a corporate account manager, is unaware of Nathan and Fi's secret feelings for each other, but also harbours secrets of his own - he is trying to come to terms with his bisexuality.

- Mani Chandra (Navin Chowdhry)

Mani is a doctor. Mani meets Jase through a chance sexual encounter and begins to have feelings for him.

- Baas (Mark Smith)

Baas is Shazney's boyfriend and also a club bouncer.

- Peggy Simmons (Camille Coduri)

The porn-baron editor who runs the magazine Nathan works for, Peggy is tough and confident with her sexuality.

- Fay (John Sheahan)

A transgender woman awaiting male-to-female sex reassignment therapy. Fay is also employed by Peggy, and becomes friends with her co-worker, Nathan.

- Rosa (Danielle Urbas)

A deeply religious Catholic who meets Nathan in a chance encounter.

== Episodes ==
No.	Title	Directed by	Written by	Original release date
1	"Love Triangle"	Brian Grant	Julian Jones	16 July 2006
Nathan is on the run from the jealous boyfriend - a bouncer - of a woman who has two vaginas, after being sent on a mission by his boss, Peggy, to investigate and persuade her into taking part in a feature for the erotic magazine he writes for. The trio - Nathan, his best friend Jase, and Jase's girlfriend, Fi - are pursued through the streets by the bouncer; Jase disappears, leaving Fi and Nathan alone together. They end up at a party, where they are reunited with Jase temporarily. After Nathan is caught, and attacked, by the bouncer, Fi turns up at Nathan's apartment after she loses her keys, and they have a passionate sexual encounter. A drunken, distraught Jase knocks on Nathan's door, leaving Fi to hide herself and any evidence of her infidelity. The following day, Jase asks Nathan to meet him, where he confides in his best friend, the events of the night before. Jase met a doctor called Mani, who Jase invites to the party, and who proceeds to give him illegal drugs and a blowjob in the toilets at the party. Nathan, who was worried Jase had caught on, or been told about, his night of passion with Fi, narrates his feelings to the audience, whilst Jase tries to convince Nathan that he's not gay. Nathan proceeds to recount the events of how they met Fi, and how he persuaded Jase to pursue her and ask her out. Nathan goes to see Fi, at the restaurant where she is working, where he tries to pursue her further.
2	"Distances"	Brian Grant	Julian Jones	23 July 2006
Nathan attempts to take Fi out for a romantic dinner, but she declines claiming that she is not interested in cheating on Jase, and dismissing their one night together as a "drunken shag." Jase once again meets with Mani who is called back to his work at a hospital. Jase follows him to the hospital where he meets Rosa, a devout Catholic, who has just broken up with her controlling boyfriend. Fi, who is waiting for Jase to pick her up, rings Nathan to find out where Jase is. Nathan lies for Jase, telling her that there was a robbery at Jase's office which Jase has gone to sort out. Nathan goes to the restaurant to bring Fi home and on the way Fi tells him to move on with his life. Nathan goes on a date with Rosa, whom he met in church, while escaping the police who saw him distributing prostitute cards (he printed and supplied them to the local sex-workers in order to make some money on the side), and while she was praying for a new boyfriend, having seen a gay couple (Jase and Mani) at the hospital looking so in love. He confides in Rosa that one of his sexual fantasies involves a woman calling to his apartment wearing only lingerie and a coat. Fi becomes increasingly suspicious about Jase's activities the night before, as she finds his cover story unconvincing. Nathan, after receiving increasing lewd phone calls learns that the cards he has been distributing have been tampered with by Peggy and Fay to include his phone number. He gets Jase to help him take down the cards from various phone booths across Manchester. Jase goes to the hospital to end his relationship with Mani, but has a change of heart and rings Fi to cancel their dinner claiming that he is stuck at the office. Fi goes to Nathan's flat to confront Nathan about Jase's activities after she finds one of Nathan's prostitute cards in Jase's coat. Nathan attempts to explain that the cards are his and that nothing is going on, when they are interrupted by Rosa who is acting out Nathan's fantasy. Jase then comes in and Rosa recognises him from the hospital. Two police call claiming that the flat is being used for prostitution and find Rosa dressed only in lingerie. Two prostitutes follow a moment later, irate that they have not received any customers due to the edited phone numbers. Nathan is brought to the police station but is let off with a warning. Rosa decides to end her relationship with Nathan because of the debacle at his flat.
3	"Tangled Loves"	Philip John	Julian Jones	30 July 2006
Nathan is confronted by an angry Rosa, who tells him she is infected with a sexually transmitted infection, and that he infected her. He works out that if he infected her, then he would almost certainly have infected Fi, who would have infected Jase, who would have infected Mani, which would reveal the secret that he had shagged his best mate's girlfriend. He is told by the nurse at the STI that it is his duty to inform all those who he thinks would be affected. Added to this, Peggy is sniping at Nathan's heels with regards to a feature she wants him to cover on swinging. She has booked him to attend, and take part, in a swinger's party; no spectating allowed. Convinced that he has to tell Fi, after confiding in his transsexual colleague, Fay, Nathan proceeds to find out if she's infected. He sees her taking some pills - evening primrose - and decides he has nothing to worry about. He doesn't realise Fi has been to the STI clinic too, angry that she has been infected with Gonorrhoea by Nathan. Meanwhile, Mani and Jase are arranging another get together, at Mani's expensive London flat, where they proceed to have sex. A phone-call from Fi takes Jase back into the real world, but an understanding Mani provides comfort. That evening, the trio go round to Fi and Jase's for dinner, where Fi is suitably hostile with Nathan, insulting him with words such as "tossprick" over a game of Scrabble. The next day, Jase receives an urgent call from Mani, and they meet at the hospital, where Mani informs Jase that he gave him "the clap," and asks who gave it to him. Jase confesses that he ignored the symptoms, and is certain that it wasn't Fi who infected him, leading him to confess that he has had one-night encounters with men, and that a man whom he met a few times at the gym, told him earlier that he had the infection, and that it was likely Jase would too. Mani presses for more information from Jase, and Jase confesses that he had his first homosexual encounter when he was 18, and that "it's just something that happens sometimes." That night, Jase asks Nathan to meet him, and confesses to Nathan that he has infected Mani, and that there was someone else who he had sex with, leaving Nathan relieved that Jase has not worked out that he had sex with Fi. Jase is convinced that he will end it with Mani, and live a happy life with Fi, and is persuaded by Nathan, that he won't have given Fi the infection. The following evening, Mani and Jase meet again, and Mani confesses that before he met Jase, he "shagged around," with Jase ending the relationship, by saying he loves Fi. Nathan attends the swingers party, and shies away from having sex with anyone. The following day, Fi meets Mani at the STI clinic, where he talks to her about Jase, leading her to surmise, he'd have been a "shit boyfriend" anyway. Later that day, Jase tells Nathan he's going with Fi for a few days away, and that they will be just fine.
4	"Miracle Pills"	Philip John	Julian Jones	6 August 2006
The episode opens with Nathan attending a funeral, before flashing back to Nathan with Peggy and Fay at the magazine office. Peggy has arranged for Nathan to meet a porn star that night, and Fay has given him some recreational pills for erectile dysfunction, that claim to provide a 36-hour erection. Nathan's dad turns up, and asks to tag-along, where he flirts recklessly with the Dutch pornstar, who has starred in films such as "Position Impossible," "The Extra Testicle" and "The Talented Mr Lick-Me." Nathan leaves early, and on return to his flat, hears the pornstar crying out; he opens the door to find his father, dead, and attached to the pornstar, in a sexual position. The ambulance attendees inform Nathan that his father has no vital signs, except for his erection, and that the shock has caused the pornstar's vaginal muscles to spasm. Mani informs Nathan that the 36-hour erection pills were found in his pocket, and that his father has died. Going back a few days, Nathan goes round to Fi and Jase's apartment, to wait for Jase, nervous about giving Fi the STD, but commenting that he knows it was his good friend, "JA-C-DC" (a pun on the AC/DC nickname for bisexuals), who infected her. Jase and Nathan proceed to the gym to play squash, where things get a bit heated on the court; they quickly reconnect though, and Jase confides to Nathan in the changing room that he is suffering from problems getting an erection with Fi. Nathan tells him he only wants the best for them, and gives Jase the pills. He uses them that night, and he has sex with Fi, only for her to discover him in the bathroom with a raging erection, and the pills in his hand. Scenes from Nathan's father's funeral are interspersed with Fay and Nathan hiding the true nature of his father's death from his mother, before she eventually reveals to Nathan that the hospital informed her. Jase and Fi are both in attendance at the funeral, although things are strained between Jase and Nathan, as Jase does not forgive him for giving him the pills that turned him into a "dalek." Mani meets Nathan to discuss his father's death, where Mani reveals that Jase has been in contact, and has informed him that it's all over between him and Fi, following her anger that he used the pills. Flashing forward to the funeral, Mani turns up, and has to pretend that he's never met Jase or Fi beforehand; when Jase and Mani are alone outside of the wake, Mani ends things with him, with Jase conflicted between him and Fi. Back in the present day, after the wake, Fi turns up at Nathan's apartment, and tells him she wants him. As they are kissing, Nathan's mobile rings; it is Mani informing him that Jase has had an accident - he has been hit by a car. At the hospital, Fi is distressed, and Nathan finally disposes of the erection pills in the hospital bin.
5	"For a Few More Lies"	Brian Grant	Lucy Watkins	13 August 2006
Jase is in a coma at the hospital, having been at a gay club, upset about Mani ending their relationship; at the club, he had a random sexual affair, took a multitude of drugs, and got drunk, prior to leaving and getting hit by the car. Nathan takes it upon himself to convince the nurses, and Mani, who, despite not being Jase's doctor, has taken an obvious interest, that Fi cannot find out about where Jase was and what he was up to, that night. It's not clear if Jase will pull through; his brainscans suggest he could be seriously damaged by the car accident, and could possibly die. Mani suggests that Nathan get Jase's personal belongings, and hide them from Fi, including a cock ring, and his mobile phone. When the mobile phone rings, and Nathan answers, he receives a nasty shock from a drug dealer Jase has dealt with, and to whom he owes £200. Nathan arranges a way to get Fi out of the hospital for a while, saying he will watch over Jase, whilst she goes home and has a bath and a rest. Whilst she is away, he visits Derek, the drug dealer, and his obese girlfriend, who is obsessed with fried chicken; Nathan pays him the money, but accidentally chokes the dealer's pet dog on a chicken bone. He hides the dog in the washing machine, only to lean back and turn it on to see the dead dog spinning around; he makes his exit unscathed, and without the dealer being aware of where the dog has ended up. Nathan rushes back to the hospital to be greeted by Jemima, a drag queen, who Jase had met at the club last night, and to whom he had confessed his love for Mani. The nurse, who has been playing along with Nathan, after she caught him stealing Jase's cock ring, overhears the conversation, and becomes convinced that Nathan is gay too. The doctors reveal that Jase will be fine, and that it was the high amount of drugs he had consumed that had led to the frightening brainscans. The nurse tells Fi that Nathan has told her he is gay, which leads to Nathan trying to escape Fi's wrath by telling her that he fancied the nurse and thought she would try to "convert" him to heterosexuality, thereby tarnishing his relationship with Fi, upsetting her immensely. Jase awakes from his coma, to the relief of Fi, Nathan and Mani, and whilst the doctors run tests, Mani tells Nathan he has discovered who he was really trying to protect - he wasn't trying to protect Jase, as Mani had assumed, but Fi. Mani tells Nathan to confess the truth to Fi; that he loves her and that Jase is gay, for it will be the only way to win her round. She is waiting outside the hospital for a bus back to the flat, and Nathan runs to catch it, nearly colliding with a car being driven by Derek, whose dog he killed, but does he make it?
6	"Realities"	Brian Grant	Julian Jones	20 August 2006
As Nathan rushes to catch the bus, and tell Fi about Jase's sexual orientation, and the truth about his feelings for her, there are two versions of events; one where he caught the bus, and one where he missed it, interspersed with one another. In the first version, he gets on the bus, and asks Fi to go for a coffee with him, where he confesses the truth about Jase being gay, and tells Fi that he loves her and can't be without her. Nathan goes to the hospital, having told Mani that he's informed Fi, where an alert Jase gives him his credit card and PIN, and asks him to go out and buy an engagement ring for Fi, as the whole experience has made him realise he wants to spend his life with her. Fi walks in, and speaks to Nathan privately, before asking Jase to be honest and tell the truth; she confesses to him that she had an affair with Nathan, and asks him to be honest too. Meanwhile, Fay is having a party to celebrate her imminent gender reassignment surgery (a "Goodbye penis, hello vagina!" party); she is having second thoughts, and Nathan turns up and re-assures her everything will be fine. Nathan, now home at his flat, is surprised to see Jase in his hospital gown, angry that he told Fi about the affair; he leaves to find Fi, and confesses to her that he doesn't know if he's gay. Nathan goes round to find her, only to find Jase with a beer, who announces that Fi has left for London, and she's not returning; she only hopes that Jase and Nathan can go back to being best friends. Nathan leaves and runs into a lady carrying an empty pet cage; she announces that she has just had her rabbit euthanised, and he hails her a taxi. Jase goes to find Mani, who tells him that he can't be with him; it's over for good. Nathan ends up at the train station, trying to find Fi; a passing train blocks his view of her, and he goes back, depressed, and ends up at the bar, where he runs into the woman with two vaginas, who, he tells her, started this mess. However, in the other set of events, Nathan misses the bus - he trips over some paint cans that are outside on the pavement, ending up covered in pink and white paint and being attacked by Derek, the drug dealer. A woman holding a pet cage containing a rabbit waits for him outside the police station, where he has been let off after she told them he was innocent. He goes for a coffee with her, where she confesses that the bunny belongs to her daughter and it has cancer, so she has taken it to be euthanised; she has lied to her daughter by buying an identical replacement, as, coming out of a divorce, she does not want to cause her daughter any further trauma. Nathan offers to have the rabbit, but the woman insists that they take it to the vet; she cannot go through with it, so Nathan offers to, deciding not to go in, but to take the rabbit with him. Meanwhile, Fi arrives at the hospital to visit Jase, and he proposes to her; she tells him she wants a bit spontaneous proposal, on bent knee or something outrageous, like a nude proposal. Nathan arrives late to Fay's party with the rabbit in tow, and chats with Fay about his life, calming her nerves about the imminent surgery. Nathan calls Fi and they arrange to meet at the bar later. She visits Jase in hospital, tells him she has to say no to the proposal, and confesses she's been seeing Nathan. Mani comforts Jase and tells him he will be there for him, clearly in love with him. Fi meets Nathan at the bar and they confess their love for one another and kiss; they reminisce that it was there that this all started, and they walk past the woman with two vaginas on their way out.

== Domestic and international distribution ==
The show was released on DVD in the United Kingdom on 12 February 2007.

The series was broadcast in Australia on SBS from 10 March 2008. It was sold to TVNZ in New Zealand and began screening on 31 October 2008 at 11pm. It was shown in France on Virgin 17 on 11 February 2009, with episodes shown weekly at 10:20pm. It was first shown in Sweden on SVT on 22 October 2010.
