= Bollywood Queen =

2002 film by Jeremy Wooding

- Directed by: Jeremy Wooding
- Written by: Neil Spencer; Jeremy Wooding
- Based on: Romeo and Juliet by William Shakespeare
- Produced by: Jeremy Wooding
- Starring: Preeya Kalidas; James McAvoy; Ray Panthaki; Ciarán McMenamin; Amerjit Deu; Saraj Chaudhry; Ronny Jhutti
- Cinematography: Jono Smith
- Edited by: Ben Yeates
- Music by: Steve Beresford; additional music and theme song: Michael Kay
- Production company: Win Media
- Distributed by: Redbus Film Distribution
- Release dates: 11 December 2002 (premiere); 17 October 2003
- Running time: 89 minutes
- Country: United Kingdom
- Languages: English; Hindi

Bollywood Queen is a British Indian take on the William Shakespeare play Romeo and Juliet, directed by Jeremy Wooding and starring Preeya Kalidas and James McAvoy. Produced by Jeremy Wooding, the film was released in 2003.

== Plot ==
Geena is a Bollywood fanatic from a respectable Gujarati family. She has finished school, and is at university doing a business studies course. She is dating Dilip, an ambitious computer whizz, but wants her love life to be like it is in the movies. However, Dilip only wants sex. Geena's family owns Ganesh Global, a clothing company which imports materials and saris from India. Geena has a part-time job working in the shop. She is also in a secret band with two other girls, Anjali and Neeta.

Jay is a young guy from Somerset who joins his brother Dean in London, who also works in the clothing industry, for someone called Frank Ian McShane. He owns a guitar, of which he is extremely protective.

One day, when Geena is walking along the road, Jay and his brother happen to be managing some poles. One of the poles nearly falls on Geena, but Jay lunges at her and pushes her out of the way before it can crush her. Geena, disgusted at this, hurries along, leaving her phone behind. Jay sees the phone and takes it, but his brother Dean repossesses it. Jay then takes the phone back and gives it to Geena, who then thanks him for saving her life. She then gives him her phone number, and they begin to meet up regularly.

The two start to fall in love, meeting up in secret regularly and hiding from Geena's family. However, Dean discovers the affair and launches an attack on Ganesh Global. One of Geena's brothers also sees the two together, and Geena gets into trouble with her family. Her brother then takes away her phone. Geena's brothers then beat Jay up, leaving him bleeding. Jay and Geena then run away together and escape their family. Dean is in hospital, and Jay visits him and takes away all his money.

Eventually, Jay and Geena return to London and Jay settles his dispute with his father and brother. Geena then turns up for her relative's wedding, dressed in Indian attire, and sings with her band. She then attempts to reunite with her family, and it is revealed her brother, Sanjay is a criminal, and is handling illegal suits, and that her brother, Tariq is gay. Jay and Geena then leave in the bride and groom's carriage, and her mother says to her father, "She'll be back."

== Cast ==
- Preeya Kalidas as Geena
- James McAvoy as Jay
- Ray Panthaki as Anil
- Ciarán McMenamin as Dean
- Kat Bhathena as Anjali
- Ian McShane as Frank
- Amerjit Deu as Sanjay
- Karen David as Neeta
- Lalita Ahmed as Geena's mother
- Andy Beckwith as Johnny
- Jo Cameron Brown as Anita
- Saraj Chaudhry as Tariq
- Giada Dobrzenska as Club Kid
- Ronny Jhutti as Dilip
- Tajpal Rathore as Family member
- Ranu Setna as Uncle Ganesh
- Faizaan Shurai as Factory Worker
- Elsa de Belilovsky as Elsa

== Awards and nominations ==
British Independent Film Awards

- Jeremy Wooding – nominated for Douglas Hickox Award (Best Debut Director)
