= Mark Smith (actor, born 1969) =

British actor and bodybuilder

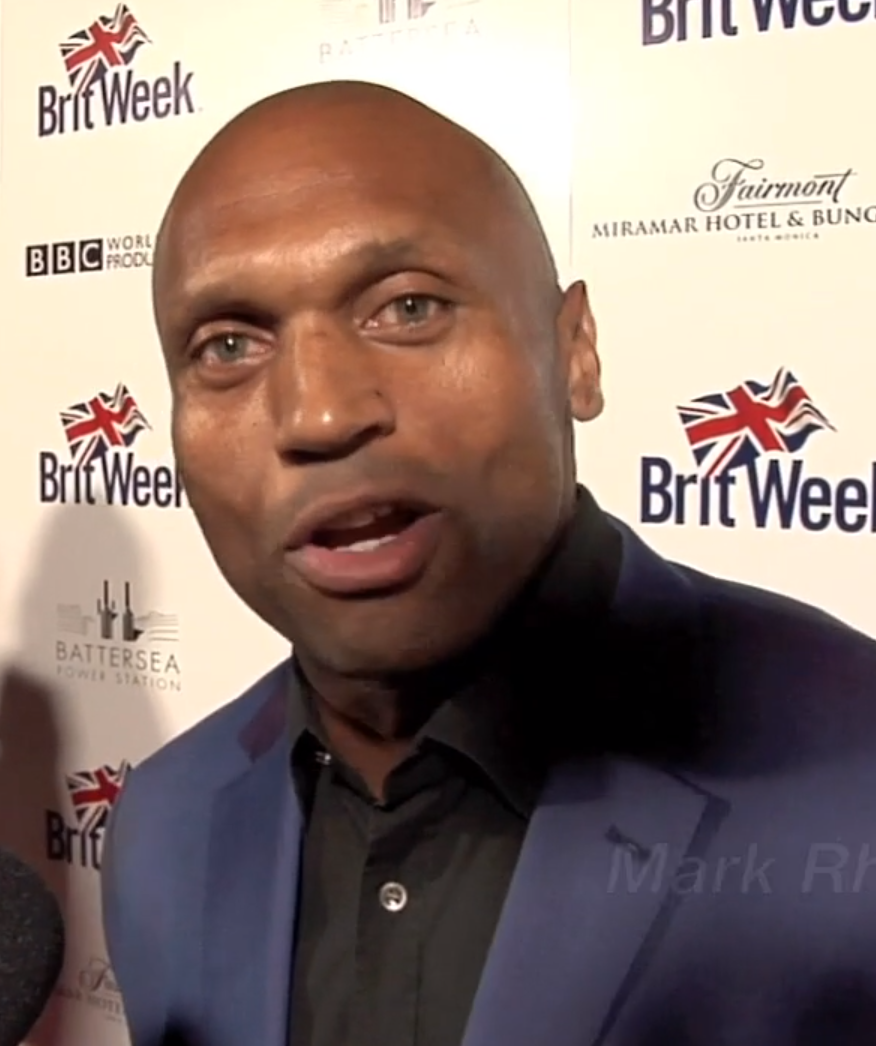
- Mark Smith (Rhino) in 2015
- Born: September 30, 1969 (age 56); Acton, London, England
- Other names: Mark Rhino Smith; Rhino; Mark Ferrol Smith
- Occupations: Actor; body builder
- Years active: 1993–present

Mark Smith (born September 30, 1969) is a British actor and body builder who starred as Rhino on the ITV show Gladiators until its cancellation in 1999. Shortly after, Smith started acting, his credits include Renford Rejects (1999-2000), EastEnders (2005), Hitchhikers Guide to the Galaxy (2005), Batman Begins (2005), Rollin' with the Nines (2006), Sinchronicity (2006), Trial & Retribution (2007), Robin Hood (2007), Pirates of the Caribbean: On Stranger Tides (2011), Argo (2012), The Last Ship (2015), Yardie (2018), The Harder They Fall (2021), and The Enforcer (2022).

== Early life ==
Smith was born in Acton, London on 30 September 1969. He lives in Los Angeles as of 2016.

== Acting career ==
=== Gladiators ===
He starred as Rhino on the ITV show Gladiators, from 1995 to 1999. In 1996, he guest-starred in a single episode of American Gladiators (1996). After Gladiators ended in 1999, due to poor viewing figures, he became an actor and producer in Los Angeles.

On 4 June 2005, at London's infamous York Hall, Smith went head to head with lottery winner Michael Carroll in a boxing match. The fight drew much publicity with the press conference ending in a brawl after Carroll lunged for Smith. On the day, the fight had to be stopped three times due to Carroll's inability to continue. The former binman later stated "I will definitely get back in the ring with him. I will train harder next time." The charity re-match took place at the Manchester Evening News Arena in September 2005. This time Carroll was knocked out in the 2nd round.

In 2022, the BBC were considering bringing back the series for a reboot after 23 years, with Rhino expressing an interest.

=== Other projects ===
Smith starred as 'Leo' in the Nickelodeon (UK & Ireland) show Renford Rejects (1999-2000) and also guest starred as 'Johnson' in the hit BBC soap EastEnders (2005). He has also appeared as a bouncer in both Sinchronicity (2006), and Trial & Retribution (2007). He starred as Karim in Robin Hood (2007).

Smith moved with his family to LA and has built his resume with projects including Pirates of the Caribbean: On Stranger Tides (2011|), Hitchhikers Guide to the Galaxy (2005), Rollin' with the Nines and an appearance as 'Shadow Warrior' in the film Batman Begins (2005). He starred in Argo in 2012, and was a regular in the series The Last Ship (2015). In 2018, he played Raggz in the film Yardie.

In 2021, he starred in the western film The Harder They Fall. In 2022, he appeared in The Enforcer.

== Other ventures ==
=== Boxing match ===
On 31 October 2023, it was announced that Rhino would face English politician Adam Brooks on the preliminary card of MF & DAZN: X Series 011 at York Hall, Bethnal Green, London, England on 17 November 2023. On the night of the fight, Rhino was defeated by Brooks via 2nd round KO.

== Filmography ==
=== Film ===
Year	Title	Role	Notes
2005	The Hitchhiker's Guide to the Galaxy	Pall Bearer	Uncredited
2005	Batman Begins	League of Shadows Warrior	Credited as Rhino
2006	Rollin' with the Nines	Beefy	Uncredited
2009	Nocturne	Driver	Short film Credited as Rhino
2009	The Scary City	Damien	
2011	The One That Got Away	Broc	Short film
2012	Bad Ass	Other Baller #3	Uncredited
2012	Argo	Evil Villain	
2013	The Frozen Ground	Airport Security	
2013	Ambushed	Doorman	Uncredited
2014	The Hungover Games	Ultimate Boxer Guy	
2014	No Good Deed	EMT	Credited as Mark Ferrol Smith
2015	What Now	Danny the Jamaican Barman	
2015	Formula 500 Man	Riley Preston	Credited as Mark Smith
2015	Creed	Conlon's Buddy	Credited as Mark "Rhino" Smith
2016	Zootopia	Officer McHorn (voice)	
2016	Criminal	Kebab Hooligan #2	Credited as Mark Smith
2017	Security	Hood Shooter #1	Credited as Mark Smith
2017	Acts of Vengeance	Police Officer	
2017	Day of the Dead: Bloodline	Alphonse	
2018	Yardie	Raggz	
2018	The Hurricane Heist	Deputy Baldwin	
2018	Guitar Man	Officer Kaddick	
2019	Angel Has Fallen	US Marshal Driver	
2021	The Harder They Fall	Carson	
2022	Heropanti 2	Mark	
2022	The Enforcer	Doom	
2025	Magazine Dreams	Bryce	

=== Television ===
Year	Title	Role	Notes
1995-1999	Gladiators	Himself (Gladiator)	Credited as Rhino; 66 episodes
1996	American Gladiators	Rhino	Episode: "International Gladiators 2: Heat 1 - Everitt vs. Maltsev & Losch vs. Odita"
1996	Saturday Live	Rhino	Episode: #1.1
1996	Happy Birthday Shirley	Rhino	Television special
1998	Blankety Blank	Himself	Credited as Rhino; Episode: "#13.6"
1999-2000	Renford Rejects	Leo	5 episodes Credited as Rhino
2002	Relic Hunter	Tall Man	Episode: "Faux Fox"; Credited as Mark Smith
2005	EastEnders	Johnson	5 episodes
2006	Michael Carroll: King of Chavs	Himself	Television movie documentary
2006	Sinchronicity	Bouncer / Bass-Bouncer	4 episodes
2007	Trial & Retribution	Nicholas - Bouncer	Episodes: "Paradise Lost: Parts 1 & 2"
2007	Robin Hood	Karim	9 episodes Credited as Mark Smith
2008	The Scary City	Damien	5 episodes
2012	Blue	Rupert	Credited as Mark Smith; Episode: "Give an Old Man a Break"
2015	Soccer Superstar	Fitness Coach	Episode: "The Beginning"
2015	The Last Ship	Ian	5 episodes
2015	NCIS: Los Angeles	Trevor	Episode: "An Unlocked Mind"
2016	Criminal Minds	Mark	Episode: "Tribute"
2017	Agents of S.H.I.E.L.D.	Trader Leader	Episode: "A Life Earned"

=== Video games ===
Year	Title	Role	Notes
2019	Indivisible	Antoine / Crowd #1 (voices)	Credited as Mark Smith

== MF–Professional boxing record ==
1 fight	0 wins	1 loss
By knockout	0	1

No.	Result	Record	Opponent	Type	Round, time	Date	Location	Notes
1	Loss	0–1	Adam Brooks	KO	2 (4), 1:40	17 Nov 2023	York Hall, London, England	
