= Wale (film) =

2018 British short film

- Directed by: Barnaby Blackburn
- Written by: Barnaby Blackburn
- Produced by: Ed Speleers, Catherine Slater, Sophie Alexander, Barnaby Blackburn
- Starring: Jamie Sives, Raphel Famotibe
- Cinematography: Robbie Bryant
- Edited by: Edward Line
- Music by: Luis Almau
- Production company: Dark Glass Films
- Distributed by: Network Ireland
- Release date: 29 April 2018 (East End Film Festival)
- Running time: 20 minutes
- Country: United Kingdom

Wale is a 2018 British short film written and directed by Barnaby Blackburn. The film, starring Jamie Sives, Raphel Famotibe, Roger Nsengiyumva and Clare Perkins, is a social-realist thriller about an ex-offender trying to ply his trade as a mechanic who is deceived by a client and framed for murder over the course of a single horrific night. It was Blackburn's debut film.

The film deals with issues of racial discrimination, social injustice and the frustrations of young people trying to reimagine themselves in London.

Wale was nominated for the BAFTA Award for Best British Short Film in 2019 and was shortlisted for Best Live Action Short Film at the 91st Academy Awards.

== Awards ==
Wale was selected and screened at over 50 film festivals around the world. The film won the top prize at a number of Oscar-qualifying festivals including the Best Short Film at Bronzelens Film Festival, the Best Narrative Short at Urbanworld Film Festival and the Grand Jury Prize at Dances With Films. In December 2019, it was announced that Wale had been shortlisted for the 91st Academy Awards.

After winning the Best Thriller award at Aesthetica Short Film Festival, Wale qualified for selection for the 2019 BAFTA Film Awards and was nominated for Best British Short Film.

== Reception ==
After the short film was released, it garnered positive reviews. Olivia Ovenden of Esquire Magazine wrote of the film, "It's a thrill-ride that speeds between two Hackneys, one filled with tower blocks and dead-ends, the other with neat terraced houses and endless chances in life."

Peter Bradshaw of The Guardian described the film as a "Hitchcockian thriller" and suggested "Perhaps Blackburn can develop this as a full-length feature because I need to know what happens. The suspense is killing me."
