= To Dream =

2016 British drama film

- Theatrical film poster
- Directed by: Nicole Albarelli
- Written by: Nicole Albarelli
- Produced by: Nicole Albarelli
- Starring: Edward Hayter; Freddie Thorp; Frank Jakeman; Diana Vickers; Adam Deacon; Angela Peters; Kirsty Dillon; Billy Barratt
- Cinematography: Andrew Rodger; Christopher Sharman
- Edited by: Nathan Perry-Greene
- Music by: Fabien Waltmann
- Release dates: 14 September 2016 (BUFF); 14 December 2018 (UK)
- Running time: 80 mins.
- Country: United Kingdom
- Language: English

To Dream is a 2016 British coming-of-age independent drama film, directed and written by Nicole Albarelli. The film stars Edward Hayter, Freddie Thorp, Frank Jakeman, Adam Deacon, Diana Vickers, Kirsty Dillon, Angela Peters, and Billy Barratt. It premiered at the British Urban Film Festival in 2016, before its limited theatrical release throughout the United Kingdom in 2018.

== Synopsis ==
Two self-destructive teenagers won't let anything come between their friendship and their ultimate plan, but when dysfunctional family life becomes intolerable, loyalty leads one to make a choice that will change their lives forever.

== Cast ==
- Edward Hayter as Luke (teenager)
  - Riley Keith as Luke (preteen)
    - Billy Barratt as Luke (child)
- Freddie Thorp as Tommy (teenager)
  - Chi Thomas Hockey as Tommy (preteen)
- Frank Jakeman as Charlie
- Diana Vickers as Nikki
- Adam Deacon as Easy
- Angela Peters as Grace
- Kirsty Dillon as Helen
- Jon Campling as Mr. Soso
- Cassie Box as Tommy's Mum
- Chelsea Edge as Lex
- Amanda Halipi as Mia

== Reception ==
Chuck Foster of Film Threat awarded the film 9/10 stars, lauding that "The performances shine as well. Both Edward Hayter and Freddie Thorp brilliantly command their roles through arrogance and vulnerability, channeling the horrifying uncertainty of becoming a young adult. Frank Jakeman deserves an Oscar for Best Supporting Actor as a broken father struggling to raise his directionless son. Adam Deacon delivers a chilling performance in his portrayal of a psychotic drug dealer, and Diana Vickers perfectly balances the frivolity of being a young party girl with the innocence of being thrown in the middle of Luke's and Tommy's tumultuous relationship."

Elinor Perry-Smith of SEEN praised the filmmaker, stating "Nicole Albarelli relishes the interiority of her characters and resists cliché, establishing Tommy's and Luke's dignity and complexity with humour and pathos." Joseph McLauchlan of Take One Cinema applauded it for being "a tightly plotted and emotionally charged debut that refuses to pull any punches".

Meanwhile, Grace Williams of Battle Royale With Cheese compared Albarelli to Andrea Arnold, but chided the film, stating "there seems to be something missing which could have given the film a final varnish, which is a more interesting script". And Tom Keogh of Video Librarian derided the film, calling it "a miserable, unimaginative kitchen-sink drama" and rating it 1/4 stars.
