= Rollin' with the Nines =

2006 British film directed by Julian Gilbey

- DVD cover
- Directed by: Julian Gilbey
- Written by: Julian Gilbey, Will Gilbey
- Produced by: James Hutchins; Pikki; Geoff Austin; Alex Rofaila
- Starring: Vas Blackwood; Terry Stone; Mark Smith; Billy Murray; Naomi Taylor; Simon Webbe; Jason Flemyng; Robbie Gee
- Release date: 21 April 2006
- Running time: 92 minutes
- Country: United Kingdom
- Language: English

Rollin' with the Nines is a 2006 British film set mainly in South London, about a rap group turned drug dealers. The film stars Vas Blackwood, Robbie Gee, Mark Smith, Simon Webbe and Billy Murray. Small appearances are made by Jason Flemyng as well as several core members of the growing UK Grime scene, including Dizzee Rascal, Rodney P, Kano, Life, Wiley, and Lady Sovereign among others.

== Plot ==
The movie begins with the UK Hip Hop group "Time Served" getting used to living the high life as rap stars. This all comes crashing down however when one of their members Too Fine is killed in a drive-by because he owes a drug dealer, Temper, money. On returning to her flat after the murder, Too Fine's sister Hope walks in on the same drug dealer looking for his money. After telling her she has two days left to pay or he is going to kill her family, he rapes her and leaves. While this is happening the other two members of the group, Rage and Finny find out that due to being signed as a three-man group, their contract is now void.

Under the premise of paying him back, Hope goes to Temper's house with a sawn-off shotgun. After killing him she goes back to Finny's. Knowing that Temper's two side-kicks, Chosen-one and Chronic, will come hunting for her, Finny, Rage and their friend Pushy decide to finish them off. Turning up at their favourite night-club, they kill the two, catching a waitress in the crossfire.

Hope is then contacted by big time crime lord David Brumby, who wants the money Temper owed him. She instead convinces him to work with her instead, and with Finny, Rage and Pushy, go into the drug dealing business. While this is going on, DS Andy White is on the case looking for the killers of the night club waitress.

White and his cohorts raid a Yardie drug-dealer and find out that Too Fine and Pushy are connected. Knowing this they begin tailing Pushy and his known affiliates, Rage and Finny. Noticing they are being followed on the way to a drug deal, they attempted to give their pursuers the shake. Finny although is captured after their cars rolls off the road and they attempt to get away on foot. In order to avoid going down for multiple offences (White also threatens to have him killed in his cell) he fingers everyone else involved.

The police round up everyone involved, including Rage, Pushy and Brumby, but not Hope. Knowing Finny is the grass, Pushy calls Hope, not fully believing him she hangs up on him. Finny then comes round to Hope's to get her to leave London with him. Now knowing the truth she stabs Finny, dumping his body in a car. With his only witness dead, White has to let Rage, Pushy and Brumby go. Thinking they have gotten off, Rage and Pushy go out to celebrate, but get gunned down in the car park of a pub by Brumby's men, on the orders of DS White, who says he'll turn a "blind eye" to Brumby now.

== Cast ==
- Vas Blackwood as Finny - The front man of the group Time Served, he also used to be in an under-ground rap group beforehand. The other members of the group are killed in a drive by, and he later gets arrested for armed robbery.
- Simon Webbe as Too Fine - Before becoming successful in Time Served he used to be a drug dealer, and his unpaid street debts with Temper are what get him killed, and sparks off the whole movie's storyline.
- Roffem Morgan as Rage - Described as a "Nasty little bastard" he served time in a young offender's institute with Too Fine.
- Robbie Gee as Pushy - A friend of the group but not a member, at the start of the movie he is a small-time marijuana dealer, but joins in with Hope to start selling Brumby's drugs.
- Naomi Taylor as Hope - The sister of Too Fine, she convinces Brumby to go in with her after killing his main dealer Temper.
- Billy Murray as David Brumby - The main drug dealer at the top, he imports the drugs from Holland for Temper, and later Hope to sell. It is possible he is from Essex as DS White says to him, "You're a long fucking way from Essex boys".
- Terry Stone as DS Andy White - The anti-hero of the film, while he is a corrupt officer, who sells confiscated drugs on the side he is dedicated to helping the people that cannot help themselves. While his methods are questionable and extremely heavy-handed, he gets results. After failing to get the killers of the night-club waitress (stating he does not care about the drug dealers that were killed, just her) legally, he orders them killed by Brumby.
- Mark Smith as Beefy - Corrupt bodyguard who is out for himself.

== Awards ==
- Won the Jury Prize at the Raindance Film Festival 2005
- Nomination for Director Julian Gilbey at the 60th British Academy Film Awards for the Carl Foreman Award

== Soundtrack ==
=== Track listing ===
1. Ms. Dynamite & Akala : "Don't Do That"
2. Hyper Hitman & S. Dee : "Back Down"
3. Life & Rodney P : "Ghetto War Cry"
4. Kano : "Buss Dat"
5. JC, Major Yardie & Shabba D : "Streets"
6. Shy Fx : "On The Run"
7. Life, Skinnyman & Sway : "The Whole Nine"
8. Northstar : "Rollin' with the Nines"
9. Swiss : "Talk 2 Me"
10. Camilla, Gemma Fox & Lady Fury : "Girls Gotta Do"
11. Daze, Hyper Hitman & J2K : "Dutty Life"
12. P.D.C : "Gangster"
13. Dizzee Rascal & Klass A : "Money"
14. Simon Webbe & UK Team : "2 Step"
15. S Elle : "U Choose"
16. Kano : "Ghetto Kid"
17. Corey J, Gappy Ranks & Jagwa : "Make Way"
18. Sizzla : "Rise to the Occasion"
19. Sizzla : "Wrath"
