= Once in the Life =

- Directed by: Laurence Fishburne
- Written by: Laurence Fishburne
- Based on: Riff-Raff by Laurence Fishburne
- Produced by: David Bushell; Helen Sugland; Laurence Fishburne
- Starring: Laurence Fishburne; Titus Welliver; Eamonn Walker; Paul Calderón; Annabella Sciorra
- Cinematography: Richard Turner
- Edited by: Bill Pankow
- Music by: Branford Marsalis
- Production companies: Cinema Gypsy Productions; Shooting Gallery
- Distributed by: Trimark Home Video
- Release date: October 27, 2000
- Running time: 104 minutes
- Country: United States
- Language: English

Once in the Life is a 2000 American direct-to-video crime film written, directed and starring Laurence Fishburne. He adapted the script from his own play, Riff Raff.

== Plot ==
Once you're in the life of drug dealing and organized crime, can you get out? During a brief jail stay two half-brothers, who had rarely seen each other while growing up begin to connect. One of them is 20/20 Mike, a name given because he can sense people nearby, who concocts a scheme in which him and his brother Billy will steal drugs from young couriers. The heist goes awry when the junkie brother, Billy, shoots the victims of the theft. The brothers hole up in an abandoned building, and 20/20 Mike seeks help from an old cellmate, Tony, who he thinks is out of the life of organized crime. It turns out that they have stolen Tony's dope—and Tony's boss wants the two thieves dead. "Is there any way out?"

== Cast ==
- Laurence Fishburne – 20/20 Mike - A street-smart ex-convict who plans a drug robbery that sets the events of the film in motion.
- Titus Welliver – Torch - Mike’s heroin-addicted half-brother who participates in the robbery and contributes to its failure.
- Eamonn Walker – Tony - Mike’s former prison associate who is secretly working for the crime boss pursuing them.
- Gregory Hines – Ruffhouse - A criminal enforcer connected to Manny Rivera who helps pursue those responsible for the robbery.
- Michael Paul Chan – Buddha - An associate within Manny Rivera’s organization who appears among the group involved in the drug operation
- Annabella Sciorra – Maxine - Tony’s partner who is used as leverage to force his cooperation.
- Paul Calderón – Manny Rivera - A powerful drug lord who seeks revenge after his operation is targeted.
- Andres Titus – Hector (as Andres 'Dres' Titus) - A courier involved in the drug operation who becomes a target of Mike’s robbery.
- Madison Riley – Precious
- Jim Breuer - Pizzaman (timestamp 13:35)

== Production ==
Once in the Life was the directorial debut of Laurence Fishburne, and adapted from his own 1994 play Riff Raff. Much of the film was shot in the Hotel Rivieria in Newark, New Jersey.

== Reception ==
Film critic Roger Ebert gave the film a mixed review (2 out of 4 stars), describing it as “an actor’s exercise” that feels overly stage-bound and reliant on dialogue, despite strong performances.

The review aggregator website Rotten Tomatoes reported a 28% approval rating based on 25 reviews, and an average rating of 4.7/10. The site's critical consensus reads, "Once in a Life is a promising directorial effort by Laurence Fishburne. But the story is too conventional and similar to the many ghetto action/dramas that come before it."
