= Exodus (2007 British film) =

- Film poster
- Directed by: Penny Woolcock
- Written by: Penny Woolcock
- Produced by: Ruth Kenley-Letts; Andrew Litvin
- Starring: Bernard Hill; Clare-Hope Ashitey; Daniel Percival; Louis Constant; Tom Wiles
- Cinematography: Jakob Ihre
- Edited by: Brand Thumim
- Music by: Malcolm Lindsay
- Release date: 4 September 2007 (Venice)
- Running time: 111 minutes
- Country: United Kingdom
- Language: English

Exodus is a contemporary retelling of the Biblical story of Exodus, that was released in 2007. It was directed by Penny Woolcock and was shot on location in Margate, Kent, England. The film, which had a working title 'The Margate Exodus' features the burning of a large sculpture of a man made out of waste by Antony Gormley. The film was shown on Channel 4 on 19 November 2007.

== Synopsis ==
The leader of the country, called Pharaoh (who is plagued by voices), declares war upon society's 'undesirables'. Drug abusers, refugees, criminals and the homeless are all considered equally worthless and entered into a restricted ghetto, called 'Dreamland' (set in a then dilapidated fun fair of that name, since restored), where they cannot leave.

When Moses learns he was adopted by Pharaoh and is actually the son of an asylum seeker, he shuns his life of privilege to lead the ghetto's inhabitants in a revolt against his father.

A series of 'plagues' echoing the biblical story attack the inhabitants of the 'promised land' including algal blooms which turn the sea red (like the first plague of turning the River Nile to blood) and a computer virus (possibly a modern reworking of the sickness in live stock plague).

The plagues are treated as acts of terrorism by those in the promised land and violent reprisals are sought against those in Dreamland.
