= Jeremy Wooding =

British film director, producer and writer

- Occupation: Film director
- Works: Burning Men; Blood Moon; Bollywood Queen

Jeremy Wooding is a British film director, producer and writer; he also directs for television.

== Career ==
Wooding is best known for his work on Burning Men, Blood Moon and Bollywood Queen.

== Selected filmography ==
- Bollywood Queen (2002)
- Peep Show (2003)
- Dani's House (2008)
- The Magnificent Eleven (2013)
- Blood Moon (2014)
- Burning Men (2019)
