= Paul Chequer =

English actor

Paul James Chequer is an English actor best known for starring in the British drama As If as Jamie Collier on Channel 4 from 2001 to 2004 and the BBC Three drama Sinchronicity, as Nathan, in 2006.

He later appeared as Eugene Jones in the British science fiction television series Torchwood in the episode "Random Shoes", broadcast on 10 December 2006.

== Background ==
Chequer graduated from Guildhall School of Music and Drama in 1998.

Born in 1975 in Portsmouth, Hampshire, Chequer also reads the Chivers Children's Audio book of Roderick Gordon and Brian William's "Tunnels" series.

He lives in London with his wife and two sons.

== Filmography ==
Year	Title	Format	Role	Notes
1999	Tea with Mussolini	Film	Wilfred	
1999	Holby City	TV series	Neil Longford	Series 2, Puppy Love
2001–2004	As If	TV series	Jamie Collier	60 episodes
2005	Like Father Like Son	TV movie	Sergeant Renton	
2006	Murder City	TV series	James Morgan	Series 2, Just Seventeen
2006	Silent Witness	TV series	Nick Doe	2 episodes Terminus: Part 1 and Terminus: Part 2
2006	Sinchronicity	TV series	Nathan	6 episodes
2006	The Magic Flute	Film	Sarastro's Guard	
2006	Torchwood	TV series	Eugene Jones	Season 1 Episode 9 Random Shoes
2009	Hotel Babylon	TV series	Darren	3 episodes
2010–2017	Sherlock	TV series	DI Dimmock	2 episodes (S1 E2 The Blind Banker and S4 E1 The Six Thatchers)
2012	Whitechapel	TV series	Nathan Merceron	2 episodes
2012	Private Peaceful	Film	Corporal	
2013	Neverwhere	Radio Play	Gary/Second Guard	
2017	Casualty	TV series	Arnold Letts	Series 31, The Good Samaritan
