= Plastic (2014 film) =

- DVD cover
- Directed by: Julian Gilbey
- Written by: Chris Howard; Julian Gilbey; Will Gilbey
- Produced by: Sandro Forte; Chris Howard; Daniel Toland; Terry Stone
- Starring: Ed Speleers; Alfie Allen; Will Poulter; Sebastian de Souza; Emma Rigby; Mem Ferda; Graham McTavish; Thomas Kretschmann
- Cinematography: Peter Wignall
- Edited by: Julian Gilbey; Will Gilbey
- Music by: Chad Hobson
- Production company: Gateway Films
- Distributed by: Paramount Pictures
- Release date: 2 May 2014
- Running time: 102 minutes
- Country: United Kingdom
- Language: English
- Budget: £4,303,000
- Box office: £7,000,000

Plastic is a 2014 British crime comedy film directed by Julian Gilbey, who co-wrote the script with Will Gilbey and Chris Howard. It stars Ed Speleers, Will Poulter, Alfie Allen, Sebastian de Souza and Emma Rigby. The film is purportedly based on a true story involving con artist Saq Mumtaz.

== Plot ==
Four college students, Sam, Fordy, Yatesey and Rafa, are running a credit card fraud scheme. One night they rob a person in his car; he turns out to be an associate of a gangster named Marcel.

== Cast ==
- Ed Speleers as Sam
- Will Poulter as Fordy
- Alfie Allen as Yatesy
- Sebastian De Souza as Rafa
- Emma Rigby as Frankie
- Mem Ferda as Tariq
- Lisa Maffia as Kelly
- Malese Jow as Beth
- Amelle Berrabah as Fionna
- Thomas Kretschmann as Marcel
- Graham McTavish as Steve
- Michael Bisping as Kasper
- Robbie Gee as Mr X

== Production ==
On 6 December 2012, Ed Speleers, Will Poulter and Alfie Allen were announced to star in the film, with Julian Gilbey set to direct and Chris Howard, Julian Gilbey and Will Gilbey set to write the film. International distribution rights were licensed by Cinema Management Group.

On 10 December 2012, Gateway Films announced principal photography of the film which took place in Brunei, London, Manchester and Miami.

== Reception ==
On review aggregator Rotten Tomatoes, the film holds an approval rating of 17% based on 30 reviews, with an average rating of 3.33/10. The website's critics consensus reads: "Far-fetched, frantically overstuffed, and unfunny, Plastic seems to use its title as a goal as much as a description." On Metacritic, the film has a weighted average score of 32 out of 100, based on 10 critics, indicating "generally unfavorable reviews".

Guy Lodge of Variety said "The title says it all in this cheap, laborious junior heist thriller from British B-movie journeyman Julian Gilbey". Geoffrey Macnab of The Independent "A nasty streak of casual sexism runs through an already unpleasant and absurdly far-fetched film". Stephen Dalton of The Hollywood Reporter said "All champagne and strippers, conspicuous consumption and witless machismo, Plastic is a contemporary British heist movie that already feels dated, as if it were made before the bubble burst on Guy Ritchie's comic book gangster voyeurism".

There were, however, some positive reviews. Gary Goldstein of the Los Angeles Times stated that "As mindless entertainment goes, it's a pretty watchable time-passer.", and Ben Kenigsberg of The New York Times said "It's hard to escape the sense that 'Plastic' is itself a cheap knockoff, but the point is not to look too closely".

In an interview with The Guardian whilst promoting his film, The Maze Runner, actor Will Poulter expressed his disdain for starring in the film, describing the film as "bad" and saying "It’s really tough, man. Because it’s shaming. And the worst thing is thinking someone will think you did it for dishonourable reasons. I’m not shifting the blame. I recognise my responsibility to that film. But I’ve tried to shake it off since". He closed out his interview by saying "I’ve got the one film that I regret out of my way. And I don’t intend to make another one."
