= Neverwhere (radio play) =

2013 radio play of the Neil Gaiman novel

- Genre: Fantasy
- Country of origin: United Kingdom
- Language(s): English
- Created by: Neil Gaiman
- Written by: Neil Gaiman; Dirk Maggs
- Directed by: Dirk Maggs; Heather Larmour
- Produced by: Heather Larmour
- Original release: 16 March – 22 March 2013
- No. of series: 1
- No. of episodes: 6

Neverwhere is a radio drama based on the 1996 novel Neverwhere by Neil Gaiman. It was dramatised by Dirk Maggs. The theme music is by James Hannigan.

== Broadcast ==
On Saturday 16 March 2013, BBC Radio 4 and BBC Radio 4 Extra broadcast the first, hour-long, episode of Neverwhere. The subsequent five half-hour episodes were broadcast throughout the following week on Radio 4 Extra (in mono on DAB), and made available worldwide after broadcast on BBC iPlayer. It was rebroadcast on BBC Radio 4 starting on Dec 25th 2013 and continuing for 6 days.

== Cast ==
Character	Actor
Richard Mayhew	James McAvoy
Lady Door	Natalie Dormer
The Marquis de Carabas	David Harewood
Hunter	Sophie Okonedo
The Angel Islington	Benedict Cumberbatch
Mr. Croup	Anthony Head
Mr. Vandemar	David Schofield
Old Bailey	Bernard Cribbins
Lamia	Lucy Cohu
The Abbott	George Harris
The Earl	Sir Christopher Lee
Jessica	Romola Garai
Figgis/The Fop With No Name	Neil Gaiman
Tooley	Andrew Sachs
Fuliginous/Ruislip/Blackfriar	Don Gilet
Sable/Sump/Clarence/Homeless man	Abdul Salis
Gary/Second Guard	Paul Chequer
Anaesthesia/Female Tenant/Match Girl	Yasmin Paige
Lord Ratspeaker	Johnny Vegas
Varney/Homeless man/Letting Agent/First Guard	Stephen Marcus
Sylvia/Old woman/Dream Hawker/Mother...	Karen Archer
Lord Portico/Stockton	Jon Glover
Iliaster/Halvard	Paul Stonehouse
Dagvard/Dunnikin/Hammersmith	Ben Crowe
The Herald	Robert Blythe (actor)
Lear	David Tughan
Underground Announcer/Footman	Patrick Brennan
Little Girl	Clodagh Casey

== Episodes ==
1. London Below (running time: 56:56)
2. Earl's Court (running time: 28:26)
3. The Angel Islington (running time: 28:27)
4. The Black Friars (running time: 28:24)
5. Market Afloat (running time: 28:29)
6. The Key (running time: 28:27)

== Spin-off ==
The short story How the Marquis Got His Coat Back was subsequently adapted in 2016. The cast included Paterson Joseph, Bernard Cribbins, Adrian Lester, Mitch Benn and Don Warrington.
