= Elinor Crawley =

Welsh actress (born 1991)

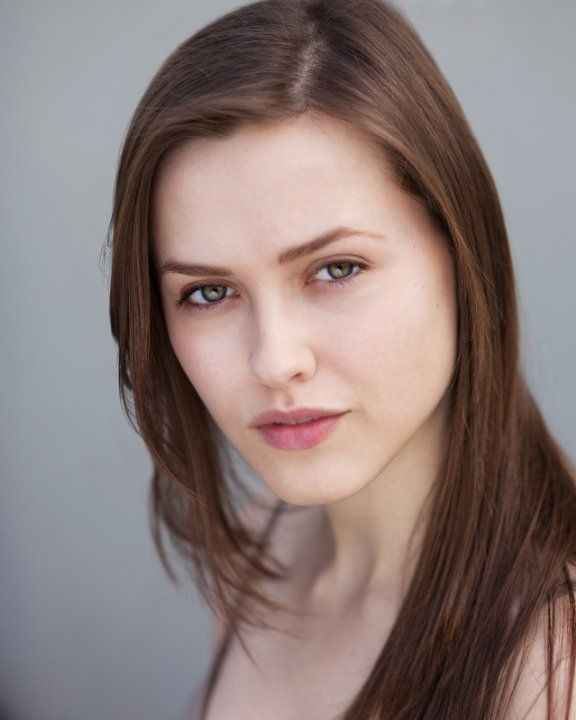
- Born: 8 November 1991 (age 34); Cardiff, South Glamorgan, Wales
- Occupation: Actress
- Years active: 2007–present

Elinor Crawley (born 8 November 1991) is a Welsh actress. She is best known for her role as Thyri in the television series Vikings and for portraying Cecily of York in The White Queen.

== Early life and education ==
Crawley was diagnosed with Type 1 diabetes when she was nine years old. She attended Whitchurch High School and trained at The Workshop, a film and television performance training project that is based in Cardiff.

== Personal life ==
She is a supporter of the charity Diabetes UK. Her sister is a paediatrician.

== Filmography ==
=== Film ===
Year	Title	Role	Notes
2010	Submarine	Abby Smuts	
2014	The Tap Tap Lady	Jennifer	Short film
2015	Bridgend	Laurel	
2016	The Thunderers	Mari	Filming
2016	Victrix	Viviane (Lady of the Lake)	Pre-production
2019	Burning Men	Susie	
2020	Glia	Catherine Devereux	

=== Television ===
Year	Title	Role	Notes
2007	The Sarah Jane Adventures	'Bubbleshock' advert girl	Episode: Invasion of the Bane
2011	Young Dracula	School Girl	
2011	Tati's Hotel	Dizzee	
2011	Ideal	Jess	
2012	Doctors	Millie Bowman	Episode: The Cat's Meow
2012	World Without End	Joan	Episode: Queen
2013	The White Queen	Cecily of York	
2013–15	Vikings	Thyri	Recurring in series 1, guest in series 3
2014	Law & Order: UK	Abby Glendon	Episode: Hard Stop
2015	Ordinary Lies	Sarah-Jane	
2023	Steeltown Murders	Young Karina Bethell	
