= The Poor School =

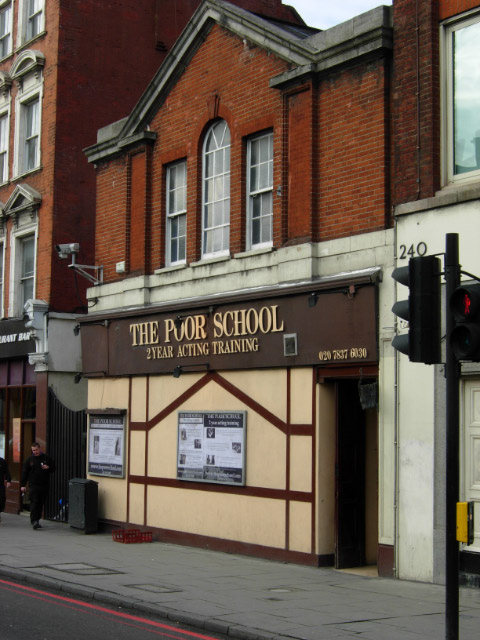
- The Poor School

Location
- 51.5311°N 0.1199°W

Information
- Type: drama
- Established: 1986
- Founder: Barbara Caister
- Closed: 2018
- Website: theschoollondon.co.uk

The Poor School and Workhouse Theatre was a drama school situated in King's Cross, London, United Kingdom.

The Poor School was created in 1986 by former Royal Central School of Speech and Drama vocal coach Barbara Caister in response to the need for first-class acting training which was financially within the reach of all, or almost all, and later taken over by her son, Paul Caister who ran the school for over 30 years. The two-year training programme at the school was in operation for 32 years, with graduates enjoying careers in theatre, film, radio, stage and comedy; ex-students have founded their own companies (Ridiculusmus and Sturdy Beggars, most notably) and have become producers, directors, casting directors and agents. The school also offered short courses.

The Poor School was not accredited by Drama UK and did not issue diplomas or certifications.

It was announced in November 2016 that The Poor School was no longer accepting new students and the school closed at the end of July 2018. Its founder declined to comment on the reasons for the closure.

Shortly before The Poor School closed its doors, several long-serving staff members established The School in nearby Canonbury, offering a two-year acting training and short courses. Like The Poor School, training at The School is timetabled around evenings and weekends to allow students to work and earn whilst they train.

== Alumni ==
- Arron Blake
- Sarah Frankcom – Director, Royal Exchange, Manchester
- Ricky Groves
- James Holmes – actor in the BBC sitcom Miranda
- Jenny Kendall-Tobias – British radio presenter (BBC Guernsey)
- Zoe Lyons – stand-up comic
- Lindsay Armaou – Member of pop band B*witched
- Francis Magee
- Ryan Molloy – Jersey Boys in West End
- Lucy Russell
- Mark Wakeling – Co Founder Actors' Temple
- Jessie Wallace – EastEnders
- Sasha Behar
- Micah Balfour
- Howard Antony
- William Beck – Casualty
- Vera Chok – theatre, screen and radio actor
- Andrew Novell
- Edward Hayter
