= Solomon Kane (film) =

- Theatrical release poster
- Directed by: M. J. Bassett
- Written by: M. J. Bassett
- Based on: Characters by Robert E. Howard
- Produced by: Paul Berrow; Samuel Hadida; Kevan Van Thompson
- Starring: James Purefoy; Max von Sydow; Rachel Hurd-Wood; Pete Postlethwaite
- Cinematography: Dan Laustsen
- Edited by: Andrew MacRitchie
- Music by: Klaus Badelt
- Production companies: Essential Entertainment; Davis Films; Czech Anglo Productions; Wandering Star Pictures
- Distributed by: Metropolitan Filmexport (France); Entertainment Film Distributors (United Kingdom)
- Release dates: 23 December 2009 (France); 19 February 2010 (UK)
- Running time: 104 minutes
- Countries: France; United Kingdom; Czech Republic
- Language: English
- Budget: $40 million
- Box office: $19.6 million

Solomon Kane is a 2009 sword and sorcery film based on the pulp magazine character of the same name created in 1928 by Robert E. Howard. Written and directed by M. J. Bassett, the film stars James Purefoy in the title role. Despite obtaining the rights in 1997, filming did not begin until January 2008.

The film is an original story for the Kane character and was intended to be the first of a trilogy. The plot follows a redemption story for Kane, from the end of his life as a privateer, through the salvation of his soul by rescuing a Puritan girl and the beginning of his life as the Puritan avenger of the source material. It was produced by a consortium of French, Czech, and British companies and mostly filmed in the Czech Republic. The film was first shown at the 2009 Toronto International Film Festival. It went on general release in France, Spain, and the UK over the end of 2009 and the beginning of 2010. It has a Rotten Tomatoes rating of 67%.

The screenplay was novelised by award-winning fantasy author Ramsey Campbell.

== Plot ==
In the year 1600, in North Africa, English privateer Solomon Kane leads his ship's crew into battle against the Ottoman defenders of a fortress town. After defeating the defenders, Kane and his men raid the fortress, where most of the crew are killed by demons. Kane fights his way to the throne room, but, before he can loot the riches, he is confronted by the "Devil's Reaper", a demon who tells him his soul is forfeit to Satan after his life of sin. Kane rejects his fate and jumps out of a window to escape.

One year later, Kane has returned to England and found sanctuary in a monastery, renouncing violence and donating his wealth to the Church in hopes of finding redemption. After a prophetic dream, the abbot expels Kane. On the road, Kane is ambushed by robbers who mock his vow of pacifism and leave him for dead. He is found and treated by the Crowthorns, a Puritan family traveling west to the New World. They find a witch, who marks Meredith Crowthorn. Later, they are ambushed by followers of sorcerer Malachi who kidnap Meredith and kill her father and brothers. Kane renounces his vows and swears to rescue Meredith.

Kane battles Malachi's followers across the countryside, rescuing many captives but not finding Meredith. On his journey, he meets a deranged priest who explains Malachi's followers are taking the weaker survivors of their raids as slaves and corrupting the strong into soldiers. The priest tries to feed Kane to his parishioners, who have become ghouls, but Kane escapes, only to face the robbers who attacked him earlier, now corrupted servants of Malachi. He kills two robbers and interrogates the survivor, who says Meredith is dead. Kane throws the robber to the ghouls, and, believing his quest for redemption has failed, drinks to excess at a country inn. Former shipmates recognize him and try to recruit him as a leader of a resistance against Malachi, but Kane refuses. The inn is attacked by Malachi's followers, led by his lieutenant the Masked Rider. They crucify the leaders of the resistance, including Kane. As Kane hangs on the cross, Meredith cries out his name from her cage in the back of the raiders' wagon; Kane realizes he still has a chance to save her and pulls himself free. Before Malachi's remaining men can finish him, they are killed by survivors of the resistance, who take Kane to safety. Kane is healed by a pagan woman and becomes anxious to confront the raiders.

Malachi used to be a healer before making a bargain with the Devil. He now lives in Kane's ancestral home, from which Kane had been expelled in his youth after defying his father. Kane leads the rebels into the castle via an underground passage, and, as they fight Malachi's minions, Kane heads for the dungeons and frees many captives. There, he finds his father, who reveals the Masked Rider is Kane's older brother Marcus, whom Kane thought he had accidentally killed after his banishment. Instead, Marcus was rendered comatose, and when healers failed to revive him, his father turned to Malachi. Disfigured and turned to Malachi's will, Marcus became the Masked Rider. Kane reluctantly kills his father at his request, then heads to the throne room to confront Malachi. Kane finds Meredith in a cage; as she warns him of a trap, Marcus stabs him in the back. Kane tries to reason with Marcus, but they engage in a duel; Kane wins after setting Marcus on fire and decapitating him. Malachi uses Meredith's blood to release a demon sent to claim Kane's soul, but Kane kills Malachi and sacrifices himself to close the portal; both Malachi and the creature are sucked back through it, leaving Kane unconscious on the floor. He awakens and explains to Meredith that he has finally redeemed his soul. Kane buries his father and brother and reunites Meredith with her mother. He assumes a new mission: to roam the Earth combating the forces of darkness.

== Cast ==
- James Purefoy as Solomon Kane
- Max von Sydow as Josiah Kane
- Rachel Hurd-Wood as Meredith Crowthorn
- Mackenzie Crook as Father Michael
- Pete Postlethwaite as William Crowthorn
- Ian Whyte as The Devil's Reaper
- Alice Krige as Katherine Crowthorn
- Ben Steel as Fletcher
- Jason Flemyng as Malachi
- Samuel Roukin as Marcus Kane
- Philip Winchester as Henry Telford
- Rory McCann as McNess
- Geoff Bell as Beard

== Production ==
Wandering Star optioned the film and book publishing rights to Solomon Kane in 1997 from the Robert E. Howard Estate. In 2001, it was announced that Christopher Lambert was offered the role of Kane and was seriously considering it. At this point Don Murphy was a producer on the film, with Samuel Hadida of Davis Film and Paul Berrow and Michael Berrow of Wandering Star Pictures, and was attempting to set up the film with New Line Cinema.

Murphy left the project in 2003 under a cloud when the negotiations fell apart with New Line. Things went quiet for a while, during which time several scripts were developed around the African adventures of Solomon Kane from the classic text. Then M. J. Bassett was hired as writer and director of the film, with a brief to write an origin story based loosely on the Howard poems and classic text, and in August 2006 she finished writing the script. Finally on 1 October 2007, it was announced that James Purefoy was cast as the lead.

Principal photography began in Prague on 14 January 2008 and was scheduled for a 12‑week shoot. Bassett says of Purefoy that he "is a delight to work with; he is giving his heart and soul to this. He's in brilliant physical shape and his sword fighting is just brilliant to behold and he's finding depth and sophistication within the character in ways I really hoped he would".

As of the end of February 2008, sets were still being built for the later part of the production, and Max Von Sydow and Mackenzie Crook had yet to begin shooting. Jan Cileček, a Czech artist produced a number of sculptures for the film and there are some photographs available on his website. Some aerial sequences were shot at Stanhope and St. Abbs in the Scottish Borders.

On 16 April 2008, Bassett posted a message on her blog saying "Principal photography is completed on Kane. Now for the long-haul of post-production to get it all into shape". She also stated that everything was set up for the future parts of the trilogy, which "will tap more completely into Howard's original stories". Finally, she mentioned that "the final scenes of the film were shot in England on the North Devon coast. It was all done on a private estate which used to belong to the real Sir Richard Grenville". On 7 April 2009, Bassett announced that production of the film was complete.

On 23 October 2009, Bassett announced on her blog that "Kane is slowly gearing up for its first set of release dates at the end of this year and early 2010". According to Paradox Entertainment CEO Fredrik Malmberg, the film's budget was $40 million.

== Release ==
=== Theatrical ===
Solomon Kane's world premiere was on 16 September 2009 at the Toronto International Film Festival. The film was featured at the 2009 San Diego Comic-Con, which Basset and Purefoy both attended. It was released in France on 23 December 2009. It was released in Spain on 1 January 2010.

=== United Kingdom ===
The United Kingdom theatrical release was on 19 February 2010; in its first week it opened at seventh place in the UK top ten with a weekend gross of £611,886 across 259 cinemas.

=== Worldwide ===
According to Bassett's blog, the North American wide release of the film was delayed for legal reasons. The film's American premiere took place at ActionFest on April 12, 2012. Bassett announced on his blog that the film was acquired by The Weinstein Company and would be released through their subdivision Radius (co-founded by Tom Quinn, who also co-founded ActionFest) for the US. The film was released on August 24 on VOD and September 28 in theaters.

=== Home media ===
The DVD was released in the UK on 28 June 2010. It was the best selling DVD in week commencing 5 July 2010.

The film was released on both Blu-ray and DVD to the home market in North America on 16 July 2013 by Starz/Anchor Bay.

The US extras features included: Anamorphic 2.35:1 with a 5.1 English Dolby Digital track, Subtitles in English and Spanish only, Commentary with Michael J. Bassett and James Purefoy, The Making Of Solomon Kane (11:46), Cave Fight deleted scene (2:26), The Creation Of The Fire Demon (2:00), Interview With Writer/Director Michael J. Bassett (8:51), Interview with Actor James Purefoy (8:31) and Original Concept Art (1:15).

A 2 disc Collector's Edition was released in France by Metropolitan.

French extras features include: English and French audio, optional Subtitles in French, Introduction by the director, Commentary with James Purefoy and Michael J. Bassett, Interactive Diary, Partial interactive movie playback, Comparative film Storyboard of 7 sequences, Cave Fight Deleted Scene (with video introduction of the director), Making Of, Interview with Michael J. Bassett, Interview with James Purefoy, Interview with producers Samuel Hadida and Paul Berrow, Creation of the Fire Demon, Closing sequence Design, Production Drawings and Posters, Music Video, Trailer, Presentation at Comic Con.

It was announced on 9 March 2012 that the film would have its Southeast US Regional Premiere as the Opening Night film of ActionFest 2012 on 12 April 2012. This marks the second year in a row that a film starring James Purefoy and with sword and stunt coordination by Richard Ryan opened ActionFest (after 2011's Ironclad).

== Soundtrack ==
1. Opening Battle
2. Aftermath
3. Reaper
4. Marked Man
5. You Must Leave Us
6. Solomon Attacked
7. Solomon's Brother
8. Moving On
9. Witch Burning Aftermath
10. Kid Witch Tale
11. Village Pillage
12. Flashback Dream
13. Making Camp
14. Making Camp (Alt)
15. Bad Guys Attack Family
16. Master Fight
17. Get Her Back
18. Cloak And Dagger
19. Search For Meredith
20. Seeking Refuge
21. Meredith Escapes
22. Evil Is Already Here
23. Flesh Eaters Attack Solomon
24. Stooges
25. She's Dead!, She's Not!, Well...
26. Crucifixion (Part 1)
27. Crucifixion (Part 2)
28. Healed
29. Castle Approach
30. Father's Story
31. Single Blow (Part 1)
32. Single Blow (Part 2)
33. Malachi
34. Meredith

== Reception ==
=== Critical response ===
Review aggregator Rotten Tomatoes gives the film a rating of 67% based on reviews from 46 critics, with an average rating of 6 out of 10. The consensus reads: "Solomon Kane's formulaic and bleak narrative is overcome by an entertaining, straightforward adherence to its genre, exciting gore, and a gratifying lead performance by James Purefoy." Metacritic gives the film a weighted average score of 48 out of 100 based on reviews from 15 critics, indicating "mixed or average reviews".

Empire rated the film at 3 out of 5 stars, complimenting writer-director M. J. Bassett as handling the film "with the same level of commitment Peter Jackson brought to the Lord of the Rings trilogy, the darker moments of which are an obvious influence on Bassett's film". The review says of the film as a whole: "For less than the effects budget of this year's other sword 'n' sorcery adventures, Percy Jackson and Clash of the Titans, Bassett has delivered a dark-as-balls Highlander for the 21st century, played with such conviction it's hard not to be swept along". Total Film also rated the film at 3/5 stars with the conclusion: "A brutal fusion of angst and action, this mini-epic gives the sword-and-sorcery genre a bleak, brusque new life. Watch it for some terrific limbchopping and a mighty turn by James Purefoy". Sister magazine SFX rated the film at 4/5 stars. The review describes the location work as one of the films "great strengths", comparing the film to Witchfinder General and The Blood on Satan's Claw, "a landscape alive with the sense of supernatural forces gathering beneath the frost and the empty fields". Purefoy is also acclaimed, with "a sense of huge faultiness coiling within him [which] makes for a genuinely intriguing hero". He does note though that “it’s a shame that the film stumbles at the very end...[with what] looks...like a Satanic Transformer. [A] clashingly mainstream...’boss level’[-esqe] climax that bedevils every superhero movie these days, puncturing the movie’s careful atmosphere of pre-Enlightenment dread.“

Variety gave the film a negative review, stating that the film "just isn't much fun". Bassett's direction is described as being handled "confidently if without much flair" while Purefoy "gamely endures heavy exertion throughout; it's not his fault the script lends his character might and a mission but little personality". Phelim O'Neill at The Guardian also gave the film 3/5 stars. Its conclusion was mixed, stating: "There's plenty that's good here: a serious tone, steady pacing, muddy and bloody scenery and a convincing turn by Purefoy in his own west country accent. But Kane is an ill fit into the origins tale template; it's a story with few surprises". Time Out awarded the film with 4/5 stars, giving a positive review which praised the originality of the story and sharp 17th-century setting.

=== Awards ===
The film won the Audience Jury Award at the 2010 Fantasporto Film Festival. In 2014, the film was nominated for a Saturn Award for Best DVD/Blu-ray Release.

=== Planned sequels ===
James Purefoy, and various Hollywood media outlets, have gone on record as saying that M. J. Bassett promised Solomon Kane was intended as a trilogy with the first movie serving to "propel Solomon on into sequels" to further establish Purefoy's celebrity. The first movie was to bring Kane into a "fully formed" character so that his backstory didn't need to be repeated. However, due to the film's box office performance, no sequels were made.
