= Emily Corrie =

British former sailor and actress (born 1978)

- Born: 1978 (age 47–48)
- Education: LAMDA
- Occupations: Actress (1999–2007), Sailor (2009–2015)
- Years active: 1999–2007
- Known for: Portraying Suzanne 'Sooz' Lee, who was also the inspiration for the McFly song "5 Colours in Her Hair".
- Television: As If – UK version As If – US version

Emily Corrie (born 1978) is a British former sailor and actress. She is known in the United Kingdom for playing the character Suzanne 'Sooz' Lee in the Channel 4 drama As If and latterly in the American version of the same show.

== Early life and education ==
The daughter of Tim Corrie, founder of United Agents and former Chairman of BAFTA, Emily Corrie was brought up in Chorleywood, Hertfordshire. After studying at the London Academy of Music and Dramatic Art, Corrie won her first screen role in 1999, playing Ray Winstone's daughter in the TV series Births, Marriages and Deaths.

== Acting roles ==
She was the only actress from the British series of As If to star in the American version, moving to Los Angeles. McFly's debut number one single "5 Colours in Her Hair" was a homage to her character 'Sooz'.

Corrie also starred in the drama series NY-LON. In 2007 she had cameo roles in BBC One shows Casualty and Doctors.

In 2006, Emily played the role of WPC Harmison in the Touch of Frost episode entitled Endangered Species.

== Royal Navy enlistment ==
Engaged to a Royal Navy sailor and a keen diver, in 2009 Corrie enlisted in the Royal Navy after becoming disillusioned with life as an actress. She completed her basic training at HMS Raleigh in Cornwall, where her passing out ceremony was held in October, 2009. Starting in October, 2009, she undertook another 10 months of training at both HMS Collingwood in Fareham, Hampshire and HMS Raleigh.
