= As If (British TV series) =

- Genre: Comedy drama
- Starring: Paul Chequer; Emily Corrie; Jemima Rooper; Orlando Wells; Caroline Chikezie; Ben Waters
- Country of origin: United Kingdom
- Original language: English
- No. of series: 4
- No. of episodes: 76

Production
- Running time: 22 minutes
- Production companies: Carnival Films; Columbia TriStar International Television; Sony Pictures Television International

Original release
- Network: E4; Channel 4
- Release: 22 January 2001 – 31 July 2004

Related
- As If (American TV series)

As If is a British comedy-drama programme broadcast on E4 and later on Channel 4. There were 76 episodes across four series, the first broadcast on 22 January 2001 and the last on 31 July 2004.

== Premise ==
The series focused on six young adults who lived in London. Each episode was presented from a different character's point of view, which up to that point in time had never been done before in a comedy-drama television programme. As If was one of the flagship launch programmes of E4, the new pay entertainment channel from Channel 4. The programme's success saw it move to the main channel. The programme had a cult following and received critical acclaim. It was considered groundbreaking and was compared to another British serial drama Hollyoaks.

Part of the programme's identity was the style, such as surreal fly-on-the-wall style camera work, fast camera transitions, wacky sound effects added to some scenes and the distinctive theme music (the tune "Would you...?" by the band Touch and Go). Episode four of the first series was awarded an RTS Television Award for Best Tape or Film Editing - Drama.

Several notable episodes were centred around parodies of other films or TV shows, including The Blair Witch Project (episode 1x16); Moulin Rouge! (2x20); The Italian Job (3x12) and 24 (4x04).

In the beginning, the gang was divided in two. We learn Sooz, Jamie and Alex are good friends. Jamie has a crush on Nikki, who he sees as a nice, innocent, delicate girl. Nikki was friends with Sasha, who was in a relationship with Rob. When Jamie invited Nikki to a fake party, the destinies of these six persons crossed and friendships were born. While Rob, Jamie and Alex became good friends, Nikki and Sasha didn't get along with Sooz, although the three had their moments together.

== Characters ==
=== Main ===
- Jamie Collier (Paul Chequer)

The loveable joker of the group is a well-meaning pleasant guy, but has a tendency to get himself into trouble due to his rather naive attitude. He has an optimistic outlook and is content to play the role of the group's clown. Despite the foolish mistakes he sometimes makes, he is well liked by the group as his heart seems to be in the right place.
During the first series, Jamie enjoys the freedom of single life: he dates an older, married woman he met over the internet; idealizes Nikki, courts her and fails miserably; and eventually ends up kissing Sooz in the last episode. The second series follows the Jamie-Sooz relationship turmoil: from the problematic beginning, to the outing and eventual ending of the relationship by Sooz. Jamie ends up with Nikki for a one-night stand. The third series follows Jamie's undying love and sacrifice for Sooz, his coping with her coma, and eventually the distance torn between them due to her suicide attempt. The fourth series focuses primarily on Jamie's academic career or the lack of such: he fakes his leaving to Inverness; attempts to retake the qualifying tests and eventually is accepted to study psychology. Sooz and Jamie are together throughout most of the fourth series, but end up breaking up after Sooz is unfaithful.

- Suzanne 'Sooz' Lee (Emily Corrie)

A sarcastic punk who tends to be blunt and is something of a loner. She is rebellious, and does not follow social conventions, preferring to live by her own rules.
Sooz has a brief crush on Rob, which starts when he is in a break up with Sasha. When they get back together, Sooz has to get over it.
Sooz has to deal with ongoing mental health problems. She favours punk rock style clothing, has a number of tattoos and facial piercings, and is known for her trademark multicoloured dreadlocks. She is a talented artist. She has a tough exterior but inside is very insecure.
Sooz's dreadlocks inspired the 2004 McFly hit "Five Colours In Her Hair".

- Nikki Sutton (Jemima Rooper)

A girl who initially considered a "slut" in that she slept around and stole other people's boyfriends. Nikki is a man-eater and spoiled, but inside is a nice girl and a good friend. She suffered a lot after her father was sent to prison and because her mother didn't pay her enough attention. The last episode of the series was from Nikki's point of view, in which she chose between staying with Rob or going on an around the world trip, a present her mother gave her.

- Alexander "Alex" Stanton (Orlando Wells)

A gay character who is a fan of Star Wars, Dead Poets Society and football, hates Hollywood musicals and modern art, and prefers sex to shopping. Alex is in several relationships during the series, including police officer Dan, and Mark. When he serves as auxiliary teacher at a school, he meets one of the students, Allen (who calls himself "Little Al" after Alex, who is also known as Al). Allen forces him into a relationship; after feeling threatened at first, Alex put things clear to Allen. Alex then tries to insert Allen to the gay world, and they become friends. In the last episode, Alex realizes he wants to be with Allen, but Allen rejects him.

- Sasha Williams (Caroline Chikezie)

The "bitch" of the group. She is classy and loves fashion. She does not suffer fools gladly, and is often derided for shallowness. In the first seasons, Sasha is romantically involved with Rob, but they eventually break up after Sasha is unfaithful. She later tries to get Rob back, but without success.

- Robert "Rob" Conway (Benjamin Waters)

Rob is someone who cares a lot for the others and always seems sensitive to their problems. Sooz has a crush on him in the first season, but because Rob is with Sasha, Sooz knows that she and Rob will never be a couple. After Rob finds out Sasha was cheating on him, he starts a new relationship with Nikki. In the last episode, they go their separate ways, with Nikki having to decide between him and a trip around the world. He receives a few letters Nikki had sent way before leaving, and he realizes she went to Spain. He finds her, telling her he came for her.

=== Recurring characters ===
- Louise (Jaki Walker): a friend of Nikki and, later, the whole gang, although they all found her annoying and try to avoid her most of the time. Nikki hung out with her every time Sasha neglected her for Rob. Louise was always looking for a lost cause to fight for, and the gang made fun of her for it.
- Chris (Freddie Annobil-Dodoo): Sasha's boyfriend in between Rob, who was with her just for sex. Alex once told the group Chris was gay because he saw him hugging another man in a bathroom, but it was a misunderstanding. Nikki later tried a move on Chris, just to be used for sex and dumped afterwards.
- Gaby (Anna Wilson-Jones): a married woman who Jamie met on the internet. She was mother to a little boy (Jackson). Gaby and Jamie spent a night together and Gaby broke up with him the next day. After a while, Jamie thought Gaby was carrying his baby, but it was really Philip's (Gaby's husband).
- Dan Parker (Adam Sinclair): a gay cop Alex met in a club and lied to about his age. When Dan learnt the truth, he broke up with Alex, although they eventually got to be friends. Dan always worried about Alex and his well-being.
- Gary (Gerard Monaco): Louise's boyfriend who cheated on her with Nikki. It is not known if Louise ever knew about this or they just broke up, as Gary just stopped appearing in the show, but Louise seemed to stay friends with Nikki and the gang.
- Anna (Georgina Rylance): a woman Jamie meets in a club.
- Riggs (Ray Fearon): a musical producer who Nikki was interested in, but he hit on Sasha instead, which caused Nikki to get jealous and have constant arguments with Sasha. Sasha first rejected Riggs, although he invited her to work with him. Finally, she cheated on Rob with him. After that, Sasha and Rob broke up for good. The relationship didn't work.
- Mark Wilde (Callum Blue): Alex's bisexual boyfriend. Alex learned Mark was previously married, and broke up with him for lying about his bisexuality; they later got back together just to break up again. After that, Mark went into a relationship with Nikki.
- Christian (Matthew Chambers): an estate agent Nikki dates to get a flat for her and Sasha. While Nikki thought she was using Christian to her advantage, the truth is he was using her as well.
- Tyler (O. T. Fagbenle): an Art student with whom Sooz cheated on Jamie.
- Amber (Angel Coulby): Rob's fiancee. They didn't get married because Rob broke up with her before the wedding after realising his feelings for Nikki.
- Allen Rissbrook (James Kristian): also known as "Little Al", Allen is a gay student that approached Alex and threatened him into a relationship. Later, Alex set things clear and became friends with Allen, trying to introduce him to the gay world. When Alex finally realised his feelings towards Allen and tried to be with him, Allen rejected him.
- Katie (Jemima Abey): a student friend of Allen who fell in love with Jamie. She was the one who told Jamie about Sooz cheating on him with Tyler.
- Darna (Jessica Gerger): Sasha's co-worker at a fashion boutique.
- Paul Sutton (Jesse Birdsall): Nikki's father who went to prison for tax evasion.

== Crew ==
- Directors: John Duthie, Nicholas Jacobs, Brian Grant, David Kerr, Barnaby Southcombe (2003)
- Writers: Amanda Coe, Tom Higgins, Jane English, Julian Jones, Leslie Stewart, Jess Walters, Patrick Wilde
- Producers: Sarah Baynes (2002), Nicki Gunning, Greg Boardman, Johnny Capps, Jonathan Collier, Brian Eastman, Brian Grant, Dean Hargrove, Dan Kaplow, Julian Murphy, Andi Peters

== Soundtrack ==
Apart from its well-known theme music, As If also used many popular songs in its 76 episodes. Trip hop music was used quite extensively, especially music by Massive Attack (and specifically songs from the album Mezzanine) and Archive.

=== Disc 1 ===
1. Melanie B – "Feels So Good"
2. Robbie Williams – "No Regrets"
3. Billie Piper – "Honey to the Bee"
4. Kylie Minogue – "Koocachoo"
5. Atomic Kitten – "Right Now"
6. Melanie C – "I Turn to You"
7. Fragma – "Toca's Miracle"
8. Shah – "Do U Wanna Get"
9. George Michael – "Fastlove"
10. Louise – "Beautiful Inside"
11. Beverley Knight – "A.W.O.L."
12. Madasun – "Don't You Worry"
13. Lou Bega – "Mambo No. 5"
14. Touch & Go – "Would You...?"
15. Shanks & Bigfoot – "Sweet Like Chocolate"
16. En-Core feat. Stephen Emmanuel & Eska – "Coochy Coo"
17. Ramsey & Fen feat. Linsey Moore – "Love Bug"
18. Moloko – "Sing It Back" (Boris Musical Mix)
19. Ruff Driverz presents Arrola – "Dreaming"
20. ATB – "Killer" (2000)
21. Blur – "Tender

=== Disc 2 ===
1. Coldplay – "Trouble"
2. Tin Tin Out – "Anybody's Guess"
3. Toploader – "Dancing in the Moonlight"
4. The Supernaturals – "Smile"
5. Tom Jones & Stereophonics – "Mama Told Me Not to Come"
6. Supergrass – "Pumping On Your Stereo"
7. Embrace – "Save Me"
8. Doves – "Catch the Sun"
9. Space – "Female of the Species"
10. Republica – "Ready to Go"
11. Cornershop – "Brimful of Asha" (The Norman Cook Mix)
12. Fatboy Slim – "Praise You"
13. Groove Armada – "I See You Baby"
14. Underworld – "Push Upstairs"
15. Leftfield – "Phat Planet"
16. Fluke – "Absurd"
17. Amira – "My Desire" (Dreemhouse Remix)
18. Nightmares on Wax – "Jorge"
19. Beth Orton – "Central Reservation"
