= Andrew Novell =

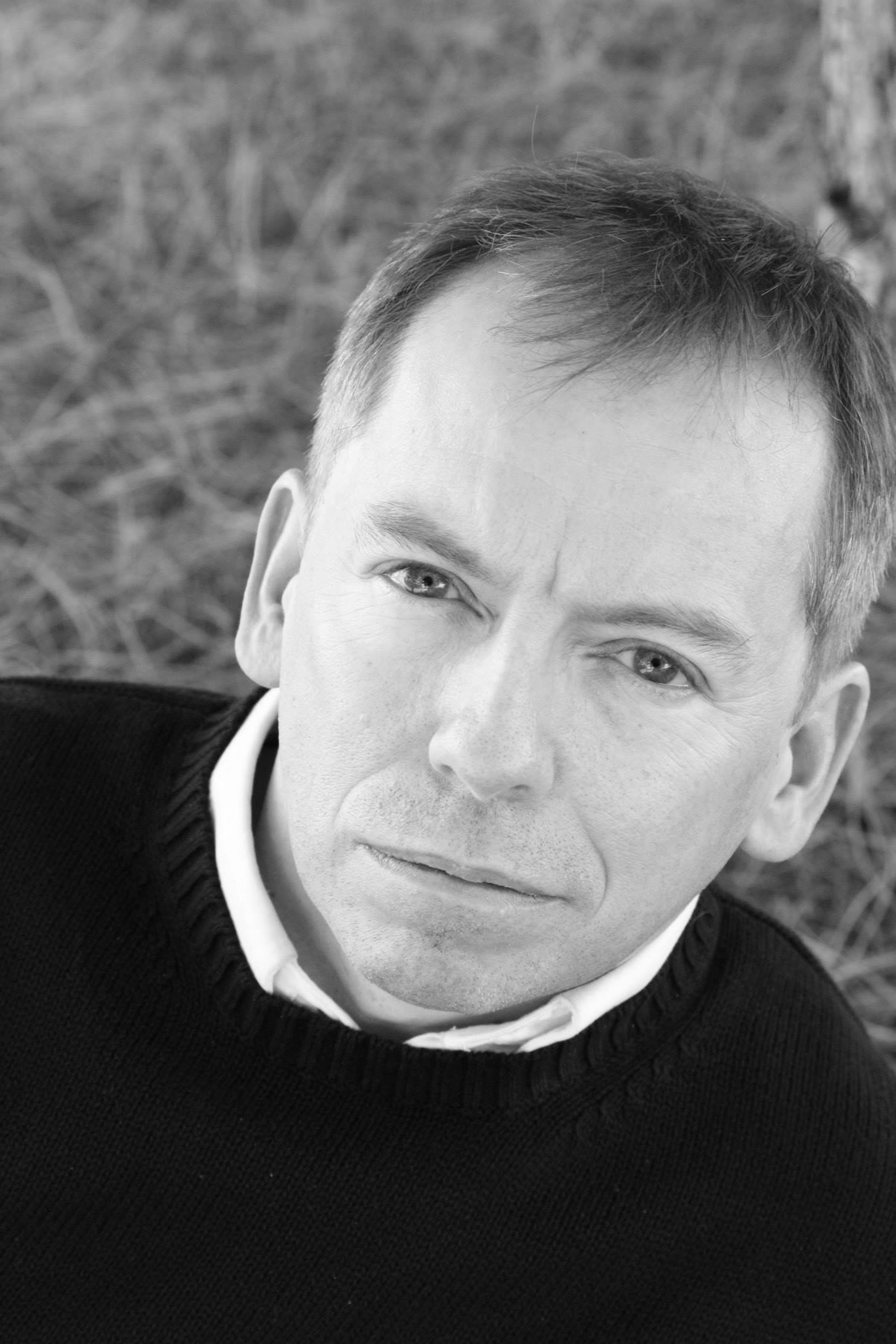
- Born: 2 August 1968 (age 57); Redhill, Surrey, England.
- Occupation: Actor
- Years active: 1992–present

Andrew Novell (born 1968) is an English/American actor, born in Redhill, Surrey, who has worked in theatre and film in both the UK and the USA.

A graduate of The Poor School (two-year acting course, 1995), he later attended Rose Bruford College (BA Directing, 2001) and the University of East Anglia (MA Directing, 2003).

He is notable for his portrayal of Richard III in the Merton Abbey Mills 1998 production of Shakespeare's Richard III, and as Ariel in The Cherub Company London's touring production of The Tempest (1995), which toured throughout the UK and Europe. His film credits include the horror film The Curiosity directed by Travis Beacham (Pacific Rim, Clash of the Titans), Paul Morris's film Siamese Cop (1996), The Creeping (2015), and in Reaper (2016), directed by Nicholas Galligan.

In his spare time he is also a writer. His work includes the plays Nell, Adelaide, and The Angel Being, and the science fiction novel The Glimmering Time. He has also written academically on theatre and acting, particularly on the work of Native American theatre and on Acting Registers.
