= As If (American TV series) =

- Cast
- Based on: As If
- Developed by: Jonathan Collier
- Starring: Tracie Thoms; Derek Hughes; Adrienne Wilkinson; Robin Dunne; Emily Corrie; Chris Engen
- Country of origin: United States
- Original language: English
- No. of seasons: 1
- No. of episodes: 7 (5 unaired)

Production
- Executive producers: Jonathan Collier; Brian Eastman; Julian Murphy
- Running time: 30 minutes (with commercials)
- Production companies: Carnival Films; Columbia TriStar Domestic Television

Original release
- Network: UPN
- Release: March 5 – March 12, 2002

Related
- As If (British TV series)

As If is an American sitcom that was adapted from the British television series of the same name which aired on UPN from March 5 to March 12, 2002. It served as a midseason replacement for Roswell and aired on Tuesdays on UPN after Buffy the Vampire Slayer. The cast included Emily Corrie, who portrayed Sooz in the original British version.

== Synopsis ==
The series focused on six friends in Los Angeles, with full episodes shot entirely from one perspective. Each episode presented different modern topics that applied to many teens of the day.

== Cancellation ==
The series was a part of the network's Tuesday evening 9 p.m. ET/PT timeslot, which outside of a couple exceptions, was terminally troubled due to The WB and Fox's much better ratings on the evening.

== Cast ==
- Tracie Thoms as Sasha
- Derek Hughes as Jamie
- Adrienne Wilkinson as Nikki
- Robin Dunne as Alex
- Emily Corrie as Sooz
- Chris Engen as Rob

== Episodes ==
No.	Title	Directed by	Original release date	Prod. code
1	"One"	Brian Grant	March 5, 2002	101
2	"Two"	Brian Grant	March 12, 2002	102
3	"Three"	N/A	Unaired	103
4	"Four"	N/A	Unaired	104
5	"Five"	N/A	Unaired	105
6	"Six"	N/A	Unaired	106
7	"Seven"	N/A	Unaired	107
