= A Lonely Place to Die =

2011 British film by Julian Gilbey

- Theatrical release poster
- Directed by: Julian Gilbey
- Written by: Will Gilbey; Julian Gilbey
- Produced by: Michael Loveday
- Starring: Melissa George; Ed Speleers; Sean Harris; Kate Magowan; Alec Newman; Stephen McCole; Gary Sweeney; Paul Anderson; Eamonn Walker; Karel Roden
- Cinematography: Ali Asad
- Edited by: Julian Gilbey
- Music by: Michael Richard Plowman
- Production companies: Carnaby Film Productions; Eigerwand Media; Molinare Studio; Genesis Film Sales
- Distributed by: Kaleidoscope Entertainment
- Release dates: 10 April 2011 (ActionFest); 29 August 2011 (FrightFest); 9 September 2011 (United Kingdom)
- Running time: 99 minutes
- Country: United Kingdom
- Language: English
- Budget: $4 million
- Box office: $442,550

A Lonely Place to Die is a 2011 British horror thriller film directed by Julian Gilbey, based on a screenplay from Julian and Will Gilbey, and starring Melissa George, Ed Speleers, Karel Roden, Eamonn Walker, Sean Harris, and Kate Magowan. The film follows a group of mountaineers who are pursued by criminals after discovering a kidnapped girl in the Scottish Highlands.

The film had its world premiere at the 2011 ActionFest in North Carolina, United States, where it won the awards for Best Director and Best Film. It received several other accolades, with director Gilbey winning the Silver Hugo Award at the Chicago International Film Festival, and earning awards at the Toronto After Dark Film Festival for Best Cinematography, Most Thrilling Film, and Best Action Film.

In August 2011, the film had its British premiere at the London FrightFest before being theatrically released in the United Kingdom on 9 September 2011. It received mostly favorable reviews from film critics, earning praise for its performances, cinematography, and suspense.

== Plot ==
Mountaineers Alison, Ed and Rob meet up with friends Jenny and Alex for a climbing and hiking trip in the Scottish Highlands. Whilst taking a break for lunch, they discover Anna, a young girl buried alive in a small chamber in the wilderness. They are unable to communicate with her as she speaks no English, with Ed guessing she might be Croatian. Deciding they need to get her to safety, Alison and Rob elect to take a shortcut to the nearest village to fetch help, but the route involves having to abseil down a high cliff named "Devils Drop". During their descent, Rob's rope apparently breaks, causing him to fall to his death. Alison is pelted with falling debris as she tumultuously reaches the bottom, whereupon she discovers Rob's rope was cut. Seeing a figure move away from the top of the cliff, it becomes clear the people who imprisoned Anna are trying to kill them.

After killing Rob and the unsuccessful attempt on Alison, Anna's kidnappers Mr. Kidd and Mr. Mcrae murder two nearby poachers and take their rifles, using them to open fire as Alison regroups with the others. During the attack Jenny is shot and killed, and Anna almost drowns after being pulled into river rapids, where she is eventually rescued by Alison. Alex distracts the two men by running in the opposite direction, holding a backpack wrapped in blankets that they mistake for Anna. Deciding to "follow the money", the two men give chase and gun him down, allowing Alison, Anna and Ed to escape the wilderness and reach the nearby town of Annan Mor. Meanwhile, Serbian mobster Darko, accompanied by British mercenaries Andy and Chris, travels to the area to negotiate a ransom exchange with Mr. Kidd and Mr. Mcrae on behalf of his employer.

Having been unable to recapture Anna, Mr. Kidd attempts to bluff his way through the negotiation with Darko, recalling a previous kidnapping when he murdered a young boy in Paris when his parents tried to avoid paying. Before Alison, Ed and Anna can be transported to Inverness by the police, they are tracked down by Mcrae, who kills the officers before pursuing them through the town, which is in the middle of hosting its Beltane festival. As the surviving mountaineers flee, Chris shoots Ed when he mistakes him for one of the kidnappers and is in turn shot by Mr. Mcrae, but manages to inform Darko that the kidnappers no longer have Anna before dying; this allows Darko to attack Mr. Kidd. After finishing off Ed, Mr. Mcrae chases Alison and Anna into a local house, which catches fire as he and Alison struggle. The fight eventually ends with Alison killing him by pushing him out of a window. She then manages to save Anna from the burning building before being rescued by firefighters. She is then transported to the hospital in an ambulance as Anna remains by her side.

Mr. Kidd nearly escapes with the ransom money, but is captured by Andy with the help of a tracking device and brought before Mr. Rakovic, a Serbian war criminal, who is Darko's boss and Anna's father. Rakovic has him stripped, tortured, and buried alive in the woods for the kidnapping. Andy is paid the full fee for his services plus the car, with Rakovic remarking that he is in his debt.

== Cast ==
- Melissa George as Alison, a mountaineer
- Ed Speleers as Ed, a mountaineer
- Alec Newman as Rob, a mountaineer
- Kate Magowan as Jenny, a mountaineer
- Garry Sweeney as Alex, a mountaineer
- Holly Boyd as Anna Rakovic, Rakovic's daughter
- Sean Harris as Mr. Kidd, one of Anna's kidnappers
- Stephen McCole as Mr. Mcrae, another of Anna's kidnappers
- Karel Roden as Darko, an associate of Mr. Rakovic
- Eamonn Walker as Andy, a mercenary hired by Rakovic
- Paul Anderson as Chris, another mercenary hired by Rakovic
- Matthew Zajac as Mr. Rakovic, a Serbian war criminal and Anna's father
- Leigh Newby, Carnival Reveller

== Production ==
=== Development ===
The film's screenplay, "The Long Weekend," was co-written by director Julian Gilbey, along with his brother, Will. The film was produced by Carnaby International, the studio behind Doghouse.

=== Casting ===
Franka Potente was originally cast in the lead role as Alison but was later replaced by Melissa George. George's casting was announced in April 2010, while the film was under the working title The Grave at Angel's Peak.

=== Filming ===
Principal photography began in May 2010 in Scotland.

The film was shot at various locations in Scotland, including Glen Coe, Glen Etive, Strathconon, Dingwall and Corrieshalloch Gorge.

== Release ==
In April 2011, the film had its world premiere at the ActionFest film festival in Asheville, North Carolina, United States, where it earned awards for Best Film and Best Director.

After the Cannes film market in May 2011, Kaleidoscope Entertainment picked distribution rights to the film in the United Kingdom. The film had its United Kingdom premiere on 29 August 2011, where it was the closing film of the London FrightFest, before being released in British cinemas shortly thereafter on 9 September. It was released in North America on 11 November 2011, following a screening at the Toronto After Dark Film Festival on 24 October 2011, by IFC Films.

== Reception ==
=== Box office ===
A Lonely Place to Die grossed $442,550 in the United States and Canada.

=== Critical response ===
On Rotten Tomatoes, the film has an approval rating of 71% based on 31 reviews.

Michael Gingold of Fangoria praised the film, calling it "a must-see, in no small part because Gilbey and his co-screenwriter/brother William keep throwing new curveballs into the scenario, taking the movie well off the beaten path of the stalking-in-the-woods genre." Peter Bradshaw of The Guardian gave the film a three-star out of five-star review, noting: "I feared a flabby supernatural outcome—something like The Descent. But no: it keeps on the side of realism, and stays more or less plausible right to the end."

Shawn Levy of The Oregonian praised George and Harris's performances, as well as the film's blend of elements from horror and action film genres and its "breakneck pitch," summarizing: "The photography, pacing and narrative of the small film continually impress and engage. It's the very rare film—of any stripe or size—that actually involves you more deeply as it goes along." Time Out's Nigel Floyd similarly commended the film's "relentless momentum" and Ali Asad's cinematography, awarding it a three out of five star-rating.

=== Accolades ===
Award/association	Year	Category	Recipient(s) and nominee(s)	Result	Ref.
ActionFest	2011	Best Film		Won	
ActionFest	2011	Best Director	Julian Gilbey	Won	
Chicago International Film Festival	2011	Silver Hugo Award	Julian Gilbey	Won	
Fangoria Chainsaw Award	2013	Best Limited Release Film		Nominated	
Fantastic Fest	2011	Best Actor – Feature	Sean Harris	Won	
Toronto After Dark Film Festival	2011	Best Action Film	Julian Gilbey	Won	
Toronto After Dark Film Festival	2011	Most Thrilling Film	Julian Gilbey	Won	
Toronto After Dark Film Festival	2011	Best Cinematography	Ali Asad	Won	
