= Daniel Percival =

English actor

- Born: December 1979; Leeds, England
- Died: 16 October 2024 (aged 44)

Daniel Percival (1979–2024) was an English actor and businessman.

== Early life and education ==
Percival was born in Leeds, Yorkshire, England. He attended the University of Leeds, before moving to study at RADA from 2002 to 2005, where he obtained an Acting RADA diploma and a BASSC Certificate in stage combat (RADA Best Armed Fight).

Percival retired from acting and opened Yogacentric, a yoga studio in Crouch End, London in 2013, with a second venue, 3Tribes, opening in 2016. In August 2024, 3Tribes expanded and began offering retreats in Goa, India.

Percival died unexpectedly of heart failure on 16 October 2024, with his funeral taking place on 31 October.

== Filmography ==
- Against the Dark (formerly known as Last Night) (2008) - Dylan
- Lost in Austen (2008) (TV series) - Michael Dolan
- Exodus (2007) - Moses
- Van Wilder: The Rise of Taj (2006) - Pipp Everett, the Earl of Grey
- Sinchronicity (2006) (TV series) - Jase
- Vital Signs (2006) (TV series) - Will Massey
- The Golden Hour (2005) (TV series) - Ben

== Stage performance ==
- Cymbeline (Arviragus), directed by Declan Donnellan (Cheek by Jowl World Tour)
- Hitting Town - Ralph, a play by Stephen Poliakoff, directed by Gemma Kerr (Southwark Playhouse, London, March 2006)
- Never the Sinner - Court Clerk (Arts Theatre)
- Othello - Iago (Leeds University)
- Marat Sade - Marquis de Sade (Leeds University)
- The Ragged Child - The Teacher
- Macbeth at the RSC-Mentieth, and Macduff's understudy
- Merchant of Venice at the RSC- Lorenzo

== Performances at the Royal Academy of Dramatic Art ==
Title - Played Character (Director)

- Don Juan Comes To War - Don Juan (Gadi Roll)
- The Days of Commune - Delegate Delescluze, Theirs, Commissionaire (Nicholas Barter)
- The Rivals - Captain Absolute (Bardy Thomas)
- The Knight of the Burning Pestle - Merrythought (Nick Hutchison)
- The Government Inspector - Petr Bobchinsky (Rubasingham)
