= Burning Men =

- Directed by: Jeremy Wooding
- Written by: Jeremy Wooding; Neil Spencer
- Produced by: Jeremy Wooding; Fiona Graham; Michael Vine; Mark Melvin; Phil Redding; Martin Hawthorn; John Drage
- Starring: Edward Hayter; Aki Omoshaybi; Elinor Crawley; Katie Collins
- Cinematography: Jono Smith
- Edited by: Kant Pan
- Production company: Lightbulb Film Distribution Ltd
- Release date: 1 March 2019
- Running time: 95 minutes
- Country: United Kingdom
- Language: English

Burning Men is a 2019 film directed by Jeremy Wooding and written by both Neil Spencer and Wooding. It stars Edward Hayter as Ray, Aki Omoshaybi as Don, Elinor Crawley as Susie and Katie Collins as Gemma. The film was filmed in London, Norfolk and in the East Coast. It was inspired by vinyl record collecting.

== Plot ==
Young musicians Ray and Don travel together in a 1970 Volvo Amazon after leaving their apartment, they decide to try selling vinyl records, but Ray steals a satanic Black Metal record and leaves to go travel with Don. In a music venue, they meet Susie and Gemma, who decide to join them on their trip. Gemma leaves shortly afterward, and the three others continue their road trip. They are also stalked by dark forces during trip, caused by the stolen vinyl recording.

== Cast ==
- Edward Hayter as Ray
- Aki Omoshaybi as Don
- Elinor Crawley as Susie
- Katie Collins as Gemma
- David Victor Crossman as the Restaurant Diner
- Lauren Crossman as the Bartender
- James Daltry as Pilgrim Leader
- Paul Edward Davies as a musician
- Raffaello Degruttola as Tony
- Andrew Tiernan as Mad Dad
- Arybella Eddy as Tami – Mad Dad's Daughter
- Denise Welch as Julie
- Sarah Jane Potts as Belladonna
- Christopher Fulford as Lenny
- Jennifer Goudie as Emily
- Chris Martin Hill as Bailiff 1
- Stacie James as Kate
- Simone Lahbib as Eduarda
- Ramage Lard as Bailiff 2
- Alex Mills as Kirk
- Joseph Millson as Micky

== Production ==
=== Development ===
Wooding had the idea when he ran a record and CD stall in Camden Market. He stated, "I thought it would be nice to concoct a story set in this world" and has said that the Fens in Norfolk helped create a "dark eerie ambience". Lightbulb co-founders Peter Thompson and Matthew Kreuze said they were thrilled that they could be part of Burning Men. They wanted to be part of this feature since the beginning and said that Jeremy Wooding has a unique way of making films.

=== Filming ===
The location of the film, in particular the east coast of England, helped make the road movie as it is seen, by the director, as an "atmospheric" location. Jeremy Wooding stated "Some kids in Yarmouth thought it was fantastic the town was going to be in a film. The film was primarily intended for moviegoers in their 20s and it was important for Wooding to create the correct dialogue. The actors helped him so the film could be seen with a younger sensibility. The film was made into a person camera point of view, the actors have a forward-pointing camera mounted on a helmet so viewers see through the actor's eye's as if they were there themselves. One scene was shot at Circular Sound music shop on St Benedicts Street in Norwich as well as in Yarmouth.

== Release ==
The movie premiered in London. The trailer as well as the poster were released in January 2019. The film was released on 1 March 2019. Lightbulb gave it a limited theatrical run in February 2019, in collaboration with marketing and distribution agency Munro Films. The director Jeremy Wooding as well as Edward Hayter and Elinor Crawley appeared live on TV on London Live on September 28, 2019.
