= Eamonn Walker =

English actor (born 1962)

- Born: Eamonn Roderique Walker; 12 June 1962 (age 64); London, England
- Occupation: Actor
- Years active: 1983–present
- Spouse: Sandra Walker (?–present)
- Children: 3

Eamonn Roderique Walker (born 12 June 1962) is a British actor. On television, he began in the BBC sitcom In Sickness and in Health (1985–1987), the ITV crime dramas The Bill (1988–1989), Supply & Demand (1998), and the HBO series Oz (1997–2003), for which he won a CableACE Award.

He led the ITV television film Othello (2001) and had a further role in the Fox series Justice (2006–2007). Walker starred as Wallace Boden in the NBC drama Chicago Fire and its spinoffs from 2012 to 2024. His films include Young Soul Rebels (1991), Once in the Life (2000), Legacy (2010), and A Lonely Place to Die (2011).

== Early life and education ==
Walker was born in West London to a Grenadian father and a Trinidadian mother, in 1962. Brought up in Islington in North London, Walker lived in Trinidad for six months when he was nine years old. He attended Hungerford School in Islington and began studying social work at the Polytechnic of North London. He trained as a dancer and later joined the Explosive Dance Theatre Company in London, but an abscess on his calf muscle forced him to give up dancing. He also studied at the New York Film Academy in the United States.

== Career ==
=== Early career in UK ===
Walker made his professional acting debut in 1983 on stage in London playing an East End punk rocker in the musical Labelled with Love, based partly on the music of the pop band Squeeze. His first television appearance came in 1985 when he appeared in an episode on the second series of Dempsey and Makepeace, which aired on ITV on 19 October 1985. His next television appearance came the following year in an episode of the children's anthology series Dramarama, also on ITV. Also that year, he was cast in the role of Winston, a black, gay, council carer and a thorn in Alf Garnett's side, for series 1–3 of In Sickness and in Health on BBC1. In 1987 he appeared in an episode of Bulman on Granada TV and in 1988 an episode of the ninth series of Tales of the Unexpected. In 1988 he won the role of PC Malcolm Haynes in The Bill on ITV, a part he played from 1988 to 1989.

His first film role came in 1991, playing Carlton in Young Soul Rebels about the interaction between different youth cultural movements in late 1970s Britain. He also appeared in an episode of the detective series Bergerac on BBC1. In 1992 he appeared in episodes of Love Hurts and The Old Boy Network. Then in 1993 he appeared in two comedies on BBC, with the role of Colin in three episodes of Birds of a Feather and he also appeared in an episode of One Foot in the Grave. His second film came in 1994 playing Peters in Shopping. He followed this in 1995 with appearances in two more British sitcoms, on the BBC, The Detectives and Goodnight Sweetheart. He also appeared in the drama series The Governor.

=== 1997 to present – Hollywood and American television ===
He appeared as Jake Brown in the miniseries Supply & Demand in 1997.

The same year he won the major role of Kareem Saïd on the American television drama series Oz on HBO. The series was set in a fictional maximum-security prison, and the character Walker played was a new inmate who was a devout Muslim. Walker spent time at a mosque in Harlem doing research on the Nation of Islam and American Muslim culture, explaining "As an actor, my portrayal had to be real." He appeared in the first episode on 12 July 1997 and he continued to play the role until the third episode of the final season in 2003. He won the award for Best Actor in a Dramatic Series in the inaugural CableACE Awards for his performance in the first series of Oz in the ceremony held in Los Angeles. Then in 1999 he received a Satellite Awards nomination for Best Actor in a TV Drama Series for his performances in Oz.

In 2000, Walker appeared in two films: the crime drama Once in the Life, acting alongside and being directed by Laurence Fishburne on his directorial debut; and the fantasy mystery Unbreakable, alongside Bruce Willis and Samuel L. Jackson. Walker also appeared in the de facto series finale of Homicide: Life on the Street, Homicide: The Movie. In 2001, he returned to British television starring as John Othello in a modern adaptation of the William Shakespeare play Othello on ITV, opposite Christopher Eccleston. For his role he won the Best male performance in television award at the first ever Black Film Makers (BMF) Film and Television Awards ceremony for the UK's leading black TV and film stars, which was held at the Grosvenor House Hotel in London in September 2002.

In 2003, he starred in the war film Tears of the Sun as Ellis "Zee" Pettigrew alongside Bruce Willis. Walker also appeared in an episode of the Fox Network drama series The Jury. The next year he made another return to British television in an episode of the crime drama Rose and Maloney.

Two more films followed in 2005, the crime thriller Lord of War with Nicolas Cage and the drama adventure film Duma. And from March 2005 he made his debut on Broadway, playing Mark Antony in Julius Caesar at the Belasco Theatre in midtown-Manhattan alongside Denzel Washington as Marcus Brutus.

In 2006, he played Dr Stephen Dakarai in three episodes of the medical drama series ER. He also starred in the Fox Network legal drama Justice, playing the part of Luther Graves.

In May 2007, he became the first black actor to play the role of Othello at either the original Globe Theatre or at the modern reconstruction, Shakespeare's Globe in London.

Then in 2008, he was in the second episode of the BBC drama series Bonekickers, playing Senator Joy, a United States Presidential candidate. He also starred in three films: the action drama Blood and Bone; the biographical music drama Cadillac Records, about the 1950s musical era, in which he plays the influential blues singer, guitarist and harmonica player Howlin' Wolf, which was released on 5 December 2008; and the romantic war drama The Messenger, in which Walker plays Colonel Stuart Dorsett. The first and the latter were released in 2009.

In October 2008, he performed on BBC Radio 4 in the first adaptation of Alice Walker's 1982 epistolary novel The Color Purple in the UK, serialised in ten parts.

Walker appeared on the NBC drama series Kings, which was based on the biblical story of David. He portrayed Reverend Ephram Samuels, an analogue of the biblical prophet Samuel. He also starred in the TV series The Whole Truth, alongside Maura Tierney and Rob Morrow, which premiered on 22 September 2010.

In 2011, Walker appeared on FX series Lights Out as Ed Romeo, former trainer of Lights Leary's last opponent, Death Row Reynolds. Walker appeared in an episode of BBC One's Inspector George Gently, playing the father of a murder victim in 2012, and in two episodes of the BBC/Cinemax series Strike Back. In 2013, he portrayed Frederick Douglass in the BBC series Copper. In 2020, Walker starred as the lead in Steppenwolf Theatre Company's production of Between Riverside and Crazy by Stephen Adly Guirgis.

After leaving Chicago Fire (where he was a lead) due to personal issues, Walker returned for a guest appearance the NBC series in episode 18 of season 13.

== Personal life ==
Walker lives in the United States with his wife Sandra. They have three children.

== Filmography ==
=== Film ===
Year	Title	Role	Notes
1991	Young Soul Rebels	Carlton	
1994	Shopping	Peters	
2000	Once in the Life	Tony	
2000	Unbreakable	Dr. Mathison	
2003	Tears of the Sun	Ellis 'Zee' Pettigrew	
2005	Duma	Ripkuna	
2005	Lord of War	Andre Baptiste Senior	
2008	Cadillac Records	Howlin' Wolf	
2009	The Messenger	Colonel Stuart Dorsett	
2009	Blood and Bone	James	
2010	The Company Men	Danny	
2010	Legacy	Darnell Gray Jr.	
2011	A Lonely Place to Die	Andy	

=== Television ===
Year	Title	Role	Notes
1985	Dempsey and Makepeace	Edwin Shore	Episode: "The Hit"
1985–1987	In Sickness and in Health	Winston ("Marigold")	Main cast
1986	Dramarama	P.C. Garfield Walcott	Episode: "Pig Ignorance"
1986	The Two of Us	Floyd	Episode: "Cracks in the Pavement"
1987	Bulman	DC Little Jimmy	Episode: "White Lies"
1988	Tales of the Unexpected	Bates	Episode: "Mr. Know-All"
1988–1989	The Bill	P.C. Haynes	Main cast
1991	Bergerac	Conrad	Episode: "Warriors"
1992	Love Hurts	Young Ghod	Episode: "Take It to the Limit"
1992	The Old Boy Network	Patrick	Episode: "A Question of Sport"
1993	Birds of a Feather	Colin	3 episodes
1993	One Foot in the Grave	Hugo	Episode: "One Foot in the Algarve"
1995	The Detectives	D.I. Tyler	Episode: "Flash"
1995	Goodnight Sweetheart	Thursfield	Episode: "Don't Get Around Much Any More"
1995–1996	The Governor	Snoopy Oswald	Main cast
1997–2003	Oz	Kareem Said	Main cast
1998	Supply & Demand	Jake Brown	4 episodes
2000	Homicide: The Movie	Eric Thomas James	TV Movie
2001	Othello	John Othello	TV Movie
2002	Whitewash: The Clarence Bradley Story	Jew Don Boney	TV Movie
2004	The Jury	Ted Truziak	Episode: "Last Rites"
2004	Rose and Maloney	George Parris	2 episodes
2006	ER	Dr. Stephen Dakarai	3 episodes
2006–2007	Justice	Luther Graves	Main cast
2008	Bonekickers	Senator Joy	Episode: "Warriors"
2009	Moses Jones	Solomon	Main cast
2009	Kings	Reverend Ephram Samuels	Main cast
2010	The Whole Truth	Terrence 'Edge' Edgecomb	Main cast
2011	Lights Out	Ed Romeo	2 episodes
2012	Strike Back	Walter Lutulu	2 episodes
2012	George Gently	Ambrose Kenny	Episode: "Gently Northern Soul"
2012–2024	Chicago Fire	Wallace Boden	Main role
2013	Copper	Frederick Douglass	Episode: "Aileen Aroon"
2014–2020	Chicago P.D.	Wallace Boden	Recurring guest role
2017–2019	Chicago Med	Wallace Boden	Recurring guest role

=== Theatre ===
Year	Title	Role	Notes
2005	Julius Caesar		
2007	Othello	Othello	
2020	Between Riverside and Crazy		
2025	Liberation	George Padmore	

=== Audio book ===
- World War Z (2006) - Paul Redeker

=== Interviews ===
- The Bill Podcast: Eamonn Walker Part 1 (2018)
