= Edward Hayter =

British actor and model

- Born: Edward Hayter; Muswell Hill, London, United Kingdom
- Education: The Poor School
- Occupations: Actor and model
- Years active: 2013–present
- Notable work: To Dream (2016); Will (2017); Touching the Void (2018)

Edward Hayter (born in Muswell Hill, London) is a British actor and model, best known for his leading performance in the independent film To Dream (2016), for which he received the World Music & Independent Film Festival Award for Best Actor in a Feature Film and was nominated for a British Urban Film Festival Award for Best Actor, both in 2017.

He is also known for his portrayals of Sir Thomas Walsingham in the television series Will (2017), and of mountaineer Simon Yates in the play Touching the Void (2018) at the Bristol Old Vic.

A graduate of The Poor School, he previously worked as a model for the Model 1 agency, and appeared in music videos for Catfish and the Bottlemen in 2014 and for Memtrix and Spor in 2015.

== Selected credits ==
=== Film ===
Year	Title	Role	Notes	Ref.
2014	An Open Letter To Dominic	Dominic	Short film	
2015	More Hate Than Fear	Graffiti artist	Short film	
2016	To Dream	Luke	World Music & Independent Film Festival Award for Best Actor in a Feature Film (2017); Nominated – British Urban Film Festival Award for Best Actor (2017)	
2018	Burning Men	Ray		

=== Television ===
Year	Title	Role	Network	Ref.
2017	Will	Sir Thomas Walsingham	TNT	

=== Theatre ===
Year	Title	Role	Venue	Ref.
2018	Touching the Void	Simon Yates	Bristol Old Vic	

=== Music videos ===
Year	Song	Artist	Ref.
2014	"Cocoon"	Catfish and the Bottlemen	
2015	"Darkest Hours"	Memtrix and Spor	

== Awards and nominations ==
Year	Award	Category	Work	Result	Ref.
2017	World Music & Independent Film Festival	Best Actor	To Dream	Won	
2017	British Urban Film Festival	Best Actor	To Dream	Nominated	
