= Madasun =

British girl group

- Origin: United Kingdom
- Genres: Pop, R&B
- Years active: 1997–2001
- Label: V2

Madasun was a three-piece British girl group, who had chart success in the UK and Australia in 2000, scoring three top 30 hits.

The group consisted of Vicky Barrett (born Victoria Barrett, 12 February 1976, Hertfordshire), Abby Norman (born Abigail Norman, 13 April 1977) and Vonda Barnes (born 20 January 1978, Hertfordshire). They got a demo deal with V2 Records and went to Sweden to record two songs on a trial basis. They went on to release three singles and one album on V2 Records. "Don't You Worry", the most successful of the three singles, reached number 14 in the UK and number six in Australia, also being certified platinum in Australia and reaching number 20 on the Australian year-end singles chart of 2000. The album The Way It Is failed to break into the top 75 of the UK Albums Chart (entering at number 153) and they were dropped due to poor sales, in January 2001, with the group subsequently breaking up.

== Discography ==
=== Albums ===
List of albums, with selected chart positions
Title	Details	Peak chart positions
Title	Details	UK
The Way It Is	Released: 4 September 2000; Label: V2; Formats: CD, cassette	153

=== Singles ===
List of singles, with selected chart positions
Title	Year	Peak chart positions							Certifications	Album
Title	Year	UK	AUS	EU Airplay	EU Sales	IRE	ITA	NLD	Certifications	Album
"Don't You Worry"	2000	14	6	45	54	15	24	94	ARIA: Platinum	The Way It Is
"Walking on Water"	2000	14	83	–	53	–	–	–		The Way It Is
"Feel Good"	2000	29	45	–	–	23	–	–		The Way It Is
