= Julian Gilbey =

British film director, screenwriter, film editor, cinematographer and actor

- Born: United Kingdom
- Occupations: Film director; screenwriter; editor
- Relatives: Nigel Bruce (great-grandfather); Will Gilbey (brother)

Julian Gilbey (born 1978) is a British film director, screenwriter, film editor, cinematographer, producer and actor. He is known for his work on horror and gangster films. His directing work includes Rollin' With The Nines (2005), Rise of the Footsoldier (2007), A Lonely Place to Die (2010), Plastic (2013), ABCs of Death 2 (2014), and Summit Fever (2022).

== Biography ==
Gilbey began his movie career in the 2000s with the low-budget 2002 horror film Reckoning Day, as director, screenwriter, actor, cinematographer, editor, make-up artist and costume designer. In 2006 he wrote, directed and edited the crime drama Rollin' With The Nines. Gilbey wrote, directed and edited Rise of the Footsoldier in 2007. In 2009 he worked as editor on Jake West's comedy horror film Doghouse.

In 2011 he directed and edited survival thriller A Lonely Place to Die, co-written with his brother Will Gilbey.

In 2013 Gilbey directed the international thriller Plastic, that he co-wrote with Will Gilbey and Chris Howard. In 2014 he directed a short film segment for ABCs of Death 2.

In 2018 he directed the drama film Summit Fever starring Freddie Thorp and Emma Tachard-Mackey.

=== Personal life ===
His great-grandfather was Nigel Bruce.

== Filmography ==
- Reckoning Day (2000)
- Rollin' With The Nines (2005)
- Rise of the Footsoldier (2007)
- A Lonely Place to Die (2010)
- Plastic (2013) – Director/Editor/Writer
- ABCs of Death 2 (2014)
- Summit Fever (2022)
