= Michael Kay (songwriter) =

British Nigerian songwriter and producer

Michael "Kiladejo" Kay is a British Nigerian songwriter, Music Executive, and record producer. He is known also for his songwriting and development work with the girl group Choice, and the American singer Pink His songs were instrumental in signing her to Laface records.

Michael is partner with Mathew Knowles in Music World Entertainment Europe and Africa, and is the owner of the independent record label TRE, which has recorded and released records by Davido, Jim Jones, and Demola the Violinist.

Kay wrote and produced the song "Together as One" performed by Preeya Kalidas for the movie Bollywood Queen, starring Preeya Kalidas and James McAvoy.

Michael's song "Missing You", was released on SMP, Sony Music Publishing label, which was set up by Sony Music Entertainment for the sole purpose of releasing his record.

Michael is the first cousin of Oba Adesimbo Victor Kiladelo, Jilo III, the 44th Osemawe of Ondo Kingdom, and cousin to Nollywood actress, Omotola Jalade.
