= Will Gilbey =

British screenwriter (born 1979)

- Born: United Kingdom
- Occupation: Screenwriter
- Relatives: Nigel Bruce (great-grandfather); Julian Gilbey (brother)

William Gilbey (born 1979) is a British screenwriter.

Gilbey works frequently with his brother, film director Julian Gilbey, and is best known for such films as Reckoning Day, Rollin' With The Nines, Rise of the Footsoldier, Doghouse and A Lonely Place to Die.

In 2013 he co-wrote the international thriller Plastic with Julian Gilbey and Chris Howard.

== Personal life ==
His great-grandfather was British actor Nigel Bruce.

== Filmography ==
- Reckoning Day (2000)
- Rollin' With The Nines (2005)
- Rise of the Footsoldier (2007)
- A Lonely Place to Die (2010)
- Plastic (2013) – writer and editor
- Once Upon a Time in London (2017) – writer
- Jericho Ridge (TBA) – writer and director
