= Freddie Thorp =

British actor (born 1994)

- Born: Frederick Nicholas Thorp; 7 March 1994 (age 32); Kensington and Chelsea, London, England
- Education: University of Exeter
- Occupation: Actor
- Years active: 2010–present
- Notable work: Fate: The Winx Saga; Overdrive; To Dream; Summit Fever

Frederick Nicholas Thorp (born 7 March 1994) is a British actor. He starred in the action film Overdrive (2017), as well as the Netflix series Safe (2018) and Fate: The Winx Saga (2021–2022).

== Early life ==
Thorp was born in Kensington and Chelsea, London, to Nick Thorp from the band Curiosity Killed the Cat and Antonia Manley. He has an older sister, Ophelia.

Thorp attended Summer Fields School in Oxford and later Eton College with fellow actor Jonah Hauer-King. He spent the summer of 2013 in New York City taking classes with the Lee Strasberg Theatre and Film Institute. That autumn, he began his studies in psychology at the University of Exeter, where he participated in theatre through EUTCo.

== Career ==
In 2016, he played his first role, Tommy, in the film To Dream. In 2017, Thorp was nominated at the British Urban Film Festival as the best emerging male actor.

In 2017, he played Garrett Foster, a car thief, in Overdrive. The scenes were filmed in Marseille, France.

In 2021–22, he played Riven, in the television series of Fate: The Winx Saga. During the second season, Riven shows a more sensitive side, while in the first season he was more delinquent. Thorp stated that he liked playing the bad boy because he can act in a way that he may never do in real life. Thorp has said that the audience can relate to his character's bisexuality. The series was cancelled after two seasons.

In 2022, he played Michael, a mountaineer, who quits his job to go on a journey climbing mountains in the film Summit Fever. Thorp also had to climb real rock faces on the Eiger, Matterhorn and Mont Blanc mountains for the film.

== Filmography ==
=== Film ===
Year	Title	Role	Notes
2016	The Head Hunter	Terry Medina	
2016	To Dream	Tommy	
2017	Overdrive	Garrett Foster	
2022	Summit Fever	Michael	
2024	Strictly Confidential	James	

=== Television ===
Year	Title	Role	Notes
2015	Doctors	Stuart Willis	Episode: "Plus One"
2015	The Advocate	Tommy Reese	Television film
2018	A Discovery of Witches	Matthieu Beny	1 Episode
2018	Safe	Chris Chahal	Main role
2021–2022	Fate: The Winx Saga	Riven	Main role
2026	A Good Girl's Guide to Murder	Luke Eaton	2 Episodes

=== Stage ===
Year	Title	Role	Notes
2016	No Quarter	Arlo	Network Theatre, London
2025	Are We Doing This Right?	Boy	Riverside Studios, London

== Awards and nominations ==
Year	Award	Category	Work	Result	Ref.
2017	British Urban Film Festival	BUFF Male Emerging Talent	To Dream	Nominated	
