= List of British films of 2014 =

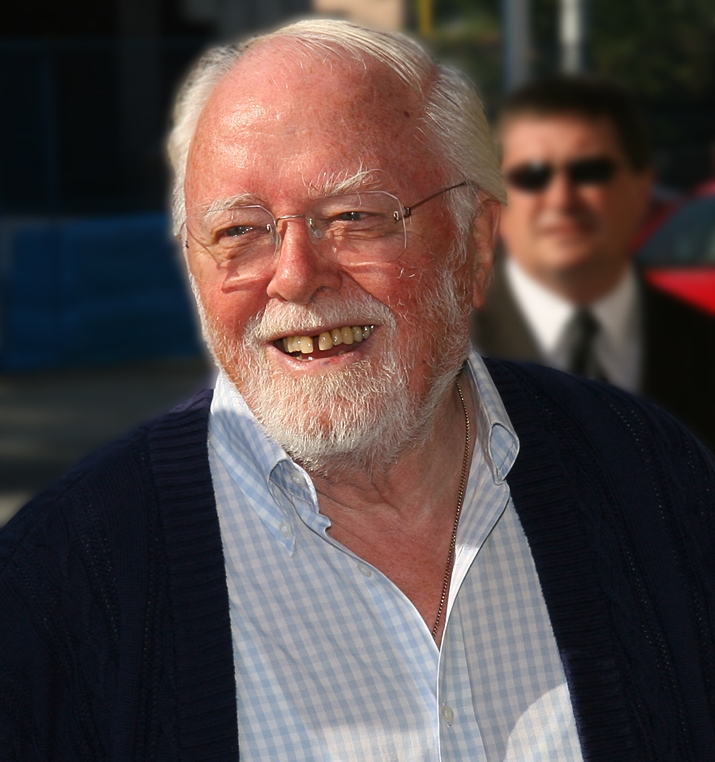
2014 saw the death of Richard Attenborough.

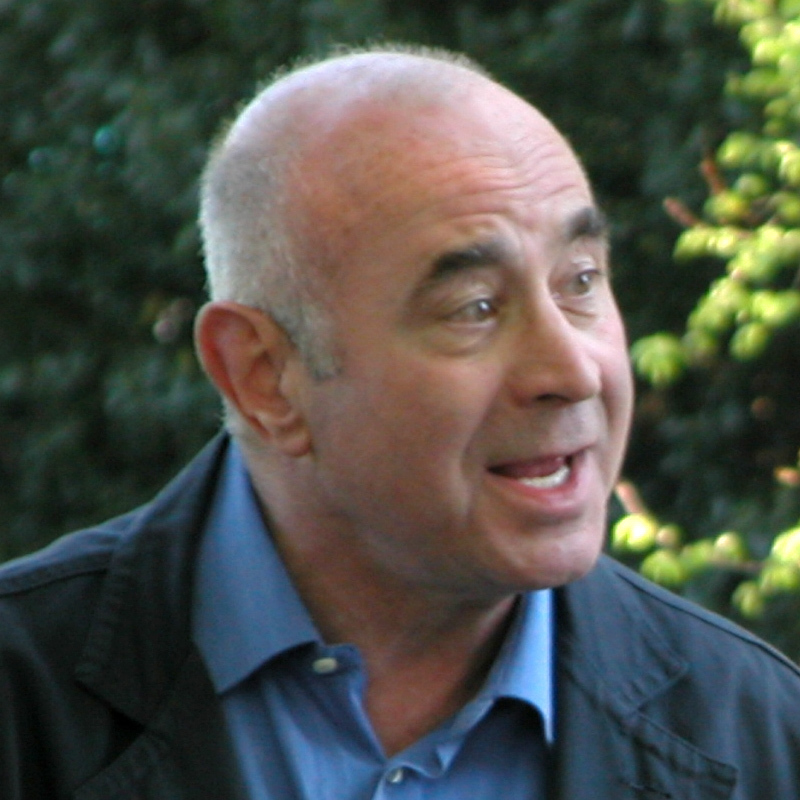
It also saw the death of Bob Hoskins.

The British film industry produced over six hundred feature films in 2014. This article fully lists all non-pornographic films, including short films, that had a release date in that year and which were at least partly made by the United Kingdom. It does not include films first released in previous years that had release dates in 2014.

Also included is an overview of the major events in British film, including film festivals and awards ceremonies, as well as lists of those films that have been particularly well received, both critically and financially. The year was particularly notable for a number of large-scale co-productions with the United States, such as Guardians of the Galaxy, Interstellar, Maleficent and X-Men: Days of Future Past.

== Major releases ==
=== January–March ===
Opening		Title	Cast and crew	Studio	Genre(s)	Ref.
J A N U A R Y	10	Redirected	Director: Emilis Vėlyvis; Cast: Vinnie Jones, Scot Williams, Gil Darnell, Oliver Jackson, Anthony Strachan	Koch Film	Crime; Action; Comedy	
J A N U A R Y	10	The Adventurer: The Curse of the Midas Box	Director: Jonathan Newman; Cast: Michael Sheen, Sam Neill, Lena Headey, Ioan Gruffudd, Keeley Hawes, Tristan Gemmill, Aneurin Barnard		Fantasy; Adventure	
J A N U A R Y	16	Lilting	Director: Hong Khaou; Cast: Ben Whishaw, Cheng Pei-pei, Andrew Leung, Morven Christie, Naomi Christie, Peter Bowles	Artificial Eye	Drama	
J A N U A R Y	17	Back in the Day	Director: Michael Rosenbaum; Cast: Morena Baccarin, Nick Swardson, Michael Rosenbaum	Screen Media Films	Comedy	
J A N U A R Y	17	Frank	Director: Lenny Abrahamson; Cast: Domhnall Gleeson, Maggie Gyllenhaal, Scoot McNairy, Michael Fassbender	Magnolia Pictures	Comedy; Drama	
J A N U A R Y	17	The Guest	Director: Adam Wingard; Cast: Dan Stevens, Maika Monroe, Leland Orser, Sheila Kelley, Brendan Meyer, Lance Reddick	Picturehouse	Thriller	
J A N U A R Y	18	Appropriate Behavior	Director: Desiree Akhavan; Cast: Desiree Akhavan, Rebecca Henderson, Scott Adsit, Halley Feiffer	Gravitas Ventures	Comedy	
J A N U A R Y	18	God Help the Girl	Director: Stuart Murdoch; Cast: Emily Browning, Olly Alexander, Hannah Murray, Pierre Boulanger	Amplify	Musical; Drama	
J A N U A R Y	19	A Most Wanted Man	Director: Anton Corbijn; Cast: Philip Seymour Hoffman, Rachel McAdams, Robin Wright, Willem Dafoe, Grigoriy Dobrygin	Entertainment One	Thriller	
J A N U A R Y	19	Calvary	Director: John Michael McDonagh; Cast: Brendan Gleeson, Chris O'Dowd, Kelly Reilly, Aidan Gillen, Dylan Moran, Isaach de Bankolé, M. Emmet Walsh, Marie-Josée Croze, Domhnall Gleeson	Fox Searchlight Pictures	Drama	
J A N U A R Y	19	Dead Snow: Red vs. Dead	Director: Tommy Wirkola; Cast: Vegar Hoel, Orjan Gamst, Martin Starr, Ingrid Haas, Jocelyn DeBoer, Stig Frode Henriksen, Kristoffer Joner	Well Go USA Entertainment (US)	Horror; Comedy	
J A N U A R Y	20	20,000 Days on Earth	Director: Iain Forsyth, Jane Pollard	Drafthouse Films	Documentary; Drama; Musical	
J A N U A R Y	20	The Trip to Italy	Director: Michael Winterbottom; Cast: Rob Brydon, Steve Coogan	IFC Films	Comedy; Drama	
J A N U A R Y	27	Non-Stop	Director: Jaume Collet-Serra; Cast: Joel Silver, Alex Heineman, Steve Richards, Andrew Rona	Universal Pictures	Mystery; Action; Thriller	
J A N U A R Y	31	Noble	Director: Stephen Bradley; Cast: Deirdre O'Kane, Sarah Greene, Brendan Coyle, Mark Huberman, Ruth Negga		Biography; Drama	
F E B R U A R Y	6	The Grand Budapest Hotel	Director: Wes Anderson; Cast: Ralph Fiennes, F. Murray Abraham, Mathieu Amalric, Adrien Brody, Willem Dafoe, Jeff Goldblum, Harvey Keitel, Jude Law, Bill Murray, Edward Norton, Saoirse Ronan, Jason Schwartzman, Léa Seydoux, Tilda Swinton, Tom Wilkinson, Owen Wilson, Tony Revolori	Fox Searchlight Pictures	Comedy	
F E B R U A R Y	7	'71	Director: Yann Demange; Cast: Jack O'Connell, Sean Harris, Paul Anderson, Charlie Murphy, David Wilmot, Paul Popplewell	StudioCanal UK	Drama; Thriller; Historical	
F E B R U A R Y	10	A Long Way Down	Director: Pascal Chaumeil; Cast: Toni Collette, Pierce Brosnan, Aaron Paul, Imogen Poots	Lionsgate	Comedy	
F E B R U A R Y	11	The Two Faces of January	Director: Hossein Amini; Cast: Viggo Mortensen, Kirsten Dunst, Oscar Isaac	Magnolia Pictures	Thriller	
F E B R U A R Y	14	Cuban Fury	Director: James Griffiths; Cast: Nick Frost, Rashida Jones, Olivia Colman, Chris O'Dowd, Wendi McLendon-Covey, Alexandra Roach	StudioCanal	Romance; Comedy	
F E B R U A R Y	16	Little Happiness	Director: Nihat Seven; Cast: Mehtap Anil		Drama	
M A R C H	10	Before I Disappear	Director: Shawn Christensen; Cast: Shawn Christensen, Fátima Ptacek, Emmy Rossum, Paul Wesley, Richard Schiff, Ron Perlman	IFC Films	Drama	
M A R C H	12	Need for Speed	Director: Scott Waugh; Cast: Aaron Paul, Dominic Cooper, Scott Mescudi, Imogen Poots, Ramón Rodríguez, Michael Keaton	Walt Disney Studios Motion Pictures	Action; Thriller	
M A R C H	14	Better Living Through Chemistry	Director: David Posamentier; Cast: Sam Rockwell, Olivia Wilde, Michelle Monaghan, Ben Schwartz, Ken Howard, Ray Liotta, Jane Fonda	Samuel Goldwyn Films	Comedy; Drama	
M A R C H	14	Ironclad: Battle for Blood	Director: Jonathan English; Cast: Roxanne McKee, Michelle Fairley, Danny Webb, Tom Austen	Content Media	Adventure	

=== April–June ===
Opening		Title	Cast and crew	Studio	Genre(s)	Ref.
A P R I L	4	In the Blood	Director: John Stockwell; Cast: Gina Carano, Cam Gigandet, Danny Trejo, Amaury Nolasco	Anchor Bay Films	Action	
A P R I L	5	The Ninth Cloud	Director: Jane Spencer; Cast: Michael Madsen, Jean-Hugues Anglade, Meredith Ostrom, Megan Maczko, Joshua Feinman, Wendy Thomas		Comedy; Drama	
A P R I L	10	The Quiet Ones	Director: John Pogue; Cast: Jared Harris, Sam Claflin, Olivia Cooke, Erin Richards	Lionsgate	Horror	
A P R I L	10	Transcendence	Director: Wally Pfister; Cast: Johnny Depp, Rebecca Hall, Paul Bettany, Kate Mara, Cillian Murphy, Cole Hauser, Morgan Freeman	Warner Bros. Pictures	Science fiction	
A P R I L	11	Deadly Virtues	Director: Ate de Jong; Cast: Edward Akrout, Matt Barber, Megan Maczko	A-Film Benelux MSD	Thriller; Horror	
A P R I L	17	Let Us Prey	Director: Brian O'Malley; Cast: Liam Cunningham, Pollyanna McIntosh, Bryan Larkin	Kaleidoscope Entertainment	Horror	
A P R I L	17	Virunga	Director: Orlando von Einsiedel	Netflix	Documentary	
A P R I L	18	The Canal	Director: Ivan Kavanagh; Cast: Antonia Campbell-Hughes, Rupert Evans, Steve Oram		Horror	
A P R I L	24	Beyond	Director: Joseph Baker, Tom Large; Cast: Richard J. Danum, Gillian MacGregor, Paul Brannigan	Kaleidoscope	Science fiction Drama	
A P R I L	26	27, Memory Lane	Director: Luke Hupton; Cast: James Clay, Michael Maughan, Dani Harrison, Edwina Lea, Hazel Mrozek, Diona Doherty, Mario Babic, Jane Leadbetter, Samantha Mesagno, Lucas Smith		Fantasy; Romance; Drama	
M A Y	2	Plastic	Director: Julian Gilbey; Cast: Ed Speleers, Alfie Allen, Will Poulter, Sebastian de Souza, Emma Rigby, Thomas Kretschmann	Paramount Pictures	Action; Comedy; Crime	
M A Y	10	X-Men: Days of Future Past	Director: Bryan Singer; Cast: Hugh Jackman, James McAvoy, Michael Fassbender, Jennifer Lawrence, Halle Berry, Anna Paquin, Elliot Page, Peter Dinklage, Ian McKellen, Patrick Stewart	20th Century Fox	Superhero	
M A Y	15	Mr. Turner	Director: Mike Leigh; Timothy Spall, Lesley Manville, Roger Ashton-Griffiths, Joshua McGuire, Dorothy Atkinson	Entertainment One	Drama; Biography	
M A Y	16	Catch Me Daddy	Director: Daniel Wolfe; Cast: Sameena Jabeen Ahmed, Gary Lewis, Conor McCarron		Thriller	
M A Y	17	The Salvation	Director: Kristian Levring; Cast: Mads Mikkelsen, Eva Green, Eric Cantona, Mikael Persbrandt, Jeffrey Dean Morgan, Jonathan Pryce, Michael Raymond-James	Nordisk Film	Western	
M A Y	21	Snow in Paradise	Director: Andrew Hulme; Cast: Frederick Schmidt, Martin Askew, David Spinx	Artificial Eye	Thriller	
M A Y	22	Jimmy's Hall	Director: Ken Loach; Cast: Barry Ward, Simone Kirby, Jim Norton	Entertainment One	Drama	
M A Y	23	Postman Pat: The Movie	Director: Mike Disa; Cast: Stephen Mangan, Jim Broadbent, Rupert Grint, David Tennant	Lions Gate Entertainment	Animated; Comedy	
M A Y	25	Chef	Director: Jon Favreau; Cast: Jon Favreau, Sofía Vergara, Emjay Anthony, John Leguizamo, Oliver Platt, Bobby Cannavale, Dustin Hoffman, Scarlett Johansson, Robert Downey Jr.	Lions Gate Entertainment	Comedy-drama; Comedy	
M A Y	26	Pride	Director: Matthew Warchus; Cast: Bill Nighy, Ben Schnetzer, Joseph Gilgun, Freddie Fox	BBC Films	Drama; Comedy	
M A Y	28	Maleficent	Director: Robert Stromberg; Cast: Angelina Jolie, Sharlto Copley, Elle Fanning, Sam Riley, Imelda Staunton, Juno Temple, Lesley Manville, Brenton Thwaites, Kenneth Cranham, Hannah New	Walt Disney Studios Motion Pictures	Fantasy	
M A Y	30	Downhill	Director: James Rouse; Cast: Richard Lumsden, Karl Theobald, Jeremy Swift, Ned Dennehy	Rambling Road Entertainment LTD	Comedy	
J U N E	1	Top Dog	Director: Martin Kemp; Cast: Leo Gregory, Ricci Harnett, Vincent Regan, George Russo	Universal Pictures	Drama; Crime	
J U N E	13	Tamanna	Director: Steven Moore; Cast: Mehreen Raheel, Omair Rana, Salman Shahid, Feryal Gauhar	Summit Entertainment	Drama; Crime	
J U N E	18	Hyena	Director: Gerard Johnson; Cast: Peter Ferdinando, Stephen Graham, MyAnna Buring, Elisa Lasowski, Neil Maskell, Richard Dormer, Tony Pitts, Mehmet Ferda		Thriller	
J U N E	19	The Anomaly	Director: Noel Clarke; Cast: Noel Clarke, Ian Somerhalder, Brian Cox, Alexis Knapp	Universal Pictures	Science fiction Action; Thriller	
J U N E	20	Hide and Seek	Director: Joanna Coates; Cast: Josh O'Connor, Hannah Arterton, Rea Mole, Daniel Metz		Drama; Romance	
J U N E	20	Secret Sharer	Director: Peter Fudakowski; Cast: Jack Laskey, Zhu Zhu	Premiere Releasing	Romance; Thriller	
J U N E	23	Set Fire to the Stars	Director: Andy Goddard; Cast: Elijah Wood, Celyn Jones, Kelly Reilly, Steven Mackintosh, Shirley Henderson, Kevin Eldon	Munro Film Services	Biography; Drama	
J U N E	24	The Guvnors	Director: Gabe Turner; Cast: Martin Hancock, Vas Blackwood, Harley Sylvester, David Essex, Doug Allen	Metrodome Distribution	Thriller	
J U N E	27	Mrs. Brown's Boys D'Movie	Director: Ben Kellett; Cast: Brendan O'Carroll, Jennifer Gibney, Danny O'Carroll, Eilish O'Carroll, Nick Nevern, Paddy Houlihan, Dermot O'Neill	Universal Pictures	Comedy	
J U N E	27	Walking on Sunshine	Director: Max Giwa; Cast: Annabel Scholey, Giulio Berruti, Leona Lewis, Katy Brand	Vertigo Films	Drama; Musical	

=== July–September ===
Opening		Title	Cast and crew	Studio	Genre(s)	Ref.
J U L Y	3	Desert Dancer	Director: Richard Raymond; Cast: Reece Ritchie, Freida Pinto, Nazanin Boniadi, Tom Cullen, Marama Corlett, Akin Gazi	Relativity Media	Biography; Drama	
J U L Y	11	Ramanujan	Director: Gnana Rajasekaran; Cast: Abhinay Vaddi, Abbas, Suhasini Maniratnam, Kevin McGowan, Bhama, Michael Lieber		Biography; Drama	
J U L Y	13	The Hooligan Factory	Director: Nick Nevern; Cast: Jason Maza, Nick Nevern, Tom Burke, Ray Fearon, Steven O'Donnell, Morgan Watkins, Josef Altin, Leo Gregory, Keith-Lee Castle	Universal Pictures	Comedy	
J U L Y	18	Pudsey: The Movie	Director: Nick Moore; Cast: David Walliams, John Sessions, Jessica Hynes, Izzy Meikle-Small, Malachy Knights	Vertigo Films	Comedy; Action	
J U L Y	21	Guardians of the Galaxy	Director: James Gunn; Cast: Chris Pratt, Zoe Saldaña, Dave Bautista, Vin Diesel, Bradley Cooper, Lee Pace, Michael Rooker, Karen Gillan, Djimon Hounsou, John C. Reilly, Glenn Close, Benicio del Toro	Walt Disney Studios Motion Pictures	Superhero; Comedy	
A U G U S T	1	Get on Up	Director: Tate Taylor; Cast: Chadwick Boseman, Nelsan Ellis, Dan Aykroyd, Viola Davis, Keith Robinson, Octavia Spencer	Universal Pictures	Drama; Biography	
A U G U S T	6	The Inbetweeners 2	Director: Damon Beesley, Iain Morris; Cast: Simon Bird, James Buckley, Blake Harrison, Joe Thomas	Film4 Productions	Comedy	
A U G U S T	12	Katherine of Alexandria	Director: Michael Redwood; Cast: Nicole Madjarov, Peter O'Toole, Steven Berkoff, Joss Ackland	Kaleidoscope	Biography; Historical; Drama	
A U G U S T	15	Hector and the Search for Happiness	Director: Peter Chelsom; Cast: Simon Pegg, Toni Collette, Rosamund Pike, Stellan Skarsgård, Jean Reno, Christopher Plummer	Koch Media	Comedy; Drama	
A U G U S T	16	Beneath a Neon Tide	Director: Simon P. Edwards; Cast: Tom Grace, Jessica Messenger, Mark Ivan Benfield, David Blood, Nicola Wright, Ian Quickfall, Mario Babic, Ann Marie Woodyatt, Emma Lock		Drama	
A U G U S T	22	The Forgotten	Director: Oliver Frampton; Cast: Clem Tibber, Shaun Dingwall, Elarica Gallacher		Horror	
A U G U S T	22	The Last Showing	Director: Phil Hawkins; Cast: Robert Englund, Finn Jones, Emily Berrington	Sony Pictures	Horror; Thriller	
A U G U S T	22	The Prince	Director: Brian A. Miller; Cast: Jason Patric, Bruce Willis, John Cusack, Rain, Jessica Lowndes, Johnathon Schaech, Gia Mantegna, 50 Cent	Lionsgate	Crime; Thriller	
A U G U S T	23	The Sleeping Room	Director: John Shackleton; Cast: Leila Mimmack, Joseph Beattie, Julie Graham, Christopher Adamson, David Sibley, Chris Waller	Movie Mogul Films	Horror	
A U G U S T	27	The November Man	Director: Roger Donaldson; Cast: Pierce Brosnan, Luke Bracey, Olga Kurylenko, Eliza Taylor, Caterina Scorsone, Bill Smitrovich, Will Patton, Mediha Musliović, Amila Terzimehic	Relativity Media	Thriller	
A U G U S T	29	The Imitation Game	Director: Morten Tyldum; Cast: Benedict Cumberbatch, Keira Knightley, Matthew Goode, Mark Strong, Charles Dance	Studiocanal	Historical; Biographical; Thriller	
S E P T E M B E R	4	Before I Go to Sleep	Director: Rowan Joffé; Cast: Nicole Kidman, Colin Firth, Mark Strong, Anne-Marie Duff, Dean-Charles Chapman	StudioCanal UK	Thriller	
S E P T E M B E R	4	The Dead Lands	Director: Toa Fraser; Cast: James Rolleston		Action	
S E P T E M B E R	4	Theeb	Director: Naji Abu Nowar; Cast: Jacir Eid Al-Hwietat	Film Movement	Drama	
S E P T E M B E R	5	Big Game	Director: Jalmari Helander; Cast: Samuel L. Jackson, Onni Tommila, Felicity Huffman, Victor Garber, Ted Levine, Jim Broadbent, Ray Stevenson	Entertainment One	Action; Adventure	
S E P T E M B E R	5	X+Y	Director: Morgan Matthews; Cast: Asa Butterfield, Rafe Spall, Sally Hawkins, Eddie Marsan, Jo Yang	Koch Media	Drama; Comedy; Romance	
S E P T E M B E R	6	Gemma Bovery	Director: Anne Fontaine; Cast: Gemma Arterton, Jason Flemyng, Mel Raido, Fabrice Luchini	Gaumont	Comedy; Drama	
S E P T E M B E R	6	Roger Waters: The Wall	Director: Roger Waters; Cast: Roger Waters		Musical	
S E P T E M B E R	6	The Duke of Burgundy	Director: Peter Strickland; Cast: Sidse Babett Knudsen, Chiara D'Anna	Artificial Eye	Drama	
S E P T E M B E R	6	The Face of an Angel	Director: Michael Winterbottom; Cast: Kate Beckinsale, Daniel Brühl, Cara Delevingne	Soda Pictures	Thriller	
S E P T E M B E R	7	Meet Me in Montenegro	Director: Alex Holdridge; Cast: Rupert Friend, Linnea Saasen, Jennifer Ulrich, Alex Holdridge	The Orchard	Romance; Comedy	
S E P T E M B E R	7	Miss Julie	Director: Liv Ullmann; Cast: Jessica Chastain, Colin Farrell, Samantha Morton	Columbia TriStar	Drama	
S E P T E M B E R	7	The Theory of Everything	Director: James Marsh; Cast: Eddie Redmayne, Felicity Jones	Universal Pictures	Drama; Romance; Biography; Historical	
S E P T E M B E R	8	The Mirror	Director: Edward Boase; Cast: Jemma Dallender, Joshua Dickinson, Nate Fallows		Horror	
S E P T E M B E R	9	Learning to Drive	Director: Isabel Coixet; Cast: Patricia Clarkson, Ben Kingsley, Jake Weber, Grace Gummer	Broad Green Pictures	Comedy	
S E P T E M B E R	10	An Bronntanas	Director: Tommy Collins; Cast: Michelle Beamish		Thriller	
S E P T E M B E R	10	My Old Lady	Director: Israel Horovitz; Cast: Maggie Smith, Kevin Kline, Kristin Scott Thomas, Dominique Pinon	Curzon Film World	Comedy; Drama	
S E P T E M B E R	10	One Night in Istanbul	Director: James Marquand; Cast: Steven Waddington, Paul Barber, Lucien Laviscount, Samantha Womack	Stray Dog Films	Comedy; Drama	
S E P T E M B E R	13	A Little Chaos	Director: Alan Rickman; Cast: Kate Winslet, Matthias Schoenaerts, Alan Rickman, Stanley Tucci	Lionsgate	Historical; Drama; Romance	
S E P T E M B E R	16	Devil's Tower	Director: Owen Tooth; Cast: Jason Mewes, Roxanne Pallett, Frances Ruffelle	Monster Pictures	Horror	
S E P T E M B E R	19	Outpost 37	Director: Jabbar Raisani; Cast: Adrian Paul, Reiley McClendon, Rick Ravanello	IFC Films	Science fiction Action; Thriller	
S E P T E M B E R	19	The Riot Club	Director: Lone Scherfig; Cast: Max Irons, Sam Claflin, Douglas Booth, Freddie Fox	Universal Pictures	Drama; Thriller	
S E P T E M B E R	23	White Settlers	Director: Simeon Halligan; Cast: Pollyanna McIntosh, Lee Williams, Joanne Mitchell	Falcon Films	Horror	
S E P T E M B E R	26	What We Did on Our Holiday	Director: Andy Hamilton, Guy Jenkin; Cast: David Tennant, Rosamund Pike, Billy Connolly	Lionsgate	Comedy; Drama	
S E P T E M B E R	28	Bonobo	Director: Matthew Hammett Knott; Cast: Tessa Peake-Jones, Josie Lawrence, James Norton, Eleanor Wyld		Comedy; Drama	

=== October–December ===
Opening		Title	Cast and crew	Studio	Genre(s)	Ref.
O C T O B E R	3	The Quiet Hour	Director: Stéphanie Joalland; Cast: Dakota Blue Richards, Karl Davies, Jack McMullen, Brigitte Millar		Science fiction	
O C T O B E R	5	Effie Gray	Director: Richard Laxton; Cast: Dakota Fanning, Emma Thompson, Greg Wise, Tom Sturridge	Metrodome Distribution	Historical; Drama; Biography	
O C T O B E R	9	Monsters: Dark Continent	Director: Tom Green; Cast: Johnny Harris, Sam Keeley, Joe Dempsie	Vertigo Films	Science fiction	
O C T O B E R	9	Trash	Director: Stephen Daldry; Cast: Rooney Mara, Martin Sheen, Wagner Moura, Selton Mello	Focus Features	Thriller; Drama; Adventure	
O C T O B E R	14	Candlestick	Director: Christopher Presswell; Cast: Andrew Fitch, Isla Ure, Nigel Thomas, Tom Knight	Indie Rights	Drama; Mystery	
O C T O B E R	14	Testament of Youth	Director: James Kent; Cast: Alicia Vikander, Kit Harington, Colin Morgan, Taron Egerton	Lionsgate	Drama; Historical	
O C T O B E R	15	Fury	Director: David Ayer; Cast: Brad Pitt, Shia LaBeouf, Logan Lerman, Michael Peña, Jon Bernthal, Jason Isaacs, Scott Eastwood	Columbia Pictures	War	
O C T O B E R	16	Son of a Gun	Director: Julius Avery; Ewan McGregor, Brenton Thwaites, Alicia Vikander, Jacek Koman, Matt Nable, Tom Budge	A24	Crime; Thriller	
O C T O B E R	17	Love, Rosie	Director: Christian Ditter; Cast: Lily Collins, Sam Claflin, Tamsin Egerton, Suki Waterhouse, Jaime Winstone	Lionsgate	Drama; Comedy; Romance	
O C T O B E R	17	Northern Soul	Director: Elaine Constantine; Cast: Elliot James Langridge, Antonia Thomas, Steve Coogan	Universal Pictures UK	Historical	
O C T O B E R	18	Robot Overlords	Director: Jon Wright; Cast: Callan McAuliffe, Ben Kingsley, Gillian Anderson, Milo Parker, Geraldine James	Signature Entertainment	Science fiction	
O C T O B E R	20	The Smoke	Director: Ben Pickering; Cast: Matt Di Angelo, Lili Bordán, Alan Ford, Stephen Marcus, Lindsay Armaou	Signature Entertainment	Crime Thriller	
O C T O B E R	20	Treehouse	Director: Michael Bartlett; Cast: J. Michael Trautmann, Dana Melanie, Daniel Fredrick, Clint James	Uncork'd Entertainment	Horror	
O C T O B E R	22	The Rendlesham UFO Incident	Director: Daniel Simpson; Cast: Danny Shayle, Abbie Salt, Robert Curtis	Newscope Films	Horror	
O C T O B E R	24	The Knife That Killed Me	Director: Kit Monkman; Cast: Jack McMullen, Reece Dinsdale, Haruka Abe, Andrew Dunn, Oliver Lee, Charles Mnene, Josh Brown, Thomas Teago, Rosie Goddard, Andrew Ellis, Alfie Stewart, Reece Douglas, Richard Crehan	Universal Pictures	Drama	
O C T O B E R	26	Interstellar	Director: Christopher Nolan; Cast: Matthew McConaughey, Anne Hathaway, Jessica Chastain, Bill Irwin, Ellen Burstyn, Michael Caine	Paramount Pictures	Epic; Science fiction	
N O V E M B E R	3	Allies	Director: Dominic Burns; Cast: Julian Ovenden, Chris Reilly, Matt Willis, Edmund Kingsley, Leon Vickers, Mark Moraghan, Paul Ridley, Frank Leboeuf, Steven Hartley	eOne (UK) (USA)	War	
N O V E M B E R	7	Bhopal: A Prayer for Rain	Director: Ravi Kumar; Cast: Martin Sheen, Mischa Barton, Kal Penn, Rajpal Yadav, Tannishtha Chatterjee, Fagun Thakrar, Vineet Kumar, Lisa Dwan	Revolver Entertainment	Drama; Historical	
N O V E M B E R	13	Angels vs Bullies	Director: Chris Turner; Cast: Harry Goodwins, Rosie Woolman, Eleanor Corcoran, Amarra Smith, Josh Huckett, Alex Barham, Christopher Turner, Katherine Austen	London Bus Theatre Company	Fantasy; Musical; Drama	
N O V E M B E R	14	Nativity 3: Dude, Where's My Donkey?	Director: Debbie Isitt; Cast: Martin Clunes, Marc Wootton, Catherine Tate, Celia Imrie, Jason Watkins	Entertainment One	Comedy	
N O V E M B E R	27	The Journey	Director: Lance Nielsen; Cast: Jason Flemyng, Linsey Coulson		Drama	
N O V E M B E R	28	Paddington	Director: Paul King; Cast: Hugh Bonneville, Nicole Kidman, Colin Firth, Julie Walters, Jim Broadbent, Peter Capaldi	StudioCanal UK	Comedy	
N O V E M B E R	29	Dry	Director: Stephanie Linus; Cast: Stephanie Okereke, Liz Benson, William McNamara, Darwin Shaw, Olu Jacobs, Paul Sambo	Silverbird Film Distribution	Drama	
D E C E M B E R	5	Black Sea	Director: Kevin Macdonald; Cast: Jude Law Scoot McNairy Ben Mendelsohn David Threlfall	Focus Features	Adventure; Thriller; Historical	
D E C E M B E R	5	Get Santa	Director: Christopher Smith; Cast: Jim Broadbent, Rafe Spall, Warwick Davis, Kit Connor	Warner Bros.	Comedy	
D E C E M B E R	8	Into the Woods	Director: Rob Marshall; Cast: Meryl Streep, Emily Blunt, James Corden, Anna Kendrick, Chris Pine, Tracey Ullman, Christine Baranski, Johnny Depp	Walt Disney Studios Motion Pictures	Musical; Fantasy	
D E C E M B E R	11	Night at the Museum: Secret of the Tomb	Director: Shawn Levy; Cast: Ben Stiller, Robin Williams, Owen Wilson, Steve Coogan, Dan Stevens, Ben Kingsley	20th Century Fox	Comedy; Fantasy	
D E C E M B E R	12	Exodus: Gods and Kings	Director: Ridley Scott; Cast: Christian Bale, Joel Edgerton, John Turturro, Aaron Paul, Ben Mendelsohn, Sigourney Weaver, Ben Kingsley	20th Century Fox	Epic; Biblical; Historical; Adventure; Drama	
D E C E M B E R	13	Kingsman: The Secret Service	Director: Matthew Vaughn; Cast: Colin Firth, Samuel L. Jackson, Mark Strong, Taron Egerton, Michael Caine	20th Century Fox	Action	
D E C E M B E R	17	Seventh Son	Director: Sergei Bodrov; Cast: Jeff Bridges, Julianne Moore, Ben Barnes, Alicia Vikander, Kit Harington, Olivia Williams, Antje Traue, Djimon Hounsou	Universal Pictures	Epic; Fantasy	
D E C E M B E R	25	Selma	Director: Ava DuVernay; Cast: David Oyelowo, Tom Wilkinson, Carmen Ejogo, Tim Roth, Oprah Winfrey	Paramount Pictures	Historical; Drama	
D E C E M B E R	27	Altar	Director: Nick Willing; Cast: Antonia Clarke, Matthew Modine, Olivia Williams	Content Media	Horror; Mystery; Thriller	
D E C E M B E R	30	The Woman in Black: Angel of Death	Director: Tom Harper; Cast: Phoebe Fox, Jeremy Irvine, Helen McCrory, Adrian Rawlins, Leanne Best, Ned Dennehy	Relativity Media	Horror; Historical	

== Minor releases ==
Title	Director	Release date	Genre
3 in a Bed	Lloyd Eyre-Morgan	1 August 2014	Comedy
50 Kisses	Chris Jones	February 2014	Comedy
59	Girish Patel		Drama
The 9th	Nathan Codrington	5 April 2014 (France)	Drama
Abducted	Mark Harris	17 March 2014	Action
Across the Unseen Sea	Tereza Stehlikova		Mystery
An Actor's Guide to Resting	Jonathan Wolff		Comedy
Akin	Robin Harvey	11 September 2014	Action
Alcina Pale Shadows	Nichola Bruce		Fantasy
All Heart	Tim Pieraccini	14 September 2014	Comedy
All in the Valley	Luke J. Hagan	1 October 2014	Drama
Almost Married	Ben Cookson	28 March 2014	Comedy
Al's Fresco	Ged Purvis	10 October 2014	Comedy
Amelie's Party	George Maddocks		Comedy
Amsterdam Express	Fatmir Koçi	27 March 2014 (Albania)	Drama
Ancient Demon Succubi	The Aquinas	14 February 2014 (USA)	Horror
And She Cried	John Farrington	1 May 2014 (UK)	Drama
Anxiety of the Mormons	Scott Rivers		Comedy
Apparition of Evil	Brel Offkel		Crime
Arjun & Alison	Sidharth Sharma	25 April 2014 (UK)	Action
Art Ache	Berty Cadilhac		Comedy
Art Party	Tim Newton	21 August 2014 (UK)	Drama
As Bad As Me	Daniel Pacquette	15 September 2014 (UK)	Drama
At Home Abroad	Ruke Amata	20 June 2014 (UK)	Comedy
Audax	Andrew St Maur	28 November 2014 (UK)	Action
Auguste	Billy Glew	December 2014 (UK)	Crime
Automatically Sunshine	Al Carretta		Crime
B33f	Kenneth-King	2014 (UK)	Crime
Bachelor Games	Edward McGown	1 July 2014 (Argentina)	Action
Backdrifters	Truan Flynn	18 October 2014 (UK)	Mystery
Bait	Dominic Brunt	5 November 2014 (UK)	Drama
The Ballad of Johnny Windows	Adriel Leff	1 April 2014 (USA)	Comedy
BBC Proms, Last Night from Around the Uk	Janet Fraser Crook	19 September 2014 (UK)	Musical
The Beat Beneath My Feet	John Williams	20 July 2015 (UK)	Comedy
Because of Writing	Pier Paolo De Rosa		Drama
Being Nice	Andrew Blackburn	14 November 2014 (UK)	Drama
Ben	Simon Powell		Drama
Benny & Jolene	Jamie Adams	6 June 2014 (UK)	Comedy
Big Society The Musical	Lynne Harwood	April 2014 (UK)	Drama
Bikini Girls v Dinosaurs	Kenneth D. Barker	21 March 2014 (UK)	Science fiction
Billy Bragg Live at the Union Chapel London	Jack Lilley	15 April 2014 (USA)	Musical
Billy Elliot the Musical Live	Stephen Daldry	28 September 2014 (UK)	Musical
Bismark the Joke	Abbeam Ampomah Danso	3 December 2014 (UK)	Comedy
Blackwood	Adam Wimpenny	1 August 2014 (UK)	Horror
Blitzfood	Sheridan James Lunt	April 2014 (UK)	Comedy
Blood Cells	Joseph Bull	27 June 2015 (UK)	Drama
Blood Moon	Jeremy Wooding	25 August 2014 (UK)	Horror
Bloodless	Richard Johnstone	31 January 2014 (UK)	Horror
Bloodshot	Raoul Girard	26 December 2014 (UK)	Horror
Bonobo	Mark Withers	3 May 2014 (UK)	Drama
Boys Behind Bars 2	Jason Impey	30 July 2014 (UK)	Drama
Bread & Circuses	Antony Meadley	2014 (UK)	Musical
The Breaker	Stuart Drennan	31 August 2014 (UK)	Thriller
Breaking the Bank	Vadim Jean	2015 (USA)	Comedy
Breaking Down	Jason Cooper	6 June 2014 (UK)	Thriller
Britten's Peter Grimes	Andrew Morahan	23 February 2014 (UK)	Musical
Broken England	Danny McCready	8 October 2014 (UK)	Drama
Brothers	Darren Lynch	18 September 2015 (USA)	Action
Buttercup Bill	Remy Bennett	4 September 2015 (UK)	Drama
Bypass	Duane Hopkins	11 October 2014 (UK)	Drama
The Cake Maker	Paulette Caletti		Comedy
Call-Back	Gaz Coward	21 December 2014 (UK)	Thriller
Camera Trap	Alex Verner		Thriller
Captain Sabertooth and the Treasure of Lama Rama	John Andreas Andersen	26 September 2014 (Norway)	Action
Carmen	Mahshad Afshar		
Castles in the Sky	Gillies MacKinnon	23 June 2014 (UK)	Drama
The Catch	Ben Myers	2014 (UK)	Comedy
CBeebies Prom from the Royal Albert Hall	Ian Russell	25 August 2014 (UK)	Musical
Celluloid	Lloyd Eyre-Morgan	27 January 2014 (UK)	Drama
Change for a Shilling	Steven Tayler	14 April 2014 (UK)	Drama
Checking In	Mark Adams	12 May 2014 (UK)	Comedy
Children in Manors	Elliot Bell	17 October 2014 (UK)	Drama
The Children of the Holocaust		12 September 2014 (UK)	Historical
Chronicles of Humanity: Regenades	Damien Valentine	19 September 2014 (UK)	Science fiction
Chuggers	Marcus J. Richardson		Comedy
City Council: Parrhesia in the Commons	Michael Ignaffo		Comedy
Cocos 1914: The Encounter Between HMAS Sydney and SMS Emden	Tristan Loraine	22 August 2014 (UK)	Historical
Code 0044	Dionysios Nikolaos Lountzis	2014 (UK)	Action
Coma	Erim Metto	2014 (UK)	Drama
Common Era	Francis Isaac		Drama
The Conversations	Marcus Flemmings		Comedy
C.O.O.L.I.O Time Travel Gangster	Paul J. Lane	30 June 2014 (UK)	Action
Craigs List	Chan Walrus	16 August 2014 (UK)	Comedy
Creation Theatre's MacBeth	Jonathan Holloway	15 October 2014 (UK)	Thriller
Crimson the Sleeping Owl	Chase Johnston-Lynch	10 December 2014 (UK)	Horror
The Crow Scarer	Tanya Cook		Drama
The Crucible	Yaël Farber	4 December 2014 (UK)	Drama
The Crypt	Mark Murphy	3 December 2014 (France)	Horror
Cryptic	Freddie Hutton-Mills	May 2015 (UK)	Comedy
Curse of the Phoenix	Robert Young	2014 (UK)	Horror
Cut: Unforgettable Night	Raed Abbas	28 July 2014 (Kuwait)	Action
D-Effects	Marc Gil	2014 (UK)	Thriller
Damaged	Darren A. Furniss		Drama
Dangerous Cripple	Taha ben Slim		Adventure
Dangerous Mind of a Hooligan	Greg Hall	19 May 2014 (UK)	Crime
Dano	Shahrokh Hosseini		Drama
Dara Says	Vasco de Sousa	6 November 2014 (UK)	Comedy
Dark Matter	Maurice Smith	13 May 2014 (UK)	Drama
The Darkest Universe	Tom Kingsley		Comedy
Dawn	Romed Wyder	1 March 2014 (Switzerland)	Drama
Dead and Awake	Alexander Fodor	15 December 2014 (UK)	Drama
Dead Cat	Stefan Georgiou	11 April 2014 (UK)	Comedy
Dead Weekend	Jay Cosme		Horror
Dead Wood	Paul Knight		Horror
Dear Sister	Matt Senior	10 September 2014 (UK)	Horror
Death Do Us Apart	Shaub Abdul Miah	1 July 2014 (UK)	Comedy
Death of a Farmer	Jack Eve	5 March 2014 (UK)	Drama
Dermaphoria	Ross Clarke	13 June 2014 (UK)	Crime
Detention	Erim Metto	2014 (UK)	Drama
The Devil's Bargain	Drew Cullingham	17 January 2014 (UK)	Drama
The Disappearance of Lenka Wood	Paul Tanter	15 May 2014 (USA)	Crime
D'ora	Delia Antal	6 February 2014 (UK)	Adventure
Down Dog	Andres Dussan	28 September 2014 (UK)	Comedy
The Drift	Darren Scales	6 December 2014 (UK)	Horror
Drinking Class	Jack Millard		Comedy
The Drug Tours	Sam Mason-Bell	18 April 2014 (UK)	Drama
Drunken Butterflies	Garry Sykes		Action
DrunksLikeUs	David Simpson	30 September 2014 (UK)	Comedy
Eagles Nest	Gaz Coward	30 September 2014 (UK)	Action
Early Bird	Andrew Flynn	September 2014 (UK)	Comedy
Echoes	Rajesh Shera	20 September 2014 (Netherlands)	Thriller
The Edit	Alireza Razazifar		Drama
Electricity	Bryn Higgins	12 December 2014 (UK)	Drama
Emulsion	Suki Singh	October 2014 (UK)	Drama
L'Enfant d'Beans	Daniel Searle	26 April 2014 (UK)	Comedy
Eternity for Us	John Griffiths		Drama
Eve	Ben Fullman	14 June 2014 (UK)	Horror
Exorcism	Lance Patrick	18 October 2014 (UK)	Horror
Exploited	Jason Impey	August 2014 (USA)	Horror
Extinction	Adam Spinks	24 August 2014 (UK)	Adventure
Extinction: Patient Zero	Joe Eckardt	1 February 2014 (UK)	Thriller
Father to Fall	Clare Speller		Drama
Fear of Water	Kate Lane	1 January 2016 (UK)	Drama
Feed the Devil	Max Perrier		Adventure
Fifty Fifty Ball	Alan de Pellette		Drama
Fille et flingue	Donald Takeshita-Guy	12 September 2014 (UK)	Drama
Flim: The Movie	Raffaello Degruttola	15 May 2014 (UK)	Comedy
The Final Haunting	Flaminia Graziadei	18 April 2015 (UK)	Drama
First Bite Is the Deepest	Eileen Daly	September 2014 (UK)	Comedy
Fishbowl	Martin McCann	30 April 2014 (UK)	Drama
The Floods That Foiled New Year: Caught on Camera		2014 (UK)	
Flowerman	Rob Burrows	26 March 2014 (USA)	Drama
For the Love of Money		5 September 2014 (UK)	Drama
Fossil	Alex Walker	28 April 2014 (UK)	Thriller
Fourever	Anton Saunders	28 September 2014 (UK)	Drama
Fratton	Jack Darcy Searle	July 2014 (UK)	Drama
From Here to Eternity the Musical	Tamara Harvey	3 July 2014 (UK)	Musical
Full English Breakfast	Manish Patel	7 April 2014 (UK)	Action
GAB Awards: Gathering of Africa's Best Award	Femi Okutubo	16 November 2014 (UK)	Family
Game Over			Drama
Gareth Thomas: Game Changer		20 October 2014 (UK)	Documentary
Geek Undead	Jason Jackson	28 October 2014 (UK)	Horror
Get Up and Go	Brendan Grant	1 May 2015 (Ireland)	Comedy
Ghosts	Robert Delamere	26 June 2014 (UK)	Drama
Gifts from Strangers	Marcus Caballero	1 July 2014 (UK)	Horror
Gitel	Robert Mullan		Drama
Gloria Jesus	Xavier Nellens	2014 (USA)	Comedy
Godforsaken	Ranjeet S. Marwa	22 February 2014 (UK)	Mystery
The Goob	Guy Myhill	29 May 2015 (UK)	Drama
The Gospel of John	David Batty	14 August 2015 (Germany)	Drama
Gregor	Mickey Down		Comedy
Greyhawk	Guy Pitt	19 June 2014 (UK)	Drama
Gypsy Cops!	Mark J. Elias	3 January 2014 (UK)	Comedy
Hackney's Finest	Chris Bouchard	3 April 2015 (UK)	Action
The Hatching	Michael Anderson	31 May 2014 (UK)	Comedy
The Haunting of Baylock Residence	Anthony M. Winson	25 February 2014 (UK)	Horror
The Haunting of Harry Payne	Martyn Pick	13 January 2014 (UK)	Horror
He Who Dares	Paul Tanter	16 May 2014 (Vietnam)	Action
He Who Dares: Downing Street Siege	Paul Tanter	24 August 2015 (Netherlands)	Action
The Healer	James Erskine		Drama
The Heartbroke Hitman	Jon Santilli	1 August 2014 (UK)	Comedy
Her Name Is Pinky	Scott Rivers	31 August 2014 (UK)	Horror
Here and Now	Lisle Turner	4 July 2014 (UK)	Drama
Here Lies	Duncan Ward	31 March 2013 (UK)	Drama
Highway to Dhampus	Rick McFarland	September 2015	Drama
Hollywood Betrayed	Eileen Daly	September 2014 (UK)	Comedy
Home for Christmas	Jamie Patterson	5 December 2014 (UK)	Comedy
Homerton Express	Peter Collis		Mystery
Honeycomb Lodge	Lesley Manning	2014 (UK)	Drama
Honeytrap	Rebecca Johnson	17 October 2014 (UK)	Crime
Honour	Shan Khan	4 April 2014 (UK)	Thriller
Horace K48	Christopher Hutchins		Horror
House of Afflictions	Anthony M. Winson	25 October 2014 (UK)	Horror
The House of Him	Robert Florence	31 October 2014 (UK)	Horror
The House of Silence	Lawrence Parmenter	8 August 2014 (UK)	Horror
The House on Cuckoo Lane	David Hinds	23 August 2014 (UK)	Horror
How Not to Work & Claim Benefits... (and Other Useful Information for Wasters)	Patrick McConnell		Comedy
How to Make a Movie for 43 Pounds	Rhys Davies	8 February 2014 (UK)	Comedy
Huba	Anna Sasnal	24 October 2014 (Poland)	Drama
Hungerford	Drew Casson	3 May 2014 (UK)	Horror
The Hunted	Lance Patrick		Horror
The Hunting	Allan Plenderleith	30 October 2014 (UK)	Horror
The Hybrid	Billy O'Brien	3 April 2014 (Sweden)	Action
I Am Cursed	Shiraz Khan	September 2014 (UK)	Drama
I Am Soldier	Ronnie Thompson	17 March 2014 (UK)	Action
I Put My Heart Into This Film	Lawrence Mallinson	15 March 2014 (UK)	Horror
Icicle	Steven Tayler	26 June 2014 (UK)	Thriller
Il mistero di Dante	Louis Nero	14 February 2014 (Italy)	Biography
In Abigail's Place	Steven Hines	30 October 2014 (UK)	Horror
In Transit	Marius Smuts	6 September 2014 (UK)	Comedy
Index Zero	Lorenzo Sportiello	20 June 2015 (UK)	Science fiction
The Insignificance of Being Gwendolen	Lisa Theresa Downey-Dent	14 February 2014 (UK)	Comedy
The Intent	Kalvadour Peterson	10 November 2014 (UK)	Crime
Interference	Nick Pilton	17 April 2014 (UK)	Comedy
Interrogating Catherine	Douglas Stevens	10 August 2015 (UK)	Thriller
Into Dust	Gage Oxley	18 November 2014 (UK)	Action
It Never Sleeps	Matt Mitchell		Horror
Ivy	Craig McLearie		Crime
iWitness	Steve Rainbow	2014 (UK)	Drama
Jagoda	Lex Pokane	8 April 2014 (UK)	Horror
Jailhouse Dog	Richard Connew	1 May 2014 (UK)	Drama
Jeff Lynne's ELO at Hyde Park		17 October 2014 (UK)	Musical
John	Lloyd Newson	9 December 2014 (UK)	Drama
Le jour du père	Josef Cannon	January 2014 (USA)	Drama
Kajaki	Paul Katis	28 November 2014 (UK)	Adventure
Kasabian Summer Solstice	James Russell	16 July 2014 (UK)	Musical
Keeping Rosy	Steve Reeves	2014 (UK)	Drama
A Killer Conversation	David V.G. Davies	17 February 2015	Comedy
Killing for Rachael	Scott Rivers	31 October 2014 (UK)	Crime
Killing Time	Sam Kennard		Drama
Lady Gaga the Art of Music	NJ Silva	18 September 2014 (USA)	Biography
Land of Sunshine	Grant McPhee	3 November 2014 (UK)	Horror
The Last Day of Winter	Sergio Fabio Ferrari	1 November 2014 (UK)	Drama
The Last Sparks of Sundown	James Kibbey	17 April 2015 (UK)	Comedy
Leading Lady	Henk Pretorius	7 June 2014 (USA)	Comedy
Leatherbird	Rupert Hill	1 September 2014 (UK)	Comedy
Lee Evans: Monsters	Addison Cresswell	14 November 2014 (UK)	Comedy
Legacy	Nick Archer	30 August 2014 (UK)	Thriller
Legacy of Thorn	Mj Dixon	27 October 2014 (UK)	Action
Legend of the Golden Fishcake	John O'Lone		Adventure
Let the Die Be Cast: Initium	Timothy Reynard	7 December 2014 (UK)	Drama
Let the Lion Roar	Vanessa Frank	19 September 2014 (USA)	Historical
Life and Love in 10 Songs	George Fleming	25 September 2014 (UK)	Drama
Life and Other Disappointments	Matthew J. Kent	6 December 2014 (UK)	Drama
Llar	Ramón Lluís Bande	24 November 2014 (Argentina)	Drama
Lock In	Mark J. Howard	17 January 2014 (UK)	Horror
London Latino	Mateo Manaure	1 January 2014 (UK)	Action
London Scally	Scott Musgrave	20 October 2014 (UK)	Drama
Looters, Tooters and Sawn-Off Shooters	Darren James King	22 September 2014 (UK)	Drama
Lord of the Dance: Dangerous Games	Paul Dugdale	24 November 2014 (UK)	Musical
Lords of London	Antonio Simoncini	6 January 2014 (UK)	Crime
Lost Existence	Benedict Sampays	1 August 2014 (UK)	Drama
Lost in Karastan	Ben Hopkins	21 May 2015 (Germany)	Comedy
Love in the Post	Joanna Callaghan	25 March 2014 (UK)Bola Akande	Drama
Love Uncut	Bola Akande	5 April 2014 (UK)	Drama
Loved by You... Always	Nicky Preston		Comedy
Lucifer's Night	Henry W. Smith	23 October 2014 (UK)	Horror
Luna	Dave McKean	6 September 2014 (Canada)	Drama
M.L.E.	Sarah Warren	2014 (UK)	Comedy
Macbeth	Eve Best	25 June 2014 (UK)	Drama
The Mad Monkey Crew 2	Ryan Firth	25 December 2014 (UK)	Action
The Maid	Paul Emmanuel	12 April 2014 (USA)	Drama
Mantovani, the King of Strings	Alan Byron	26 May 2014 (UK)	Biography
Maria Graham: Diary of a Residence in Chile	Valeria Sarmiento		Biography
Marriage	Katerina Philippou	1 August 2014 (UK)	Drama
Marriage in the Dark	Silver Achugamonye	28 June 2014 (UK)	Drama
Maverbricks	Josh Wells		Comedy
May Fly	Yaw Asiyama	28 October 2014 (UK)	Drama
May It Happen For You	Andrew Silver		Drama
McBusted Live at the O2	Matt Askem	24 November 2014 (UK)	Musical
Metamorforsia	Cosmotropia de Xam	11 July 2014 (Germany)	Horror
Miraculous	Yaw Asiyama	1 October 2014 (UK)	Historical
Miss in Her Teens	Matthew Butler	15 April 2014 (Canada)	Comedy
Modern Toss	Sam McKinstrie		Comedy
Montana	Mo Ali	11 December 2014 (UK)	Action
Monty Python Live (Mostly)	Eric Idle	20 July 2014 (UK)	Comedy
The Mothertown	John Williams	21 December 2014 (UK)	Comedy
The Mothman Curse	Richard Mansfield	30 April 2015 (USA)	Horror
Mr Crispin	Eileen Daly	September 2014 (UK)	Comedy
Mum, Dad, Meet Sam	Tony Sebastian Ukpo	6 December 2014 (UK)	Comedy
My Accomplice	Charlie Weaver Rolfe	2014 (UK)	Comedy
My World	Magdolna Cecília Eröss	10 April 2014 (Hungary)	Drama
Narcissists	Josh Crooks	18 July 2014 (UK)	Crime
Narcopolis	Justin Trefgarne		Mystery
National Theatre Live: Medea	Carrie Cracknell	4 September 2014 (UK)	Drama
National Theatre Live: A Small Family Business	Adam Penford	12 June 2014 (UK)	
Nazi Vengeance	Tom Sands	10 February 2015 (UK)	Horror
Need for Weed	Trev Lewis	8 April 2014 (UK)	Comedy
Neffy mini web series	Melissa Blake	June 2014 (UK)	Drama
Nice 2 Meet U	Naveen Medaram		Comedy
Night Bus	Simon Baker	12 October 2014 (UK)	Comedy
The Night Runner	Steve Looker		Drama
The Nightman of Nevermoor	Chris Thomas	4 February 2014 (UK)	Adventure
Nocturnal Activity		1 November 2014 (UK)	Horror
Noël Coward's Private Lives	Jonathan Kent	5 April 2014 (Australia)	Comedy
Noirish Project	James Devereaux	May 2014 (UK)	Comedy
Noirland	Philip Henry	30 March 2014 (UK)	Crime
Not All There	Louis Binns	27 December 2014 (UK)	
Nowhere	Tez Palmer		Drama
The Old Irish WasherWoman	Carleton Rodgers	15 August 2014 (Ireland)	Drama
Olive Green	Suki Singh	17 March 2014 (UK)	Action
Olivia Twist	Arno Hazebroek	16 April 2015 (UK)	Drama
On the Run	Anthony Roberts		Action
On the Surface	Harris Alvi	5 September 2014 (UK)	Crime
One Crazy Thing	Amit Gupta	2014 (UK)	Comedy
One Night	Stiv Bagnall		Crime
Only a Free Individual Can Create a Free Society	Grace Schwindt	September 2014 (Germany)	Biography
Opening Night of the Living Dead	Joshua Dickinson	17 August 2014 (UK)	Comedy
Ortega and His Enemies	Malcolm Benson	1 July 2014 (UK)	Crime
The Oscar Nominated Short Films 2014: Animation	Mac McDonald	25 February 2014 (USA)	Animation
The Oscar Nominated Short Films 2014: Live Action		31 January 2014 (USA)	Drama
Out for Revenge	Howard James Blake	20 September 2014 (UK)	Action
P.O.V	Richard Anthony Dunford		Horror
Panic	Sean Spencer	1 July 2015 (UK)	Drama
Parallel Lines	Jackie Clark	2014 (UK)	Drama
Partner in Crime	Dan Delglyn		Drama
Passengers	John Hales	2015 (UK)	Drama
Patchwork	Mark Garvey	1 May 2014 (UK)	Drama
Peterman	Mark Abraham	19 November 2014 (UK)	Drama
Phometrica	Chris Collier		Comedy
A Practical Guide to a Spectacular Suicide	Graham Hughes	24 June 2014	Comedy
Precipice Hours	Richard Weston	30 January 2014 (UK)	Drama
The President	Mohsen Makhmalbaf	18 March 2015 (France)	Drama
The Profession	Alex Gylanders		Crime
Promakhos	Coerte Voorhees	September 2015 (UK)	Drama
Prose & Cons	Catherine Balavage	7 February 2014 (UK)	Comedy
Psychotic State	Derek Young	1 March 2014 (USA)	Drama
The Pull	Jenni Townsend	22 June 2014 (Canada)	Drama
Pure Bloodlines: Blood's Thicker Than Water	Gerald Royston Horler	31 August 2014 (UK)	Action
Queen & Country	John Boorman	12 June 2015 (UK)	Drama
Radiator	Tom Browne	15 October 2014 (UK)	Drama
The Red Hat	Cindy Scott		Comedy
The Redwood Massacre	David Ryan Keith	5 October 2014 (UK)	Fantasy
The Religion Is the Blues	Antonio Rui Ribeiro	29 May 2014 (UK)	Biography
Remnants of a Disaster	Roger Armstrong	15 November 2014 (UK)	Fantasy
The Resonance	Michael Beddoes	18 December 2015 (UK)	Horror
The Return	Oliver Nias		Crime
Robert Burns: It's Personal	Andrew Neil		
The Roman	Simon Rawson		Historical
Royal Shakespeare Company: Henry IV Part I	Gregory Doran	14 May 2014 (UK)	Comedy
Royal Shakespeare Company: Henry IV Part II	Gregory Doran	18 June 2014 (UK)	Comedy
Salvation	Louise Iddon	November 2014 (UK)	Drama
Sarata	Ibrahim Ceesay	18 February 2015 (UK)	Drama
Scarecrow	Matthew Rankcom	31 October 2014 (UK)	Horror
The Scissoring	Liz Wilde	1 November 2014 (UK)	Horror
The Scopia Effect	Christopher Butler		Horror
Seat of Judgement	Mark Bellinger	14 March 2014 (UK)	Thriller
Second Coming	Debbie Tucker Green	5 June 2015 (UK)	Drama
The Second Coming: Brought to You in Low Definition	Andrew Savage		Comedy
The Secret of the Gods	Armand Mastroianni		Adventure
The Secret Path	Richard Mansfield	June 2014 (USA)	Fantasy
Serial Kaller	Dan Brownlie	1 October 2014 (UK)	Horror
Seve the Movie	John-Paul Davidson	27 June 2014 (UK)	Drama
Seven Lucky Gods	Jamil Dehlavi	10 April 2015 (UK)	Drama
Seven Streets, Two Markets and a Wedding	Deborah Salter	23 May 2014 (UK)	Biography
Shadow Gene	Mark Norfolk	2 September 2014 (Italy)	Drama
Shadow Industry	Henry Vought		Mystery
Shadows of a Stranger	Chris Clark	23 September 2014 (UK)	Crime
Shakespeare's Globe: A Midsummer Night's Dream	Dominic Dromgoole	15 July 2014 (UK)	Comedy
She Moved Through the Fair	Owen Franklin		Drama
Shooting for Socrates	James Erskine	12 June 2015 (UK)	Comedy
Shooting on the Rim	Thomas Oldham		Comedy
Short Supply	Kevin Molony		Comedy
Shortcuts to Hell: Volume II	Tom Lox	18 August 2014 (UK)	Horror
The Silent Storm	Corinna McFarlane	14 October 2014 (UK)	Drama
Sins of a Father	Andrew Piddington		Drama
Skeletons	Craig-James Moncur	11 October 2014 (UK)	Crime
Slaughter Is the Best Medicine	Rishi Thaker	21 April 2014 (UK)	Action
The Slayers: Portrait of a Dismembered Family	Alex Poray		Drama
Slaypril Fools Day	Mj Dixon	1 April 2014 (UK)	Horror
A Smallholding	Chris New		Drama
Soft Lad	Leon Lopez	9 November 2015 (UK)	Drama
Sokolov	Maxim Tillman	20 October 2014 (Germany)	Crime
A Soldiers Regret	Asawari Jagushte		Drama
Some Things	Fredi 'Kruga' Nwaka		Drama
The Son of Raw's the Roman	Simon Rawson	2014 (UK)	Thriller
SOS: Save Our Skins	Kent Sobey	4 April 2014 (Canada)	Comedy
The Sound of Fury	Kate Elizabeth Sheppard	6 December 2014 (UK)	Drama
Spellbound	Tom Luc Sahara		Romance
Sphere of Fear	John Mitchell	18 June 2014 (USA)	Comedy
Spider-Man: Lost Cause	Joey Lever	26 September 2014 (UK)	Action
Spiritual Contact the Movie	Emerson Pinheiro	26 November 2014 (UK)	Thriller
The Spoiler	Katharine Collins	11 April 2014 (UK)	Thriller
The Spy Who Brought Down Mary, Queen of Scots	Mark Fielder	2014 (UK)	Historical
Spyfail	John Quigley	28 April 2014 (UK)	Action
The Squeakies	Howard Jameson		Comedy
The Stagg Do	James DeMarco	26 June 2014 (UK)	Comedy
Star Wars: The Force Unleashed II	Shaun Robertson	3 February 2014 (UK)	Science fiction
Stephen Fry Live: More Fool Me	Stephen Fry	1 October 2014 (UK)	Comedy
Still	Simon Blake	2014 (UK)	Thriller
Stockholm	Kashman Harris		Drama
Stormbringer	Kevin Lucero Less	11 May 2014 (USA)	Drama
The Stranger	John Craig Howells		Drama
Strangest Story of Six Strangers	Kalpesh Ci Patel		Comedy
The Street	Stephen Patrick Kenny	10 July 2016 (Ireland)	Crime
Subconscious Society	Rosa Barba	29 May 2014 (Germany)	
Sunday for Sammy	Geoff Wonfor	1 May 2014 (UK)	Musical
Sunday Knights	Johnny Sawyer	15 January 2014 (UK)	Adventure
Survival Instinct	Steve Lawson		Action
Tainted Love	Will Moore	15 January 2014 (UK)	Mystery
Take It Back and Start All Over	Neil Rolland		Drama
Tales of Albion	Gary Andrews	21 December 2014 (UK)	Fantasy
Tariro	Ian William Bennett	14 October 2014 (UK)	Drama
Tea & Sangria	Peter Domankiewicz	24 April 2015 (UK)	Comedy
Teen Reaper		2016 (UK)	Adventure
Tell Them of Us	Nick Loven		Biography
The Tempest	Jeremy Herrin	28 May 2014 (UK)	Comedy
Ten Pieces	Oliver Smyth	6 October 2014 (UK)	Musical
Territory	Reuben Johnson	8 October 2014 (UK)	Drama
Terroir	John Jopson	17 October 2014 (Italy)	Drama
Terror	Mumtaz Yildirimlar	15 August 2014 (UK)	Horror
Terry Gilliam's Benvenuto Cellini - English National Opera	Andrew Morahan	17 June 2014 (UK)	Musical
Thalidomide: The Fifty Year Fight	Stuart Strickson	May 2014 (UK)	
Theatre of Fear	Andrew Jones	8 September 2014 (UK)	Horror
Thirst for Blood	Christopher Nicholson		
This Is Not Happening	Ewan Thomas	2 July 2015 (UK)	Drama
Three Crazy Kids	Sam Davey	1 August 2014 (UK)	Adventure
Three Days	Darren S. Cook	30 January 2014 (UK)	Comedy
Through the Lens	Oscar Forshaw Swift		Action
Ti offro da bere	Ilaria Gambarelli		Comedy
Time and Place	Michael Henry	1 November 2014 (UK)	Drama
Time Does Not Pass	Marco Schleicher	29 October 2014 (UK)	Drama
To Love Somebody	Benjamin Rider	12 August 2014 (UK)	Drama
Tomorrow Is Always Too Long	Phil Collins	18 October 2014 (UK)	Musical
Tomorrow May Never Come	Keir Beckwith	2014 (UK)	Drama
Tony Bennett & Lady Gaga: Cheek to Cheek Live!	David Horn	20 December 2014 (UK)	Musical
Torn: A Shock Youmentary	Justin Carter	1 January 2014 (UK)	Drama
The Trailer	Nick Emm		Comedy
Trapped	Drew Stewart	January 2014 (USA)	Horror
The Trinity of Darkness	Mariano Baino	10 July 2014 (France)	Horror
Trolleybus Island	Tim Biglowe		Comedy
The Truth	Tony Clarke	31 May 2014 (UK)	Action
The Turtle and the Sea	Marek Budzynski	2014 (UK)	Action
Twilightofthefreakingods	George Fleming	25 October 2014 (UK)	Drama
Twink	Jason Impey	22 March 2014 (UK)	Drama
The Twisted Death of a Lonely Madman	Will' Terran		Drama
Two Housemates	Ryan Watson		Comedy
Two Very Long Days	Patrick Moorhouse	28 June 2014 (UK)	Drama
Two Women	Vera Glagoleva	23 November 2014 (Poland)	Drama
UK Ghost Hunts	Lee Steer	24 September 2014 (UK)	Horror
United We Fall	Gary Sinyor	17 October 2014 (UK)	Comedy
Valley of the Demon	Rhodri Jones	30 September 2014 (UK)	Horror
Valley of the Witch	Andrew Jones	13 January 2015 (USA)	Horror
Vampires: Lucas Rising	Jason Davitt	9 October 2014 (UK)	Horror
Vandalis	Peter Wallder	27 October 2014 (UK)	Drama
A Vault of Victims	Maria Lee Metheringham	12 September 2014	Horror
Velociraptor McQuade	Peter Murfet		Action
Viking: The Berserkers	Antony Smith	15 September 2014 (UK)	Action
Violet City	John Maxwell		Adventure
Walking with the Ferryman	Adrian Hume Robinson	31 August 2015 (USA)	Drama
Wandering	Andrew Compton		Drama
Wandering Rose	Corrie Greenop	2 June 2015 (USA)	Horror
War Book	Tom Harper	7 August 2015 (UK)	Drama
The War I Knew	Ian Vernon	5 April 2014 (USA)	Action
Wasteland 26: Six Tales of Generation Y	Keir Siewert		Drama
We are Monster	Antony Petrou	1 May 2015 (UK)	Drama
We Still Kill the Old Way (2014 film)	Sacha Bennett	12 December 2014 (UK)	Action
Westfalia		2014 (Germany)	Comedy
What Goes Up	Matt Gambell	19 December 2014 (UK)	Comedy
What's the Score?	Justin Smith	1 May 2014 (UK)	Comedy
Where I Belong	Fritz Urschitz	15 October 2014 (USA)	Drama
White Collar Hooligan 3	Paul Tanter	28 July 2014 (UK)	Crime
Wigilia	Graham Drysdale	24 December 2014 (UK)	Drama
A Wonderful Christmas Time	Jamie Adams	24 November 2014	Comedy
Woodfalls	David Campion	5 September 2014 (UK)	Drama
X Moor	Luke Hyams	25 August 2014 (UK)	Horror
Year Zero: Black Country	Billy Dosanjh		Historical
You (Us) Me	Max Sobol	5 October 2014 (South Korea)	Drama
Z Joke	Aleksey Zalevskiy	June 2014 (China)	Action
Z-Listers	Kris Smith	10 October 2014 (UK)	Comedy
Zip-Code	Russell North	2015 (UK)	Adventure
Zombie Killers from Another Planet	Keith Huckfield		Horror
Zombie Resurrection	Jake Hawkins	23 March 2015 (UK)	Horror

== Co-productions ==
Of the 130 major British releases of 2014, 79 were co-productions with at least one other country. As with other years, the largest number of co-productions were made with the United States, with 40 films, which include all ten of the top ten highest grossing British films of the year. They are listed in full below.

Rank	Country	Number	Films	Ref.
1	United States (including Puerto Rico)	39	A Most Wanted Man, Back in the Day, Before I Disappear, Before I Go to Sleep, Better Living Through Chemistry, Black Sea, Dead Snow: Red vs. Dead, Exodus: Gods and Kings, Fury, Get on Up, Get Santa, Guardians of the Galaxy, Hide and Seek, In the Blood, Interstellar, Into the Woods, Kingsman: The Secret Service, Learning to Drive, Maleficent, Miss Julie, My Old Lady, Need for Speed, Night at the Museum: Secret of the Tomb, Non-Stop, Selma, Seventh Son, The Face of an Angel, The Grand Budapest Hotel, The Guest, The Imitation Game, The November Man, The Prince, The Quiet Ones, The Two Faces of January, The Woman in Black: Angel of Death, Transcendence, Treehouse, Walking on Sunshine, X-Men: Days of Future Past	
2	France	11	Before I Go to Sleep, Gemma Bovery, Jimmy's Hall, Miss Julie, Mr. Turner, My Old Lady, Need for Speed, Non-Stop, Paddington, Pride, The Smoke, The Two Faces of January	
3	Ireland	9	An Bronntanas, Calvary, Frank, Jimmy's Hall, Let Us Prey, Miss Julie, Mrs. Brown's Boys D'Movie, The Canal, The Quiet Hour	
4	Germany	8	A Long Way Down, A Most Wanted Man, Big Game, Hector and the Search for Happiness, Love, Rosie, Meet Me in Montenegro, Mr. Turner, The Grand Budapest Hotel	
5	Canada	6	Hector and the Search for Happiness, Into the Woods, Miss Julie, Seventh Son, Son of a Gun, The Woman in Black: Angel of Death	
6	China	4	Fury, Secret Sharer, Seventh Son, Transcendence	
7=	Norway	3	Dead Snow: Red vs. Dead, Meet Me in Montenegro, Miss Julie	
7=	South Africa	3	Hector and the Search for Happiness, Outpost 37, The Salvation	
7=	Spain	3	Exodus: Gods and Kings, The Adventurer: The Curse of the Midas Box, The Face of an Angel	
10=	Australia	2	Son of a Gun, The Journey	
10=	Belgium	2	The Adventurer: The Curse of the Midas Box, The Salvation	
10=	India	2	Bhopal: A Prayer for Rain, Ramanujan	
10=	Italy	2	The Face of an Angel, Walking on Sunshine	
10=	Sweden	2	Before I Go to Sleep, The Salvation	
10=	United Arab Emirates	2	Desert Dancer, Theeb	
16=	Brazil	1	Trash	
16=	Denmark	1	The Salvation	
16=	Congo	1	Virunga	
16=	Finland	1	Big Game	
16=	Greece	1	The Journey	
16=	Hungary	1	The Duke of Burgundy	
16=	Iceland	1	Dead Snow: Red vs. Dead	
16=	Jordan	1	Theeb	
16=	Lithuania	1	Redirected	
16=	Montenegro	1	Meet Me in Montenegro	
16=	Morocco	1	Desert Dancer	
16=	Netherlands	1	Deadly Virtues	
16=	New Zealand	1	The Dead Lands	
16=	Pakistan	1	Tamanna	
16=	Philippines	1	Need for Speed	
16=	Poland	1	Secret Sharer	
16=	Qatar	1	Theeb	
16=	Romania	1	Desert Dancer	
16=	Russia	1	Black Sea	
16=	Serbia	1	Ironclad: Battle for Blood	
16=	Switzerland	1	The Ninth Cloud	
16=	Thailand	1	Secret Sharer	
16=	Turkey	1	Little Happiness	
16=	Vietnam	1	Noble	

== Highest-grossing films ==
Listed here are the highest grossing British films of 2014, with their total earnings listed in British pound sterling. It includes films released in previous years that made money in 2014, particularly those that had minor releases in 2013 but their main releases in 2014.

Highest-Grossing British Films of 2014
Rank	Title	Studio	Worldwide gross
1	Exodus: Gods and Kings	20th Century Fox	£175,000,000
2	Non-Stop	Universal Pictures	£145,490,000

== Critical reception ==
Listed here are the top ten best and worst British films of those released in 2014, and listed above as major releases, as per the review aggregators Rotten Tomatoes and Metacritic. The critical scores for Rotten Tomatoes are out of a maximum score of 100, as is the critical score for Metacritic.

=== Rotten Tomatoes ===
Top 10 best reviewed films
Rank	Film	Rating	No. of reviews	Ref.
1	Virunga	100%	13	
2	Theeb	100%	11	
3	Selma	99%	211	
4	Mr. Turner	98%	177	
5	Paddington	98%	128	
6	Appropriate Behavior	98%	45	
7	'71	96%	120	
8	20,000 Days on Earth	95%	80	
9	The Grand Budapest Hotel	92%	258	
10	Frank	92%	147	

Top 10 worst reviewed films
Rank	Film	Rating	No. of reviews	Ref.
1	The Anomaly	0%	15	
2	Pudsey: The Movie	0%	13	
3	The Prince	0%	9	
4	Mrs. Brown's Boys D'Movie	7%	14	
5	Nativity 3: Dude, Where's My Donkey?	11%	18	
6	Back in the Day	11%	9	
7	Seventh Son	12%	107	
8	Plastic	12%	25	
9	The Rendlesham UFO Incident	14%	7	
10	Outpost 37	15%	13	

=== Metacritic ===
Top 10 best reviewed films
Rank	Film	Rating	No. of reviews	Ref.
1	Virunga	95	5	
2	Mr. Turner	94	44	
3	Selma	89	46	
4	The Grand Budapest Hotel	88	48	
5	The Duke of Burgundy	87	24	
6	'71	83	34	
7	Pride	79	36	
8	Calvary	77	42	
9	Paddington	77	38	
10	Guardians of the Galaxy	76	46	

Top 10 worst reviewed films
Rank	Film	Rating	No. of reviews	Ref.
1	Back in the Day	7	5	
2	The Prince	19	7	
3	Ironclad: Battle for Blood	22	4	
4	Outpost 37	26	8	
5	The Anomaly	27	7	
6	The Rendlesham UFO Incident	28	5	
7	Hector and the Search for Happiness	29	28	
8	Seventh Son	30	32	
9	Plastic	32	10	
10	A Long Way Down	34	21	

== British award winners ==
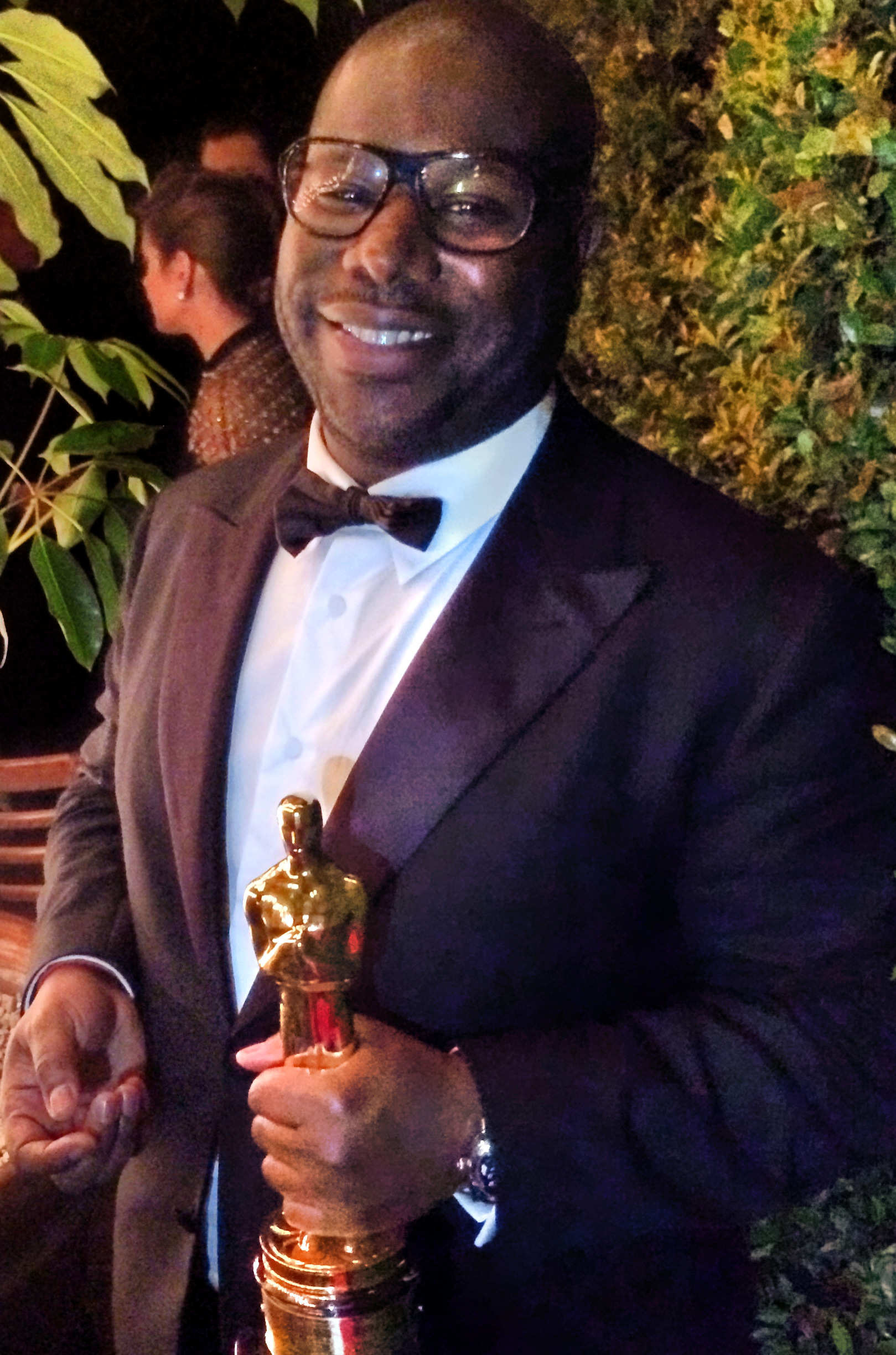
Steve McQueen, the multiple award-winning director of 12 Years a Slave

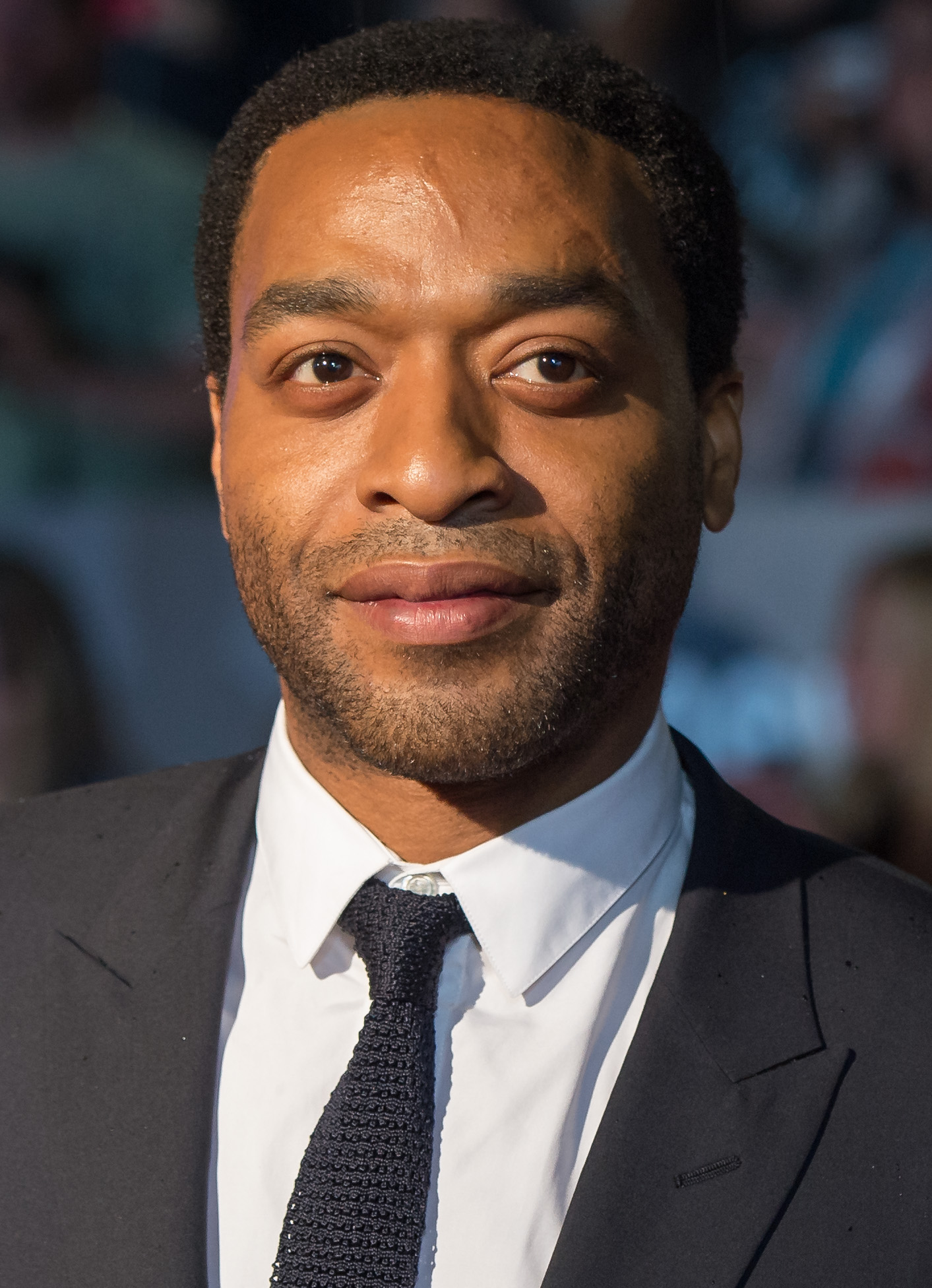
Chiwetel Ejiofor, winner of the BAFTA for Best Actor in a Leading Role

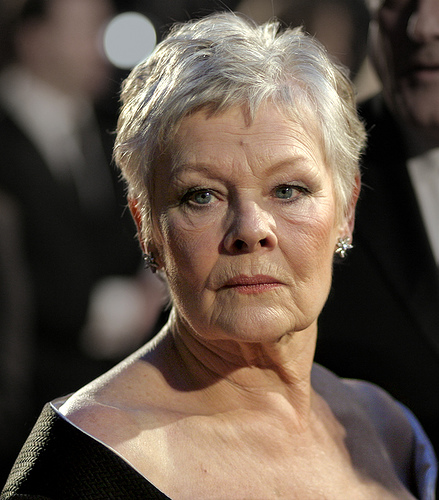
Dame Judi Dench received multiple awards nominations for her portrayal of Philomena Lee in Philomena.

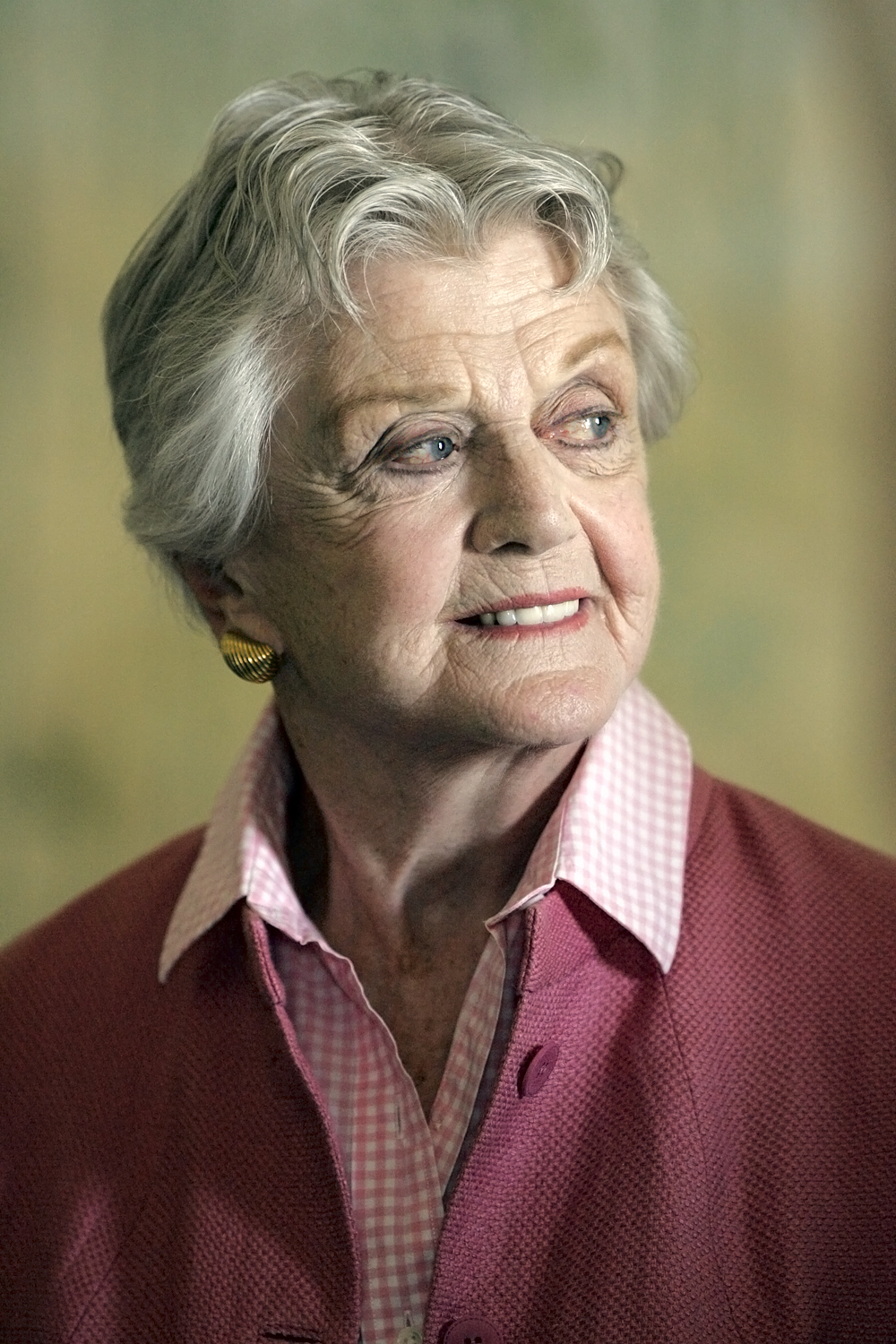
Dame Angela Lansbury won the Academy Honorary Award.

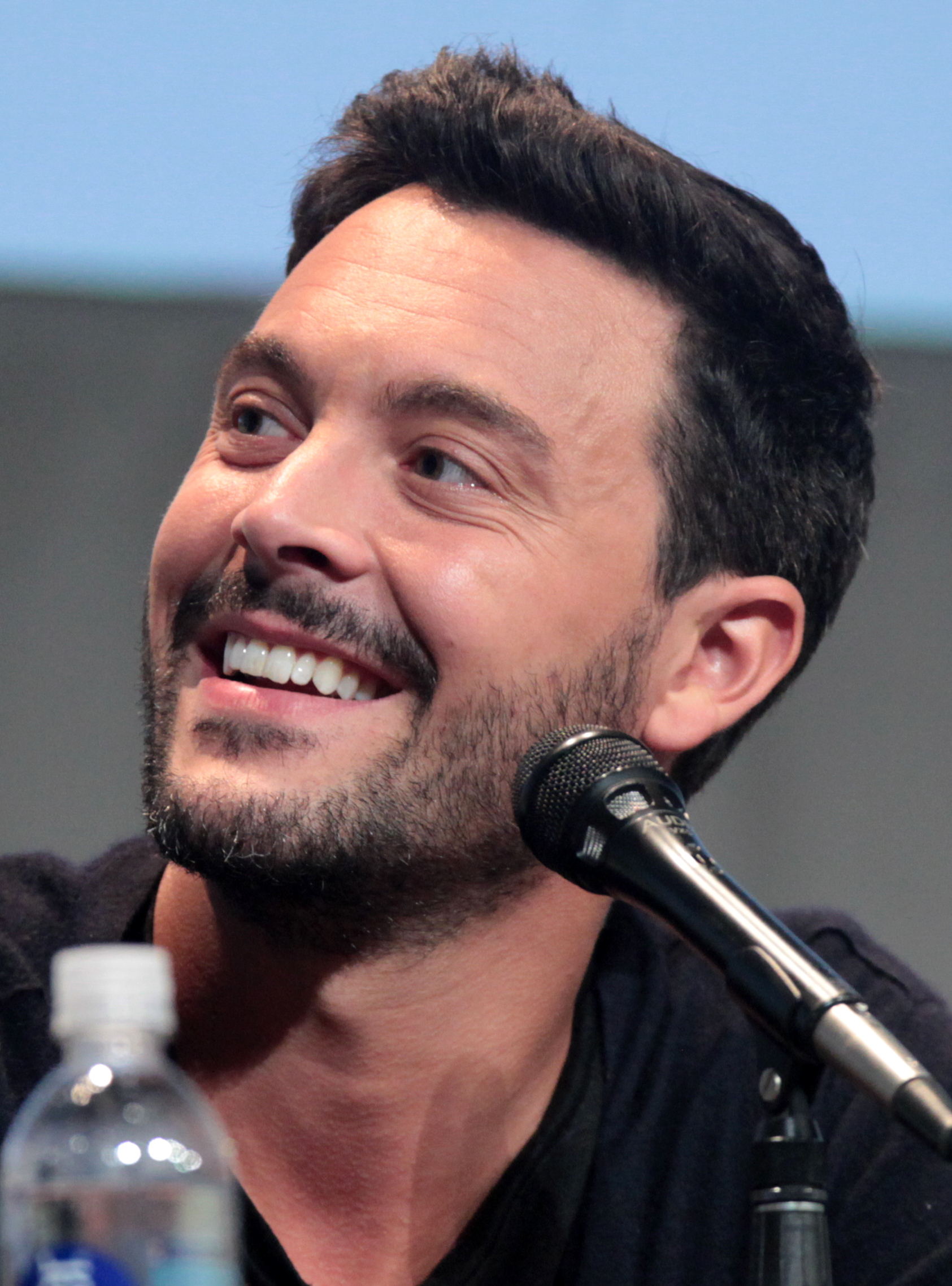
Jack Huston was one of only two British winners at the Screen Actors Guild Awards, as part of the cast of American Hustle.

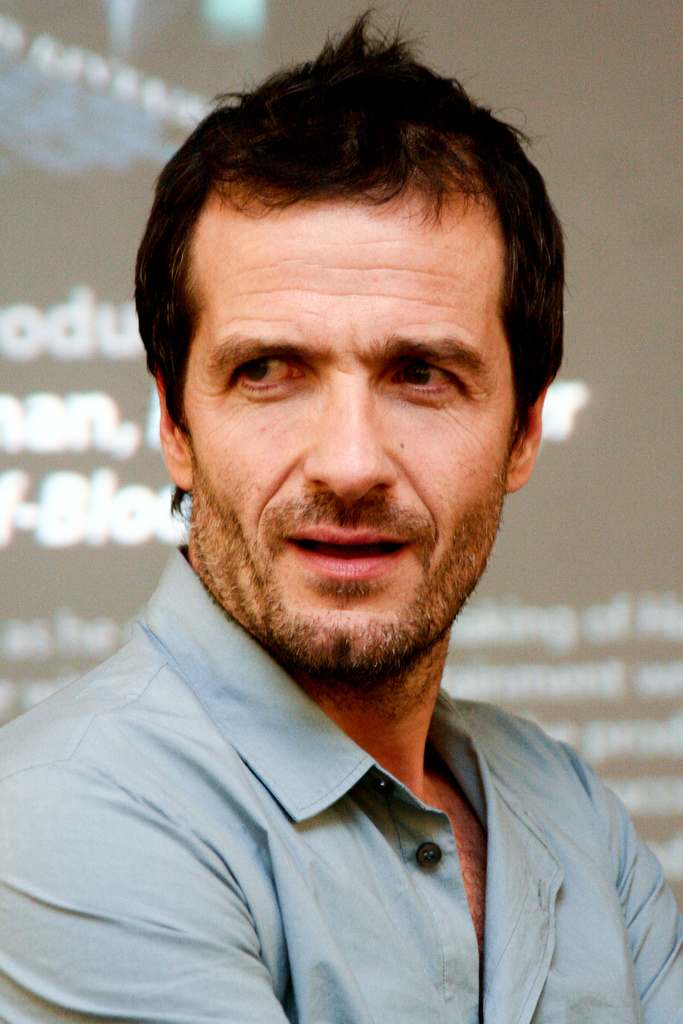
David Heyman, the multiple award winning producer of Gravity

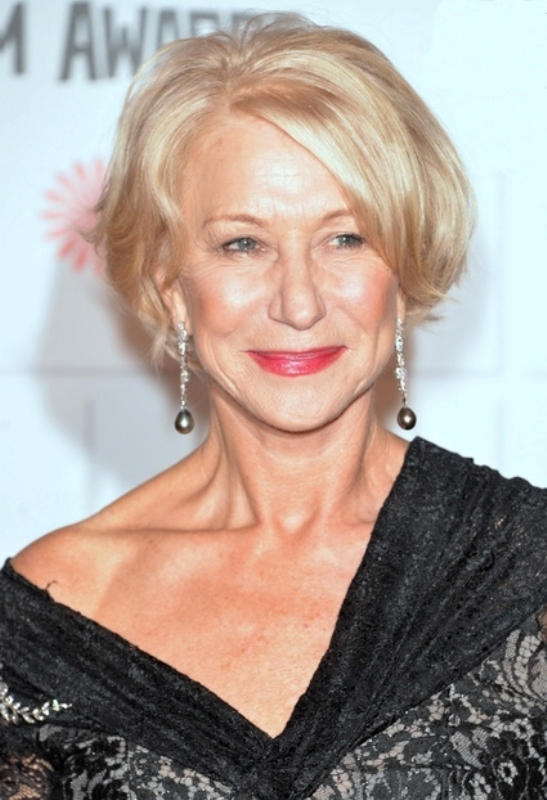
Dame Helen Mirren won the British Academy Fellowship Award.

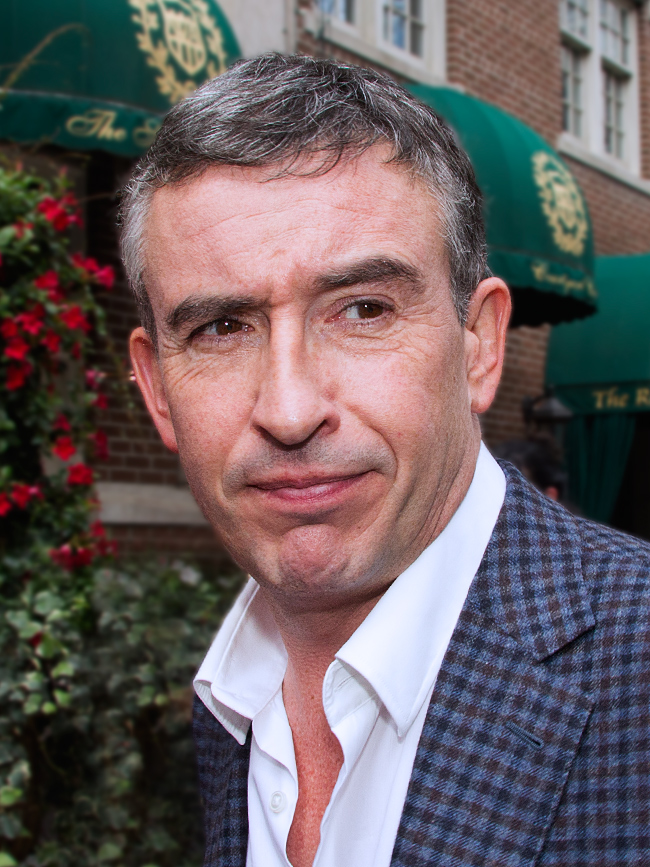
Steve Coogan, co-winner of the BAFTA for Best Adapted Screenplay

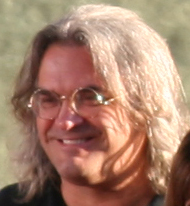
Paul Greengrass received multiple awards nominations for directing Captain Phillips.

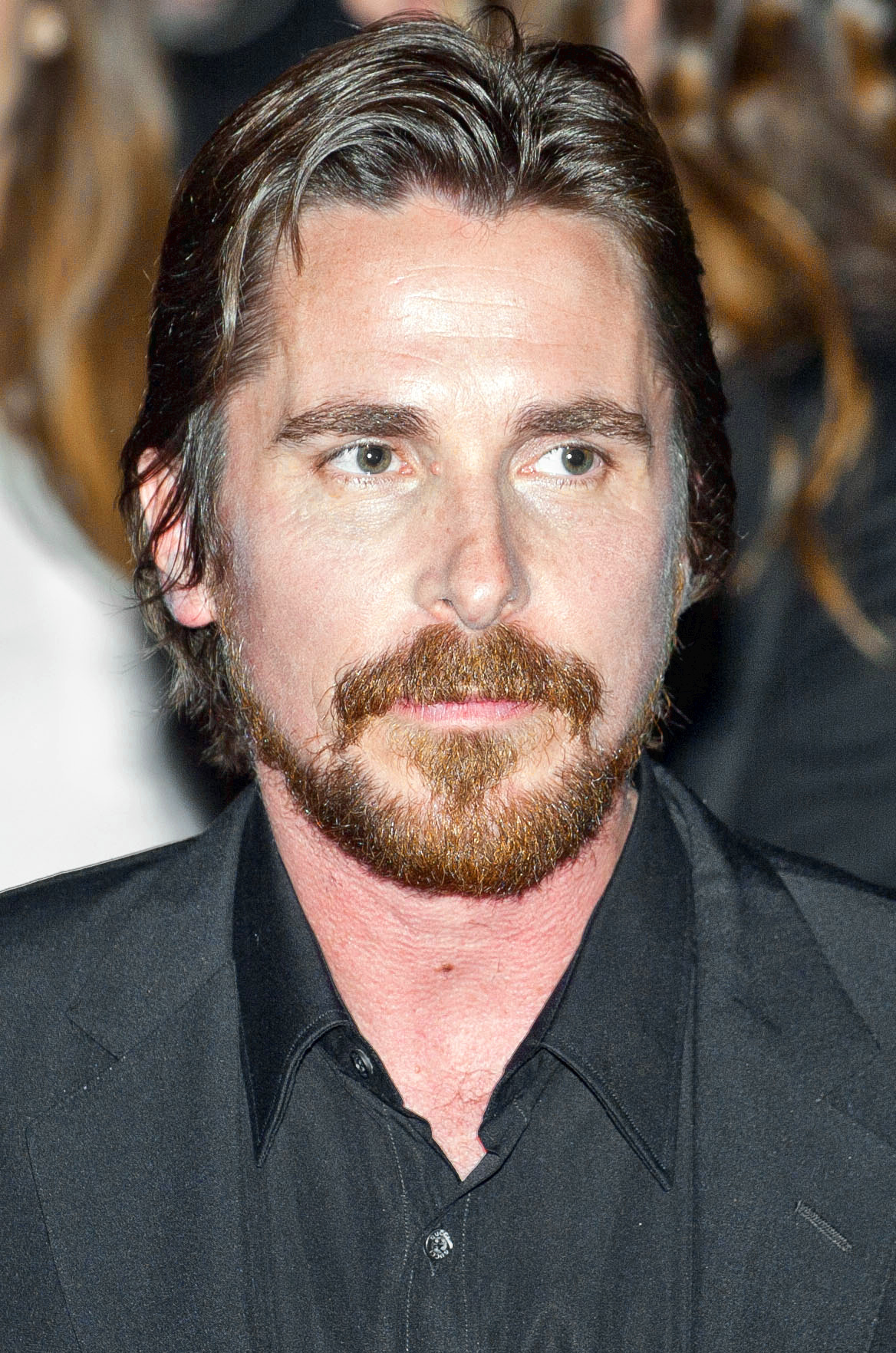
Christian Bale received multiple awards nominations for his portrayal of Irving Rosenfeld in American Hustle.

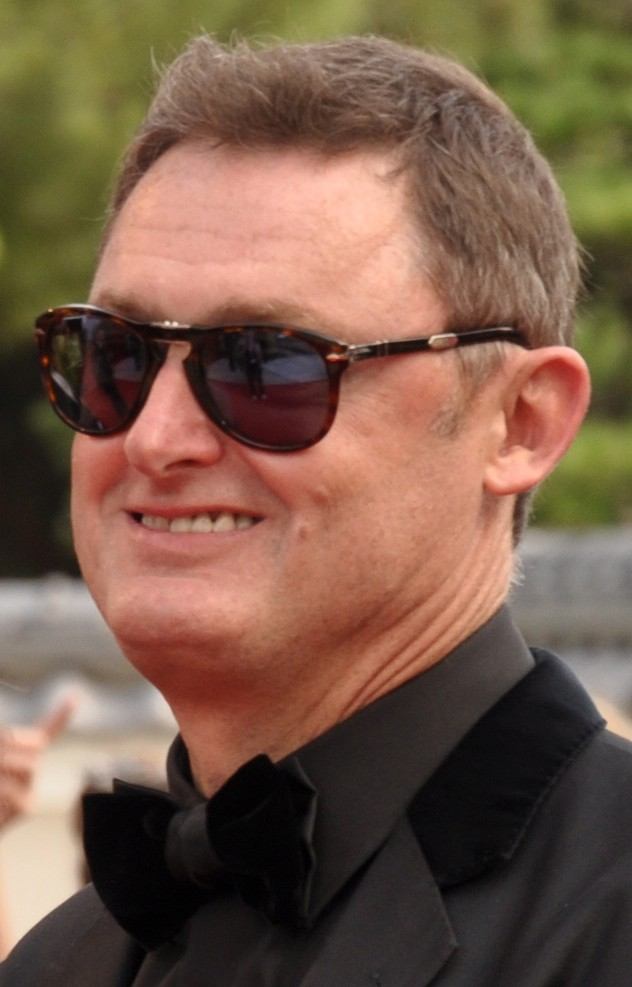
Jeff Pope, co-winner of the BAFTA for Best Adapted Screenplay

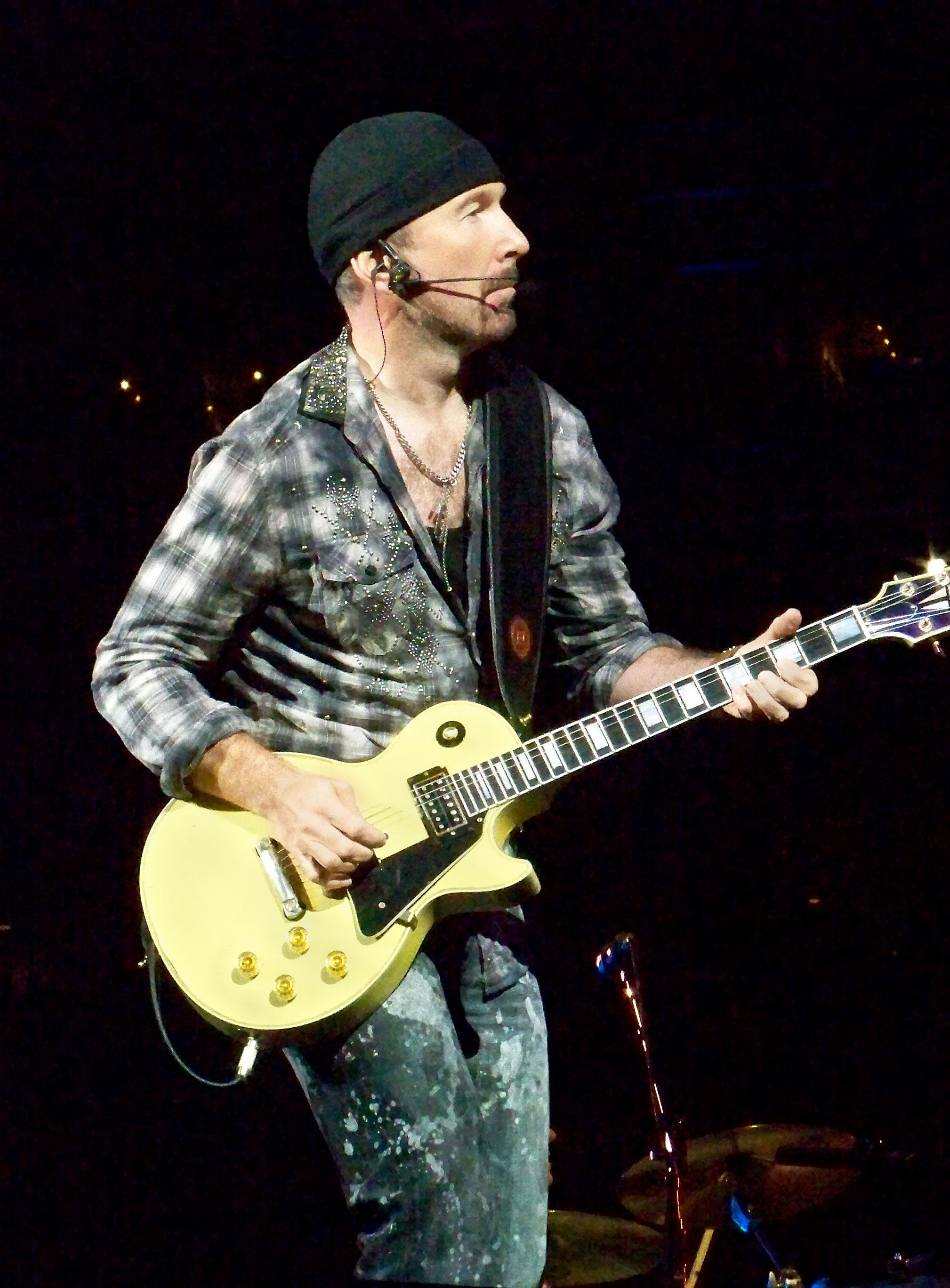
The band U2, two members of which are British-born, including The Edge (pictured), won the Golden Globe for Best Original Song for "Ordinary Love" from Mandela: Long Walk to Freedom.

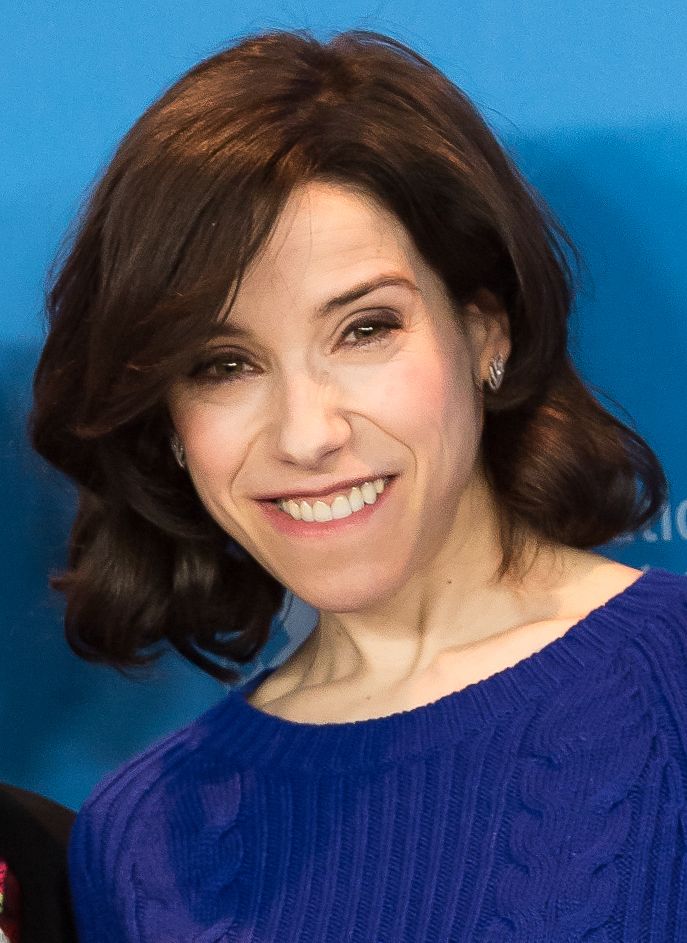
Sally Hawkins received multiple awards nominations for her portrayal of Ginger in Blue Jasmine.

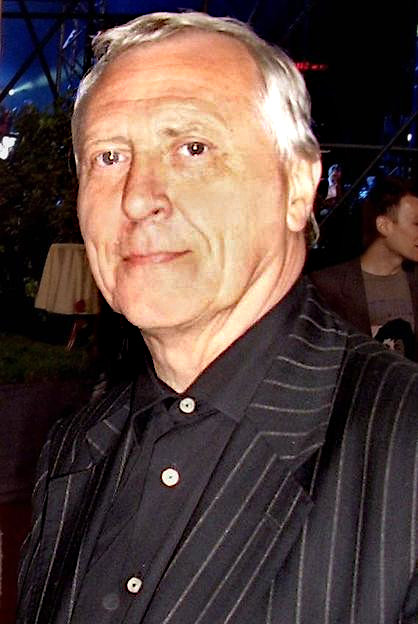
Peter Greenaway won the BAFTA for Outstanding British Contribution to Cinema.

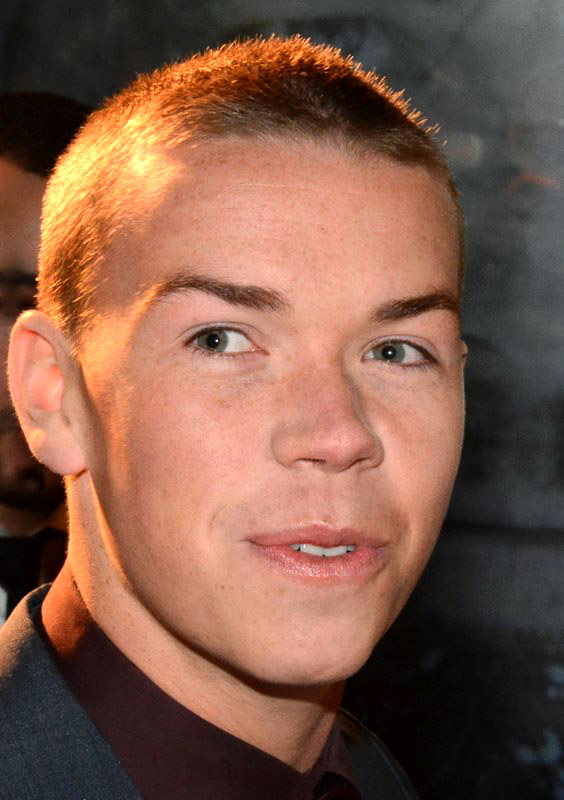
Will Poulter won the EE Rising Star Award.

=== Academy Awards ===
The 86th Academy Awards honoring the best films of 2013 were held on 2 March 2014.

British winners:

- 12 Years a Slave (Best Picture, Best Adapted Screenplay)
- Gravity (Best Director, Best Original Score, Best Sound Editing, Best Sound Mixing, Best Cinematography, Best Film Editing)
- The Lady in Number 6 (Best Documentary – Short Subject)
- Angela Lansbury (Academy Honorary Award)
- Chris Munro (Best Sound Mixing) - Gravity
- Glenn Freemantle (Best Sound Editing) - Gravity
- Malcolm Clarke (Best Documentary – Short Subject) - The Lady in Number 6
- Mark Sanger (Best Film Editing) - Gravity
- Neil Corbould (Best Visual Effects) - Gravity
- Nicholas Reed (Best Documentary – Short Subject) - The Lady in Number 6
- Steve McQueen (Best Picture) - 12 Years a Slave
- Steven Price (Best Original Score) - Gravity
- Tim Webber (Best Visual Effects) - Gravity

British nominations:

- 12 Years a Slave (Best Director, Best Actor, Best Supporting Actor, Best Supporting Actress, Best Production Design, Best Costume Design, Best Film Editing)
- Gravity (Best Picture, Best Production Design)
- Inside Llewyn Davis (Best Sound Mixing, Best Cinematography)
- Karama Has No Walls (Best Documentary – Short Subject)
- Mandela: Long Walk to Freedom (Best Original Song)
- Philomena (Best Picture, Best Actress, Best Adapted Screenplay, Best Original Score)
- Room on the Broom (Best Animated Short Film)
- Saving Mr. Banks (Best Original Score)
- The Act of Killing (Best Documentary – Feature)
- The Invisible Woman (Best Costume Design)
- The Square (Best Documentary – Feature)
- The Voorman Problem (Best Live Action Short Film)
- Adam Clayton (Best Original Song) - Mandela: Long Walk to Freedom
- Baldwin Li (Best Live Action Short Film) - The Voorman Problem
- Chiwetel Ejiofor (Best Actor) - 12 Years a Slave
- Chris Munro (Best Sound Mixing) - Captain Phillips
- Christian Bale (Best Actor) - American Hustle
- David Evans (Best Original Song) - Mandela: Long Walk to Freedom
- David Heyman (Best Picture) - Gravity
- Gabrielle Tana (Best Picture) - Philomena
- Jeff Pope (Best Adapted Screenplay) - Philomena
- Joanne Woollard (Best Production Design) - Gravity
- Joe Walker - 12 Years a Slave
- Judi Dench (Best Actress) - Philomena
- Mark Gill (Best Live Action Short Film) - The Voorman Problem
- Mark Taylor (Best Sound Mixing) - Captain Phillips
- Michael O'Connor (Best Costume Design) - The Invisible Woman
- Oliver Tarney (Best Sound Editing) - Captain Phillips
- Roger Deakins (Best Cinematography) - Prisoners
- Sally Hawkins (Best Supporting Actress) - Blue Jasmine
- Sara Ishaq (Best Documentary – Short Subject) - Karama Has No Walls
- Steve Coogan (Best Picture, Best Adapted Screenplay) - Philomena
- Steve McQueen (Best Director) - 12 Years a Slave
- Tracey Seaward (Best Picture) - Philomena

=== British Academy Film Awards ===
The 67th British Academy Film Awards took place on 16 February 2014.

British winners:

- 12 Years a Slave (Best Film, Best Actor in a Leading Role)
- Gravity (Best Director, Best Cinematography, Outstanding British Film, Best Original Music, Best Sound, Best Special Visual Effects)
- Kelly + Victor (Outstanding Debut by a British Writer, Director or Producer)
- Philomena (Best Adapted Screenplay)
- Rush (Best Editing)
- The Act of Killing (Best Documentary)
- Chiwetel Ejiofor (Best Actor in a Leading Role) - 12 Years a Slave
- Helen Mirren (Academy Fellowship)
- Jeff Pope (Best Adapted Screenplay) - Philomena
- Kieran Evans (Outstanding Debut by a British Writer, Director or Producer) - Kelly + Victor
- Peter Greenaway (Outstanding British Contribution to Cinema)
- Steve Coogan (Best Adapted Screenplay) - Philomena
- Steven Price (Best Original Music) - Gravity
- Will Poulter (EE Rising Star Award)

British nominations:

- 12 Years a Slave (Best Director, Best Actor in a Supporting Role, Best Actress in a Supporting Role, Best Adapted Screenplay, Best Cinematography, Best Original Music, Best Production Design, Best Editing)
- For Those in Peril (Outstanding Debut by a British Writer, Director or Producer)
- Good Vibrations (Outstanding Debut by a British Writer, Director or Producer)
- Gravity (Best Film, Best Actress in a Leading Role, Best Original Screenplay, Best Production Design, Best Editing)
- Inside Llewyn Davis (Best Original Screenplay, Best Cinematography, Best Sound)
- Mandela: Long Walk to Freedom (Outstanding British Film)
- Metro Manila (Best Film Not in the English Language)
- Shell (Outstanding Debut by a British Writer, Director or Producer)
- Philomena (Best Film, Best Actress in a Leading Role, Outstanding British Film)
- Rush (Best Actor in a Supporting Role, Outstanding British Film, Best Sound)
- Saving Mr. Banks (Best Actress in a Leading Role, Outstanding Debut by a British Writer, Director or Producer, Outstanding British Film, Best Original Music, Best Costume Design)
- The Act of Killing (Best Film Not in the English Language)
- The Invisible Woman (Best Costume Design)
- The Selfish Giant (Outstanding British Film)
- Barry Ackroyd (Best Cinematography) - Captain Phillips
- Christian Bale (Best Actor in a Leading Role) - American Hustle
- Colin Carberry (Outstanding Debut by a British Writer, Director or Producer) - Good Vibrations
- Emma Thompson (Best Actress in a Leading Role) - Saving Mr. Banks
- George MacKay (EE Rising Star Award)
- Henry Jackman (Best Original Music) - Captain Phillips
- Judi Dench (Best Actress in a Leading Role) - Philomena
- Kelly Marcel (Outstanding Debut by a British Writer, Director or Producer) - Saving Mr. Banks
- Paul Greengrass (Best Director) - Captain Phillips
- Paul Wright (Outstanding Debut by a British Writer, Director or Producer) - For Those in Peril
- Polly Stokes (Outstanding Debut by a British Writer, Director or Producer) - For Those in Peril
- Sally Hawkins (Best Actress in a Supporting Role) - Blue Jasmine
- Scott Graham (Outstanding Debut by a British Writer, Director or Producer) - Shell
- Sean Bobbitt (Best Cinematography) - 12 Years a Slave
- Steve McQueen (Best Director) - 12 Years a Slave

=== Critics' Choice Awards ===
The 19th Critics' Choice Awards took place on 16 January 2014.

British winners:

- 12 Years a Slave (Best Picture, Best Supporting Actress, Best Adapted Screenplay)
- Gravity (Best Director, Best Actress in an Action Movie, Best Sci-Fi/Horror Movie, Best Cinematography, Best Editing, Best Score, Best Visual Effects)
- Mark Sanger (Best Editing) - Gravity
- Steven Price (Best Score) - Gravity

British nominations:

- 12 Years a Slave (Best Director, Best Actor, Best Supporting Actor, Best Acting Ensemble, Best Art Direction, Best Cinematography, Best Editing, Best Makeup, Best Score)
- Gravity (Best Picture, Best Actress, Best Art Direction)
- Inside Llewyn Davis (Best Picture, Best Original Screenplay, Best Cinematography, Best Song)
- Philomena (Best Actress)
- Rush (Best Supporting Actor, Best Action Movie, Best Editing, Best Makeup)
- Saving Mr. Banks (Best Picture, Best Actress, Best Score)
- The Act of Killing (Best Documentary Feature)
- The World's End (Best Comedy, Best Actor in a Comedy)
- Adam Clayton (Best Original Song) - Mandela: Long Walk to Freedom
- Andy Nicholson (Best Art Direction) - Gravity
- Asa Butterfield (Best Young Actor/Actress) - Ender's Game
- Chiwetel Ejiofor (Best Actor) - 12 Years a Slave
- Chris Martin (Best Song) - The Hunger Games: Catching Fire
- Christian Bale (Best Actor, Best Actor in a Comedy) - American Hustle
- David Evans (Best Original Song) - Mandela: Long Walk to Freedom
- Emma Thompson (Best Actress) - Saving Mr. Banks
- Guy Berryman (Best Song) - The Hunger Games: Catching Fire
- Jeff Pope (Best Adapted Screenplay) - Philomena
- Joe Walker (Best Editing) - 12 Years a Slave
- Jonny Buckland (Best Song) - The Hunger Games: Catching Fire
- Judi Dench (Best Actress) - Philomena
- Paul Greengrass (Best Director) - Captain Phillips
- Roger Deakins (Best Cinematography) - Prisoners
- Sean Bobbitt (Best Cinematography) - 12 Years a Slave
- Simon Pegg (Best Actor in a Comedy) - The World's End
- Steve Coogan (Best Adapted Screenplay) - Philomena
- Steve McQueen (Best Director) - 12 Years a Slave
- Will Champion (Best Song) - The Hunger Games: Catching Fire

=== Golden Globe Awards ===
The 71st Golden Globe Awards were held on 12 January 2014.

British winners:

- 12 Years a Slave (Best Motion Picture – Drama)
- Gravity (Best Director)
- Adam Clayton (Best Original Song) - Mandela: Long Walk to Freedom
- David Evans (Best Original Song) - Mandela: Long Walk to Freedom

British nominations:

- 12 Years a Slave (Best Actor – Motion Picture Drama, Best Supporting Actor, Best Supporting Actress, Best Screenplay, Best Original Score)
- Gravity (Best Motion Picture – Drama, Best Actress – Motion Picture Drama, Best Original Score)
- Inside Llewyn Davis (Best Motion Picture – Musical or Comedy, Best Actor – Motion Picture Musical or Comedy, Best Original Song)
- Mandela: Long Walk to Freedom (Best Actor – Motion Picture Drama, Best Original Score)
- One Chance (Best Original Song)
- Philomena (Best Motion Picture – Drama, Best Actress – Motion Picture Drama)
- Rush (Best Motion Picture – Drama, Best Supporting Actor)
- Saving Mr. Banks (Best Actress – Motion Picture Drama)
- Adam Clayton (Best Original Song) - Mandela: Long Walk to Freedom
- Alex Heffes (Best Original Score) - Mandela: Long Walk to Freedom
- Chiwetel Ejiofor (Best Actor – Motion Picture Drama) - 12 Years a Slave
- Chris Martin (Best Original Song) - The Hunger Games: Catching Fire
- David Evans (Best Original Song) - Mandela: Long Walk to Freedom
- Emma Thompson (Best Actress – Motion Picture Drama) - Saving Mr. Banks
- Guy Berryman (Best Original Song) - The Hunger Games: Catching Fire
- Idris Elba (Best Actor – Motion Picture Drama) - Mandela: Long Walk to Freedom
- Jeff Pope (Best Screenplay) - Philomena
- Jonny Buckland (Best Original Song) - The Hunger Games: Catching Fire
- Judi Dench (Best Actress – Motion Picture Drama) - Philomena
- Kate Winslet (Best Actress – Motion Picture Drama) - Labor Day
- Sally Hawkins (Best Supporting Actress) - Blue Jasmine
- Steve Coogan (Best Screenplay) - Philomena
- Steven Price (Best Original Score) - Gravity
- Will Champion (Best Original Song) - The Hunger Games: Catching Fire

=== Screen Actors Guild Awards ===
The 20th Screen Actors Guild Awards were held on 18 January 2014.

British winners:

- 12 Years a Slave (Outstanding Performance by a Female Actor in a Supporting Role)
- Christian Bale (Outstanding Performance by a Cast in a Motion Picture) - American Hustle
- Jack Huston (Outstanding Performance by a Cast in a Motion Picture) - American Hustle

British nominations:

- 12 Years a Slave (Outstanding Performance by a Male Actor in a Leading Role, Outstanding Performance by a Male Actor in a Supporting Role, Outstanding Performance by a Cast in a Motion Picture)
- Gravity (Outstanding Performance by a Female Actor in a Leading Role)
- Philomena (Outstanding Performance by a Female Actor in a Leading Role)
- Rush (Outstanding Performance by a Male Actor in a Supporting Role, Outstanding Performance by a Stunt Ensemble in a Motion Picture)
- Saving Mr. Banks (Outstanding Performance by a Female Actor in a Leading Role)
- Alan Rickman (Outstanding Performance by a Cast in a Motion Picture) - The Butler
- Alex Pettyfer (Outstanding Performance by a Cast in a Motion Picture) - The Butler
- Benedict Cumberbatch (Outstanding Performance by a Cast in a Motion Picture) - 12 Years a Slave, August: Osage County
- Chiwetel Ejiofor (Outstanding Performance by a Male Actor in a Leading Role, Outstanding Performance by a Cast in a Motion Picture) - 12 Years a Slave
- David Oyelowo (Outstanding Performance by a Cast in a Motion Picture) - The Butler
- Emma Thompson (Outstanding Performance by a Female Actor in a Leading Role) - Saving Mr. Banks
- Judi Dench (Outstanding Performance by a Female Actor in a Leading Role) - Philomena
- Vanessa Redgrave (Outstanding Performance by a Cast in a Motion Picture) - The Butler

== Notable deaths ==
Month	Date	Name	Age	Nationality	Profession	Notable films
January	1	Billy McColl	62	Scottish-English	Actor	Death Defying Acts; Soft Top Hard Shoulder
January	11	Jerome Willis	85	English	Actor	Perfume: The Story of a Murderer; Khartoum
January	12	Alexandra Bastedo	67	English	Actress	Batman Begins; Casino Royale
January	12	John Horsley	93	English	Actor	Ben-Hur; Where the Bullets Fly
January	15	Roger Lloyd-Pack	69	English	Actor	Harry Potter and the Goblet of Fire; Tinker Tailor Soldier Spy
January	18	Sarah Marshall	80	English-American	Actress	Dangerous Minds; Dave
January	19	Gordon Hessler	88	German-English	Director, producer, screenwriter	The Oblong Box; The Girl in a Swing
January	24	Lisa Daniely	84	English	Actress	The Vicious Circle; The Man in the Road
January	26	Margery Mason	100	English	Actress	The Princess Bride; Harry Potter and the Goblet of Fire
February	13	Ken Jones	83	English	Actor	Porridge; Jude
February	15	Christopher Malcolm	67	Scottish	Actor	The Empire Strikes Back; Superman III
February	18	Malcolm Tierney	75	English	Actor	Star Wars; Braveheart
March	6	Sheila MacRae	93	English-American	Actress	Caged; Backfire
March	8	James Ellis	82	Irish-English	Actor	Where the Bullets Fly; Conspiracy of Silence
March	17	Oswald Morris	98	English	Cinematographer	Fiddler on the Roof; The Wiz
March	27	Derek Martinus	82	English	Actor, director	Carry On Sergeant
March	30	Kate O'Mara	74	English	Actress	The Vampire Lovers; The Horror of Frankenstein
April	7	Perlita Neilson	80	English	Actress	The Story of Gilbert and Sullivan; Trouble in Store
April	11	Edna Doré	92	English	Actress	Les Misérables; Another Year
April	14	Ingeborg von Kusserow	95	German-English	Actress	Captain Horatio Hornblower R.N.; Across the Bridge
April	17	Anthony Marriott	83	English	Screenwriter	No Sex Please, We're British; The Deadly Bees
April	29	Bob Hoskins	71	English	Actor, director	Who Framed Roger Rabbit; Hook
May	1	Eli Woods	91	English	Actor	A Private Function; Little Dorrit
May	6	Antony Hopkins	93	English	Composer, conductor	The Huggetts; Billy Budd
May	20	Barbara Murray	84	English	Actress	Passport to Pimlico; Operation Bullshine
June	4	Neal Arden	104	English	Actor	"Pimpernel" Smith; The Third Secret
June	4	Cliff Severn	88	English-American	Actor	A Christmas Carol; How Green Was My Valley
June	9	Rik Mayall	56	English	Actor	An American Werewolf in London; Valiant
June	14	Sam Kelly	70	English	Actor	Nanny McPhee and the Big Bang; Carry On Dick
June	14	Francis Matthews	86	English	Actor	Dracula: Prince of Darkness; The Revenge of Frankenstein
June	14	Terry Richards	81	English	Actor, stuntman	Indiana Jones; James Bond
June	17	Patsy Byrne	80	English	Actress	Les Misérables; Kevin & Perry Go Large
June	17	Jeffry Wickham	80	English	Actor	The Remains of the Day; Before Winter Comes
July	4	Paul Apted	47	English-American	Sound Editor	Alice in Wonderland; The Chronicles of Narnia: The Voyage of the Dawn Treader
July	6	Dave Bickers	76	English	Stuntman	Octopussy; Indiana Jones and the Last Crusade
July	6	Dave Legeno	50	English	Actor	Harry Potter; Batman Begins
July	9	Ken Thorne	90	English-American	Composer	Superman II; A Funny Thing Happened on the Way to the Forum
July	11	Ray Lonnen	74	English	Actor	Zeppelin; Ginger & Rosa
July	23	Dora Bryan	91	English	Actress	Carry On Sergeant; A Taste of Honey
July	31	Kenny Ireland	68	Scottish	Actor	Local Hero; The Dogs of War
August	8	Charles Keating	72	English-American	Actor	The Bodyguard; Deuce Bigalow: European Gigolo
August	19	Tom Pevsner	87	German-English	Producer, production manager	James Bond; Dracula
August	24	Richard Attenborough	90	English	Actor, director, producer	Jurassic Park; Miracle on 34th Street
August	30	Andrew V. McLaglen	94	English-American	Director, producer	Fools' Parade; McLintock!
September	8	Jane Baker	80	English	Screenwriter	Captain Nemo and the Underwater City; Night of the Big Heat
September	9	Howell Evans	86	Welsh	Actor	The Ipcress File; Mr. Nice
September	11	Donald Sinden	90	English	Actor	Balto; The Cruel Sea
September	12	John Bardon	75	English	Actor	Clockwise; Fierce Creatures
September	14	Assheton Gorton	84	English-Welsh	Production designer	101 Dalmatians; The French Lieutenant's Woman
September	14	Angus Lennie	84	Scottish-English	Actor	The Great Escape; Oh! What a Lovely War
September	30	Ralph Cosham	78	English-American	Actor	The Pelican Brief; Starman
October	9	Victor Winding	85	English-Welsh	Actor	Frightmare; The Medusa Touch
October	19	Lynda Bellingham	66	Canadian-English	Actress	Sweeney!; Confessions of a Driving Instructor
October	26	Michael Hawkins	85	English	Actor	The Hound of the Baskervilles; Torture Garden
October	30	Renée Asherson	99	English	Actress	The Others; Caesar and Cleopatra
October	31	Ian Fraser	81	English-American	Composer, conductor	Scrooge; The Secret of NIMH
November	12	Warren Clarke	67	English	Actor	A Clockwork Orange; Top Secret!
November	12	Richard Pasco	88	English	Actor	Yesterday's Enemy; Rasputin the Mad Monk
November	22	Derek Deadman	74	English	Actor	Time Bandits; Brazil
November	25	Joanna Dunham	78	English	Actress	The Greatest Story Ever Told; The House That Dripped Blood
December	2	Gerry Fisher	88	English	Cinematographer	The Exorcist III; Aces High
December	11	Tom Adams	76	English	Actor	The Great Escape; Licensed to Kill
December	18	Mandy Rice-Davies	70	Welsh-English	Actress	Absolute Beginners; Hide and Seek
December	21	Billie Whitelaw	82	English	Actress	The Omen; The Dark Crystal
December	22	Richard Graydon	92	English	Actor, stuntman	James Bond; Batman
December	23	Mike Elliott	68	English	Actor	Billy Elliot; Goal!
December	23	Jeremy Lloyd	84	English	Actor, screenwriter	Are You Being Served?; Help!
December	25	David Ryall	79	English	Actor	Harry Potter and the Deathly Hallows – Part 1; Around the World in 80 Days
December	25	Bernard Kay	86	English	Actor	Doctor Zhivago; Carry On Sergeant
December	27	Bridget Turner	75	English	Actress	Under Milk Wood; The Walking Stick
December	30	Yolande Donlan	94	American-English	Actress	Tarzan and the Lost Safari; Penny Princess
December	30	Patrick Gowers	78	English	Composer	Hamlet; The Boy Who Turned Yellow
December	30	Luise Rainer	104	German-English	Actress	The Great Ziegfeld; The Good Earth

== See also ==
- 2014 in film
- 2014 in British music
- 2014 in British radio
- 2014 in British television
- 2014 in the United Kingdom
- Cinema of the United Kingdom
- List of 2014 box office number-one films in the United Kingdom
- List of British submissions for the Academy Award for Best Foreign Language Film
- List of British films of 2013
- List of British films of 2015
