= Candlestick (disambiguation) =

A candlestick is a decorative holder for one or more candles.

Candlestick may also refer to:

- Candlestick chart, a type of chart showing price movements of an item (e.g. equities) over a period of time
- Candlestick Park, a stadium in San Francisco
- Candlestick telephone, a style of telephone common in the early 20th century
- Candlestick (film), a thriller released in 2015
- Seven-Branch Candlestick, the Jewish Temple menorah

== See also ==
- Candle holder (disambiguation)
- Triple candlestick (disambiguation)
