= The Rendlesham UFO Incident =

2014 British horror film by Daniel Simpson

- Film poster
- Directed by: Daniel Simpson
- Written by: Daniel Simpson; Adam Preston
- Produced by: Laurie Cook; Jason Newmark; Will Clarke; Paul Higgins
- Starring: Danny Shayler; Abbie Salt; Robert Curtis
- Cinematography: Daniel Simpson
- Edited by: Andrew Hulme; Masa Skalec
- Production company: Newscope Films
- Release dates: 22 October 2014 (CFF); 9 February 2015 (UK)
- Running time: 87 minutes
- Country: United Kingdom
- Language: English

The Rendlesham UFO Incident (released in the US as Hangar 10) is a 2014 British horror film directed by Daniel Simpson. It stars Danny Shayler, Abbie Salt, and Robert Curtis as three friends who become lost in the Rendlesham Forest and discover evidence of UFO activity, decades after the Rendlesham Forest incident. It premiered at the Colchester Film Festival on 22 October 2014 and was released in the UK on 9 February 2015. It is shot in the style of found footage.

== Plot ==
A message indicates that the following amateur footage was recovered from a stolen laptop. Gus, a metal detector enthusiast, takes his girlfriend Sally and her videographer friend Jake with him to search for buried treasure in Suffolk, England. Gus discourages them from taking many supplies, as they will not be gone long. As Gus describes the various metal detector models and history behind the hobby, Jake expresses more interest in filming Sally. When they stop in a local pub, Jake flirts with Sally and asks if she is truly serious with Gus; she replies that she is. Jake points out a newspaper that describes the Rendlesham Forest incident and says that is why he is interested in exploring the area.

As they drive to their first site, they see dead horses by the side of the road. Their initial searches come up empty, and the trio move on to a private property whose owner they had previously contacted. The owner is nowhere to be found when they arrive at his house. Undeterred, Gus insists they prospect on his land without permission. Jake agrees despite his misgivings, and the three wait until nightfall to begin. When Gus takes a nap, Sally and Jake discuss their history, and Jake teases her over a drunken kiss that she would rather forget. Gus later leaves a message for Jake on his camera in which he tells Jake that he is aware of Jake's crush on Sally.

In the Rendlesham Forest, the three hear strange noises and encounter otherworldly lights. Gus, a skeptic, rejects paranormal explanations and suggests that it is local kids playing a prank. Sally and Jake counter that it could not have been controlled by humans. When Gus notices low-flying jets, he says that they saw experimental Ministry of Defence drones. When the others ask how he could know this, he admits that he has knowingly brought them onto MoD land illegally. Tensions are further heightened when their car disappears and they find a shack that contains surveillance pictures of them. Military aircraft continue to fly over them, and one helicopter crashes.

Now concerned for their safety, the three begin panicking. Gus leads them via his GPS device, but they never encounter the road. Gus becomes sullen and quiet, and Jake takes them deeper into the forest, hoping to emerge from it after following a straight line. After another encounter with the strange lights, Jake and Sally lose Gus. Jake convinces her that they can best help Gus by bringing back a search party. Soon after, they encounter a road. Overjoyed, they follow it to a seemingly abandoned American Air Force base. As they explore it, they find evidence that it was involved in the 1980 UFO incident. In a hangar, Jake and Sally are surprised to see Gus on a surveillance camera and rush to find him.

Following loud, unearthly noises from deeper within the hangar, they encounter a UFO as it prepares to lift off. As Jake yells incoherently at it, Sally explores an adjoining room, where she finds Gus' body amidst several others. Jake and Sally flee the base as the UFO rises, only to be confronted by several more UFOs outside the base, each of which is making the same unearthly noises. As Jake surveys the skies, Sally screams and collapses. Jake runs over to her as several helicopters fly around the UFOs. After checking her body, he tearfully apologises to her, climbs a hill, and raises his arms to the UFOs. He is bathed in a white light and disappears.

== Cast ==
- Danny Shayler as Jake
- Abbie Salt as Sally
- Robert Curtis as Gus

== Production ==
Production took place over three and a half years. Two years were spent filming on location in Rendlesham Forest.

== Release ==
Hangar 10 premiered at the Colchester Film Festival on 22 October 2014. It was released in the US on 7 November 2014 and in the UK on 9 February 2015. It was released on DVD in the US on 1 September 2015.

== Reception ==
On review aggregator Rotten Tomatoes, the film holds an approval rating of 14% based on 7 reviews, with an average rating of 3.69/10. On Metacritic, the film has a weighted average score of 28 out of 100, based on 5 critics, indicating "generally unfavorable reviews". Kim Newman of Empire rated it 2/5 stars and wrote, "It has a few okay chills but treads a too familiar path." Tom Huddleston of Time Out London rated it 2/5 stars and wrote, "But overall this is dull, derivative, murky stuff, full of running and shouting but never really going anywhere." Frank Scheck of The Hollywood Reporter wrote that it "misses nary a single cliché in its visually disorienting and narratively confusing proceedings". Film Journal International wrote that it "breaks no new ground but delivers some creepy moments". Jeannette Catsoulis of The New York Times wrote it "struggles to build a science-fiction movie from little more than a ghost of an idea and an infamous location". Alan Scherstuhl of The Village Voice wrote that the climax "is legitimately creepy and impressive once it finally comes", but criticised the film's use of the found footage gimmick, which he called ridiculous. Describing the film's similarity to The Blair Witch Project, Drew Hunt of Slant Magazine rated it 1.5/4 stars and wrote, "it's easy to see how Simpson's desire to return the found-footage genre to its roots resulted in cheap imitation". Matt Boiselle of Dread Central rated it 1.5/5 stars and wrote that the UFO visuals were the only good part.

== See also ==
- List of British films of 2014
