= Candle holder =

Candle holder or candleholder may refer to:

- Candlestick, a small device using a cup or spike to hold a candle in place
- Sconce (light fixture), a fixture attached to a wall that holds a candle or lamp
- Candelabra, a decoration holding candles on multiple arms
- Chandelier, a branched ornamental light fixture designed to be mounted on ceilings or walls
- Torchère, a lamp with a tall stand of wood or metal
- Julleuchter, a type of earthenware candle-holder originating in 16th-century Sweden, later redesigned and manufactured in Nazi Germany
- Ljuskrona, a Swedish term for chandelier
- Girandole, an ornamental branched candlestick or light fixture consisting of several lights, often resembling a small chandelier
- Candleholder liveforever, a species of succulent plant

== See also ==
- Candlestick (disambiguation)
- Triple candlestick (disambiguation)
