= Triple candlestick =

Triple candlestick may refer to:

- A general form of candlestick
- Triple candlestick (Catholic Church), a triple candlestick used in Catholic liturgy
- Trikirion, a triple candlestick used in Eastern Orthodox and Byzantine Catholic liturgy
  - Paschal trikirion, a trikirion only used for Easter
- A candelabra with three branches
- Some complex candlestick patterns, in financial analysis

== See also ==
- Altar candle
- Candle holder (disambiguation)
- Candlestick (disambiguation)
