= Treehouse (film) =

- Official release poster
- Directed by: Michael Bartlett
- Written by: Alex Child; Miles Harrington
- Produced by: Martin Myers; Andy W. Meyer; Michael Guy Ellis
- Starring: J. Michael Trautmann; Dana Melanie; Daniel Fredrick; Clint James
- Cinematography: J. Christopher Campbell
- Edited by: Justin Cardoza
- Music by: Justin Cardoza
- Production company: Aunt Max Entertainment
- Distributed by: Uncork'd Entertainment
- Release date: October 20, 2014 (UK DVD)
- Running time: 98 minutes
- Country: United States
- Language: English

Treehouse is a 2014 American horror film directed by Michael Bartlett, written by Alex Child and Miles Harrington, and starring J. Michael Trautmann, Dana Melanie, Daniel Fredrick, and Clint James. Teens attempt to escape a treehouse back to the safety of their town after going out after a curfew.

== Plot ==
On the outskirts of a small town, a teenage girl named Elizabeth returns home one day to find that her house has been broken into and her younger brother, Little Bob, has been abducted. She chases the kidnappers into the woods with a rifle, but fails to catch up with them when she steps on broken glass and hurts her foot. Elizabeth and Bob are both declared missing and a curfew is set for the youth of the town.

Killian, a teenage boy in town, is frequently bullied, and is defended by his older brother, Crawford. They live with their Aunt Marsha after their father, an abusive traumatized war veteran, died, and their mother’s health deteriorated significantly. One weekend, while Marsha is away, Crawford persuades Killian to join him and his friends in the woods for a party.

The brothers arrive in the woods in the evening, only to realize that they ended up in a different place from Crawford’s friends. Crawford spies an old treehouse high up in a tree and convinces Killian to climb up with him, where they discover a shaken Elizabeth. Killian recognizes her as one of the missing people, and she hastily explains that there are creatures in the woods and they’re searching for her. She says that she managed to escape them by climbing into the treehouse, and they haven’t found her yet.

Crawford agrees to go and get help, with Killian refusing to leave Elizabeth alone. After Crawford leaves, Killian makes contact with Crawford’s girlfriend Arielle and her friends via a walkie-talkie, who reveal that they are waiting for them and believe Crawford stood them up. Killian urges them to flee, but they do not take him seriously, and are attacked by the unseen creatures. Arielle escapes while her friends are killed, and manages to tell Killian that Crawford’s bike wasn’t there when they arrived, before she is found and killed by one of the creatures.

Killian and Elizabeth reason that Crawford must have made it to the bike and escaped, and try to wait for him. But as the food runs low and Elizabeth continues to bleed from her foot, they accept that they’ll have to try to escape. The creatures taunt them by hanging the bodies of Crawford’s friends from trees, and hoarsely calling Killian’s name to him as he investigates their surroundings. He spies smoke coming from the distance, and they decide to head that way.

Killian and Elizabeth descend the tree and try to make their way through the woods at night, Killian almost stepping in a bear trap, but Elizabeth passes out from low blood sugar. In the morning, Killian carries her toward the smoke, where they find an empty house. Elizabeth replenishes herself before they each search the property for a means of communication. Elizabeth discovers a rotting corpse in the bedroom, while Killian finds a burned body on a cross, who Killian identifies as Crawford.

Three men arrive at the house, one riding Crawford’s bike, and Killian hides. Elizabeth hides as well, after finding photos of the men posing with her little brother’s body. The men are implied to be the psychotic sons of the dead woman in the bedroom, and have been posing as monsters this entire time. They find Killian and are about to kill him, when Elizabeth intervenes. She is knocked unconscious while the men pursue Killian.

Killian manages to kill the medium brother before the large brother attacks him. Killian throws a knife into his chest, but the man survives as Killian flees and reunites with Elizabeth, who are then pursued by the small brother. Dashing onto the road, Killian and Elizabeth accidentally cause a police officer to crash his truck and die. They use the officer’s pistol to kill the small brother, leaving only the large one.

Killian and Elizabeth grieve over their siblings’ deaths and kiss, then discover a pair of assault rifles in the trunk of the police truck. They decide to find and take revenge on the large brother, regardless of whether or not they’re locked up for murder afterward. The film ends with each of them taking a rifle and heading back into the woods to exact vengeance.

== Cast ==
- J. Michael Trautmann as Killian
- Dana Melanie as Elizabeth
- Daniel Fredrick as Crawford
- Clint James as Killian's father
- Victoria Spencer Smith as Killian's mom
- Nick Herra as The Tall One
- Shannon Knopke as Marsha
- Darren Kennedy as Officer Morgan
- Caleb Cox as Tyler

== Production ==
Bartlett, a native of the UK, moved to Missouri, where he shot Treehouse. Bartlett said that he was attracted to the script due to its atmosphere and originality. Bartlett did a complete rewrite after optioning the script. Elizabeth was based on his own wife. The initial budget was $1 million, and they worked to decrease costs below that. The shoot was planned to last 19 days. Impressed with The Signal and its fast shooting schedule, Bartlett sought out that film's director of photography, but unforeseen circumstances, including an influenza outbreak, caused shooting to extend to 30 days. Bartlett and original scriptwriter Child were heavily involved in casting.

== Release ==
The theatrical premiere was at the St. Louis International Film Festival on November 16, 2014. After technical issues with the film's screening, Bartlett told the audience that they should illegally download the film from the Internet in order to get their money's worth. It was released on DVD in the UK on October 20, 2014, and on video on demand on February 20, 2015. It also played in Los Angeles on the same date.

== Reception ==
Gary Goldstein of the Los Angeles Times called it "a lackluster backwoods thriller" lacks the tension of Jeopardy!. Dan Gvozden of LA Weekly said that the film initially builds suspense but ultimately unravels due to the characters' "cringe-worthy dialogue" and "unlikely decisions mandated by plot rather than character". Ryan Pollard of Starburst rated it 8/10 stars and wrote, "In the end, while there are inadequate faults with the script and some ungainly performances, Treehouse overcomes its flaws with its core aesthetic, visceral atmosphere, Dana Melanie's towering performance, and ultimately delivering on its promise to scare the pants off you." Michael Gingold of Fangoria rated it 2.5/4 stars and criticized Bartlett's rewrite of the script as changing the film's tone and contradicting what has gone on before, though he praised the film's tension. Patrick Cooper of Bloody Disgusting rated it 3.5/5 stars and called it "a brooding, atmospheric thriller that works on a lot of levels". Scott Hallam of Dread Central rated it 3.5/5 stars and wrote, "If you're looking for a tense and creepy night at the movies, give Treehouse a look."

== See also ==
- 2014 in film
- List of American films of 2014
- List of British films of 2014
- Treehouse (Into the Dark) 2019
