= Wasteland (2013 film) =

- Film poster
- Directed by: Tom Wadlow
- Written by: Tommy Draper
- Produced by: Chrissa Maund
- Starring
- Cinematography: Chris Newman
- Edited by: Chris Newman; Tom Wadlow
- Music by: Dave S. Walker
- Production company: Light Films
- Distributed by: Gravitas Ventures (US); Maritim Pictures (Germany)
- Release date: 16 November 2013 (Festival of Zombie Culture)
- Running time: 92 minutes
- Country: United Kingdom
- Language: English

Wasteland is a 2013 zombie horror film directed by Tom Wadlow and written by Tommy Draper. The film was released 23 October 2013 in France and was released to DVD in the United States and Germany, through Midnight Releasing and Maritim Pictures, respectively.

== Plot summary ==
Scott Miller (Shameer Seepersand) is one of the lone survivors of an apocalyptic world where the undead have overtaken the earth. He had previously sequestered himself away with his girlfriend Beth (Jessica Messenger), however she left him one night in order to see if her family was still alive. Scott's only other human interaction has come via radio communications with a couple hidden away elsewhere, but they're eventually overtaken by zombies, leaving him truly alone. Things seem to be looking up when Beth returns, however when they meet two more uninfected people their problems become even more complex.

== Cast ==
- Shameer Seepersand as Scott
- Jessica Messenger as Beth
- Mark Drake as Max
- Rachel Benson as Lolli
- Gavin Harrison as George
- Carl Bryan as Dave

== Production ==
Shooting took place in Derby, England. The film was partially inspired by the 2011 England riots, which occurred while the screenplay was being written. Post-production was reported to be underway in January 2013.

== Release ==
Wasteland premiered at the Festival of Zombie Culture on 16 November 2013. It was released in the US on DVD in September 2015.

== Reception ==
HorrorNews.net initially disliked the film upon their first viewing, but upon seeing it a second time they felt that it was "definitely not an exciting, action-packed, zombie flick. It is a slow burn of a film that explores the end-of-the-world questions". Ain't It Cool News gave the film a positive review and also commented upon the film's nature, writing "If you’re looking for an action packed zombie romp, this ain’t it. But WASTELAND has a lot of soul and is quite gripping in the tragic and lonely tale it tells." Horror Society rated it 3/5 stars and wrote, "Overall, Wasteland is a solid film that is far from original and not as bloody as one would expect from a zombie flick."
