= Little Happiness =

2014 film

- Film poster
- Directed by: Nihat Seven
- Written by: Nihat Seven
- Starring: Mehtap Anil
- Release date: 16 February 2014 (Turkey)
- Running time: 116 minutes
- Countries: United Kingdom; Turkey
- Language: Turkish

Little Happiness (Turkish: Uzun Yol) is a 2014 British-Turkish drama film directed by Nihat Seven. It was selected as the British entry for the Best Foreign Language Film at the 87th Academy Awards, but was not nominated.

== Cast ==
- Mehtap Anil as Esma
- Derin Bebek as Ferhat baby 2
- Bora Cengiz as Murat
- Nil Günal as Gulten
- Murat Muslu as Selim / Kemal
- Ahmet Ozarslan as Salih
- Atilla Pekoz as Tekin
- Nejat Sarp as Ferhat baby 1
- Erdogan Tutkun as Accountant
- Erdem Yilmaz as Rifat
- Hakan Yufkacigil as Fariz

== See also ==
- List of submissions to the 87th Academy Awards for Best Foreign Language Film
- List of British submissions for the Academy Award for Best Foreign Language Film
