= Candlestick (film) =

2014 film

- Poster
- Directed by: Christopher Presswell
- Written by: Forgács W. András; Christopher Presswell
- Starring: Andrew Fitch; Isla Ure; Nigel Thomas; Tom Knight
- Cinematography: Haider Zafar
- Music by: Jonathan Armandary
- Production company: Workbus
- Distributed by: Indie Rights
- Release dates: 14 October 2014 (IndieCork Film Festival); 11 April 2015 (United States)
- Running time: 83 minutes
- Country: United Kingdom
- Language: English

Candlestick is a 2014 British film starring Andrew Fitch, Isla Ure, Nigel Thomas and Tom Knight. It was directed by Christopher Presswell and was released in the United States on 11 April 2015.

== Plot ==
A meeting of friends descends into a sinister game when one of them accuses the wife of his best friend of infidelity.

== Cast ==
- Andrew Fitch as Jack
- Isla Ure as Vera
- Nigel Thomas as Frank
- Tom Knight as Major Burns
- Dan March as Inspector Marcus Evans

== Production ==
The film was shot in London during November 2012. Presswell has cited the work of Alfred Hitchcock, particularly Rope and Dial M for Murder, as an influence on the film.

== Release ==
Candlestick made its UK debut on 8 October 2014 at the Aberdeen Film Festival, with further festival screenings at IndieCork, South African Horrorfest and the Bratislava International Film Festival.

In November 2014, Candlestick opened the 30 Dies Fantastic Film Festival in Andorra, and was among the first non-Chinese-language films shown at the Europe China Image Film Festival.

In January 2015 the company announced that the film would open in the United States on 11 April of that year, and be released on VOD, DVD and Blu-ray.

== Reception ==
Following the film's Irish première, NextProjection called the film a "juicy jaunt of a tale," and said that "like a Raymond Chandler 'cannibalisation', Candlestick may feed off the familiar, but it's the sport with which it spits it back out that makes it feel so fresh".

The film won three awards at the 30 Dies Fantastic Film Festival, Andorra: best screenplay (Forgács W. András and Christopher Presswell); best original score (Jonathan Armandary); and best actor, shared by Andrew Fitch, Isla Ure, Nigel Thomas and Tom Knight.

The film received a mention for its screenplay at the Overlook: CinemAvvenire Film Festival 2014 in Rome.

== Publicity ==
On 19 November 2015 a post on titled "This is how movies are delivered to your local theater" containing pictures of the film's DCP hard drive went viral, reaching the #1 spot on Reddit, and gathering widespread social media attention.
