= Josh O'Connor =

English actor (born 1990)

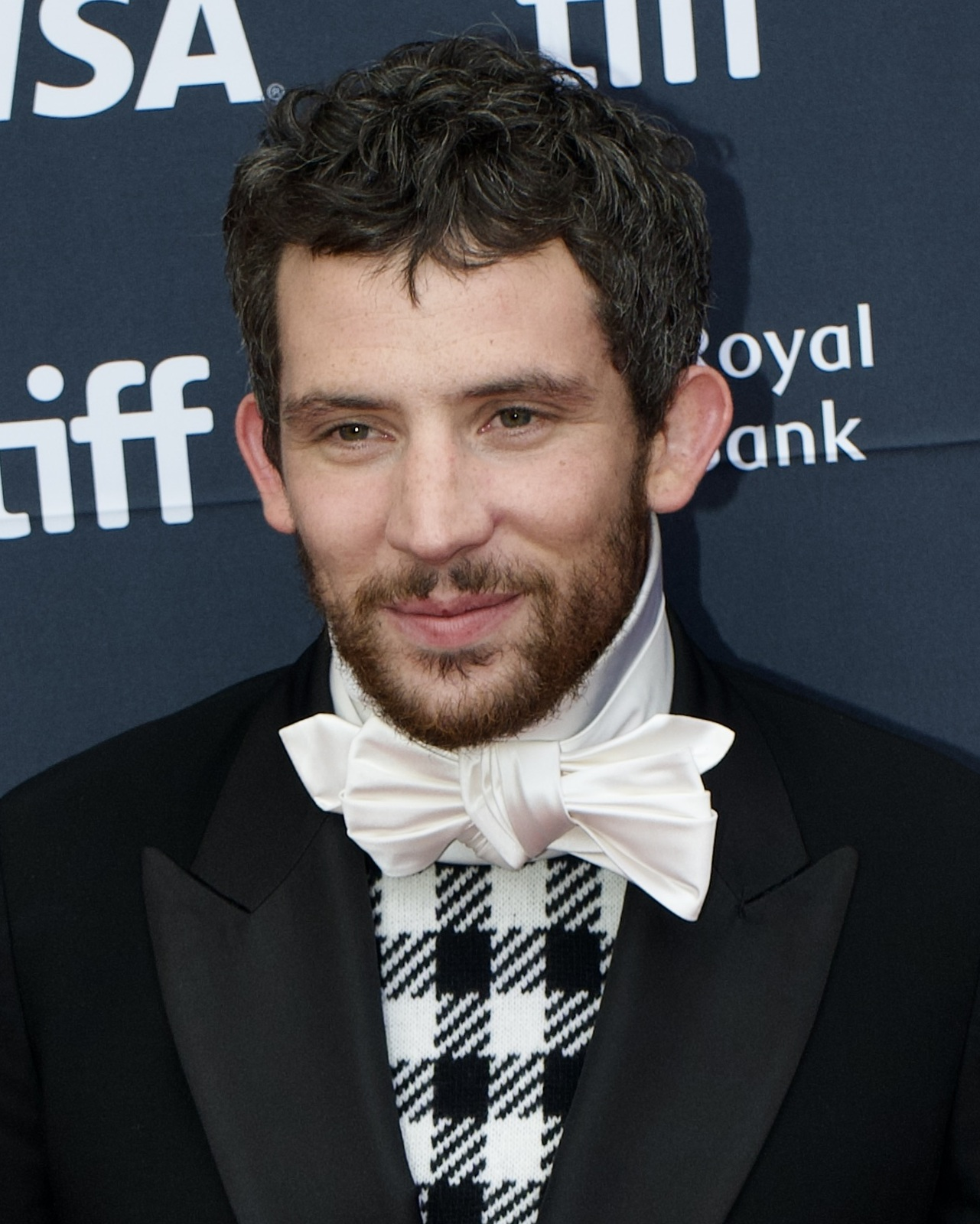
- O'Connor in 2025
- Born: Joshua Mathias O'Connor; 20 May 1990 (age 36); Southampton, Hampshire, England
- Education: Bristol Old Vic Theatre School (BA)
- Occupation: Actor
- Years active: 2012–present
- Relatives: John Bunting (grandfather); Madeleine Bunting (aunt)

Joshua Mathias O'Connor (born 20 May 1990) is an English actor. From 2016 to 2019, he had a major role portraying Larry Durrell in ITV's The Durrells. He had his breakthrough playing the lead role of a gay sheep farmer in Francis Lee's romantic drama God's Own Country (2017), for which he won the BIFA Award for Best Actor.

O'Connor gained recognition for his portrayal of Charles, Prince of Wales, in the Netflix drama series The Crown (2019–2020), winning the Primetime Emmy Award for Outstanding Lead Actor in a Drama Series for the role. He has since starred in the period drama Emma (2020), Italian adventure La chimera (2023), heated romance Challengers (2024), heist drama The Mastermind (2025), tragic romance The History of Sound (2025), murder mystery Wake Up Dead Man (2025), and science fiction thriller Disclosure Day (2026).

== Early life and education ==
O'Connor was born to John, a teacher, and Emily, a midwife. He grew up in Newbury until he was five, when his family moved to Cheltenham, Gloucestershire, where he was brought up. He is the middle son in a family of three boys. He grew up Catholic.

O'Connor's grandfather was sculptor John Bunting, his grandmother was a ceramicist, and his maternal aunt is British writer and commentator Madeleine Bunting. His ancestry is Irish, English, Scottish and, through his matrilineal great-grandmother, Ashkenazi and Sephardi Jewish.

He wanted to be a professional artist when he was younger, but he did not think he was good enough, so he switched to rugby and then discovered acting. His first major role was at age seven as the scarecrow in a school production of The Wizard of Oz, followed by a minor role in a school production of Bugsy Malone. O'Connor went to a private co-ed school, St Edward's School, Cheltenham, during the week and spent a lot of time on weekends at the Axiom, a local arts centre. He grew up in a Labour-supporting household, but he traces his political awakening to the arts centre's closure when he was eleven, feeling the deep sense of loss in the community. He is proud to have grown up outside London, in a town with a strong tradition of regional theatre.

The production of Bugsy Malone at St Edward's also featured his classmate Tahliah Barnett, who later became a singer under the stage name FKA Twigs. O'Connor has cited his school's drama programme as having helped him live with his dyslexia for many years, especially when preparing for his GCSEs. He then trained at the Bristol Old Vic Theatre School, from which he graduated in 2011, and then moved to London. During his third year of theatre school, he signed with an agent.

== Career ==
=== 2012–2018: Early work and breakthrough ===
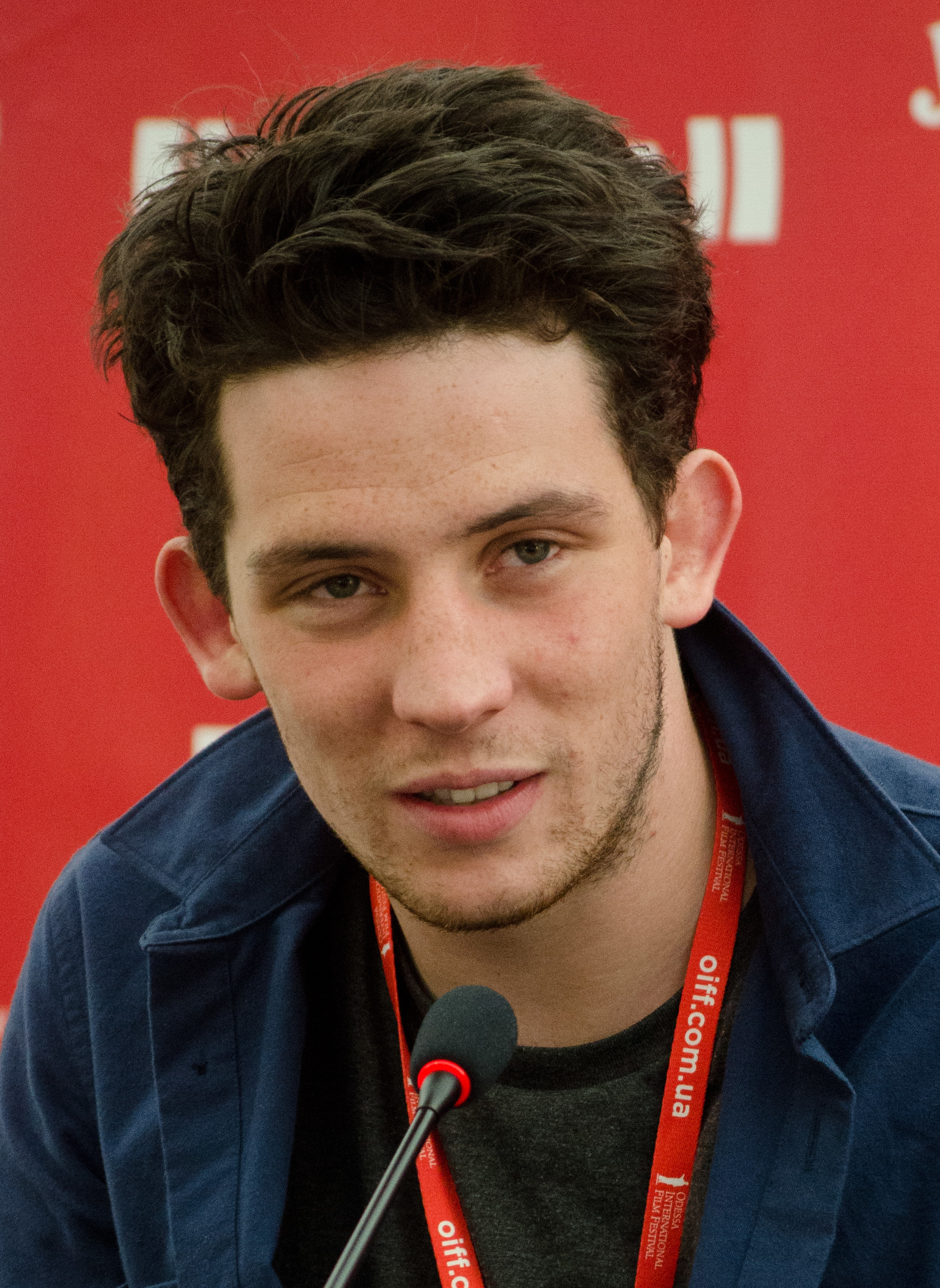
O'Connor in 2015

In 2012, O'Connor first appeared on television as Charlie Stephenson in Lewis and on film as a zombie in The Eschatrilogy: Book of the Dead. In 2013, he appeared in Doctor Who as Piotr, in The Magnificent Eleven as Andy, in Law & Order: UK as Rob Fellows, in The Wiper Times as Dodd and in London Irish as James.

On stage in 2013, he was cast as Ben Fowles in his first professional play, Farragut North by Beau Willimon at the Southwark Playhouse. The Independent remarked: "O’Connor delivers a comic gem of a performance." This led to a role as young returning soldier Hugh in Peter Gill's 2014 play Versailles at the Donmar Warehouse in Covent Garden, London.

In the same year, he played Max in Hide and Seek, James in Peaky Blinders and PC Bobby Grace in Ripper Street. After a year and a half of auditioning, he landed the role of a Bullingdon toff named Ed in The Riot Club (2014), Lone Scherfig's adaptation of Laura Wade's play Posh, appearing alongside up-and-coming British actors Sam Claflin, Douglas Booth, Max Irons, Freddie Fox, Ben Schnetzer and Olly Alexander.

In 2015, he played Leo Beresford in Father Brown, a ballroom palace guard in Cinderella and Charlie in the short film Holding on for a Good Time. He starred opposite his then-girlfriend Hannah Murray in Bridgend, Jeppe Rønde's dark, fictional portrayal of a real town in Wales with an alarmingly high teen suicide rate. O'Connor played Rich in the biographical drama film The Program about the cyclist Lance Armstrong, directed by Stephen Frears.

He also played in the Royal Shakespeare Company's production of Thomas Dekker's The Shoemaker's Holiday as Rowland Lacy and Tom Morton-Smith's Oppenheimer as Luis Alvarez at the Swan Theatre in Stratford-upon-Avon. The following year, he took over the role of Donaghy in Florence Foster Jenkins, starring Meryl Streep and Hugh Grant, and starred as Donald in the short film Best Man. From 2016 to 2019, he played the role of Lawrence "Larry" Durrell in the ITV comedy-drama The Durrells.

In 2017, he starred as the young sheep farmer Johnny Saxby in the British drama film God's Own Country directed by Francis Lee. In preparation for his role, he worked with a Yorkshire farmer, labouring in the fields in between takes to learn the proper techniques and get the right physicality, and eventually birthed over 150 lambs. The film premiered at the Sundance Film Festival to critical acclaim. For his performance, he received multiple recognitions including the British Independent Film Award for Best Actor and the Empire Award for Best Male Newcomer, and was nominated for the BAFTA Rising Star Award.

In 2018, O'Connor starred as Peter in the segment The Colour of His Hair in Boys on film 18: Heroes, and starred alongside Laia Costa in Harry Wootliff's directorial debut Only You, which premiered in competition at the London Film Festival. For his performance, he received his second British Independent Film Award for Best Actor. In 2019, he portrayed Marius Pontmercy in the British television adaptation of Victor Hugo's Les Misérables. He also starred as Jamie in Hope Gap, which premiered at the Toronto International Film Festival, earning the Best Actor award at the Barcelona-Sant Jordi International Film Festival. It had a limited release in theaters, before dropping digitally in May 2020.

=== 2019–present: Critical acclaim ===
In the same year, O'Connor began portraying Charles, Prince of Wales, in Season 3 of the Netflix historical drama The Crown (2019), starring alongside Olivia Colman, Tobias Menzies and Helena Bonham Carter. In 2020, he was nominated for a British Academy Television Award for Best Supporting Actor for his role, while the cast won the Screen Actors Guild Award for Outstanding Performance by an Ensemble in a Drama Series. He revealed that the role did not initially interest him and that he had to be persuaded to audition. Creator Peter Morgan asked him to read a scene in which Charles compares himself to a character in Saul Bellow's 1944 novel Dangling Man, in which the character waits to be drafted into war because the war will give his life meaning. It was the "aimlessness and purposelessness of Charles's life as heir to the throne" that ultimately sparked O'Connor's interest in the character.

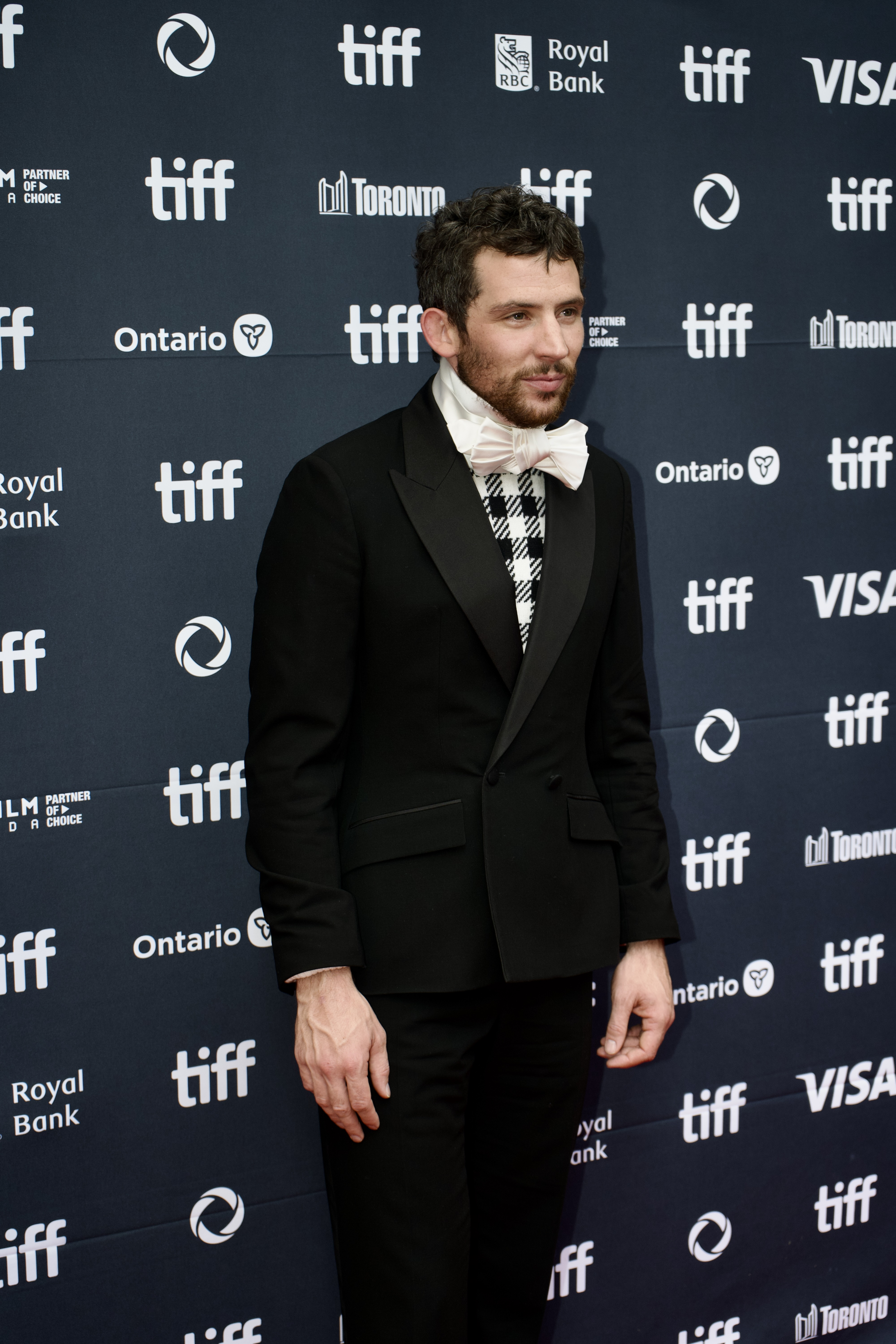
O'Connor at the 2025 Toronto International Film Festival

He reprised the role for Season 4 of The Crown, and admitted that his character is "horrible" in that season. Still, he said he understood the source of Charles' discontent, saying that it all boils down to the fact that Charles has spent his entire life being overlooked. O'Connor's performance received universal acclaim and earned him the Primetime Emmy Award for Outstanding Lead Actor in a Drama Series, the Golden Globe Award for Best Actor – Television Series Drama, and the Critics' Choice Television Award for Best Actor in a Drama Series, in addition to nominations for the British Academy Television Award for Best Actor and the Screen Actors Guild Award for Outstanding Performance by a Male Actor in a Drama Series. The cast also won its second Screen Actors Guild Award for Outstanding Performance by an Ensemble in a Drama Series. He described the culmination of his journey as Prince Charles as "the experience of a lifetime."

O'Connor also played Mr. Elton in the period comedy-drama film Emma based on Jane Austen's 1815 novel of the same name. In 2021, he portrayed Romeo in the Royal National Theatre's television film adaptation of Shakespeare's Romeo and Juliet. He also played Paul Sheringham in Mothering Sunday, which explores class divides and postwar survivor's guilt in 1924, starring alongside Olivia Colman and Colin Firth. In the same year, it was announced that he would be working with Francis Lee again on a horror film with themes of "class and queerness". O'Connor was seen in the drama film Lee, starring Kate Winslet, which is set during World War II and directed by Ellen Kuras. That film premiered at the 2023 Toronto International Film Festival. O'Connor also starred opposite Zendaya and Mike Faist in Challengers, directed by Luca Guadagnino. Initially due to premiere at the 80th Venice International Film Festival, the film was postponed and released in 2024, due to the 2023 writers' and actors' strike.

In 2024, it was announced that O'Connor had joined the cast of Wake Up Dead Man, the third installment of the Knives Out film series directed by Rian Johnson. The film was released on 12 December 2025. O'Connor also joined the cast of Disclosure Day, directed by Steven Spielberg, in November 2024, which was released in the summer of 2026. O'Connor then starred opposite Paul Mescal in The History of Sound, a World War I love story film directed by Oliver Hermanus. It premiered at the 78th Cannes Film Festival and was released in September 2025 at the United States. From September to October 2026, he starred as Joe Bonaparte, in the Sam Yates production of Golden Boy, at the Almeida Theatre.

O'Connor did a screen test for the role of James Bond in October 2026 for the franchise's upcoming 26th film. The role ultimately went to Robert Pattinson.

== Artistry ==
Francis Lee, director of God's Own Country, has described O'Connor as "one of those rare actors that is a real shape-shifter". O'Connor experimented with method acting for his role in God's Own Country. He described his experience for Interview magazine:

I had my own book of senses—paintings and drawings that I'd done and ideas I had. From there, I worked physically with Francis about how this guy would look. By the end of the film I was so skinny; I was gaunt. It was horrific. I was in character the whole way through. It was really lonely and hard. I don't think I'd do it again. You isolate yourself from all your friends.

The Crown creator Peter Morgan has compared O'Connor to former Barcelona midfielder Andrés Iniesta, a footballer with massive but unobtrusive skill. "I was drawn to his sensitivity and the fact that he was complex but likable," Morgan said on casting O'Connor as Prince Charles. Olivia Colman praised him for the tenderness he displayed on-screen, as well as his ability to inhabit the role: "Fragility, sparkle, strength, doubt: It’s all there in a second. Every scene we had together became my favorite scene."

== Other ventures ==
O'Connor created the Waterlogged initiative to raise funds for Mind, a mental health charity working across England and Wales. Inspired by his mother who swam 60 times in her 60th year and by Roger Deakin's Waterlog, he attempted 30 swims around the UK and Ireland in his 30th year. In January 2020, he and Olivia Colman visited the Stars Appeal, which aims to enhance the patient experience at the Salisbury District Hospital. In December 2020, he and Emma Corrin offered their company for tea as part of a series of prize draws in support for War Child UK's Torn From Home appeal.

Since 2017, O'Connor has been a brand ambassador for Loewe. In March 2021, he starred in Loewe's campaign shot in the Baja California desert for the Eye / Loewe / Nature collection made with sustainable thinking and recycling ethos. It pledged 15 euros of every sale to Fundación Global Nature, a charity for the protection of wildlife species in danger of extinction.

In December 2025 O'Connor hosted Season 51, Episode 8 of Saturday Night Live with musical guest Lily Allen.

In January 2026, he was announced as a brand ambassador for Dior. Furthermore, in September 2026, O'Connor starred in a surreal short film for A24 and Dior. The short also features Drew Starkey, Sophie Wilde, Sabrina Carpenter, Camille Cottin who all play fashion designer Jonathan Anderson - alongside Jonathan Anderson himself. In November 2026, O’Connor starred in a Christmas animated short film for Dior.

== Personal life ==
O'Connor lived in a Victorian house in Shoreditch and briefly relocated to New York for "a spell" with his former partner before moving back to Gloucestershire in 2023, where he bought a house near the town of Stroud. In his spare time, O'Connor enjoys reading, drawing, camping, swimming, embroidering, making ceramics and gardening. As of 2025, he is dating Irish actress Alison Oliver.

=== Political views and activism ===
O'Connor is a supporter of the Labour Party, campaigned for Jeremy Corbyn in the 2019 general election, and has described himself as a "liberal left-winger". He said of his views on the monarchy: "I'm a republican, although not in any kind of fist-waving, campaigning way. I was always mostly uninterested in them." In an interview with The New York Times in 2020 he said: "I think [Queen Elizabeth II] is an extraordinary woman. Time after time, lots of men have failed, and this one woman in power has been consistent and remained dutiful and generally apolitical. In that sense, I have huge respect for her — and for Charles [who] is another level of someone who's literally been waiting his entire life for this moment that still hasn't come."

In September 2025, O'Connor signed an open pledge with Film Workers for Palestine pledging not to work with Israeli film institutions "that are implicated in genocide and apartheid against the Palestinian people."

== Acting credits ==
Key
†	Denotes films that have not yet been released

=== Film ===
Year	Title	Role	Notes	Ref.
2013	The Magnificent Eleven	Andy		
2014	Hide and Seek	Max		
2014	The Riot Club	Ed Montgomery		
2015	Bridgend	Jamie		
2015	Cinderella	Ballroom Palace Guard		
2015	The Program	Rich		
2016	Florence Foster Jenkins	Donaghy		
2017	God's Own Country	Johnny Saxby		
2018	Only You	Jake		
2019	Hope Gap	Jamie		
2020	Emma	Mr. Elton		
2021	Mothering Sunday	Paul Sheringham		
2022	Aisha	Conor Healy		
2023	La chimera	Arthur		
2023	Lee	Antony Penrose		
2023	Bonus Track	Jonno	Also story writer	
2024	Challengers	Patrick Zweig		
2025	Rebuilding	Thomas "Dusty" Fraser Jr.		
2025	The History of Sound	David White		
2025	The Mastermind	James Blaine "J.B." Mooney		
2025	Wake Up Dead Man	Rev. Jud Duplenticy		
2026	Disclosure Day	Dr. Daniel Kellner		
2026	Christian Dior's Night in Color	The Chair	Short film, voice	
2027	Jack of Spades †	TBA	Post-production	
2027	The Three Incestuous Sisters †	Paris	Post-production	

=== Television ===
Year	Title	Role	Notes	Ref.
2012	Lewis	Charlie Stephenson	Episode: "Generation of Vipers"	
2013	Doctor Who	Piotr	Episode: "Cold War"	
2013	Law & Order: UK	Rob Fellows	Episode: "Dependent"	
2013	London Irish	James	Episode: "1.1"	
2014	Peaky Blinders	James	3 episodes	
2014	Ripper Street	PC Bobby Grace	8 episodes	
2015	Father Brown	Leo Beresford	Episode: "The Curse of Amenhotep"	
2016–2019	The Durrells	Lawrence Durrell	26 episodes	
2019	Les Misérables	Marius Pontmercy	3 episodes	
2019–2020	The Crown	Charles, Prince of Wales	Main role (Seasons 3–4); 13 episodes	
2021	Romeo and Juliet	Romeo	Filmed version of the 2021 play	
2025	Saturday Night Live	Himself (host)	Episode "Josh O'Connor/Lily Allen"	

=== Theatre ===
Year	Title	Role	Director	Playwright	Theatre	Ref.
2013	Farragut North	Ben Fowles	Guy Unsworth	Beau Willimon	Southwark Playhouse	
2014	Versailles	Hugh Skidmore	Peter Gill	Peter Gill	Donmar Warehouse	
2015	The Shoemaker's Holiday	Rowland Lacy	Philip Breen	Thomas Dekker	Swan Theatre	
2015	Oppenheimer	Luis Walter Alvarez	Angus Jackson	Tom Morton-Smith	Swan Theatre, Vaudeville Theatre	
2021	Romeo and Juliet	Romeo	Simon Godwin	William Shakespeare	Filmed at the Royal National Theatre	
2026	Golden Boy	Joe Bonaparte	Sam Yates	Clifford Odets	Almeida Theatre	

== Awards and nominations ==
Award	Year (Note: Indicates the year of ceremony. Each year is linked to the article about the awards held that year, wherever possible.)	Category	Film	Result	Ref.
Astra Film Awards	2026	Best Supporting Actor - Comedy or Musical	Wake Up Dead Man	Nominated	
Astra Midseason Movie Awards	2024	Best Actor	Challengers	Nominated	
Barcelona-Sant Jordi International Film Festival	2020	Best Actor	Hope Gap	Won	
British Academy Film Awards	2018	BAFTA Rising Star Award	—N/a	Nominated	
British Academy Television Awards	2020	Best Supporting Actor	The Crown	Nominated	
British Academy Television Awards	2021	Best Actor	The Crown	Nominated	
British Independent Film Awards	2017	Best Actor	God's Own Country	Won	
British Independent Film Awards	2019	Best Actor	Only You	Won	
LesGaiCineMad	2017	Best Actor	God's Own Country	Won	
Evening Standard British Film Awards	2018	Best Actor	God's Own Country	Nominated	
Evening Standard British Film Awards	2018	Breakthrough of the Year	—N/a	Nominated	
Empire Awards	2018	Best Male Newcomer	God's Own Country	Won	
European Film Awards	2023	European Actor	La chimera	Nominated	
David di Donatello Awards	2024	Best Actor in a Leading Role	La chimera	Nominated	
Critics' Choice Television Awards	2021	Best Actor in a Drama Series	The Crown	Won	
Golden Globe Awards	2021	Best Actor – Television Series Drama	The Crown	Won	
Gotham Independent Film Awards	2025	Outstanding Lead Performance	The Mastermind	Nominated	
Hollywood Critics Association TV Awards	2021	Best Actor in a Streaming Series, Drama	The Crown	Won	
London Film Critics Circle Awards	2018	British/Irish Actor of the Year	God's Own Country	Nominated	
London Film Critics Circle Awards	2024	British/Irish Performer of the Year	La chimera	Nominated	
Primetime Emmy Awards	2021	Outstanding Lead Actor in a Drama Series	The Crown	Won	
Satellite Awards	2021	Best Supporting Actor – Series, Miniseries or Television Film	The Crown	Nominated	
Screen Actors Guild Awards	2020	Outstanding Performance by an Ensemble Cast in a Drama Series	The Crown	Won	
Screen Actors Guild Awards	2021	Outstanding Performance by an Ensemble Cast in a Drama Series	The Crown	Won	
Screen Actors Guild Awards	2021	Outstanding Performance by a Male Actor in a Drama Series	The Crown	Nominated	
Stockholm Film Festival	2017	Best Actor	God's Own Country	Won	

== See also ==
- List of British actors
- List of British republicans
- List of Golden Globe winners
- List of Primetime Emmy Award winners
