= Bridgend (film) =

- Theatrical release poster
- Directed by: Jeppe Rønde
- Written by: Jeppe Rønde; Torben Bech; Peter Asmussen
- Produced by: Michel Schønnemann
- Starring: Hannah Murray; Josh O'Connor; Adrian Rawlins
- Cinematography: Magnus Nordenhof Jønck
- Edited by: Olivier Bugge Coutté
- Music by: Mondkopf
- Production companies: Blenkov & Schønnemann Pictures
- Release dates: 21 January 2015 (International Film Festival Rotterdam); 25 June 2015 (Denmark)
- Running time: 95 minutes
- Country: Wales
- Language: English

Bridgend is a 2015 English-language Danish drama film directed by Jeppe Rønde and written by Rønde alongside Torben Bech and Peter Asmussen. The film is based on the Bridgend suicide incidents. The film had its World Premiere at the International Film Festival Rotterdam and its North American premiere at the Tribeca Film Festival, at both of which it was highly acclaimed; in the latter, it received three awards, including Best Actress for Hannah Murray. The general reviews have been mixed to positive, with Metacritic giving an average score of 53 out of 100 points, counting nine reviews. The film was viewed in Wales however as sensationalist, lacking truth and exploitative of the dead teenagers.

== Cast ==
- Hannah Murray as Sara
- Steven Waddington as Dave
- Josh O'Connor as Jamie
- Adrian Rawlins as Vicar
- Patricia Potter as Rachel
- Aled Thomas as Danny
- Elinor Crawley as Laurel
- Scott Arthur as Thomas
- Jamie Burch as Angus
- Corey Brown as Extra

== Awards and nominations ==
Year	Award	Category	Result
2015	International Film Festival Rotterdam	Hivos Tiger Award	Nominated
2015	Tribeca Film Festival	Best Narrative Feature	Nominated
2015	Tribeca Film Festival	Best Actress	Won
2015	Tribeca Film Festival	Best Cinematography	Won
2015	Tribeca Film Festival	Best Editor	Won
2015	Göteborg International Film Festival	Special Mention, Debut Award	Won
2015	Brussels Film Festival	Distribution Award	Won
2015	Montreal Fantasia Int Film Festival	Prix AQCC - Critics Award	Won
2015	Mannheim-Heidelberg, Int. Film Festival	Special Mention - Cinematography	Won
2015	Cracow Off Camera International Film Festival	Best Cinematography	Won
2015	Ourense Independent Film Festival	Best Actress	Won
2015	Palma de Mallorca Evolution IFF	Best Actress	Won
2015	Palma de Mallorca Evolution IFF	Best Cinematography	Won
