= Hannah Murray =

English former actress (born 1989)

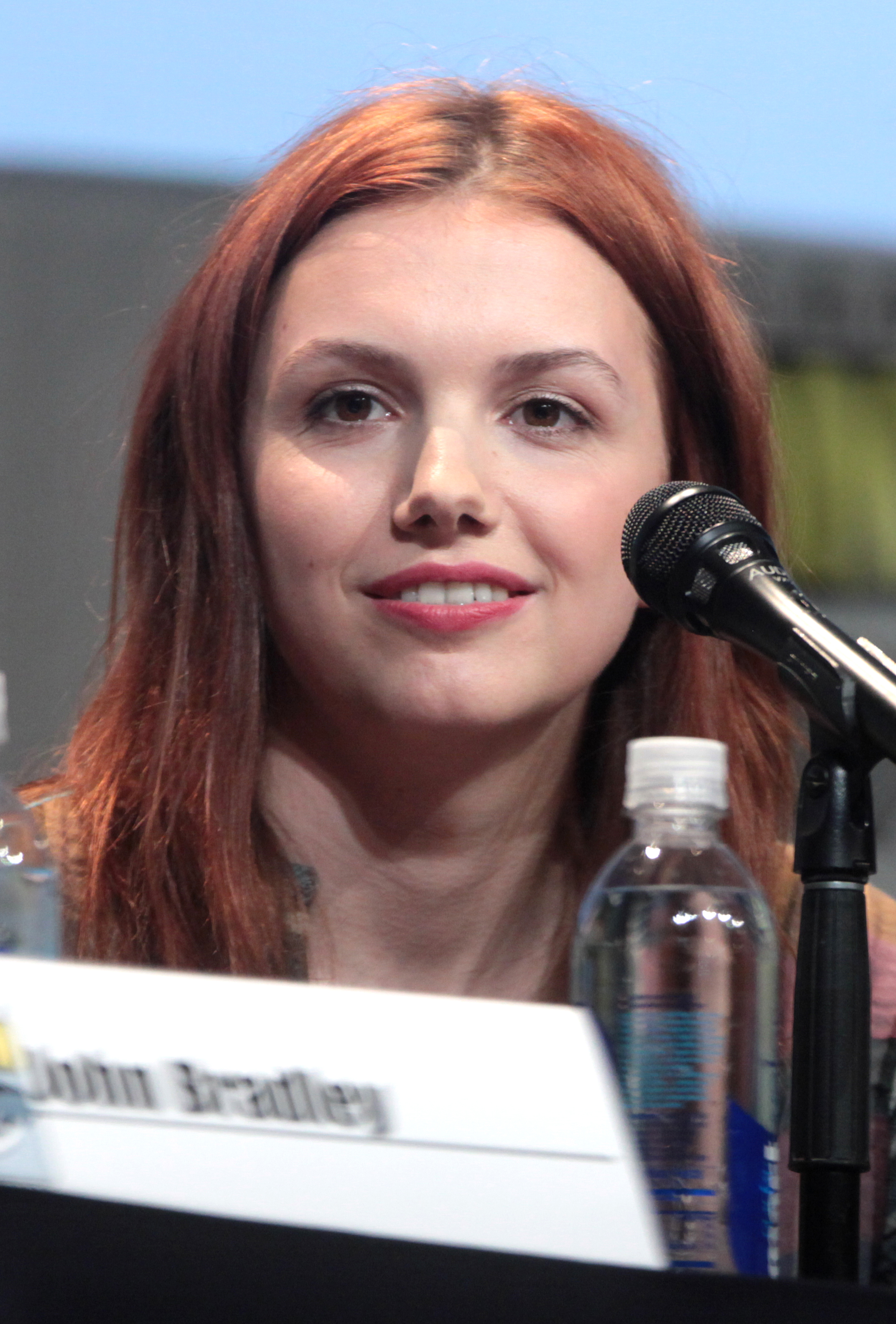
- Murray at San Diego Comic-Con to promote Game of Thrones in 2015.
- Born: Tegan Lauren-Hannah Murray; 1 July 1989 (age 37); Bristol, England
- Education: Queens' College, Cambridge (BA)
- Occupations: Writer, Actress
- Years active: 2006–2020

Tegan Lauren-Hannah Murray (born 1 July 1989) is an English retired actress. She played Cassie in Skins (2007–2008, 2013) and Gilly in the HBO fantasy series Game of Thrones (2012–2019), for which she has been nominated along with her castmates for three Screen Actors Guild Awards. Her film roles include the 2014 musical romance film Stuart Murdoch's God Help The Girl which won her a Special Jury Prize at the Sundance Film Festival, and 2015 drama film Jeppe Rønde's Bridgend for which she won the Tribeca Film Festival Best Actress Award.

Between her screen roles she appeared on stage in Polly Stenham's play That Face in West End (2008) and in the off West End play Martine (2014).

== Early life ==
Murray was born on 1 July 1989 in Bristol. Her parents work at the University of Bristol, her father as a professor and her mother as a research technician. She earned an English degree at Queens' College, Cambridge. She attended North Bristol Post 16 Centre, and was a member of the Bristol Old Vic Young Company.

== Career ==
At the age of 16, Murray heard about an audition for young actors in Bristol, and decided to audition for the experience. The auditions were for the E4 teen drama series Skins. She impressed the producers of the series and was cast as Cassie Ainsworth, a gentle and creative but self-destructive teenager with an eating disorder. Murray and April Pearson were the first two to be cast on the show. Murray went on to appear in the first two series, from 2007 to 2008. She left at the end of the show's second series to make way for a new generation of characters. On the decision to replace the cast, Murray has said that "it would be really silly to be in a teenage drama if you're no longer a teenager".

Following Skins in May 2008, Murray made her stage debut as Mia in the critically acclaimed That Face, a West End production at the Duke of York's Theatre. She was highly praised for her acting in the play, and it was considered a milestone in her career. That same year, she had a small role in the black comedy In Bruges, but her scene was cut from the film.

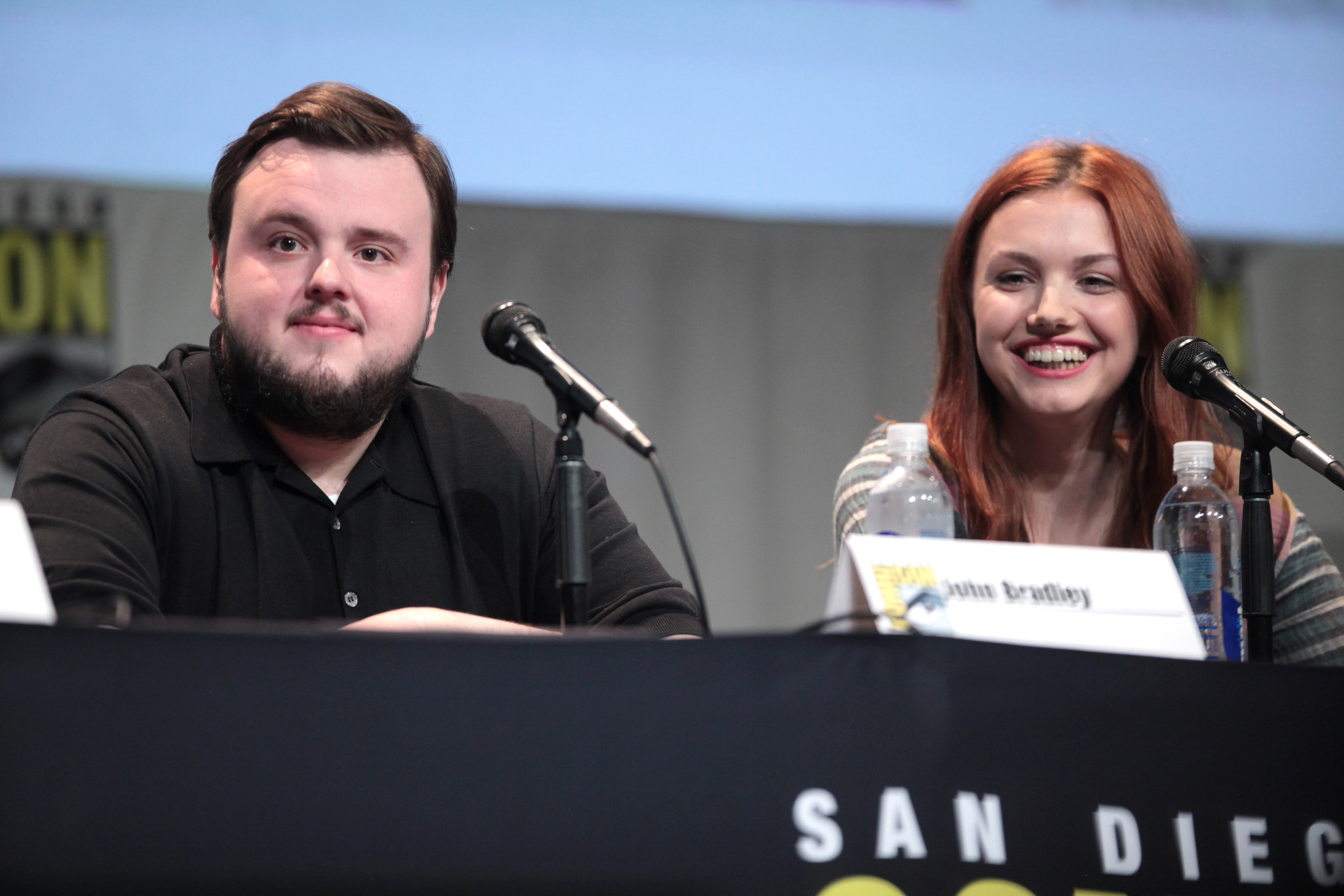
Murray (right) and John Bradley (left) at San Diego Comic-Con to promote Game of Thrones

In 2009, Murray appeared in the ITV adaptation of Agatha Christie's novel Why Didn't They Ask Evans?, playing Dorothy Savage. She also appeared in the thriller film Womb (2010). Later that year, Murray starred in an adaptation of Enda Walsh's Chatroom. The film premiered at the 2010 Cannes Film Festival. In early January, she appeared in the British television thriller Above Suspicion: the Red Dahlia, an adaptation of Linda La Plante's novel, in a small role.

On 8 August 2011, HBO confirmed that Murray would portray Gilly in the second and third seasons of Game of Thrones. She was upgraded to a series regular for the fourth season. Her character is a young woman who has a baby by her own father, and becomes protected by the character Samwell Tarly. In 2012, she appeared in the action thriller film The Numbers Station.

In 2013, Murray appeared in a two-episode feature, in the seventh and final series of Skins, where she reprised her role as a more serious, solemn, and independent adult Cassie Ainsworth. She also starred in the music video for "Your Cover's Blown" by Belle & Sebastian.

In 2014, Murray starred in God Help the Girl, about three musicians in Glasgow. The film premiered at the Sundance Film Festival in January 2014, and Murray shared the World Cinema Dramatic Special Jury Award for the Delightful Ensemble Performance. Later that year she continued her role as Gilly in Game of Thrones season 4. Playing the title role in the acclaimed revival of Jean-Jacques Bernard's play Martine, she was nominated for the 2014 Offie for Best Female Performance (Martine).

Murray starred in Lily & Kat (2015), an independent American film and the first feature directed by Micael Preysler, about inseparable best friends who struggle to make the best of their last few days together, savouring the city nightlife with an enigmatic artist one of them takes a liking to.

In 2015 she played Sara in the Danish film Bridgend, based on the Bridgend suicides of South Wales. The film premiered at the Rotterdam Film Festival, and received positive reviews. The film then had its North American premiere at the Tribeca Film Festival where it won 3 awards, including Murray for Best Actress.

In 2016 Murray played Sylvia Ageloff, a young Jewish American intellectual from Brooklyn and a confidante of Leon Trotsky, in the film The Chosen.

In 2017, Murray starred in Kathryn Bigelow's drama Detroit, based on the Algiers Motel incident during Detroit's 1967 12th Street Riot. The film was critically acclaimed.

In 2018, she played the lead role of Leslie "Lulu" Van Houten, the American convicted murderer and former member of the Manson Family, in the film Charlie Says by Mary Harron. The movie premiered at the 75th Venice International Film Festival and was based on the books The Family, by Ed Sanders, and The Long Prison Journey of Leslie Van Houten, by Karlene Faith.

Murray's first book,The Make-Believe: a memoir of magic and madness, was released on 23 June 2026. The book is an autobiography sharing details of her mental health, involvement with a "wellness organization" and infatuation with its leader. Talking about these events Murray said that "The events of The Make-Believe were intensely challenging to live through, but the journey of writing about them has been the most powerfully rewarding thing I've ever known."

== Personal life ==
In 2024, it was reported as part of the advance publicity for Murray's autobiography that she had been sectioned in 2017 following her involvement in a "wellness cult".

Murray revealed she was diagnosed with bipolar disorder following her psychotic episode that led to her being sectioned.

She is bisexual.

== Acting roles ==
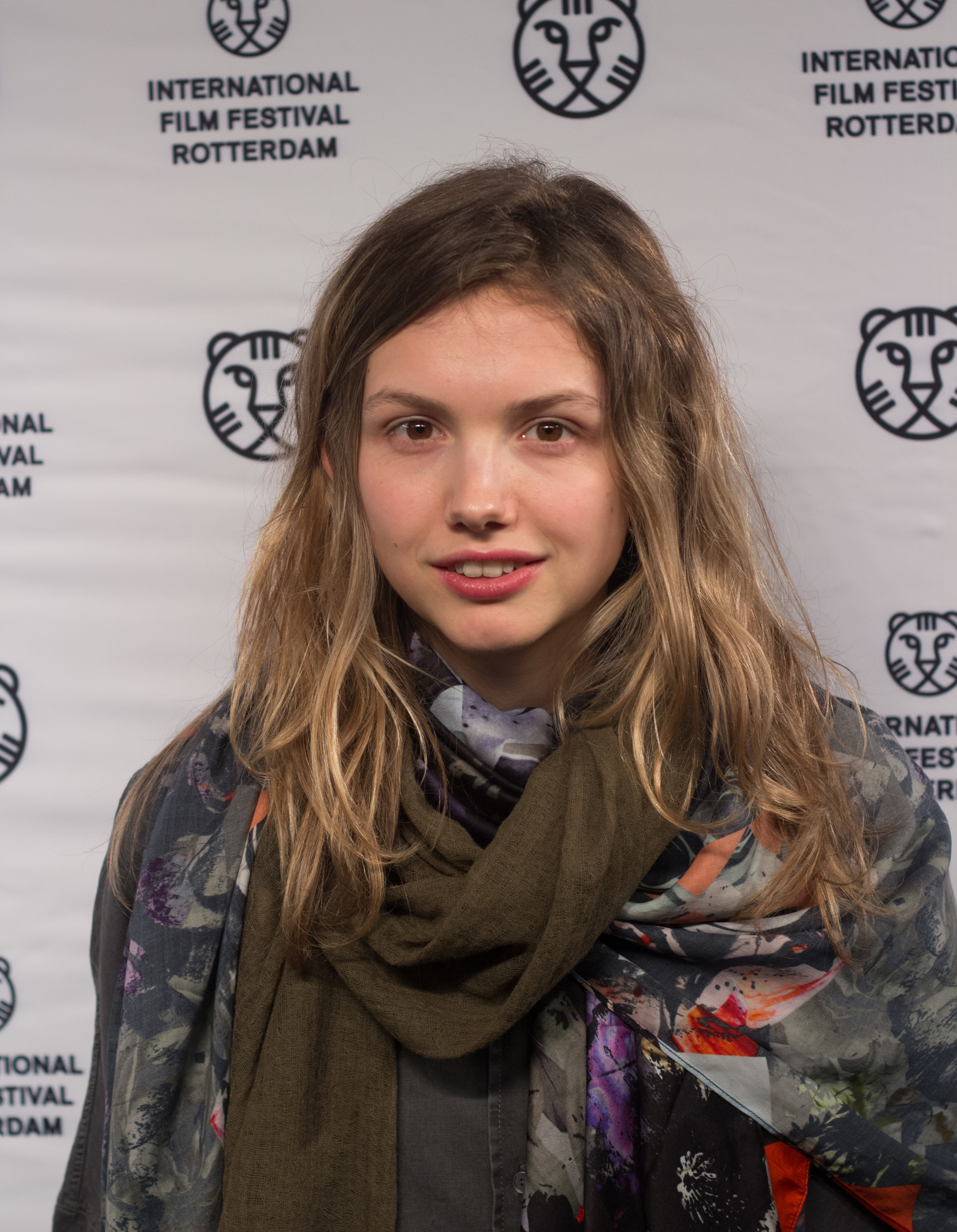
Murray at the International Film Festival Rotterdam in 2015

=== Film ===
Year	Title	Role	Notes
2008	In Bruges	Prostitute	Deleted scene
2010	Womb	Monica	
2010	Chatroom	Emily	
2011	Wings	Ellie	Short Film
2012	Dark Shadows	Hippie Chick	
2012	Little Glory	Jessica	
2013	The Numbers Station	Rachel Davis	
2014	God Help the Girl	Cassie	
2015	Lily & Kat	Kat	
2015	Bridgend	Sara	
2016	The Chosen	Sylvia Ageloff	
2017	Detroit	Julie Hysell	
2018	Charlie Says	Leslie Van Houten	

=== Television ===
Year	Title	Role	Notes
2007–2008, 2013	Skins	Cassie Ainsworth	Main cast, 19 episodes
2009	Agatha Christie's Marple	Dorothy Savage	
2010	Above Suspicion: the Red Dahlia	Emily Wickenham	
2012–2019	Game of Thrones	Gilly	Season 2–3 (Recurring; 9 episodes); Season 4–8 (Main cast; 24 episodes)
2020	The Expecting	Cara	Main cast; 4 episodes

=== Stage ===
Year	Title	Role	Notes
2008	That Face	Mia	Duke of York's Theatre
2014	Martine	Martine	Finborough Theatre

=== Radio ===
Year	Title	Role	Notes
2022	Acid Dreams: The Great LSD Plot	Christine Bott	6 episodes
2013–2014	Welcome to Our Village, Please Invade Carefully	Lucy Alexander	11 episodes

=== Music videos ===
Year	Artist	Title
2013	Belle and Sebastian	"Your Cover's Blown (Miaoux Miaoux Mix)"

=== Video games ===
Year	Title	Role
2020	Shady Part of Me	The Little Girl (voice)

== Awards and nominations ==
Year	Work	Award	Category	Result
2008	Skins	Monte Carlo Television Festival	Outstanding Actress in a Drama Series	Nominated
2008	Skins	NXG Awards	Best Actress	Nominated
2009	Skins	Bafta Awards	Audience Award (TV)	Won
2014	Game of Thrones	Screen Actors Guild Award	Outstanding Performance by an Ensemble in a Drama Series	Nominated
2014	God Help the Girl	Sundance Film Festival	World Cinema Dramatic Special Jury Award for the Delightful Ensemble Performance	Won
2014	Martine	Offie	Best Female Performance	Nominated
2015	Bridgend	Tribeca Film Festival	Best Actress in a Narrative Feature Film	Won
2015	Bridgend	Ourense Independent Film Festival	Best Actress	Won
2015	Bridgend	Palma de Mallorca Evolution IFF	Best Actress	Won
2016	Game of Thrones	Screen Actors Guild Award	Outstanding Performance by an Ensemble in a Drama Series	Nominated
2016	Bridgend	Bodil Awards	Best Actress in a Leading Role	Nominated
2016	Game of Thrones	CinEuphoria Awards	Merit - Honorary Award for an Ensemble	Won
2020	Game of Thrones	Screen Actors Guild Award	Outstanding Performance by an Ensemble in a Drama Series	Nominated
