= Mayfield Grammar School =

Location
- Pelham Road; Gravesend, Kent, DA11 0JE; England
- Coordinates: 51.43677°N 0.35948°E

Information
- Type: Grammar, Academy
- Motto: Per aspera ad astra
- Established: 1914
- Department for Education URN: 137834 Tables
- Ofsted: Reports
- Head teacher: Elaine Wilson
- Staff: 67 (Teaching) 32 (Other)
- Gender: Girls (Lower school), Mixed (Sixth form)
- Age: 11 to 18
- Enrolment: approx. 1,110
- Colours: Navy blue, light blue, Lilac and green
- Website: www.mgsg.kent.sch.uk

Mayfield Grammar School (formerly Gravesend Grammar School for Girls) is a grammar school with academy status, located off Old Road West (B261) in Gravesend, Kent, England. The school accepts girls at age 11 by examination and both girls and boys at age 16, based on their GCSE results.

== History ==
The school was founded in 1914 as the County School for Girls, and moved to its present site in 1926. Currently the school has the main site, consisting of four buildings and an additional site known as Bainbridge (previously known as the "Isaac Newton Building" and often referred to as the IN) which consists mainly of sports and technology facilities, as well as drama. Both sites are situated on Pelham Road and are approximately a 5-10 minute walk from each other. Throughout its history the school has remained selective and was known as Gravesend School for Girls, prior to becoming Gravesend Grammar School for Girls. The school was renamed "Mayfield Grammar School, Gravesend" in September 2011 due to the number of boys in the sixth form which deemed the part of the name 'for Girls' as unsuitable. This action sparked much controversy within the school itself, former pupils, parents, and the local community. The school achieved dual specialisms in Science and Languages.

== Sixth form ==
The sixth form currently contains approximately 250 students, of both boys and girls, studying A Levels in a variety of subjects.

== Notable former pupils ==
- Gemma Arterton, actress
- Hannah Arterton, actress
- Prof Janet Bainbridge (née Munn) OBE, microbiologist and Chief Executive of the European Process Industries Competitiveness Centre from 2001 to 2004
- Hilda Braid, actress, Nana Moon in EastEnders
- Catherine Green, biologist who worked on the production of the Oxford–AstraZeneca COVID-19 vaccine
- Inga Grimsey, Director-General of the Royal Horticultural Society 2006-, and Chief Executive of the Ski Club of Great Britain from 1991 to 1996
- Lindsay Stringer, Professor in Environment and Development and Director of the Sustainability Research Institute at the University of Leeds.
- Karen Vousden, cancer research scientist
- Sara Hardaker, olympian
