= Safe (TV series) =

British television drama series

- Also known as: Harlan Coben's Safe
- Genre: Drama; Thriller
- Created by: Harlan Coben
- Written by: Danny Brocklehurst; Mick Ford; Alex Ganley; Karla Crome
- Starring: Michael C. Hall; Amanda Abbington; Audrey Fleurot; Marc Warren; Hannah Arterton; Emmett J. Scanlan; Joplin Sibtain; Amy James-Kelly; Nigel Lindsay; Laila Rouass; Milo Twomey; Amy-Leigh Hickman; Freddie Thorp; Hero Fiennes Tiffin; Louis Greatorex; Isabelle Allen; Katy Carmichael
- Music by: Ben Onono
- Opening theme: "Glitter & Gold" by Barns Courtney
- Countries of origin: France; United Kingdom
- Original language: English / French
- No. of seasons: 1
- No. of episodes: 8

Production
- Executive producers: Michael C. Hall; Nicola Shindler; Harlan Coben; Danny Brocklehurst; Richard Fee
- Running time: 41–47 minutes
- Production company: Red Production Company

Original release
- Network: C8 (France); Netflix (international)
- Release: 10 May 2018

Safe (titled onscreen as Harlan Coben's Safe) is a drama thriller television miniseries created by crime author Harlan Coben and written by Danny Brocklehurst, Mick Ford, Alex Ganley, and Karla Crome. The series stars Michael C. Hall, Amanda Abbington, Audrey Fleurot, Marc Warren and Hannah Arterton.

Set in England, the series is a production by Canal+, with C8 airing the show in France, and Netflix streaming the show internationally outside France. The series began filming in Manchester, Liverpool, and Cheshire in July 2017. It consists of eight episodes that premiered in 190 countries on 10 May 2018. The series' theme song is "Glitter and Gold" by Barns Courtney.

== Plot ==
Safe focuses on Briton Tom Delaney (Michael C. Hall), a paediatric surgeon and widowed father of two teen daughters. He is struggling to connect with his daughters as they still grieve the loss of his wife, Rachel (Katy Carmichael) from cancer one year prior. After his 16-year-old daughter, Jenny (Amy James-Kelly) goes missing, Tom uncovers a web of secrets as he frantically searches for her.

== Cast and characters ==
=== Main ===
- Michael C. Hall as Tom Delaney, a surgeon, widower to late wife Rachel, father to two daughters, Jenny and Carrie, and current boyfriend and neighbour to Sophie
- Amanda Abbington as Sophie Mason, police DS (Detective Sergeant) partnered to Emma, as well as ex-wife to Josh, mother to their children Henry and Ellen, family friend to the Delaneys and current girlfriend and neighbour to Tom
  - Georgia Rose as Young Sophie
- Audrey Fleurot as Zoé Chahal, a French teacher accused of impropriety, wife to Neil in marital strife and mother to their children Chris and Tilly
- Marc Warren as Pete Mayfield, the gay best friend and fellow doctor to Tom who helps him search for Jenny
- Hannah Arterton as Emma Castle, police DC (Detective Constable) relocated from "the big city" and partnered to Sophie
- Emmett J. Scanlan as Josh Mason, ex-husband to Sophie who lives in a trailer-camper parked in her driveway, and father to their children Henry and Ellen
- Joplin Sibtain as Neil Chahal, husband to Zoe in marital strife and father to their children Chris and Tilly
- Amy James-Kelly as Jenny Delaney, 16, elder daughter to Tom, girlfriend to Chris, who goes missing at the beginning of the series

=== Recurring ===
- Isabelle Allen as Carrie Delaney, younger daughter to Tom
- Katy Carmichael as Rachel Delaney, late wife to Tom who died of terminal cancer
  - Ellie Duckles as Young Rachel
- Freddie Thorp as Chris Chahal, son to Zoé and Neil, and older 19-year-old boyfriend to Jenny, who is involved in Jenny's disappearance
- Imogen Gurney as Tilly Chahal, daughter to Zoé and Neil
- Louis Greatorex as Henry Mason, teenage son to Sophie and Josh, and Jenny's friend who is knowledgeable about technology, diabetic, on dialysis, in need of a kidney transplant and under Tom's medical care, experiencing occasional seizures
- India Fowler as Ellen Mason, daughter to Sophie and Josh
- Amy-Leigh Hickman as Sia Marshall, drug-dealing classmate to Jenny who threw a party on the night she disappeared, and daughter to Jojo and Lauren
- Nigel Lindsay as Jojo Marshall, father to Sia and husband to her mother Lauren
- Laila Rouass as Lauren Marshall, mother to Sia and wife to Sia's father Jojo
- Karen Bryson as Helen Crowthorne, next-door neighbour to the Delaney family
  - Leah Walker as Young Helen
- Ben Onwukwe as Eric Pratchett, a neighbour to the Delaney family and father to Craig, with Eric having scolded Jenny for trespassing on his lawn on the night she went missing
- Hero Fiennes Tiffin as Ioan Fuller, a teenager who may know something about Jenny's disappearance
- Rohan Nedd as Mike Lloyd-Powell, a friend to Chris who was present at Sia's party on the night of Chris's and Jenny's disappearances
- Tyler Conti as Scott, another one of the party-goers, whom Tom and Pete are tracking for information on Jenny's disappearance
- Stephen Henry as Tim Kenmore, the headmaster of the school where Zoé teaches and that Jenny and others attend, who has to deal with a story about sexual relations between a student and teacher
- Raj Paul as Darren, police colleague to Sophie, who shows her station CCTV footage of Jenny from the night she went missing
- Isabella Pinto as Dora
- Milo Twomey as Archie "Bobby" Roberts, owner of a 1980s-themed bar called Heaven
  - Joshua Akehurst as Young Bobby
- Steven Hillman as Sean Penvell, a bouncer who works at the bar Heaven
- Joe Standerline as Martin, a friendly neighbour to the Marshall family who gets caught up in their drama

=== Guest ===
- Darren Kemp as B.O. Ben, a tech expert and friend to Tom, who helps track Jenny's GPS
- Joshua Riley as Young Craig Pratchett, Eric's son who was disfigured in an accident as a boy and interned in Jasmine Hall psychiatric institution for his mental issues, with Rachel visiting him regularly

== Episodes ==
No.	Title	Directed by	Written by	Original release date
1	"Episode 1"	Daniel Nettheim	Danny Brocklehurst	10 May 2018
Surgeon Tom Delaney (Michael C. Hall), a widower, has a strained relationship with his elder daughter, Jenny (Amy James-Kelly). A year after the death of her mother Rachel (Katy Carmichael), Jenny sees Tom sneak off for romantic reasons with family friend Sophie Mason (Amanda Abbington), a police DS (Detective Sergeant), during a neighbourhood picnic. That night, Jenny goes missing after a house party. The next morning, Tom is racked with worry, especially when he learns that Jenny's older boyfriend Chris Chahal (Freddie Thorp) has also disappeared. Chris's mother, French teacher Zoé (Audrey Fleurot), is accused of having an affair with a student after an incriminating USB drive is found in her locker. Sophie butts heads with her new colleague, DC (Detective Constable) Emma Castle (Hannah Arterton), over the case against Zoé. Chris's friend Ioan Fuller (Hero Fiennes Tiffin), who had agreed to lie about Chris's whereabouts, tells Tom that Jenny and Chris attended a party at the house of their friend Sia Marshall (Amy-Leigh Hickman). Tom confronts Sia, but she denies knowing when Jenny left the party. Ioan shares a Facebook feed with Tom, on which Jenny is seen leaving the party with Tom's friend Pete Mayfield (Marc Warren). Sia's father, Jojo (Nigel Lindsay), is shown checking the freezer in his garage, revealing that Chris's dead body is inside it.
2	"Episode 2"	Daniel Nettheim	Danny Brocklehurst	10 May 2018
In a flashback to the night of Jenny's disappearance, party hostess Sia makes a horrifying discovery of a dead body floating in the pool and kicks everyone out before they can discover it. Jojo goes to extreme lengths to protect his daughter by hiding Chris's body in the freezer instead of calling police because Sia supplied drugs for the party. Tom fails to contact Pete about Pete having picked up Jenny from the party, so he enlists police assistance from Sophie. Pete is traced through the movements of his car, and after being pulled over and connected over phone to Tom, cites his homosexuality as a reason not to suspect him of being interested in Jenny, and insists that he simply dropped her back home and wants to help with the search if he can. Tom searches Jenny's room and discovers that she bought a fake ID online. Using neighbourhood security cameras, Pete and Tom track Jenny's movements after Pete dropped her off, discovering she went to Chris's house, where they find evidence he was planning a train trip. Sophie visits the Marshalls' home, but they hide rather than answer the door; investigating the exterior, her suspicions are raised poolside due to a pot plant having been moved, prompting the Marshalls to decide to move the body. At the train station, Tom finds Chris's Vespa, and receives a call from his younger daughter Carrie (Isabelle Allen) reporting that she found photos posted by Chris online showing him with a happy Jenny. However, Tom finds that the dress that Jenny is wearing in the photo is still in her wardrobe, concluding it was taken before her disappearance. A flashback shows the Marshalls using Chris's thumb to unlock his phone and post the old photo. Pete and Tom theorise that Jenny and Chris had gone to a bar called Heaven. The bar owner Bobby (Milo Twomey) claims to have never seen Jenny but he is later seen laying flowers at her mother's grave. While Jojo, Sia and her mother Lauren (Laila Rouass) attempt to move Chris's body after lying to the police, Sia is caught by their neighbour Martin (Joe Standerline) walking in meaning to deliver a gift to them, whom she hits over the head with a wine bottle in panic.
3	"Episode 3"	Julia Ford	Mick Ford	10 May 2018
It is revealed Pete actually followed Jenny into the community after dropping her off the night she went missing. Sia and her family are keeping Martin hostage but she releases him after threatening to accuse him of being a paedophile should he ever talk. An anonymous tip leads Tom and Pete on a frantic chase across the city in pursuit of a mysterious man. They learn the tip came from a bouncer at Heaven called Sean Penvell (Steven Hillman), who overheard Tom's discussion about Jenny with Bobby, and who after being injured by a motorcycle and physically coerced by Tom before calling him an ambulance, reluctantly tells them that Jenny had been at Heaven alone looking for Bobby the night before. Carrie is reported missing from school, and Tom looks for her at his late wife's old office, then an art museum where she took the kids during her illness, and where he finds her. Sophie discovers her son Henry (Louis Greatorex), who is in need of a kidney transplant and under Tom's medical care, was hiding a blood-soaked shirt in his closet. Zoé, out on bail, makes a list of parents with whom she had disagreements; the list includes the Marshalls, who are visited by Sophie and Emma, interrupting (but not discovering) the family's latest attempt to move Chris's body. Tom and Carrie trace Bobby, learning his nickname is short for Archie Roberts, and Tom later discovers he was his late wife Rachel's high-school boyfriend at the school where Zoé teaches. Tom confronts the mysterious Bobby about his lie in saying he didn't recognise Jenny, who is the spitting image of Rachel during high school. Bobby admits realising (from CCTV footage of Jenny's visit to the bar looking for him) that Jenny was Rachel's daughter, and gives Tom a note Jenny left saying she "knows about Jasmine" and would return the next night, but says she did not do so. Emma finds that the photos used to incriminate Zoé were old art photos from the internet. Tom and Pete follow up on the "Jasmine" clue and learn it refers to a psychiatric hospital called Jasmine Hall. Sia and Jojo dispose of Chris's body in a lake, but it floats to the surface after they depart.
4	"Episode 4"	Julia Ford	Mick Ford	10 May 2018
Sophie and Emma break the news of Chris's death to the Chahal family. When the police learn that the water Chris drowned in had chlorine in it, they visit the Marshalls who call a lawyer and are arrested. Sophie learns that her estranged husband Josh (Emmett J. Scanlan) saw Jenny at the train station but obeyed Jenny's request not to tell anyone. Tom and Pete chase down one of the party-goers named Scott (Tyler Conti); Pete follows him to a drug-buy but is discovered, stabbed, and left for dead. Tom catches up with the gang, finds Pete and begins to give him first aid. Jenny is revealed to be in hiding in the next-door neighbour's home, where she learns of the discovery of Chris's body; the homeowner, Helen Crowthorne (Karen Bryson), does not disclose Jenny's whereabouts when Sophie and others in the police detail canvass the neighborhood.
5	"Episode 5"	Daniel O'Hara	Alex Ganley	10 May 2018
Tom fights to save Pete's life after a brutal stabbing, prompting Emma to confess to Tom that Pete is the father she never knew. Scott tells Tom that Jenny was told a secret by Rachel on her deathbed, and that the secret is something Tom should not be told. Sophie warns Tom against interfering in the investigation, and in flashback, we learn Tom was with Sophie when Rachel died. Carrie tells Tom that Helen visited and spoke with Rachel on the night Rachel died. Jojo gives a false confession accepting full guilt for Chris's death; Sia and her mother are released. The neighbourhood holds a vigil for Chris, during which Tom confronts Henry about the bloody sweater he wore during Sia's party. Police unravel Jojo's confession. Tom calls an acquaintance, B.O. Ben (Darren Kemp), and asks him to triangulate his daughter's location using her phone. Ben informs him that her phone signal is connected to a nearby Wi-Fi network, coming from inside Helen's house. Tom goes into the house and discovers a fire has been started inside.
6	"Episode 6"	Julia Ford	Karla Crome	10 May 2018
Flashbacks reveal that Zoe's husband Neil (Joplin Sibtain) was present near the Marshall residence at the time of the party. In the present, Tom goes through the burning house and finds Helen dead. He tracks Jenny’s phone to the Chahal residence, where he meets with the family after the police begin their inquiries into the fire. Their house is also broken into by an unknown assailant. Neil confesses that he planted the pictures in Zoé’s locker as revenge during their marital fight. Autopsy results reveal that Helen was bludgeoned before the fire started. Mike Lloyd-Powell (Rohan Nedd), a friend of Chris's, details the origins of his altercation with Chris at the night of his death to the police. Jenny’s phone and purse are discovered. Pete is discharged from hospital, and Tom confronts Neil about knowledge of Jenny. Neil reveals that he knew Zoé had an affair with a student, revealed to be Ioan.
7	"Episode 7"	Daniel O'Hara	Danny Brocklehurst	10 May 2018
Tom speaks to Ioan about the party, and tells him that Neil knew about his affair with Zoé. Ioan reveals that he saw Jenny and Henry leave the bathroom together. Tom then attempts to question Henry about the party, but is refused by Sophie. Emma reunites with Pete, telling him he is her father, and makes her own attempt to question Henry. Henry reveals that Jenny suspected that her father was spying on her via her phone, which he helped discover after she raised suspicions. Henry then has a seizure, and is brought to the hospital. Tom and Pete go to Heaven, the bar Jenny visited, to speak to Bobby. Having been refused to see him, Tom sneaks into Bobby’s office before being caught and is advised to stay away. At the bar they see Eric Pratchett (Ben Onwukwe), a neighbour to the Delaney family who scolded Jenny for trespassing on his lawn on the night she went missing, and track him to the psychiatric hospital Jasmine Hall, which Rachel frequented. Eric reveals his son, Craig, is being treated there, and that he hasn’t been speaking since a tragic school fire, which a group of students caused by accident in an attempt at revenge against a teacher. He also reveals that there were five kids who were involved in it: Craig, Bobby, Helen, Rachel and Sophie. Tom shows up at Sophie's house and angrily demands answers for withholding the truth from him.
8	"Episode 8"	Daniel O'Hara	Danny Brocklehurst	10 May 2018
Sophie explains the events of the fire to Tom, and that they moved on by contributing to the community, with Bobby the only one who moved away. Sophie is able to set up a meeting with Bobby, claiming to have the school security tape that had been allegedly destroyed. Flashbacks reveal that Jenny discovered information about the fire in her mother’s diary. She then talked to Helen before being asked to leave, stealing the tape in the process. After Jenny and Chris watched the tape together, Chris wanted to confront Sophie about it and turn her in, as he held resentment for her over arresting him for drug charges, but Jenny pleaded with him not to due to her father's relationship with Sophie. Jenny attempted to speak to Bobby, but like her father in the present, was refused. Some time later, Helen told Bobby at her own doorstep that she wanted the truth to come out, prompting him to kill her in a fit of rage, believing he was plugging the secret. In the present, Sophie tricks Bobby into believing she'll assist him in murdering Jenny, while Tom sneaks in to save his daughter after Sophie had left clues for him to follow. Following a scuffle, Bobby holds them all at gunpoint, before carrying out suicide after Tom reminds him Jenny is Rachel's daughter. Tom decides Sophie shouldn't confess to the fire. Later, Emma questions Jenny about a pendant found in the Marshalls' swimming pool, which Tom recognises as Sophie’s. He confronts her about killing Chris, which she admits she did after running into him unexpectedly outside the party while there to pick up Henry and prompting him to reveal he had evidence he would use to take her down, but she stands firm that it was never her intention to kill him. Despite their reconciliation, Tom decides to call the police, and Sophie is arrested and imprisoned as Tom and his family begin to move on.

== Critical response ==
Safe has received positive reviews. It has a 71% approval rating on review aggregator Rotten Tomatoes, based on 24 reviews. While British newspapers The Daily Telegraph and The Guardian found Hall's "odd" English accent to be a metaphor of overall peculiarities with the series, they both found many elements of the show to be entertaining. Ed Power wrote in The Daily Telegraph that Harlan Coben "makes every one of his characters feel plausibly sinister and throws in plenty of skilfully crafted cliff-hangers. Netflix's latest can be hackneyed and is written to formula, but the central mystery is assembled with a watchmaker's eye and the entire fandango whirrs by with ruthless efficiency." The Guardian's Sam Wollaston wrote, "What looked at one point like it might be Netflix's Broadchurch – the disappearance of a teenager, a parent's anguish, the effect on a community, the police investigation – soon starts to look more like Desperate Housewives. I'm very much enjoying these people, without really caring about them."

Maureen Ryan of Variety praised the series, writing, "It's a highly watchable, semi-pulpy serial loaded with reveals, clues and cliffhangers, and the core cast is generally quite good." Ben Travers of IndieWire found the series entertaining and graded it a B, writing, "Safe leans into most of its increasingly preposterous moments, including Hall's accent. It's not that the show or its star's elocution are bad, per se; they just don't overwork themselves trying to convince you of their grand importance. Safe is a soap, and it's a fun diversion as such."

Daniel Fienberg of The Hollywood Reporter, who based his review on the first two episodes sent to critics, criticised Hall's accent and performance, the depiction of teens and other elements of the series as all off-tone. Fienberg wrote, "It could take watching the six additional episodes to know if there's a cliché-upending payoff or if Safe is just a muddle."
