= John Bunting (sculptor) =

British sculptor and teacher (1927–2002)

- Born: John Joseph Bunting; 3 August 1927; London, England
- Died: 19 November 2002 (aged 75); London, England
- Education: Saint Martin's School of Art; Royal College of Art
- Occupation: Sculptor
- Spouse: Romola Jane Farquharson (divorced)
- Children: 5, including Madeleine Bunting
- Relatives: Josh O'Connor (grandson)

John Joseph Bunting (3 August 1927 – 19 November 2002) was a British sculptor and teacher. He was influenced by furniture-maker Robert (Mouseman) Thompson in Kilburn, North Yorkshire, and after Oxford University and a period of National Service, he returned to Yorkshire as Thompson's wood shop apprentice in 1948.

== Life and career ==
Bunting was born in London, England, the son of Bridget E. (née McElearney) and Bernard L. M. Bunting, a tea broker. His mother was of Irish descent. Evacuated to Yorkshire in 1939, he was sent to the Benedictine-run Ampleforth College.

A meeting with Henry Moore led to his attending Saint Martin's School of Art and then the Royal College of Art in 1950. He was appointed Master of Drawing at Ampleforth College in 1955 where his pupils included sculptors Antony Gormley, Martin Jennings, painter Andrew Festing and wood engraver Simon Brett. His life and work as a sculptor is recounted by Jonathan Black in his book Spirit of Faith, published in 2012 by the John Bunting Foundation (www.johnbuntingfoundation.com).

He died in 2002 in London. His long history with and building of a War Memorial Chapel near Oldstead and creation of its sculptures are documented in the book, The Plot: A Biography of an English Acre, by Madeleine Bunting, one of his five children.

With his former wife, Romola Jane Farquharson, he had five children, including Madeleine. Their grandson is actor Josh O'Connor.
