= The Magnificent Eleven (film) =

- Directed by: Jeremy Wooding
- Written by: John Adams; Peter Adams; Irvine Welsh
- Starring: Josh O'Connor; Robert Vaughn; Sean Pertwee; Joseph Millson; Irvine Welsh; Keith Allen (actor)
- Cinematography: Ian Howes
- Edited by: Kant Pan
- Music by: Phil Lawrence
- Distributed by: Eureka Entertainment (UK)
- Release date: May 13, 2013
- Running time: 91 minutes
- Countries: United Kingdom; United States
- Language: English

The Magnificent Eleven is a 2013 American western film directed by Jeremy Wooding and written by John Adams, Peter Adams and Irvine Welsh. The film stars Josh O'Connor, Robert Vaughn, Joseph Millson and Irvine Welsh.

Briefly shown in Cannes in May 2012, after a brief theatrical release in March 2013 in Ireland and in May 2016 in the UK, it was released in 2013 in DVD.

== Plot ==
A modern remake of the film The Magnificent Seven, in East End of London where "cowboys" are a football team and "Indians" run the local curry house.

The Cowboys FC, overage and overweight South London team, are sponsored by an Indian restaurant.

== Cast ==
- Josh O'Connor as Andy.
- Robert Vaughn as American Bob.
- Sean Pertwee as Pete.
- Joseph Millson as Fire Chief .
- Irvine Welsh as Disgruntled Diner.
- Keith Allen (actor) as Dave.
- Phillip Rhys as Ramesh.
