= Amy James-Kelly =

Northern Irish actress (born 1995)

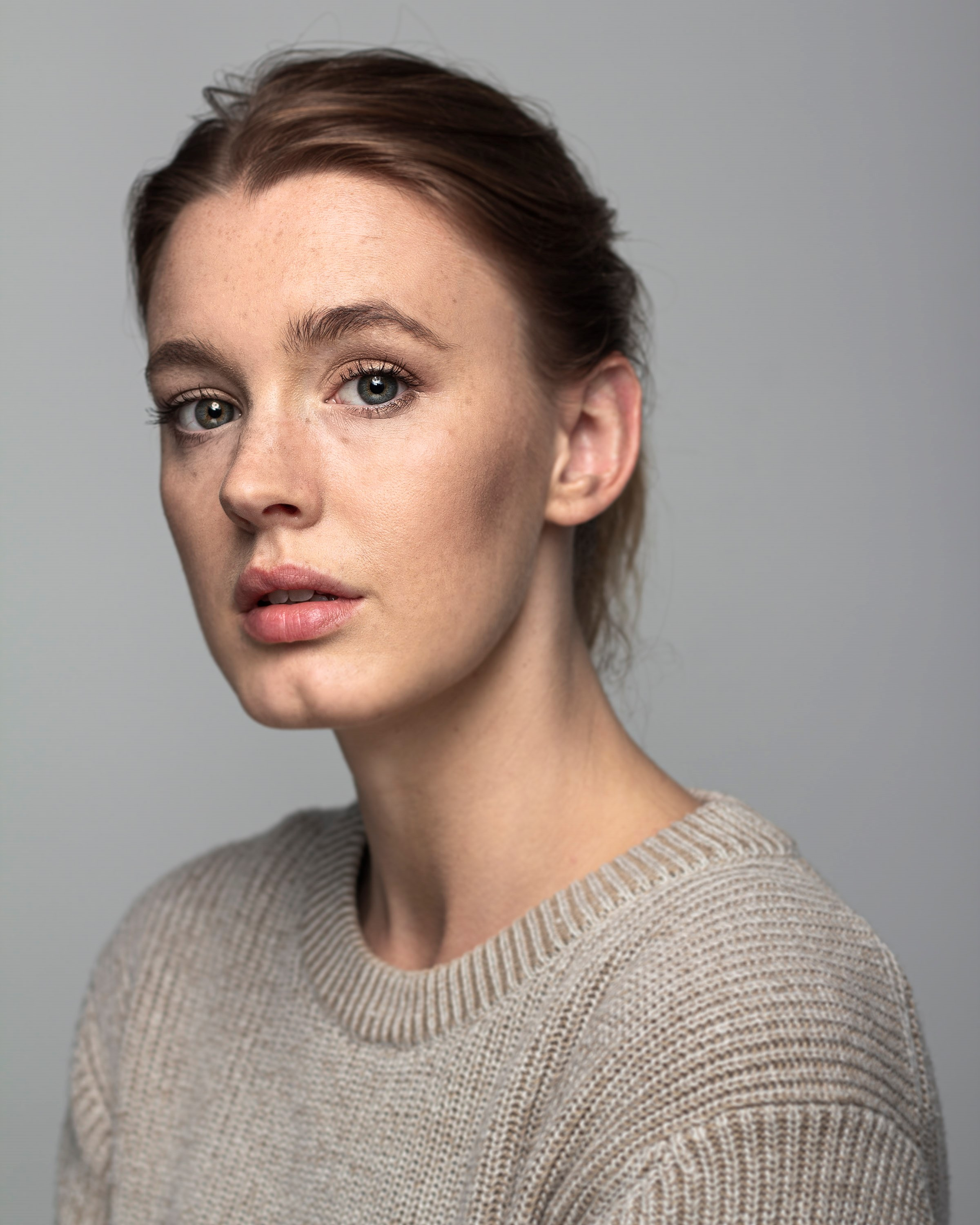
- James-Kelly in 2022
- Born: Amy James-Kelly; 15 November 1995 (age 30); Antrim, Northern Ireland
- Occupation: Actress
- Years active: 2013–present

Amy James-Kelly (born 15 November 1995) is a Northern Irish actress. She gained prominence through her role as Maddie Heath in the ITV soap opera Coronation Street (2013–2015). She has since played leading and recurring roles in numerous television series, such as Jericho (2016), Safe (2018), Gentleman Jack (2019–2022), The Bay (2021), Three Families (2021), and Everyone Else Burns (2023–2024), as well as portraying Anne Boleyn in the Netflix miniseries Blood, Sex & Royalty (2022). She made her feature film debut in Military Wives (2019).

== Early life ==
James-Kelly was born in Antrim, Northern Ireland and moved to England as a baby. She spent the first year of her life in Catterick, North Yorkshire before settling down in Failsworth, Greater Manchester. She attended The Blue Coat School, Oldham. She took extra-curricular classes at the Manchester School of Acting.

== Career ==
James-Kelly began her career in theatre productions of Beauty Manifesto, Trojan Women, My Fair Lady and Frank and Ferdinand.

In December 2013, James-Kelly made her television debut in the ITV soap opera Coronation Street as Maddie Heath, a troubled teenager and Sophie Webster's love interest. James-Kelly found out she had been cast on the bus home from college. In February 2015, she announced she would be leaving Coronation Street and made her final appearance that June when her character was killed off. On leaving, James-Kelly said, "I made the decision to leave because I'm young and adventurous, and I want to gain more experience and explore and improve my craft. Acting is my passion and I'm excited to see where it takes me." She landed her second television role as Martha Quaintain in the 2016 period drama miniseries Jericho.

James-Kelly starred as Jenny Delaney in the 2018 Netflix series Safe. She also had a guest role in the BBC One series Moving On. James-Kelly made her feature film debut as Sarah in the 2019 comedy-drama Military Wives. That same year, she had a recurring role as Suzannah Washington in the BBC One and HBO series Gentleman Jack. In 2021, James-Kelly appeared as Grace Marshbrook in series 2 of the ITV crime drama The Bay and starred as Hannah Kennedy in the two-part BBC One drama Three Families. She has a role in the Channel 4 sitcom Everyone Else Burns (since 2023).

== Filmography ==
=== Film ===
Year	Title	Role	Notes
2017	Last Summer	Emma	Short film (also writer, director, producer)
2018	Mission Christmas	Amy	Short film
2019	Girl Alone	The Girl	Short film
2019	Military Wives	Sarah	
2021	Seacole	Miss Eames	

=== Television ===
Year	Title	Role	Notes
2013–2015	Coronation Street	Maddie Heath	131 episodes
2016	Jericho	Martha Quintain	Miniseries, 7 episodes
2018	Moving On	Emma	Episode: "The Registrar"
2018	Safe	Jenny Delaney	Main role. Miniseries, 8 episodes
2019–2022	Gentleman Jack	Suzannah Washington/Sowden	7 episodes
2021	The Bay	Grace Marshbrook	3 episodes (series 2)
2021	Three Families	Hannah Kennedy	Miniseries, 2 episodes
2022	Blood, Sex & Royalty	Anne Boleyn	3 part docu-drama
2023–present	Everyone Else Burns	Rachel Lewis	Main role
2026	Industry	Jennifer Bevan	7 episodes

== Awards and nominations ==
Year	Award	Category	Work	Result	Ref.
2014	British Soap Awards	Best Newcomer	Coronation Street	Nominated	
2023	Edinburgh International Television Festival	Breakthrough Actor	Everyone Else Burns	Nominated	
