= Three Families =

- Genre: Drama
- Written by: Gwyneth Hughes
- Directed by: Alex Kalymnios
- Country of origin: United Kingdom
- Original language: English
- No. of episodes: 2

Production
- Executive producers: Susan Hogg; Gwyneth Hughes; Gaynor Holmes
- Production location: Northern Ireland
- Production company: Studio Lambert

Original release
- Network: BBC One
- Release: 10 May – 11 May 2021

Three Families is a British two-part television drama series developed by Studio Lambert for BBC One. It is directed by Alex Kalymnios from a script by Gwyneth Hughes. Set in Northern Ireland between 2013 and 2019 when abortion was de facto decriminalised, it is a dramatisation of true stories from families who were affected by its restrictive abortion laws. It aired on BBC One on 10 and 11 May 2021.

== Premise ==
=== Episode 1 ===
This episode takes place between 2013 and 2015.

Northern Ireland, 2013. A mother is forced to question her own beliefs when her teenage daughter reveals she is pregnant. Intent only on protecting her child, Theresa makes a hard choice. But as word starts to get out, she discovers that she could face a prison sentence for breaking one of Northern Ireland's most controversial laws.

Young newlyweds Hannah and Jonathan are devastated when they learn that their much-wanted baby will not survive the pregnancy. In their grief, the couple speak to their doctor about their options, only to realise how limited their choices are.

=== Episode 2 ===
This episode takes place between 2015 and 2019.

Determined to change the law, Hannah throws herself into campaigning. Her fight brings victory in the High Court, which soon turns to frustration with the political powers at Stormont. Meanwhile, first-time older mother Rosie discovers there is no legal remedy to the heartbreaking complications with her pregnancy.

Theresa learns her trial date, but she still hasn't told Orla that she's facing prison for what they did. When Orla discovers the truth, she insists on supporting her mother to challenge the prosecution.

== Cast ==
- Sinéad Keenan as Theresa Ryan, a Catholic stay-at-home mother
- Amy James-Kelly as Hannah Kennedy, a young Protestant newlywed
- Lola Petticrew as Orla Healy, Theresa's 15-year-old daughter from a previous relationship
- Colin Morgan as Jonathan Kennedy, Hannah's husband
- Owen McDonnell as Mark Ryan, Theresa's husband and Orla's stepfather
- Genevieve O'Reilly as Rosie Fortress, a 40-year-old with depression
- Prasanna Puwanarajah as David Fortress, Rosie's English husband
- Vanessa Emme as Rachel Donleavy, Theresa's lawyer
- Ger Ryan as Kathleen Nolan, Theresa's mother
- Kerri Quinn as Louise Byrne, Theresa's friend and an anti-abortion campaigner
- Gráinne Keenan as Jenny Anderson, a pro-choice campaigner
- Dearbhla Molloy as Eileen O'Donnell, a veteran pro-choice campaigner and republican

== Production ==
=== Development ===
Originally titled When It Happens to You, Charlotte Moore and Piers Wenger commissioned the series in 2019 from Studio Lambert for BBC One. Gwyneth Hughes wrote the script and served as an executive producer, and Alex Kalymnios directed. Also executive producing were Susan Hogg and Gaynor Holmes.

Hogg grew up in Northern Ireland herself and wanted to tell this story for a long time. Hughes and the team at Studio Lambert spent months researching. They met with families and individuals affected by its restrictive abortion laws. For the sake of anonymity, names and locations were changed for the series.

=== Casting ===
A press release confirmed the cast about a month before the series aired, with Sinéad Keenan, Lola Petticrew, Amy James-Kelly, and Genevieve O’Reilly featuring as well as Colin Morgan, Owen McDonnell, Kerri Quinn, and Prasanna Puwanarajah.

=== Filming ===
Principal photography took place on location in 2020, and was one of the first UK productions that managed to take place despite the COVID-19 pandemic. Locations included Belfast, Antrim, Whitehead, Ballyhornan, and Ballymena.

== Release ==
A trailer was released on 30 April 2021. The first episode premiered on BBC One on 10 May, and the second on 11 May. In Australia, the drama aired on 9 June on BBC First. Later on 23 November, it premiered in Ireland on RTÉ One.

In 2022, it was announced the drama would have an international release via Sundance Now that 28 July.
