= Walking on Sunshine (film) =

- Directed by: Max Giwa; Dania Pasquini
- Written by: Joshua St Johnson
- Produced by: James Richardson
- Starring: Annabel Scholey; Giulio Berruti; Hannah Arterton; Katy Brand; Leona Lewis
- Cinematography: Philipp Blaubach
- Edited by: Robin Sales
- Music by: Anne Dudley
- Production company: IM Global
- Distributed by: Vertigo Films
- Release date: 27 June 2014
- Running time: 97 minutes
- Country: United Kingdom
- Language: English
- Box office: $4,558,820

Walking on Sunshine is a 2014 British romantic jukebox musical comedy-drama film directed by Max Giwa and Dania Pasquini, and starring Annabel Scholey, Giulio Berruti, Hannah Arterton, Katy Brand and Leona Lewis in her film debut. The film features covers of songs from the 1980s and was released on 27 June 2014. It is also a debut role for singer-songwriter Leona Lewis.

== Plot ==
The opening scene shows Taylor and her boyfriend, Raf, by the sea. Raf wants Taylor to stay with him in Italy, but Taylor wishes to go to university and start her "real life".

Three years later, Taylor goes to the south Italian region of Apulia on holiday ("Holiday") where she meets up with her sister Maddie, who, despite having recently broken up with her boyfriend, tells Taylor ("Venus") that she is getting married in two days. Maddie's friend, Lil, reveals that Taylor had a boyfriend in Apulia on her holiday three years ago, but Taylor explains she doesn't want to rekindle her relationship with him. Taylor goes down to the beach where she is reunited with her friends Mikey, Elena and Enrico. She spots Raf on the beach, and follows him ("How Will I Know?"). He recognizes her and is about to greet her when Maddie runs over and kisses him, revealing that Raf is Maddie's fiancé. In order to protect Maddie, Taylor pretends she doesn't know Raf, Elena, Enrico, or Mikey.

Later on that night the group attends a dinner, where Raf makes a speech about Maddie that brings Taylor to tears, which she disguises. Maddie makes a speech ("The Power of Love"). Taylor goes outside to the bar and Raf follows her, saying that the relationship between them is "weird", which Taylor denies at first but then agrees with. Raf wants to tell Maddie about their relationship three years ago but Taylor refuses, wanting to protect Maddie and to stop her from feeling like a fool.

The next day, Raf and Taylor are sent by Maddie to go and sort out their clothes and also the rings. Raf and Taylor argue about their past relationship and Taylor says she doesn't believe people should "sing from the rooftops", referring to people's feelings. Raf argues that if they do, they really mean it. Elena, Mikey and Enrico overhear and leave. However, when Raf and Taylor step out of the changing cubicles in their wedding outfits it is hinted that they still have feelings for each other.

While this is happening, Doug turns up and surprises Maddie at the market. He tells her he made a mistake by breaking up with her, and wants her back. She declines, but Doug tries to persuade her ("Don't You Want Me"). He follows Maddie back to her house, where she agrees to have dinner with him before her hen party as a "final farewell". Elena and Enrico are discussing Taylor's secret by the pool and Maddie walks in, finding out Elena has a secret. Elena panics and tells her she is pregnant.

Raf and Taylor return from wedding preparations and Maddie asks if Taylor would like a plus one, hinting at her past boyfriend from three years ago. Taylor declines and then finds out about Doug and Maddie's dinner after Doug sends Maddie pink roses with a note saying he can't wait for it, and an argument ensues. The others break up the argument by taking Taylor to the tomato festival ("Walking on Sunshine"). Maddie is left behind to be pampered for her hen night.

After the festival, Raf takes Taylor to the sea to wash off the tomatoes. The sun is setting ("Eternal Flame"). Raf overhears Taylor and the two go to kiss, but Taylor runs away, still thinking about Maddie. Raf chases her as she runs back to the house, and he demands to know if she has any feelings for him and to discuss what happened between them on the beach. Whilst they are arguing, Maddie walks in and her hen party guests led by Elena and Lil surprise them. Taylor is forced to reveal that Raf was her old love from her past Puglia holiday but lies, saying that she has no feelings for him. Raf is hurt, but says the same, to keep his relationship with Maddie strong. Lil kicks Raf out of the hen night and Maddie tells Taylor to change for the party.

The girls go out on the hen night, dressed up ("Girls Just Wanna Have Fun"); the boys do the same ("The Wild Boys"). Taylor leaves the nightclub that the girls are visiting, and sings "It Must Have Been Love", along with Raf who is in a different part of Puglia at his stag do. Taylor realizes she still loves Raf and decides she can't stay in case she destroys Maddie and Raf's relationship. She leaves for the airport in a taxi, throwing a picture of her and Raf out of the taxi window.

Whilst Taylor is leaving, Maddie goes back to her bedroom where Doug is waiting. He says he does not want anything from her but he wants to give his blessing, which Maddie says is "sweet" before she realizes what Doug is doing. She ties Doug up, pretending she is going to have sex with him ("Faith"); instead, she pushes him into the pool. Everything goes silent and Maddie goes to see if he is alright, and Doug is on one knee with an engagement ring, which confuses Maddie.

The morning afterwards, Lil finds Taylor in the airport and offers advice. She says that Taylor must forget her feelings for Raf as her relationship with Maddie is more important. Taylor agrees and the pair get in a taxi to go to the wedding, after Lil realizes they are late. Taylor changes in the taxi. Maddie also wakes up late, hugging a picture of Raf, meaning she turned Doug away. Raf is shown duct taped to a tree next to a nunnery. The cast congregates at the church ("White Wedding"). Maddie and Taylor reconcile before heading inside.

At the altar, the priest asks if anybody objects to Raf and Maddie's marriage, to which Doug stands up, but Maddie tells him to sit down. Maddie then surprises everyone, telling Raf she is in love with love itself rather than him specifically and that he deserves better. Raf leaves the church but Taylor pursues him to apologize ("If I Could Turn Back Time"). When it doesn't work, Taylor runs to the roof and sings to Raf from there, as earlier on in the film Raf said if somebody sings from the rooftops you can tell they mean their feelings. Raf joins Taylor on the roof where Taylor tells Raf she loves him and the two kiss.

Later at the beach, Elena admits to Enrico that she actually is pregnant and Enrico is overjoyed. Lil hints at having feelings for Mikey by kissing him. Maddie and Taylor discuss how Maddie is now alone, but she says she will be fine. Doug interrupts the girls, and Lil and Taylor strap him into a hang glider whilst Maddie distracts him. Lil gives a signal to a boat offshore and Doug is flown up into the air, screaming. The entire cast then perform "Wake Me Up Before You Go-Go" and the film ends.

== Cast ==
- Annabel Scholey as Maddie
- Hannah Arterton as Taylor
- Giulio Berruti as Raf
- Greg Wise as Doug
- Katy Brand as Lil
- Leona Lewis as Elena
- Danny Kirrane as Mikey
- Giulio Corso as Enrico

== Locations ==
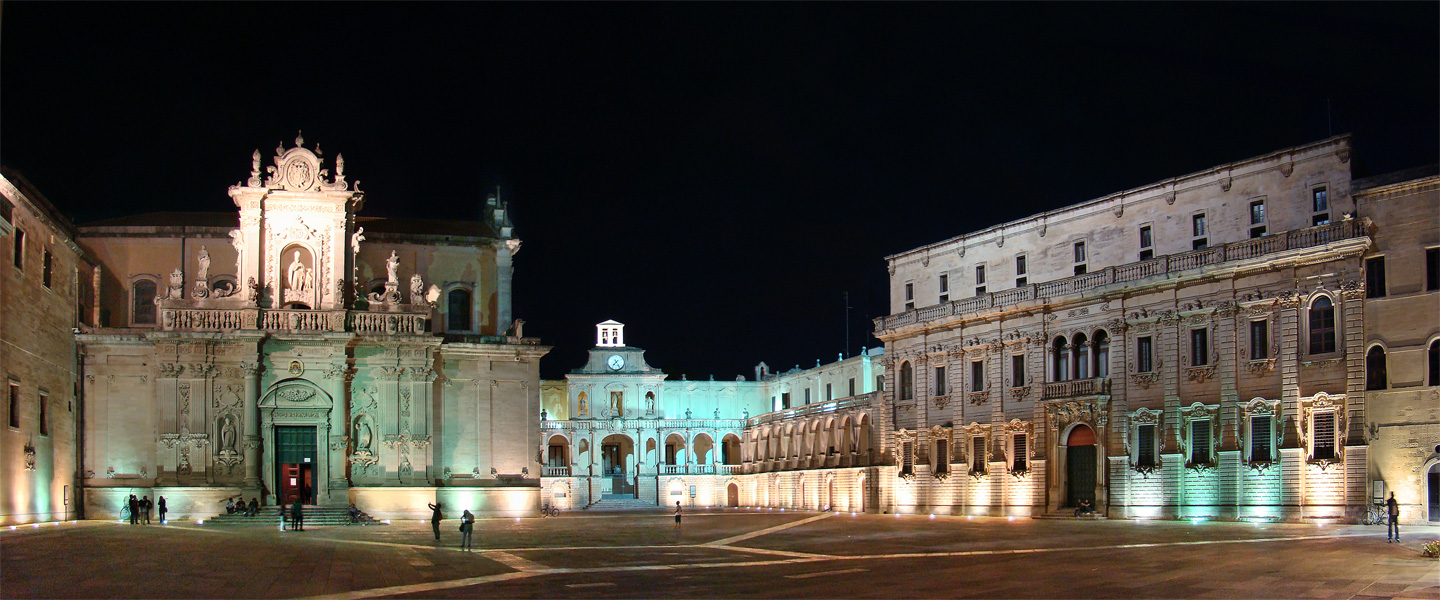
Piazza del Duomo, Lecce, at night.

The film was shot in the Salento region of Apulia, the "heel of the Italian boot". The Piazza del Duomo of Lecce appears in several scenes. Nardò is the location of the Tomatina-inspired tomato festival. Buildings of Presicce also appear. Beach scenes were shot at Lido Coco Loco at Torre San Giovanni

== Release ==
=== Box office ===
Walking on Sunshine opened in 360 theaters on 27 June 2014 and earned $687,345 in its opening weekend. As of 23 July, it has grossed $3,248,671 worldwide.

=== Critical reception ===
The film received negative reviews, currently holding a 33% rating on review aggregator website Rotten Tomatoes based on 24 reviews. The site's consensus states: "It desperately wants to be frothy and fun, but Walking on Sunshine is crass and calculated -- and a poor substitute for the jukebox musicals it attempts to emulate."

== Soundtrack ==
1. "Holiday" (Madonna) - Taylor
2. "Venus" (Shocking Blue)/(Bananarama) - Lil, Maddie, and Taylor
3. "How Will I Know" (Whitney Houston) - Taylor, Mikey, Enrico, and Elena
4. "The Power of Love" (Huey Lewis and the News) - Taylor, Maddie, Lil, Mikey, Enrico, Raf, and Elena
5. "Don't You Want Me" (The Human League) - Doug and Maddie
6. "Walking on Sunshine" (Katrina and the Waves) - Elena, Taylor, Lil, Mikey, Enrico, and Raf
7. "Eternal Flame" (The Bangles) - Taylor
8. "Girls Just Wanna Have Fun"/"The Wild Boys" (Cyndi Lauper/Duran Duran) - Taylor, Maddie, Elena, and Lil / Mikey, Enrico, and Raf
9. "It Must Have Been Love" (Roxette) - Taylor and Raf
10. "Faith" (George Michael) - Maddie and Doug
11. "White Wedding" (Billy Idol) - Lil, Mikey, Maddie, Enrico, Doug, Taylor, Tiziana and Raf
12. "If I Could Turn Back Time" (Cher) - Taylor and Raf
13. "Wake Me Up Before You Go-Go" (Wham!) - Elena, Mikey, Lil, Taylor, Maddie, Enrico, Doug, Tiziana and Raf
