= Hannah Arterton =

British actor and singer (born 1989)

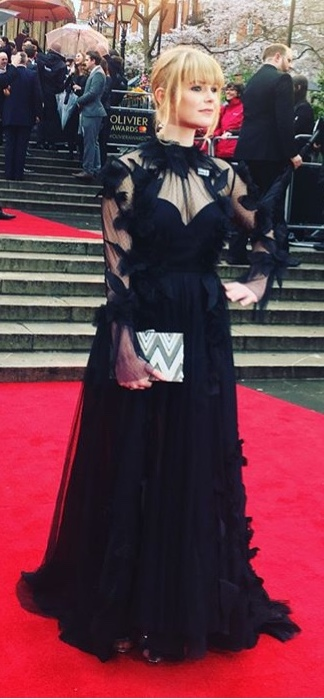
- Arterton in 2018
- Born: Hannah Jane Arterton; 26 January 1989 (age 37); Gravesend, Kent, England
- Education: Royal Academy of Dramatic Art
- Occupations: Actress, singer
- Years active: 2011–present
- Spouse: Chris Hyson
- Children: 1
- Family: Gemma Arterton (sister)

Hannah Jane Hyson (nee Arterton) (born 26 January 1989) is an English actress and singer. She attended Gravesend Grammar School for Girls and graduated from the Royal Academy of Dramatic Art in 2011. She has appeared in the television series The Five (2016) and Safe (2018), and in the film Walking on Sunshine (2014).

== Early life ==
Arterton was born on 26 January 1989 in Gravesend, Kent, England. Her mother Sally-Anne (née Heap) is a cleaner and runs a cleaning business and her father Barry J. Arterton is a metal worker / welder. Her parents divorced during her early childhood with Arterton growing up with her older sister Gemma Arterton and mother in a council estate. She reports being initially drawn to acting at the age of seven after watching a rehearsal of the musical The Wizard of Oz performed by The Miskin Theatre in Dartford. Arterton recalled: "I'd never seen anything like that. I was absolutely blown away... A whole different world just opened up." Her matrilineal great-grandmother was a German-Jewish concert violinist.

Her early education was at the Gravesend Grammar School for Girls. She subsequently studied Performance and Music Technology at North Kent College's Miskin Theatre. While studying there, she provided backing vocals for a skiffle band which resulted in a record deal offer which later collapsed. She commented on the experience: "'Argh, I can't do this. It's too hard to trust people in the music industry. It's full of sharks and guys latching on to a young artist and wanting to make money. I found it all quite scary." A lecturer at The Miskin Theatre subsequently convinced her to apply for the Royal Academy of Dramatic Art (RADA), from which she later graduated in 2011. During her final year at RADA, she was cast by Stephen Poliakoff in his play My City. Also while at RADA, Arterton formed a seven-piece covers band, The Hitmen and Her, for which she is lead singer.

== Career ==
After performing in the play My City (2011) with Tracey Ullman and Tom Riley at the Almeida Theatre, Arterton was cast as Korinna in the BBC television series Atlantis (2013).

Her feature film debut was as a woman caught in a love triangle in the romantic musical Walking on Sunshine (2014). Her performance received generally positive reviews from critics. In the same year, she starred in Hide and Seek (2014), a romantic drama about a polyamorous commune which received the Edinburgh International Film Festival's award for Best British Feature Film.

In 2016, she played a detective in American crime novelist Harlan Coben's television series The Five. Two years later, Arterton reunited with Coben to play detective Emma Castle in Netflix original series Safe. In the same year she appeared in two horror films directed by Paul Hyett, The Convent and Peripheral.

== Personal life ==
Arterton is married to Chris Hyson, a musician and composer. The couple live in South Norwood, London. The couple announced they were expecting their first baby in a public announcement of their pregnancy in august 2026. Arterton gave birth to a baby boy, named Jesse Arthur Hyson on 16 October 2026.

== Filmography ==
Key
†	Denotes films that have not yet been released

=== Television ===
Year(s)	Title	Role	Notes	Ref(s)
2011	Midsomer Murders	Katy	Episode: "A Sacred Trust"	
2013	Atlantis	Korinna	5 episodes	
2015	Doc Martin	Ms. Grappy	Episode: "Education, Education, Education"	
2016	The Five	D.C. Ally Caine	10 episodes	
2017	Versailles	Sister Hermione	Episode: "A Night"	
2018	Safe	D.C. Emma Castle	8 episodes	
2022	The Peripheral	Dee Dee	5 episodes	

=== Film ===
Year	Title	Role	Notes	Ref(s)
2013	At First Sight	Avy	Short film	
2014	Walking on Sunshine	Taylor		
2014	Hide and Seek	Charlotte		
2015	Otherwise Engaged	Megan	Short film	
2015	Burn Burn Burn	Sophie		
2016	Total Loss	Rebecca	Short film	
2018	The Convent	Persephone		
2018	Peripheral	Bobbi Johnson		
2019	Hayley Alien	Shop Manager	Director and writer Short film	
2019	Old Beginnings	Sophia	Short film	
2024	One More Shot	Hooper		
2024	We Are Tourists	Amber		
2025	Bleeding Blue Bird	Night		

=== Radio ===
Year	Title	Role	Notes	Ref(s)
2012	Shout to the Top	Rain		
2014	Queens of Noise	Rain		
2014	The Bone Clocks	Reader	2 episodes	
2015	Born in the DDR	Hanne		

=== Video games ===
Year	Title	Role	Notes	Ref(s)
2015	Final Fantasy XIV: Heavensward	Kan-E-Senna, Meriel		
2017	Final Fantasy XIV: Stormblood	Kan-E-Senna, M'naago Rahz		
2019	Final Fantasy XIV: Shadowbringers	Kan-E-Senna		

== Stage ==
Year	Title	Role	Theatre	Notes	Ref(s)
2011	My City	2011	Almeida Theatre	8 September – 5 November	
