= Hide and Seek (2014 film) =

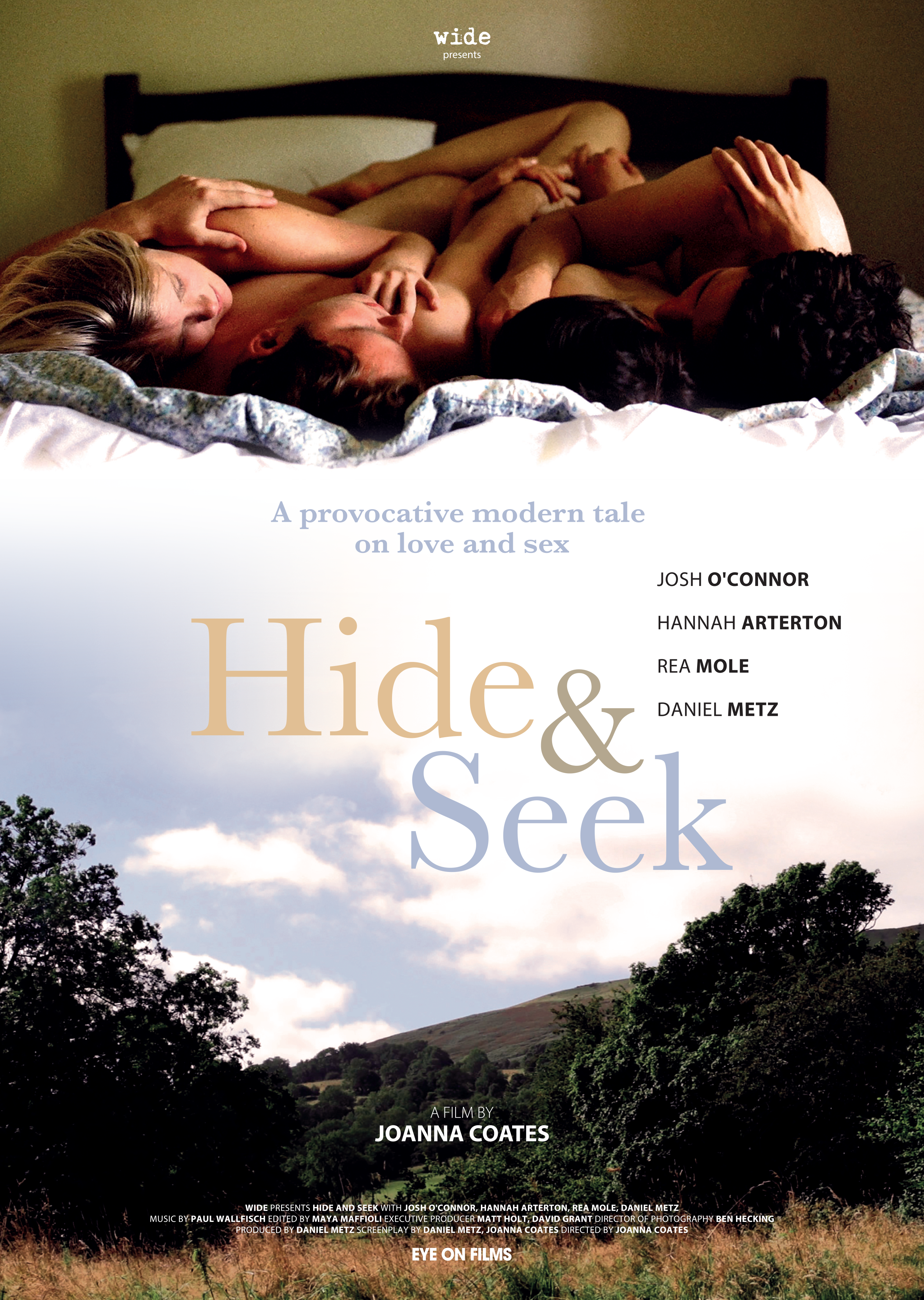
- Theatrical release poster
- Directed by: Joanna Coates
- Written by: Daniel Metz; Joanna Coates
- Produced by: Daniel Metz
- Starring: Josh O'Connor; Hannah Arterton; Rea Mole; Daniel Metz
- Cinematography: Ben Hecking
- Edited by: Maya Maffioli
- Music by: Paul Wallfisch
- Release date: June 20, 2014 (Edinburgh)
- Running time: 81 minutes
- Countries: United Kingdom; United States
- Language: English

Hide and Seek (released as Amorous in the United States) is a 2014 romantic drama film directed by Joanna Coates, who also co-wrote the screenplay with Daniel Metz. An international co-production of the United Kingdom and the United States, it stars Josh O'Connor, Hannah Arterton, Rea Mole and Daniel Metz.

Hide and Seek won the Michael Powell Award at the Edinburgh International Film Festival.

== Plot ==
In an English cottage, four young people from London move in together, seeking to challenge social conventions and their own tolerances by engaging in scheduled partner-swapping. The durability of their new living arrangements is tested by the arrival of an outsider who fails to get in tune with the foursome's radical spirit.

== Cast ==
- Josh O'Connor as Max
- Hannah Arterton as Charlotte
- Rea Mole as Leah
- Daniel Metz as Jack
- Joe Banks as Simon

== Reception ==
On the review aggregator website Rotten Tomatoes, 40% of 5 critics' reviews are positive.

On The Hollywood Reporter, Neil Young wrote that "despite premiering to general shoulder-shrugging at Edinburgh, this insufferably precious chamber piece nevertheless walked away with the Michael Powell Award for best British feature — not the first time a festival jury has favored ambition over execution." On ScreenDaily, Mark Adams wrote that "there are some interesting ideas (...) but in the end it flatters to deceive and never really delivers in terms of drama or radical thinking."
