= Catherine M. Green =

British biologist

Catherine Green OBE
- Education: Gravesend Grammar School for Girls; Churchill College, Cambridge (BA); Imperial Cancer Research Fund (PhD)
- Known for: Biochemistry; Genome sequencing
- Scientific career
- Workplaces: University of Sussex; Curie Institute; University of Oxford
- Thesis: The Rad24 checkpoint protein of Saccharomyces cerevisiae : a complex problem.
- Doctoral advisor: Noel F. Lowndes

Catherine Mary Green is an English biologist who is an associate professor in chromosome dynamics at the Wellcome Centre for Human Genetics at the University of Oxford. Her research considers chromosome stability during the replication of DNA. During the COVID-19 pandemic Green was part of the Oxford team who developed the Oxford–AstraZeneca COVID-19 vaccine.

== Early life and education ==
Green grew up in Gravesend and attended Gravesend Grammar School for Girls. She was an undergraduate at Churchill College, Cambridge, where she has said that her love of science was solidified. After completing part II of the Natural Sciences Tripos and herewith obtaining a BA degree from Cambridge, Green was awarded an Imperial Cancer Research Fund (now Cancer Research UK) scholarship for her doctoral research. Green studied damaged DNA in yeast at the Clare Hall laboratories. After earning her PhD degree from the University College London in 2000, Green moved to the Curie Institute, where she studied DNA damage in human cells as a Marie Curie Fellow. Upon returning to the United Kingdom Green was appointed to the University of Sussex, where she studied DNA damage due to sunlight exposure.

== Research and career ==
Green was made a Cancer Research UK Research Fellow in the Department of Zoology at the University of Cambridge in 2008. She held a Kaye Research Fellowship at Christ's College, Cambridge. Her research considered the mechanisms of genome replication at the genetic and epigenetic levels. During this replication process the mutations that are responsible for cancer can occur, or be fixed. Understanding the process that underpins this replication, and how cells control this replication, allows Green to better understand the development of cancer.

In 2012 Green moved to the University of Oxford, where she joined the Wellcome Centre for Human Genetics. Here Green expanded her work in genomics to encompass the genetic and epigenetic stability of DNA. Green was made Monsanto Senior Research Fellow at Exeter College, Oxford in 2017. She leads the core facility in Chromosome Dynamics at the Wellcome Centre.

During the COVID-19 pandemic Green was part of the Jenner Institute team who developed a coronavirus disease vaccine. The Jenner Institute vaccination platform had been prepared for the MERS and SARS outbreaks, and so was ready to respond quickly to the emerging disease. Green worked with Sarah Gilbert on the production of the ChAdOx1 nCoV-19 vaccination. The team started research in January 2020, and managed to identify a chimpanzee adenovirus vector (ChAdOx) that generated a strong immune response to SARS-CoV-2. They used the SARS-CoV-2 genome that had been sequenced by researchers in Wuhan. The adenovirus cannot replicate, so does not cause further infection, and instead acts as a vector to transfer the SARS-CoV-2 spike protein. The spike protein, an external protein that enables the virus to enter cells, is responsible for the immune system response. In early April the team were awarded £22 million of funding from the Government of the United Kingdom to run human trials. The vaccine underwent clinical trials in Oxford in April 2020, which were successful. On 30 December 2020, the vaccine was approved for use in the UK. More than 3 billion doses of the vaccine were supplied to countries worldwide.

In 2021, Green and Sarah Gilbert published Vaxxers: the inside story of the Oxford AstraZeneca vaccine and the race against the virus.

== Honours and awards ==
Green was awarded an Honorary Doctorate of Engineering (DEng) by the University of Bath in December 2022. The award recognised her as a 'world-renowned biologist, whose work on developing a COVID-19 vaccine helped save millions of lives worldwide.'

== Selected publications ==
Green has an h-index of 51 according to Google Scholar. Her publications include:

- Bienko, Marzena; Green, Catherine M.; Crosetto, Nicola; Rudolf, Fabian; Zapart, Grzegorz; Coull, Barry; Kannouche, Patricia; Wider, Gerhard; Peter, Matthias; Lehmann, Alan R.; Hofmann, Kay (16 December 2005). "Ubiquitin-Binding Domains in Y-Family Polymerases Regulate Translesion Synthesis". Science. 310 (5755): 1821–1824. Bibcode:2005Sci...310.1821B. doi:10.1126/science.1120615. ISSN 0036-8075. PMID 16357261. S2CID 10666348.
- Lehmann, Alan R.; Niimi, Atsuko; Ogi, Tomoo; Brown, Stephanie; Sabbioneda, Simone; Wing, Jonathan F.; Kannouche, Patricia L.; Green, Catherine M. (1 July 2007). "Translesion synthesis: Y-family polymerases and the polymerase switch". DNA Repair. Replication Fork Repair Processes. 6 (7): 891–899. doi:10.1016/j.dnarep.2007.02.003. ISSN 1568-7864. PMID 17363342.
- Gilbert, Christopher S; Green, Catherine M; Lowndes, Noel F (1 July 2001). "Budding Yeast Rad9 Is an ATP-Dependent Rad53 Activating Machine". Molecular Cell. 8 (1): 129–136. doi:10.1016/S1097-2765(01)00267-2. hdl:10379/9215. ISSN 1097-2765. PMID 11511366.
- Gilbert, Sarah; Green, Catherine (2021). Vaxxers: the inside story of the Oxford AstraZeneca vaccine and the race against the virus. London: Hodder & Stoughton. ISBN 9781529369854.
