= Madeleine Bunting =

English writer (born 1964)

- Born: March 1964 (age 61–62); Oswaldkirk, North Yorkshire, England
- Other name: Madeleine Clare J. Bunting
- Education: Corpus Christi College, Cambridge
- Occupation: Writer
- Parent(s): Romola Jane (Farquharson) and John Bunting
- Website: madeleinebunting.com

Madeleine Clare J. Bunting (born March 1964) is an English writer. She was formerly an associate editor and columnist at The Guardian newspaper. She has written six works of non-fiction and two novels. She is a regular broadcaster for the BBC. Her most recent series of essays for BBC Radio 3 was on the idea of Home, and was broadcast in March 2020. Previous series of essays include "Are You Paying Attention?" (2018), "The Crisis of Care" (2016) and "The Retreating Roar" (2014), on the loss of faith.

== Life and career ==
=== Early life and education ===
Bunting was born Clare Bunting in Oswaldkirk, North Yorkshire, England, the daughter of Romola Jane (née Farquharson) and sculptor John Bunting, who taught drawing at the Catholic independent school Ampleforth College. Her ancestry is English, Irish, Scottish, and, through her maternal grandmother, Ashkenazi and Sephardi Jewish. The fourth of five children, Madeleine was the youngest daughter from John and Romola's marriage; the couple separated in 1978. She was educated at Richmond Convent, North Yorkshire, and Brighton, Hove & Sussex VI Form College, followed by Corpus Christi College, Cambridge, and then Harvard University, where Bunting read history, and received a Knox postgraduate fellowship to study politics and to teach.

=== Journalism ===
After a period working for Brook Productions (1988–89) Bunting joined The Guardian newspaper in 1990. Her posts at the newspaper over the years were as a news reporter, leader writer, religious affairs editor, associate editor and, for twelve years a columnist.

Bunting was appointed director of the London-based think tank Demos in June 2006 but resigned shortly after, owing to differences with the trustees.

Bunting returned to The Guardian and wrote a history of an area where she grew up. Bunting left The Guardian in 2013.

=== Books ===
==== The Model Occupation ====
Her first book The Model Occupation: The Channel Islands under German Rule, published in 1995, was praised as "thoroughly unflinching, fair-minded, humane and sensitive" (Paul Johnson, Evening Standard). Another review by the historian Norman Stone said: "Bunting is a superb chronicler of what happened... if you want a classic example of the dilemmas of Resistance, here it is." Yet the book was also highly controversial in that the author accused the islanders of passive collaboration with German occupying forces, implying that officials "helped identify Jews" for deportation to their deaths, which constituted a "shameful wartime past". Historian Hazel R. Knowles Smith has described Bunting's research as "just plain wrong", while X writes that it is "impossible to overstate" the outrage caused by Bunting's allegations.

Bunting repeated these claims in an article for The Guardian in January 2004 when the book was republished, stating: "My book The Model Occupation played a modest part in the process, stirring up furious controversy on the islands."

==== The Plot ====
The Plot was published by Granta Books in 2009. The book traces how humans have used one acre of land on the edge of the North York moors over thousands of years right up to the present day, including her own family's use of the land. It is partly an account of the War Memorial Chapel her father built on the acre as well as a history of an area of great natural beauty and rich history. The book was shortlisted for the Royal Society of Literature's Ondaatje Prize in 2010 and won the Portico Prize.

==== Other books ====
In 2004, Bunting published Willing Slaves, an analysis of the role of overwork in British culture.

In 2016, she published Love Of Country: A Hebridean Journey, concerning the relationship between England and Scotland through the prism of a series of journeys through the Hebrides. It was BBC Radio 4's Book of the Week and was widely praised in reviews, including in The New Statesman, The Scotsman and The Guardian. Love Of Country was also shortlisted for the Golden Beer Wainwright Prize and The Saltire Society Prize.

In April 2019, Bunting published her first novel, Island Song, which won the Waverton Good Read Award for a debut novel.

In October 2020, she published Labours of Love, The Crisis of Care, followed by Ceremony of Innocence (2022) and The Seaside: England's Love Affair (2023).

=== Views ===
As a columnist, Bunting wrote on a wide range of subjects from religion to politics, social change and global development. She was well known for opposition to the invasion of Afghanistan and Iraq, she played a key role in drawing new voices into the media from the British Muslim community and won a Commission for Racial Equality award for her work in this area. She won several One World media awards for her work on global inequality and development. She was also known for her advocacy of religious belief from a liberal position and her rejection of atheism; she argues that new atheists' antipathy to religion makes it impossible for them to criticise it effectively. She was awarded a Lambeth degree by the Archbishop of Canterbury in 2006 in recognition of her journalism. In 2013, she received an honorary fellowship from Cardiff University.

As a columnist, Bunting was critical of abuse committed within the Catholic Church in Ireland and elsewhere in the world. She believes the moral authority of the Roman Catholic Church is irreversibly compromised.

== Personal life ==
Bunting is married to Simon Robey and has three children. She was formerly married to Patrick Wintour of The Guardian.

== Bibliography ==
=== Non-fiction ===
- The Model Occupation: The Channel Islands Under German Rule, 1940-45, HarperCollins (1995), ISBN 0-00-255242-6, (reprint (2004) Pimlico, ISBN 1-84413-086-X)
- Willing Slaves: How the Overwork Culture is Ruling Our Lives, HarperCollins (2004), ISBN 978-0-00-716372-4
- The Plot: A Biography of an English Acre, Granta Books (2009), ISBN 978-1-84708-085-1
- Love Of Country: A Hebridean Journey, Granta Books (2016), ISBN 978-1847085177
- Labours of Love, The Crisis of Care, Granta Books (2020), ISBN 9781783783793
- The Seaside: England's Love Affair, Granta Books (2023), ISBN 978-1783787173

=== Fiction ===
- Island Song – novel, Granta Books (2019), ISBN 9781783784615
- Ceremony of Innocence – novel, Granta Books (2022), ISBN 9781783787500
