= Martine =

- Gender: Female

Martine is a feminine given name and a surname.

== Given name ==
- Martine Aubry (born 1950), French politician
- Martine Audet (born 1961), Canadian poet
- Martine Aurillac (born 1939), French politician
- Martine Baay-Timmerman (born 1958), Dutch politician
- Martine Bartlett (1925–2006), American actress
- Martine Batchelor (born 1953), author and former Buddhist nun
- Martine Beaugrand, Canadian politician
- Martine Bellen, American poet, editor and librettist
- Martine Bercher (1944–2005), American football player
- Martine Bertereau (c. 1600–after 1642), pioneering French woman mining engineer and mineralogist, also known as Baroness de Beausoleil
- Martine Berthet (born 1961), French politician
- Martine Beswick (born 1941), English actress and model
- Martine Beugnet, French film theorist
- Martine Billard (born 1952), French politician
- Martine Brochard (1944–2025), French actress and writer
- Martine Brunschwig Graf (born 1950), Swiss politician
- Martine Buron (born 1944), French architect and politician
- Martine Carol (1920–1967), French actress
- Martine Carrillon-Couvreur (born 1948), French politician
- Martine Coulombe, Canadian politician first elected in 2010
- Martine Croxall (born 1969), British journalist and television news presenter
- Martine Dennis (born 1961), British news anchor
- Martine Djibo (died 2022), Ivorian educator and politician
- Martine Etienne (born 1956), French politician
- Martine Faure (born 1948), French politician
- Martine Franck (1938–2012), Belgian photographer
- Martine Gaillard (born 1971), Canadian television sportscaster
- Martine L. Jacquot (born 1955), French-born Canadian academic, novelist, poet, short story writer, journalist
- Martine Janssen (born 1977), Dutch former swimmer
- Martine Kempf, French scientist
- Martine Le Moignan (born 1962), English former professional squash player
- Martine Leavitt, American-Canadian author of young adult novels
- Martine Leguille-Balloy (born 1957), French politician
- Martine Lignières-Cassou (born 1952), French politician
- Martine Locke, Australian singer, songwriter and guitarist
- Martine Martinel (born 1953), French politician
- Martine McCutcheon (born 1976), English singer, television personality and actress
- Martine Murray (born 1965), Australian author and illustrator
- Martine Nida-Rümelin (born 1957), German philosopher
- Martine Ohr (born 1964), Dutch field hockey striker
- Martine Ouellet (born 1969), Canadian politician
- Martine Patenaude (born 1974), Canadian ice dancer
- Martine Piccart (born 1953), Belgian medical doctor, professor and President of the European Organisation for Research and Treatment of Cancer
- Martine Pinville (born 1958), French politician
- Martine Reicherts (born 1957), Luxembourgian politician
- Martine Rothblatt (born 1954 as Martin Rothblatt), American transgender lawyer, author and entrepreneur
- Martine Roure (born 1948), French politician
- Martine St. Clair (born 1962), Canadian singer
- Martine Syms (born 1988), American artist
- Martine Tabeaud (born 1951), French climatologist
- Martine Taelman (born 1965), Belgian politician
- Martine van der Velde (born 1989), Dutch politician
- Martine van Hamel (born 1945), Dutch prima ballerina
- Martine Vassal (born 1962), French politician
- Martine Vik Magnussen, (1985-2008), Norwegian student murdered in London, England
- Martine Wolff (born 1996), Norwegian handball player
- Martine Wonner (born 1964), French politician

== Surname ==
- George Martine (historian) (1635–1712), Scottish historian
- George Martine (physician) (1700–1741), Scottish physician
- James Edgar Martine (1850-1925), American politician and US Senator from New Jersey
- Layng Martine Jr., American country music singer and songwriter
- Randolph B. Martine (1844–1895), American lawyer and politician
- Stéphane Martine (born 1978), French footballer
- Tucker Martine (born 1972), American record producer, musician and composer

== Fictional characters ==
- Martine (character), main character of a series of Belgian books for children
- Martine Gabrielle de Polignac (Lady Oscar), in the shōjo manga/anime The Rose of Versailles

== See also ==
- Alphonse de Lamartine
- Martin (disambiguation)
- Martyn (disambiguation)
