= Jeppe Rønde =

Danish filmmaker (born 1973)

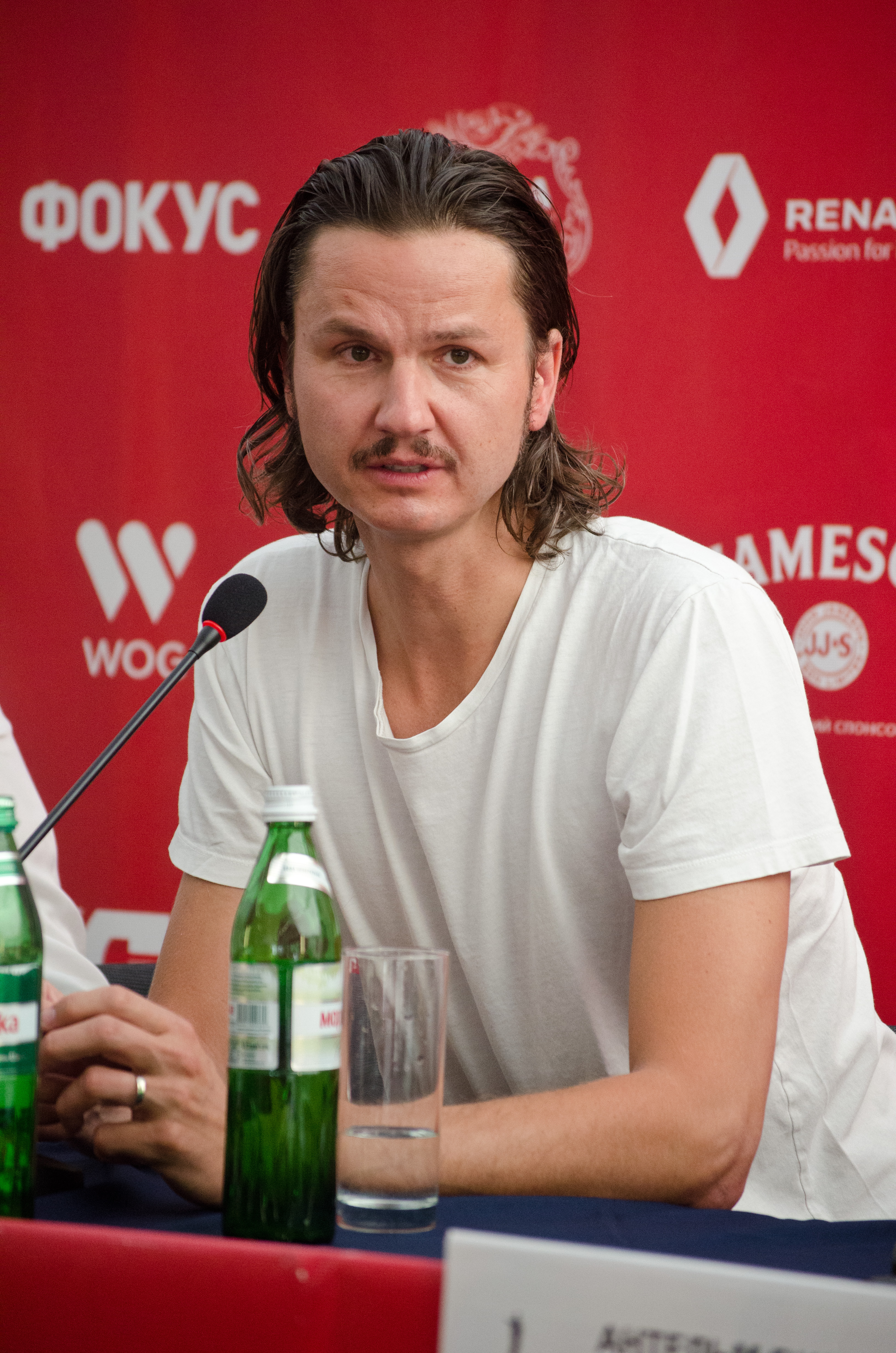
- Jeppe Rønde at the Odesa International Film Festival
- Born: 1973 (age 52–53); Aarhus, Denmark
- Education: University of Copenhagen
- Awards: Robert Award for Best Documentary Feature Cannes Lion

Jeppe Rønde (born 1973) is a Danish filmmaker.

== Career ==
Rønde was born in Aarhus, Denmark and worked as a professional musician until he graduated in Film Studies and Art History from the University of Copenhagen in 2002.

In 2003, he directed his first feature documentary "Jerusalem My Love" (Danish: Jerusalem, min elskede). His next documentary "The Swenkas" (2004) was nominated for the European Film Award for Best Documentary and won the Robert Award for Best Documentary Feature ("Danish Oscars"). After that Rønde directed a critically acclaimed eight episodes TV-series called "The Quatraro Mystery" (Danish: Quatraro Mysteriet) for the Danish national channel DR2.

In 2010, Rønde was voted best commercial director in Denmark. In 2013, he won two Cannes Lions, gold and bronze, for direction and cinematography.

In 2015, he released his first fiction feature film "Bridgend" starring Hannah Murray. The film is about the Bridgend suicide incidents. Rønde allegedly spent six years travelling to and from Bridgend for doing research on the topic. Many parts in the film are played by locals, and they were not trained actors. The movie received multiple nominations and awards internationally but was viewed in Wales as sensationalist, lacking truth and exploitative.

== Filmography ==
- Jerusalem My Love (2003; Danish: Jerusalem, min elskede)
- The Senkas (2004)
- The Quatraro Mystery (2009; Danish: Quatraro Mysteriet)
- Bridgend (2015)
- The Great European Cigarette Mystery (2017; The John Dalli Mystery)
- Almost Human (2019)
