= Lindsay Stringer =

English academic and geographer

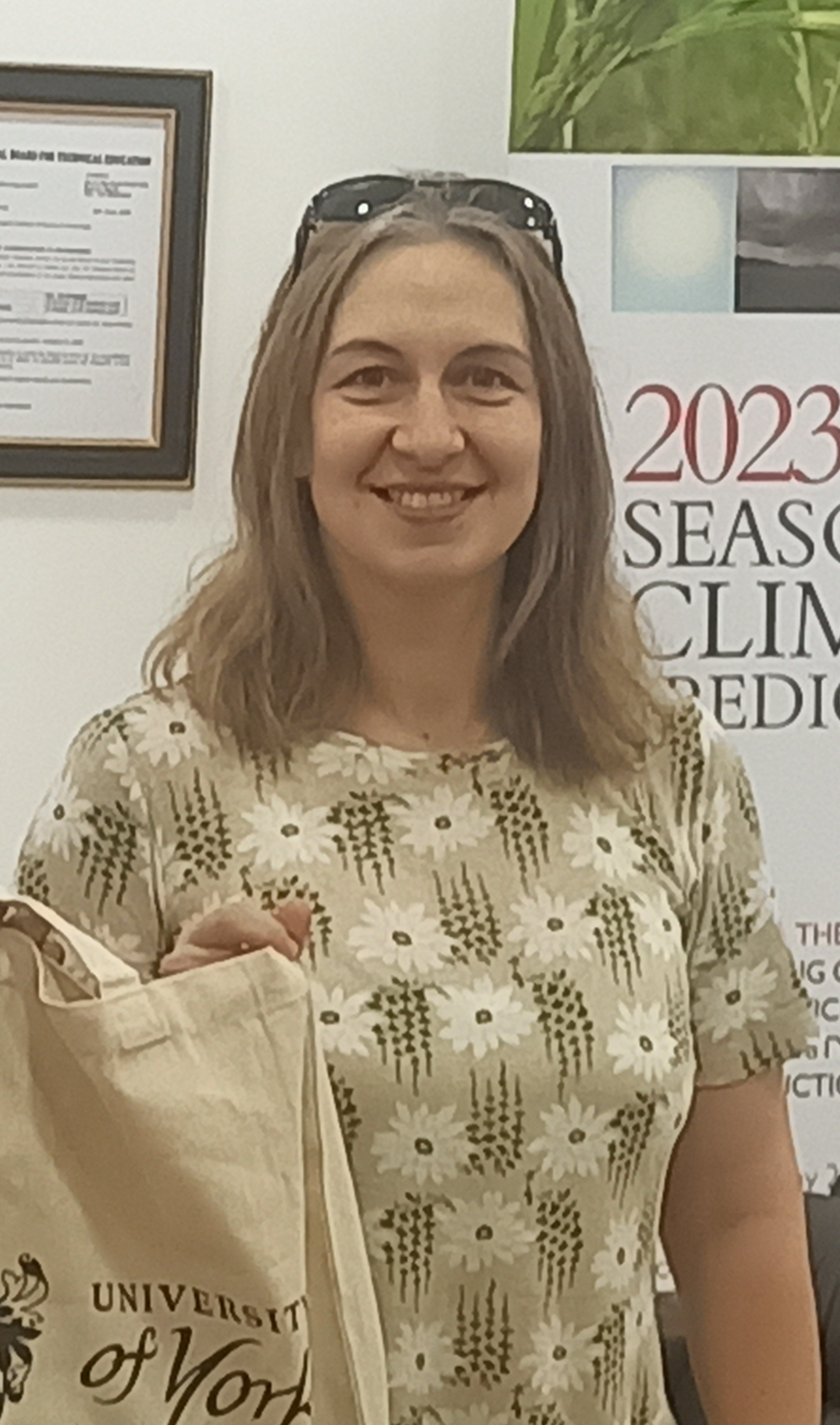
Picture of Lindsay Stringer

Lindsay C. Stringer is an academic and geographer who is professor in environment and development at the University of York, England.

Stringer's research is interdisciplinary and uses theories and methods from both the natural and social sciences to understand human-environment relationships, feedbacks and trade-offs, examining the impacts for human wellbeing, equity and the environment.

== Education ==
- PhD in Geography, University of Sheffield, Department of Geography, 2005
- MSc in Environmental Monitoring and Assessment in Drylands, University of Sheffield Department of Geography, 2001
- BSc in Physical Geography, University of Sheffield Department of Geography, 2000

== Career ==
Stringer has been involved in research on land, food, water, energy and climate change since 2005.

She chaired the Independent International Task Force for the Dryland Systems Programme of the Consultative Group on International Agricultural Research (CGIAR) from 2014 to 2016.

She was an Intergovernmental Panel on Climate Change (IPCC) lead author for the Special Report on Climate Change and Land Use.

She is IPCC lead author for the IPCC Sixth Assessment Report (AR6) as well as Coordinating Lead Author for the IPCC AR6 cross-chapter paper on Deserts, Desertification and Semi-arid Areas.

She was Coordinating Lead Author for the Intergovernmental science-policy Platform on Biodiversity and Ecosystem Services (IPBES) Africa Regional Assessment, and Lead Author for the IPBES Land Degradation and Restoration Assessment.

Stringer is involved in the Economics of Land Degradation (ELD) Initiative, as well as being an Elected Steering Committee Member for DesertNet International.

She was selected for the international Homeward Bound expedition to Antarctica: a women in climate science leadership programme in 2016.

She was Director of the Sustainability Research Institute (SRI) at the School of Earth and Environment, University of Leeds, UK from 2011–2014.

She is the Director of York Environmental Sustainability Institute (YESI). The centre was set up by the University of York to facilitate and deliver interdisciplinary research in environmental sustainability.

She is a member of Centre for Dryland Agriculture’s International Scientific Advisory Board, Bayero University Kano.

== Prizes ==
- Royal Society Wolfson Research Merit Award, 2017
- Women of Achievement Award, 2015
- Philip Leverhulme Prize for advancing sustainability in the world's drylands, 2013
