= Bridgend suicide incidents =

Series of suicides in the Bridgend area of Wales during 2007-08

At least 26 suicides of young people were reported in Bridgend County Borough in South Wales in 2007 and 2008. Reports speculated that a "suicide cult" was to blame, though police found no evidence to link the cases together. Of the suicides, all but one died from hanging.

Many of the suicides were teenagers between the ages of 13 and 17. The parents of one of the dead accused the media of "glamorising ways of taking one's life to young people". Madeleine Moon, Member of Parliament for Bridgend, said that the media were "now part of the problem". The mother of one of the deceased added: "We have lost our son and the media reporting of this has made it more unbearable".

In the years between 1996 and 2006, an average of three men ended their own lives in Bridgend every year. In 2007, the total was believed to be at least nine. On 12 January 2010, it was reported that another two people had died by suicide in the town.

In 2010 police asked the media to stop covering the suicides in an attempt to prevent copycat suicides. Bridgend is a former market town of around 39,000 people; however, the suicides stretched over the whole of Bridgend County Borough, which had a population of over 130,000. The Office for National Statistics reported that the rate of suicides, averaged across England and Wales in 2010, was 11.1 per 100,000 people per year, with Wales having the highest suicide rates at 14.6 per 100,000.

A 2013 documentary and a 2015 drama film were made about these incidents, both called Bridgend. The 2015 film was viewed in Wales as sensationalist, exploitative and lacking in truth, in that it showed local youths screaming out to their dead friends in the misty woods, skinny dipping en masse and revelling in regular underage drinking.
