= Ironclad (film) =

- UK theatrical release poster
- Directed by: Jonathan English
- Screenplay by: Jonathan English; Erick Kastel; Stephen McDool
- Story by: Jonathan English
- Produced by: Rick Benattar; Jonathan English; Andrew J. Curtis
- Starring: James Purefoy; Brian Cox; Derek Jacobi; Kate Mara; Paul Giamatti; Vladimir Kulich
- Cinematography: David Eggby
- Edited by: Peter Amundson
- Music by: Lorne Balfe
- Production companies: VIP Medienfonds 4; Rising Star; Silver Reel; Premiere Picture; The Wales Creative IP Fund; ContentFilm International; Molinare; Perpetual Media Capital; Mythic International Entertainment
- Distributed by: Warner Bros. Pictures (United Kingdom); ARC Entertainment (United States)
- Release dates: 4 March 2011 (United Kingdom); 26 July 2011 (United States)
- Running time: 105 minutes
- Countries: United Kingdom; United States; Germany
- Language: English
- Budget: $25 million
- Box office: $5.1 million

Ironclad is a 2011 action historical drama film directed by Jonathan English. Written by English and Erick Kastel, based on a screenplay by Stephen McDool, the cast includes James Purefoy, Brian Cox, Kate Mara, Paul Giamatti, Vladimir Kulich, Mackenzie Crook, Jason Flemyng, Derek Jacobi, and Charles Dance. The film chronicles the siege of Rochester Castle by King John in 1215. The film was shot entirely in Wales in 2009 and produced on a budget of $25 million.

== Plot ==
A prologue describes how the barons of England, aided by the Knights Templar, fought against the tyrannical King John in a war that lasted more than three years. The war ended with King John signing Magna Carta, a document granting rights to all English freemen. John regrets signing the Magna Carta and in retaliation hires an army of pagan Danish mercenaries under the leadership of warlord Tiberius to restore his absolute authority.

The Abbot Marcus leads three Templar knights on a pilgrimage to Canterbury and they take shelter from the rain at Darnay Castle. One of the knights, Thomas Marshall, is assured by the abbot that Marshall's release from the Templar Order will be sought at Canterbury. By morning, King John arrives at the castle with his army and mercenaries. Baron Darnay had signed the Magna Carta, and in retribution John orders him hanged. The Abbot attempts to intervene and the King orders that the abbot's tongue be cut off. Marshall and the two other knights fight the Danes, during which Marshall escapes the castle on horseback carrying the abbot; the two knights left behind are slain. The abbot dies of his wound, and Marshall breaks his vow of silence to swear that his sacrifice will not be in vain.

Once he has reached Canterbury, Marshall meets with Archbishop Langton, the author of the Magna Carta, and Baron William d'Aubigny, a former soldier turned wool merchant. Langton reveals that the Pope has sided with King John and that he himself is to be excommunicated for writing the Magna Carta. The three men agree that John must be stopped and that the place to do so is Rochester Castle, the seat of Baron Cornhill and a stronghold that controls southern England and allows access to London and the rest of the country.

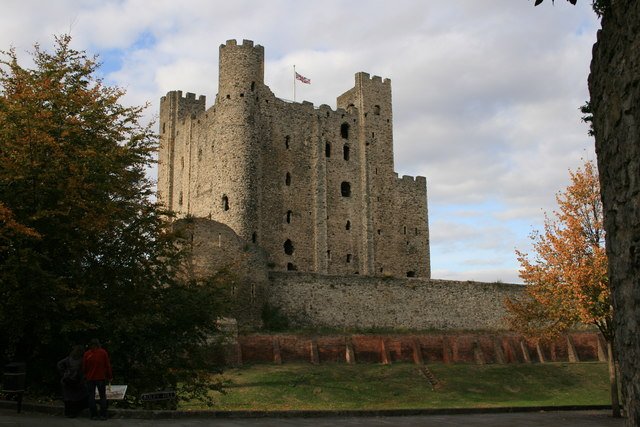
Rochester Castle

d'Aubigny persuades three of his men to join him, including his squire, Guy, and a petty criminal named Jedediah, but a fourth turns down the baron's call to arms. A party of seven finally leaves for Rochester where, on arriving, they discover several Danish mercenaries have already claimed the castle; the fourth man had betrayed them to the king. Aubigny's party fights and kills the Danes, and then claims Rochester Castle in the name of the rebellion, much to the displeasure of Cornhill. When John's army finally arrives and lays siege to Rochester, the garrison holds fast and manages to beat the initial Danish assault. In the aftermath, Aubigny offers his men leave if they wish; none accept.

A second assault sees the Danes' siege tower destroyed by a trebuchet crafted by the defenders from within. John's forces then attempt to starve out the defenders. The Archbishop is informed that Prince Louis is biding his time in France and negotiating with John, and sets off to expedite affairs. As the season turns to winter, the hunger of the castle's occupants continues; Marshall leaves the castle under cover of night and then returns ahead of his pursuers with food stolen from the Danish camp. Morale is bolstered by Marshall's act and gives in to the advances of Cornhill's young wife, Isabel, breaking his Templar vows.

Tiberius, threatened by John to take the castle or risk the King reneging on their bargain, adopts a different approach in his next attack and manages to sneak a small force of men over the walls before dawn to open the gates from within. Guy discovers them and sounds the alarm, but Tiberius leads the charge into the castle grounds while his Danes slaughter the garrison. During the chaos, d'Aubigny is wounded and left behind. Marshall recovers in time to don his knight's battle armour and charge the Danes on his war-horse, buying time for the survivors to pull back to the keep.

Aubigny is dragged before the King and forced to watch as the hands of two prisoners are chopped off. After a defiant verbal exchange with John, he is subjected to the same fate and then hurled by the castle trebuchet into a keep wall. Cornhill tries to surrender but is stopped; he goes instead upstairs to his bedroom and hangs himself. John's engineers have been preparing a mine under the keep's foundation. They have a herd of pigs brought and put in the mine which is then stoked, set afire and the animal fat used to damage the keep's foundation, causing it to collapse; as the keep's walls come down, the final assault begins.

The last defenders are killed except Guy, Isabel, and Marshall, the latter knocked unconscious by falling rubble. Guy goes out to die fighting where he encounters Tiberius and is almost killed, until a recovered Marshall intervenes and Marshall triumphs after a savage duel. Horns are heard in the distance as the combined English rebel and French army arrives last, and John and the remaining Danes disperse in panic. Marshall meets Prince Louis and Archbishop Langton at the castle gates; the latter tells him that he is now free of the Templar Order. Acknowledging England's new king with a nod, Marshall rides off with Isabel, while Guy tells his dead baron that "We held".

The epilogue describes King John's death during his retreat and the reconstruction of Rochester Castle, and how it, like the Magna Carta, still endures.

== Cast ==
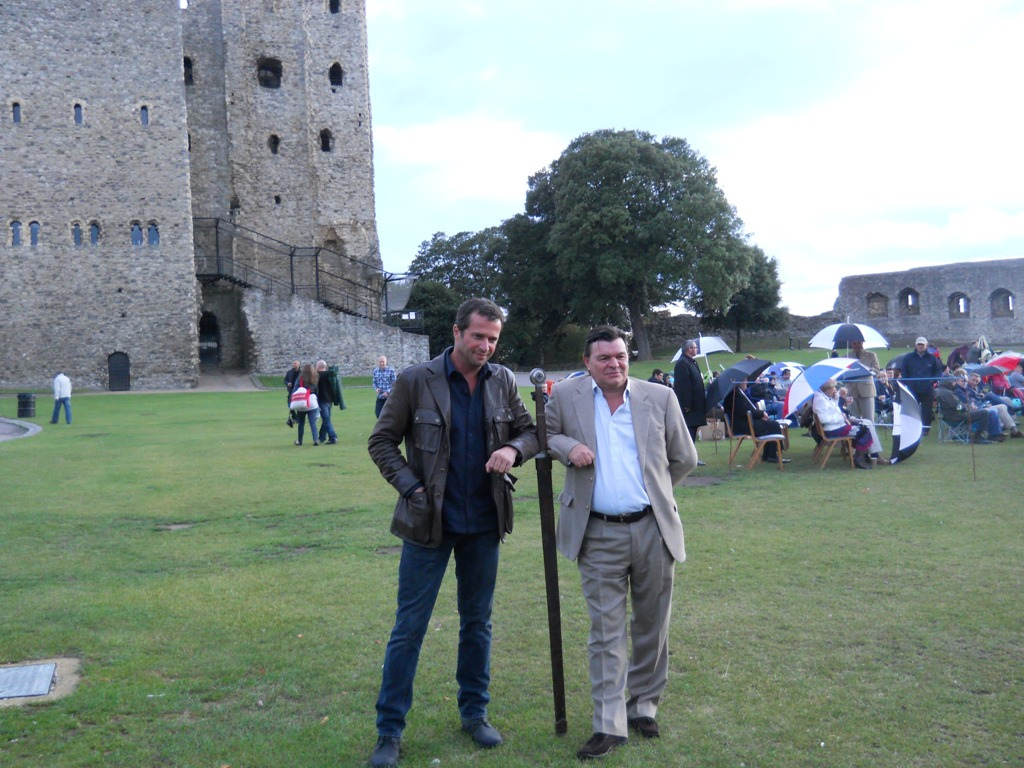
James Purefoy and Jamie Foreman at a 2011 screening of Ironclad at Rochester Castle

- James Purefoy as Marshall, a disillusioned Templar Knight and former Crusader who seeks release from his Order
- Brian Cox as Albany, an ennobled wool merchant who opposes King John's tyranny
- Derek Jacobi as Cornhill, lord of Rochester Castle
- Kate Mara as Isabel, Cornhill's young and neglected wife
- Paul Giamatti as King John
- Jason Flemyng as Becket, a nihilistic warrior and one of Albany's mercenaries
- Jamie Foreman as Coteral, a prisoner freed by Albany to join the rebellion
- Aneurin Barnard as Guy, Albany's idealistic young squire
- Mackenzie Crook as Marks, an expert archer and one of Albany's mercenaries
- Vladimir Kulich as Tiberius, captain of King John's Danish mercenaries
- Charles Dance as Archbishop Langton
- Rhys Parry Jones as Wulfstan, a brutish warrior and one of Albany's mercenaries
- Annabelle Apsion as Maddy
- Bree Condon as Agnes
- Daniel O'Meara as Phipps, captain of the Rochester Castle garrison
- David Melville as Baron Darnay, lord of Darnay Castle and a supporter of the rebellion
- Guy Siner as Oaks

== Production ==
Megan Fox was attached to the film when the film's production company, Mythic, began promoting it to investors at the 2008 Cannes Film Festival. Fox left the film and was later replaced by Kate Mara. Due to the decreased amount of credit and financing available in 2009, the budget of the film was reduced and the entire supporting cast was changed, with the exception of James Purefoy and Paul Giamatti. Producer Andrew Curtis described the financing of the film as "more complex than a London Underground map" to Variety magazine; the film ended up crediting 18 executive producers.

Principal photography for the film began at Dragon International Film Studios near the village Llanharan in Wales on 9 October 2009. A replica of Rochester Castle was built on the studio complex. Producer Rick Benattar strove to make the film as historically accurate as possible, recreating the historical violent siege of Rochester Castle, and letting viewers experience the battle as if they were there. Ironclad was the largest independent production that has been filmed in Wales, and was among the largest independent films shot in Britain in 2009.

== Fictional elements ==
The film is only loosely based on reality. d'Aubigny commanded the garrison but contemporary chroniclers do not agree on how many men it consisted of. Estimates range from 95 to 140 knights supported by crossbowmen, sergeants, and others. John did take the castle, most of the higher nobles being imprisoned or banished; and the French did not arrive in England until some six months after the siege had ended. Characters departing significantly from the historical record include d'Aubigny, who was not an ennobled wool merchant (nor was he tortured and killed in the siege).

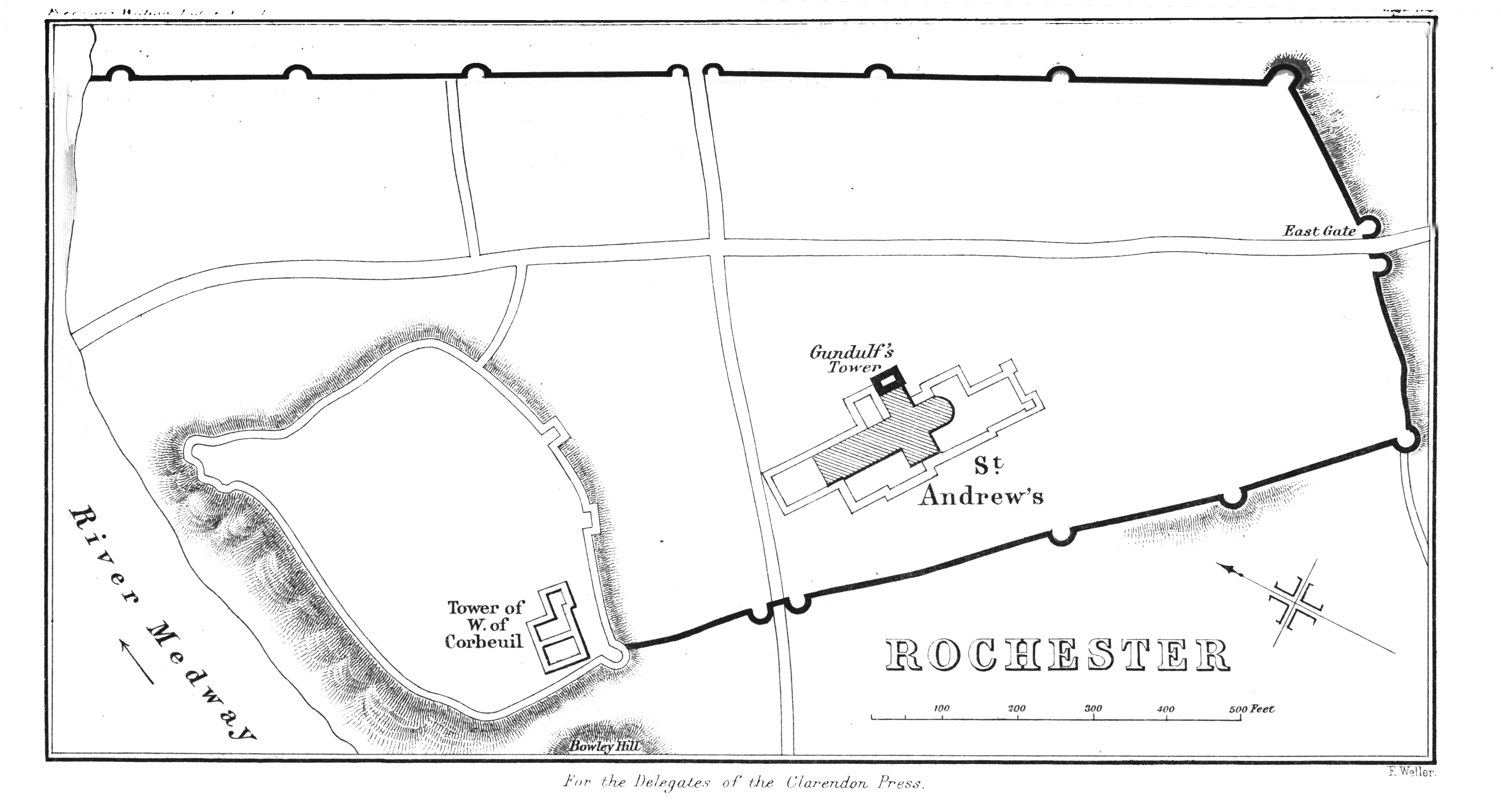
19th century map of medieval Rochester showing the proximity of the castle, cathedral and city

The closing narration explains that this was one of the first victories that the French had that would eventually lead to total victory. However, not mentioned in the narration was that after John's death in 1216, many of the English rebels preferred a weak English king in the person of nine-year-old Henry III over an experienced French monarch and thus rallied around Henry. The rebellion was defeated by royalist supporters in 1217.

While the castle itself is depicted realistically, the nearby Norman Cathedral and the city of Rochester are completely missing from the location shots. In reality, the cathedral is only a few hundred yards from the castle walls and Rochester has been a substantial settlement since Roman times.

The film's Danes are depicted as Hungarian-speaking Viking-like pagans when Denmark had been Christianized by that time. Also, King John's mercenaries were mostly Flemish, Provençals and Aquitainians, not Danes.

Thomas Marshal, the main character played by James Purefoy, is based loosely upon medieval knight and statesman William Marshal.

The movie has the Knights Templar as among the ringleaders in the battle against John Lackland. In reality, the Templars and King John had a cordial relation and they were one of the few powerful groups in England which John did not offend or alienate during his reign, and the order was amongst his financial backers providing him with the necessary funds to wage war.

== Reception ==
On review aggregator Rotten Tomatoes, the film has an approval rating of 42% based on reviews from 55 critics. The site's critical consensus reads, "Ironclad serves up plenty of crunchy gore to sate action aficionados, but the sketchy story clunks like a suit of ill-fitting armor." On Metacritic, the film holds a weighted average score of 42 out of 100 based on 14 critics, indicating "mixed or average" reviews.

Manohla Dargis, writing from The New York Times criticized the film for its emphasis on violent action scenes above a cohesive plot, stating that “Ironclad” alternately feels, plays and sounds like an abridged television mini-series and a feature-length video game," and that "the action is cluttered and the story overly compressed," but conceded that the film was enthusiastic in its pursuit of violence to entertain.Writing for The Guardian, Alex von Tunzelmann was critical of the film's historical inaccuracies. "The film makes a big deal out of the supposedly deathly rivalry between John and the Templars. There wasn't one."

== Sequel ==
A sequel called, Ironclad: Battle for Blood, was announced as in development shortly after the film's release. It is directed by Jonathan English and set five years after the end of the first film. In late 2013 a trailer was released, and the film was released in March 2014. The sequel went on to receive negative reviews, with a Rotten Tomatoes score of 17% and many critics condemning the film for intensifying the faults from its predecessor. Leslie Felperin from The Hollywood Reporter criticized the film for its decreased budget, less famous ensemble, and "sloppier" retelling of medieval history, but complimented the film on its musical score, stating that "Andreas Weidinger's orchestral score, featuring choral elements and plenty of brass, represents a redeeming feature."

== See also ==
- List of historical drama films
