= Ironclad: Battle for Blood =

- Directed by: Jonathan English
- Screenplay by: Jonathan English; Stephen McDool
- Story by: Jonathan English
- Produced by: Rick Benattar; Jonathan English; Andrew J. Curtis; Jamie Carmichael; Marija Djukelic; Milos Djukelic; Marko Jocic; Nigel Thomas
- Starring: Roxanne McKee; Michelle Fairley; Danny Webb; Tom Austen
- Cinematography: Zoran Popovic
- Edited by: Laurens Van Charante
- Music by: Andreas Weidinger; Stephan Römer
- Production companies: Mythic International Entertainment; International Pictures One; Gloucester Place Films
- Distributed by: Warner Bros. Pictures
- Release date: 14 March 2014 (United Kingdom)
- Running time: 108 minutes
- Countries: United Kingdom; Serbia
- Language: English
- Box office: $191,154

Ironclad: Battle for Blood is a 2014 epic war film directed by Jonathan English. It is the sequel to his 2011 film Ironclad. The film was a critical failure and a box-office flop.

== Plot ==
Five years after the events of Ironclad, the de Vesci family struggles with Scot raiders along the English-Scottish border. A blood feud begins after the Scot chieftain's son is killed in one of these raids. The wounded de Vesci patriarch, Gilbert, sends his son Hubert to seek help from his nephew, a "great warrior" named Guy de Lusignan.

This Guy is revealed to be none other than Baron d'Aubigny's idealistic squire from Ironclad. Unable to find peace after the events at Rochester, he has grown into a cynical, hard-bitten fighting man who makes a living in mercenary work and underground bloodsports. Shrugging off Hubert's appeal to family, he demands payment for his services and those of his partner Berenger, forcing Hubert to hand over the last of the de Vesci fortune. To bolster their numbers, Guy saves a condemned murderer called Crazy Mary with a bribe, but end up getting "two for the price of one" when authorities come after the headsman, Pierrepoint, for selling prisoners.

Hubert leads the four mercenaries back to the besieged de Vesci castle, and they help the garrison beat back the Scot attacks. Guy's reunion with his relations proves awkward. His beautiful, spoiled cousin Blanche spurns him at first, especially after learning that he came for money instead of family, but begins to warm to him after he saves her from Scot infiltrators. Mary seduces Hubert and they start a secret relationship.

Casualties mount as the siege drags on. Gilbert de Vesci dies of his wound, passing his lordship on to Hubert. His wife Joan later takes poison to join him, believing the battle lost. Pierrepoint is murdered by Mary, who held a grudge against her would-be executioner. At last, the Scots resort to fire, burning down the castle gates and storming the keep. Berenger, caught outside, nearly wins a duel with the Scot chieftain before the raiders interrupt and kill him. Hubert entrusts his sisters to Guy before making a last stand with Mary as lord of the castle.

The Scots overpower Hubert and Mary, executing the latter by hanging. To spare Hubert the same fate, Guy recalls his honor and heritage and challenges the Scot chieftain to single combat. He emerges victorious with unexpected help from Blanche. With their leader dead, the clan renounces the blood feud and returns to the hills. An epilogue narrated by Hubert reveals that despite his apparent change of heart at the siege's end, Guy stayed on the mercenary path, and went on to ply his trade in the Hundred Years' War in France.

== Cast ==
- Tom Austen as Guy de Lusignan, a hardened mercenary who fought as a squire at the famous siege of Rochester Castle
- David Rintoul as Gilbert de Vesci, a former Crusader and lord of the de Vesci castle
- Michelle Fairley as Joan de Vesci, Gilbert's wife
- Tom Rhys Harries as Hubert de Vesci, Gilbert's son
- Roxanne McKee as Blanche de Vesci, Gilbert's spoiled older daughter
- Rosie Day as Kate de Vesci, Gilbert's younger daughter
- Danny Webb as Smith, Gilbert's doughty manservant
- David Caves as Berenger, Guy's friend and fellow mercenary who owes him a life debt
- Twinnie-Lee Moore as Crazy Mary, a condemned murderer
- Andy Beckwith as Pierrepoint (Charles Montserrat de Pierrepoint III), an executioner
- Predrag Bjelac as Maddog, chieftain of the Scot raiders

== Reception ==
=== Critical response ===
The film was a critical failure. On the review aggregator website Rotten Tomatoes, 17% of 12 critics' reviews are positive, with an average rating of 3.5/10. Metacritic, which uses a weighted average, assigned the film a score of 22 out of 100, based on 4 critics, indicating "generally unfavorable" reviews.

Guy Lodge of Variety wrote that English "rehashes most of his technical devices from the first film" and noted that the "production and costume design on the Serbian-shot production are economically restrained," though "Andreas Weidinger’s kitschily choral score is anything but."

=== Box office ===
Not released in the United States and Canada, and with limited release in other territories, Ironclad: Battle for Blood grossed $191,154 in worldwide box office.

=== Home video ===
When released in home video, the film made a further $207,835 in combined DVD and Blu-ray sales.
