= Minotaur (2006 film) =

- DVD cover
- Directed by: Jonathan English; James Pass
- Screenplay by: Nick Green; Stephen McDool
- Produced by: Jonathan English; Kimberly Barnes; John Evangelides; Tom Reeve
- Starring: Tom Hardy; Tony Todd; Rutger Hauer; Ingrid Pitt
- Cinematography: Nick Morris
- Edited by: Eddie Hamiltons
- Music by: Martin Todsharow
- Production company: First Look Studios
- Distributed by: Lions Gate
- Release dates: March 11, 2006 (United States); July 26, 2006 (Germany)
- Running time: 93 minutes
- Countries: United Kingdom; Luxembourg; Germany; France; Spain; Italy; United States
- Language: English
- Budget: $7 million
- Box office: $892,786

Minotaur is a 2006 British horror film, directed by Jonathan English. It stars Tom Hardy, Tony Todd, Ingrid Pitt and Rutger Hauer. It was filmed in Luxembourg, and is a loose retelling of the Greek myth of Theseus and the Minotaur.

== Plot ==
In the Minoan Bronze Age, a shadow looms over the village of Thena. Every three years, under King Deucalion's order, eight youths are taken from the village to the capital of the Minoans. There, they are placed in an underground labyrinth to be sacrificed to the Minotaur, a Minoan god.

Theo, son of the village chief Cyrnan, is haunted by the loss of his beloved Ffion in an earlier sacrifice. A leprous prophetess tells him that Ffion still survives in the labyrinth. Against his father's wishes, Theo replaces one of the chosen sacrifices. He is taken captive to the capital with the others: Danu (Theo's best friend), Morna (Danu's love interest), Tyro (who initially resents Theo's high status), Didi (Tyro's love interest), Vena, Ziko, and Nan.

Immediately after the group is dropped into the labyrinth, the Minotaur begins hunting them, first killing Nan. The survivors are approached by Queen Raphaella, Deucalion's sister and unwilling lover, who offers them a way out. Vena does not believe her and attempts to leave the group but is quickly killed by the Minotaur. The rest of the group escapes, and Raphaella leads them to a chamber at the center of the labyrinth, where a heavy wooden door leads out. The monster lies there, sleeping on a pile of its victims' remains.

Raphaella had previously arranged for her handmaiden Ramaya to open the door from the other side, but Deucalion caught the servant and executed her. The desperate group tried to break open the door, but the noise woke the Minotaur. It killed Ziko, and the group scattered.

Theo, Danu, and Morna encounter a villager named Turag from a previous offering. Turag has managed to elude the Minotaur but has become unhinged after years of being trapped with the monster. Theo sees his beloved Ffion's likely location while examining Turag's labyrinth map. Theo goes off alone to find her but instead finds her corpse lying where she was poisoned by an underground gas deposit.

Meanwhile, Tyro and Didi reach the hole in the ceiling through which they were dropped. Tyro climbs up and reaches down to pull up Didi, but the Minotaur arrives, and Didi panics, loses her grip, and falls onto one of its horns. The Minotaur also corners lovers Danu and Morna; Danu sacrifices himself to save Morna.

Raphaella reaches Theo again and explains the Minotaur's origin: Her mother committed bestiality to create a living god and gave birth to the Minotaur. As the monster grew, so did its appetite, culminating in murdering Raphaella and Deucalion's brother. The prince's death was blamed on Theo's village, resulting in them providing human sacrifices to appease the Minotaur, ensuring Minos' survival from the sated monster. Raphaella sent the leper to find someone in the village capable of killing the Minotaur, and thus, the leper lied to Theo about Ffion's survival to move him to confront the Minotaur.

When the Minotaur prepares to kill Theo, Tyro sacrifices himself to distract it. Theo tempts the beast into attacking him, lures it to the gas vent, and makes a spark with Ffion's amulet. The gas ignites, and the flame engulfs that part of the labyrinth; Theo and Raphaella survive by diving into a water pond. They emerge from the water as the flames die out, finding the monster is still alive and even more aggressive. As the Minotaur charges at him, Theo jams one of its horns, which had broken off earlier, into its mouth. Injured but still enraged, the beast charges forward and collides with a rock, which drives the horn through its head, finally killing it.

Theo, Raphaella, and the remaining survivors, Morna and Turag, escape the collapsing labyrinth. On the surface, they discover that the explosion under the palace collapsed it, leaving Deucalion gravely wounded. Raphaella smothers him to death. With the Minotaur's and King Deucalion's deaths, the Minoan empire dissolves, and Theo becomes a legend for killing the monster.

== Cast ==
- Tom Hardy as Theo
- Michelle Van Der Water as Queen Raphaella
- Tony Todd as King Deucalion
- Lex Shrapnel as Tyro
- Jonathan Readwin as Danu
- Rutger Hauer as Cyrnan
- Maimie McCoy as Morna
- Lucy Brown as Didi
- James Bradshaw as Ziko
- Fiona Maclaine as Vena
- Claire Murphy as Nan
- Ingrid Pitt as The Sybil/The Leper
- Ciaran Murtagh as Turag
- Angela Furtado as Ramaya, Raphaella's Handmaiden
- Donata Jaietz as Ffion

== Release ==
Minotaur was released on DVD by Lions Gate on 20 June 2006; Maple Pictures released the film in Canada the same day. It was re-released 14 months later by Brightspark on 3 September 2007.

== Reception ==
Allmovie gave the film a negative review, calling it "highly forgettable". The reviewer, J. Wheeler, wrote that, although it had a strong first act, the film was undone by slow pacing, and an unimpressive or scary monster design. Dread Central reviewer J. Condit rated the film three out of five, writing that "Minotaur is the sort of film that if you paid to see it in a movie theater you'd probably come out not so much disliking the film as feeling a bit underwhelmed by it. But as far as Sci-Fi Channel premieres and direct-to-DVD movies go these days, Minotaur is an above average monster movie that's definitely worth a look – if for no other reason, see ... whatever it is Tony Todd is doing here." Digital Retribution also rated the film three out of five, calling it "fairly mediocre". Popcorn Pictures rated the film at five out of ten, writing "Minotaur is an underwhelming experience. It's totally formulaic but somehow different. You'll feel like you've just watched something like The Relic again, but then the whole mythological spin immediately throws that out of your mind. The jury is still out."

== See also ==
- List of historical drama films
- List of films based on Greco-Roman mythology
