= Rochester Castle =

Well preserved 12th-century castle in Rochester, Kent, South East England

- Rochester, Kent, South East England
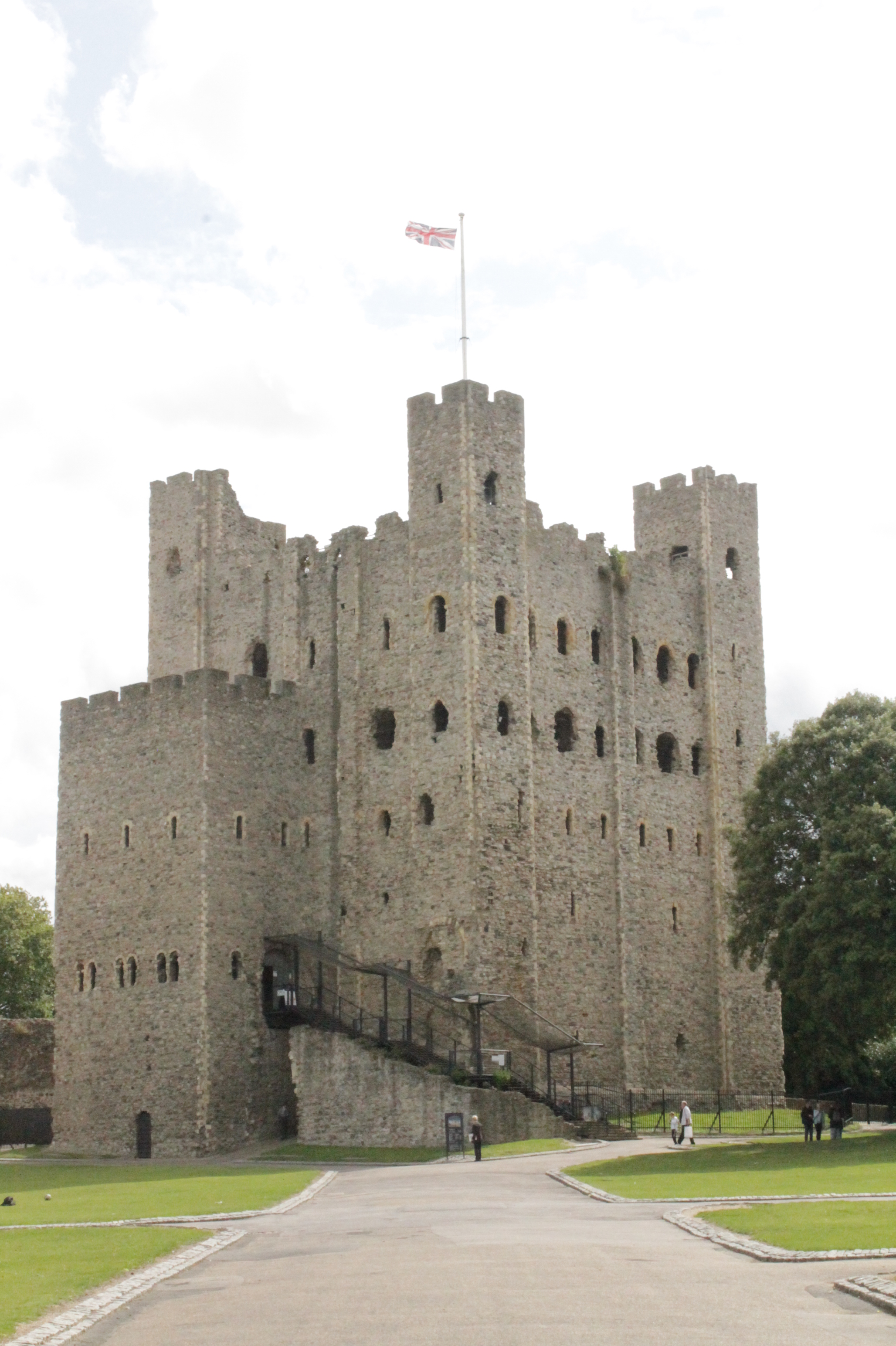
- Rochester Castle - main approach

Site information
- Type: Castle
- Owner: English Heritage managed by Medway Council
- Open to the public: Yes
- Condition: Ruinous

Location
- Location shown within Kent
- Coordinates: 51°23′24″N 0°30′05″E
- Height: 113 feet (34 m) (the Keep)

Site history
- Built: Construction started 1087–1089; Keep built around 1127
- Materials: Kentish Ragstone

Rochester Castle stands on the east bank of the River Medway in Rochester, Kent, South East England. The 12th-century keep or stone tower, which is the castle's most prominent feature, is one of the best preserved of its time in England or France.

Situated on the River Medway and Watling Street, Rochester was a strategically important royal castle. During the late medieval period, it helped protect England's south-east coast from invasion. The first castle at Rochester was founded in the aftermath of the Norman Conquest. It was given to Bishop Odo, probably by his half-brother William the Conqueror. During the Rebellion of 1088 over the succession to the English throne, Odo supported Robert Curthose, the Conqueror's eldest son, against William Rufus. It was during this conflict that the castle first saw military action; the city and castle were besieged after Odo made Rochester a headquarters for the rebellion. After the garrison capitulated, this first castle was abandoned.

Between 1087 and 1089, Rufus asked Gundulf, Bishop of Rochester, to build a new stone castle at Rochester. He established the current extent of the castle. Though much altered through the centuries, some parts of Gundulf's work survive. In 1127 King Henry I granted the castle to the Archbishop of Canterbury in perpetuity. William de Corbeil built the massive keep that still dominates the castle today. Throughout the 12th century the castle remained in the custody of the archbishops.

During the First Barons' War (1215–1217) in King John's reign, baronial forces captured the castle from Archbishop Stephen Langton and held it against the king, who then besieged it. The Barnwell chronicler remarked "Our age has not known a siege so hard pressed nor so strongly resisted". After resisting for just over seven weeks, the garrison surrendered. The castle had been greatly damaged, with breaches in the outer walls and one corner of the keep collapsed, and hunger eventually forced the defenders' hand. The castle did not stay under John's control for long: in 1216 it was captured by the French Prince Louis, who was the new leader of the baronial faction. John died and was succeeded by his son King Henry III in 1216; the next year, the war ended and the castle was taken under direct royal control.

Rochester was besieged for the third time in 1264 during the Second Barons' War (1264–1267). The castle's royal constable, Roger de Leybourne, held Rochester in support of Henry III. Rebel armies led by Simon de Montfort and Gilbert de Clare entered the city and set about trying to capture the castle. Again the castle's defenders resisted, this time with a different outcome. After a week, the rebel armies raised the siege in the face of relief from Henry himself. The garrison did not surrender, and the castle suffered extensive damage that was not repaired until the following century. The castle saw military action for the last time in 1381 when it was captured and ransacked during the Peasants' Revolt. As Rochester Castle fell out of use its materials were reused elsewhere and custodianship was relinquished by the Crown. The castle and its grounds were opened to the public in the 1870s as a park. At various points during the 19th and 20th centuries repairs were carried out. The castle is protected as a Grade I listed building and Scheduled Monument. Today the ruins are in the guardianship of English Heritage and open to the public.

== Early history ==
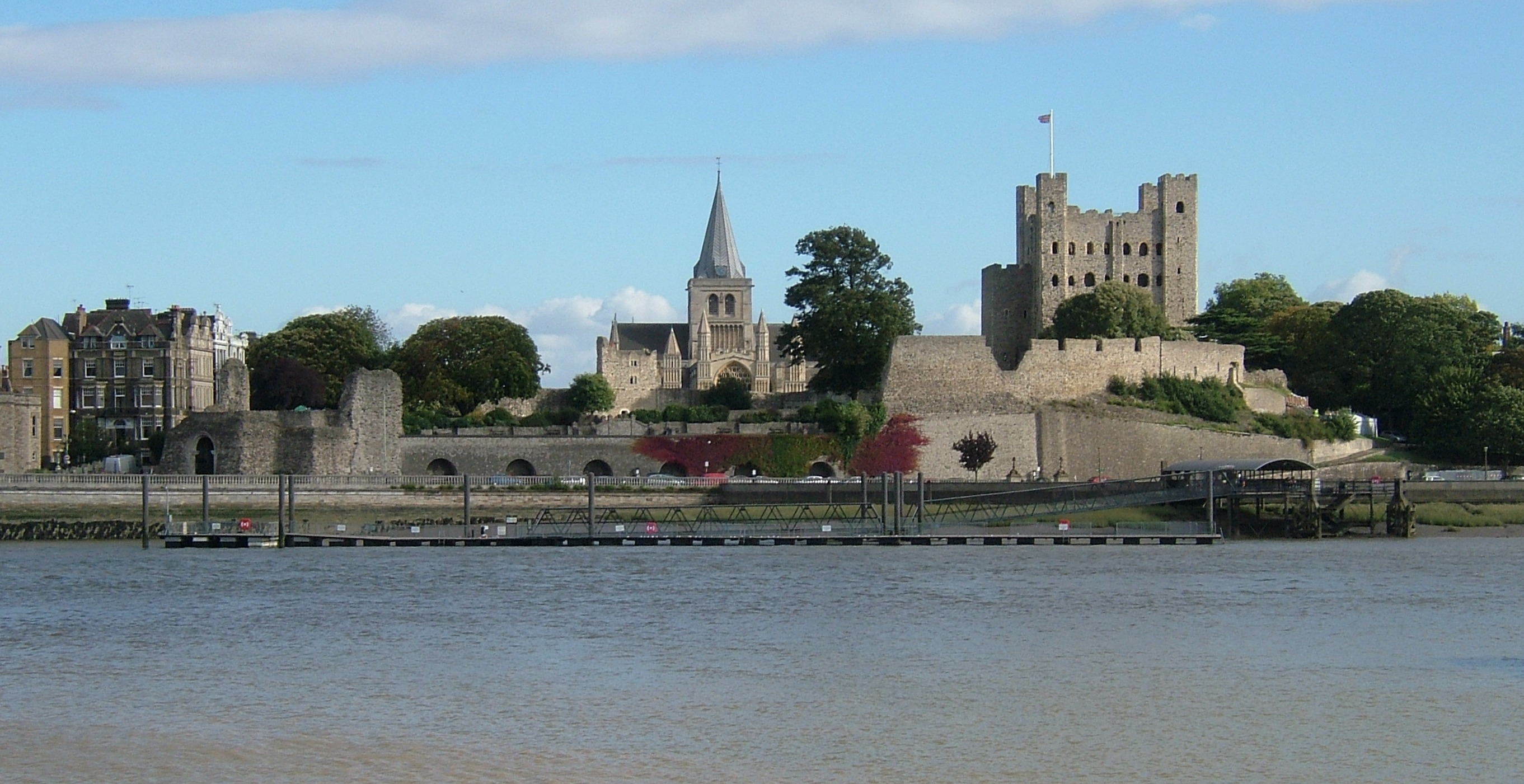
Rochester Cathedral (centre) is visible adjoining the castle's ruined fortifications.

Castles were introduced to England by the Normans in the 11th century and their construction, in the wake of the conquest of 1066, helped the Normans secure their new territory. Rochester was an important city, built on the site of a Roman town at the junction of the River Medway and Watling Street, a Roman road. It has long been assumed that the first castle was located next to the river, just outside the south-west corner of the town walls. The conjectural site of the early castle later became known as "Boley Hill". Archaeologist Tom McNeill has suggested that these earliest castles in England may have been purely military, built to contain a large number of troops in hostile territory.

According to the Domesday Book of 1086, the Bishop of Rochester was given land valued at 17s 4d in Aylesford, Kent, in compensation for land that became the site of Rochester Castle. Of the 48 castles mentioned in the survey, Rochester is the only one for which property owners were reimbursed when their land was taken to build the castle. From the 11th century the castle-guard was a feudal obligation in England. This often took the form of knights garrisoning castles for their lords for a set period. There is no comprehensive list of which castles were owed service in this form, but military historian Cathcart King notes that they seem to have been predominantly high-status castles. Rochester's castle-guard consisted of 60 knights' fees, marking it as a particularly important fortification.

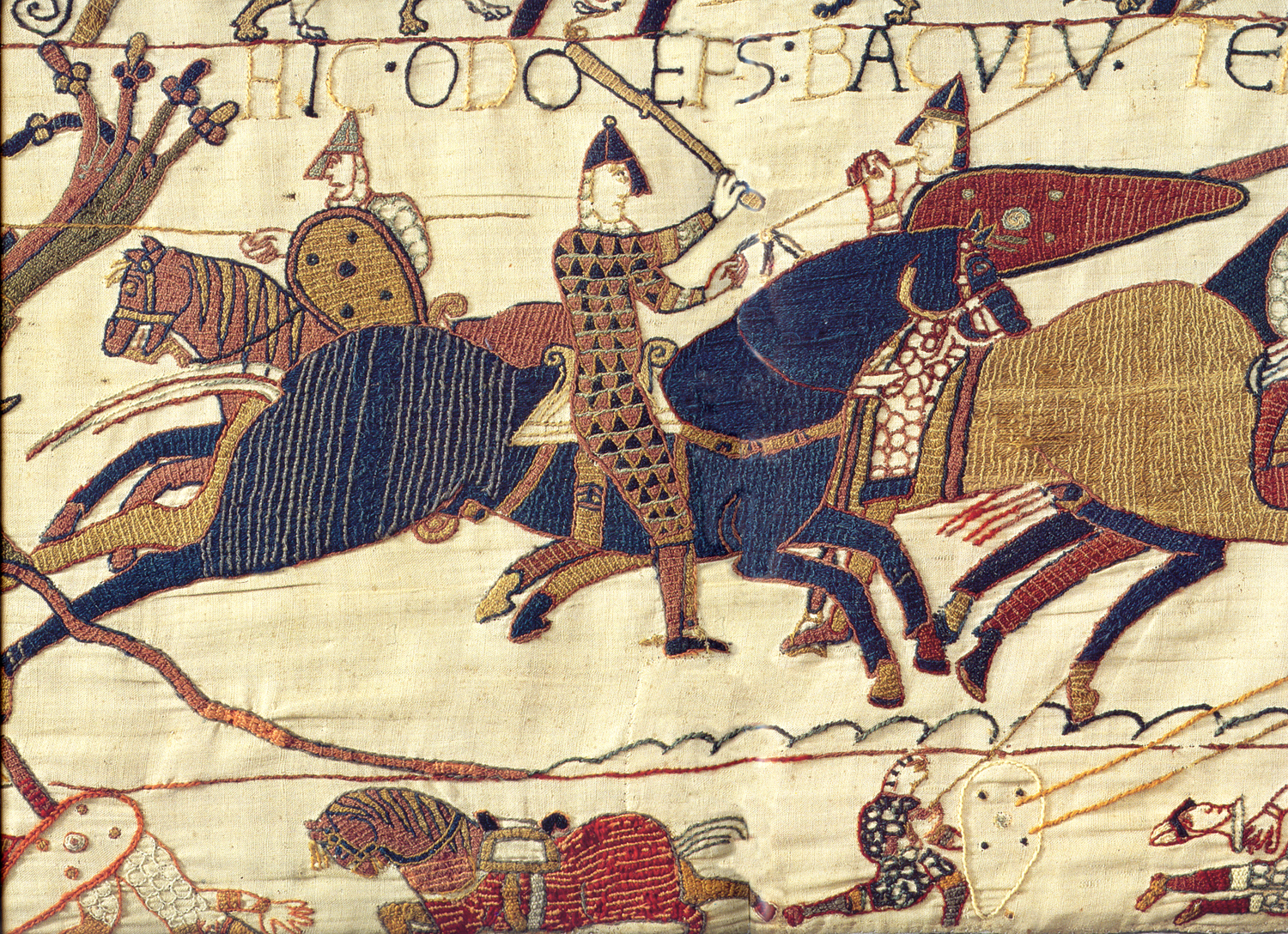
Bishop Odo, here wielding a bishop's club in the Bayeux Tapestry, held Rochester as one of the headquarters of a revolt against King William Rufus in 1088.

It was probably William the Conqueror who gave the city and its castle to Bishop Odo of Bayeux, the king's half-brother. On William's death in September 1087, his territories were divided between his two sons. Robert, the elder, inherited the title of Duke of Normandy and William Rufus became King of England. A significant number of Norman barons objected to dividing Normandy and England, and Bishop Odo supported Robert's claim to the English throne. Several others, including the earls of Northumberland and Shrewsbury and the Bishop of Coutances, came out in support of Robert. Odo prepared Rochester Castle for war and it became one of the headquarters of the rebellion. Its position in Kent made it a suitable base for raids on London and its garrison could harry William's forces in the county. William set off from London and marched towards Rochester to deal with the threat. Before he arrived, news reached the king that Odo had gone to Pevensey Castle, which was under the control of Robert, Count of Mortain. William turned away from Rochester and seized Pevensey. The captured Odo was forced to swear to hand over Rochester to William's men. The king despatched a force with Odo in tow to demand Rochester's surrender. Instead of yielding, the garrison sallied and captured the entire party. In response, William laid siege to the city and castle. Contemporary chronicler Orderic Vitalis recorded that the siege began in May 1088. Two siege-castles were built to cut off the city's supply lines and to protect the besiegers from sorties. Conditions within the city were dire: disease was rampant, exacerbated by the heat and flies. The garrison ultimately capitulated and terms were agreed. Odo, Eustace, Count of Boulogne, and Robert of Bellême, son of the Earl of Shrewsbury, were allowed to march away with their weapons and horses but their estates in England were confiscated. This marked the end of the castle's role in the rebellion, and the fortification was probably abandoned shortly afterward. The siege castles were abandoned after the conclusion of the siege and have since vanished.

After the abandonment of Rochester's first castle, it was replaced by another on the current site, in the south-west corner of the town walls. Founded between 1087 and 1089, some parts of the castle survive, much altered by use and reuse in subsequent centuries. William the Conqueror had granted Lanfranc, Archbishop of Canterbury, the manor of Haddenham in Buckinghamshire – which as of the Domesday Survey had an annual income of £40 – for the duration of his life. In turn, the archbishop had granted the manor to Rochester's monks, so on the Conqueror's death Lanfranc and Gundulf, who was appointed Bishop of Rochester in 1077, had to appeal for reconfirmation of the original grant from the new king. William Rufus demanded £100 in exchange for confirmation of the grant. The two bishops felt such a sum was beyond their means and sought a compromise. Instead, it was agreed that Gundulf would build a new stone castle at Rochester. Initially, the two bishops were concerned that the cost would exceed the king's original request and that they would be responsible for the castle's upkeep. Henry, Earl of Warwick convinced them that a castle suitable for the king could be constructed for £40 and that following its completion the castle would be handed over to someone else. The actual cost to Gundulf was £60. The bishop was a skilled architect and supervised the construction of the Tower of London's eponymous White Tower on behalf of William the Conqueror. Gundulf's castle was adjacent to Rochester Cathedral. According to archaeologist Oliver Creighton, when castles were positioned close to churches or cathedrals it suggested a link between the two, and in this case, both were owned by the Bishop of Rochester. Often the same craftsmen and architects would work on these closely related buildings, leading to similarities in some of their features. Along with Durham and Old Sarum, Rochester is one of the best examples of a closely linked castle and religious building.

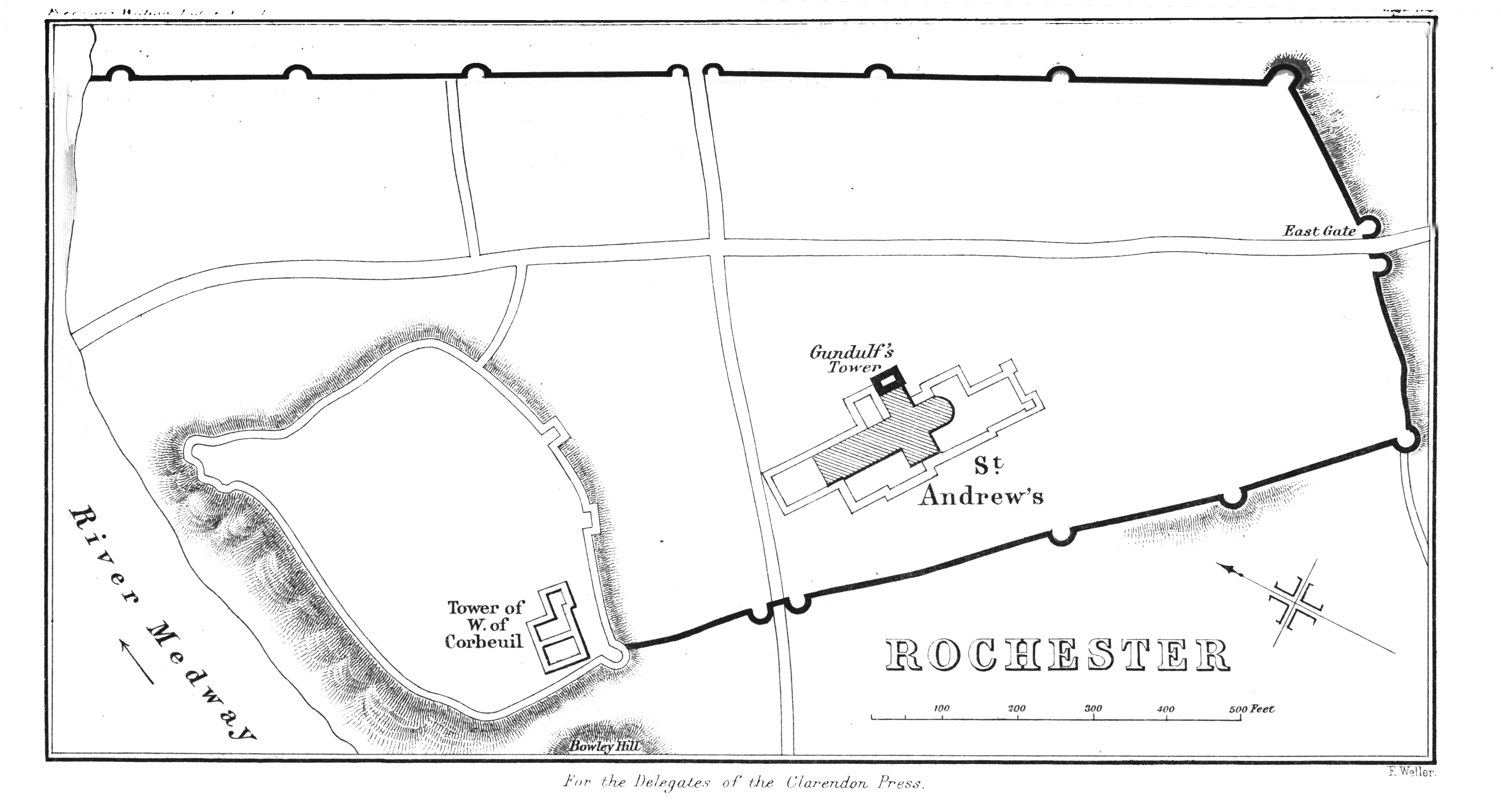
This 19th-century reconstruction of medieval Rochester from E. A. Freeman's The Reign of William Rufus 1882 shows the city was surrounded by a wall. The castle founded by Gundulf was in the south-west corner. Construction started around 1127; it shows the great tower built by William de Corbeil.

In 1127 King Henry I granted Rochester Castle to the Archbishop of Canterbury, William de Corbeil, and his successors in perpetuity. He was given permission to build "a fortification or tower within the castle and keep and hold it forever". Corbeil is responsible for building the great tower or keep that still stands today, albeit in an altered state. The 12th century saw many castles in England rebuilt in stone, an advancement in sophistication of design and technology. Rochester had already been given a stone curtain wall by Bishop Gundulf, and the keep dates from this period. It visually dominated the rest of the castle, towering above its outer walls, and acted as a residence containing the castle's best accommodation. A sturdy fortification, it could also serve as a stronghold in the event of military action. Such was the importance of the keep as a symbol of Rochester it was depicted on the town's seal in the 13th century.

Construction progressed at a rate of about 10 feet (3.0 m) per year. It was probably finished before Corbeil died in 1138 and definitely before 1141, when Robert, Earl of Gloucester, was imprisoned there during the Anarchy of King Stephen's reign. It is likely that after the keep was built there was no further building activity in the 12th century, only maintenance. The castle was held by the Archbishops of Canterbury under the king, but the monarch was still responsible for financially supporting it. Continuous records of royal expenditures known as "Pipe Rolls" began in the reign of Henry II, and included in the rolls are details of expenditure on Rochester Castle's upkeep. During the 12th century, these were generally small figures, but in 1172–1173 more than £100 was spent on the castle, coinciding with the rebellion of Henry II's sons. Following the fall of Normandy in 1204 to the French forces of King Philip II, King John increased his expenditure on the castles in south-east England in preparation for a possible invasion. Amongst these was Rochester and in 1206 John spent £115 on the castle's ditches, keep, and other structures. Under England's Angevin kings royal castles in south-east England were invested in to protect the country from invasion; Rochester was one of the most important.

== King John ==
Custody of Rochester Castle remained with the Archbishops of Canterbury until the end of the 12th century. Despite ascending to the throne in 1199 King John did not confirm Hubert Walter as the castle's custodian until July 1202. John may have wished to regain direct control of what was an important castle. The crisis of John's rule began in 1212 with the discovery of a plot to overthrow him. Defeat at the Battle of Bouvines in July 1214 marked the end of John's ambitions to retake Normandy and exacerbated the situation in England. He returned to England in October and a few months later barons in the north of England rose against him. A group of barons renounced their feudal ties to John in May 1215 and captured London, Lincoln, and Exeter. John persuaded Stephen Langton, the new Archbishop of Canterbury, to give control of Rochester Castle to a royal constable, Reginald de Cornhill. Under the terms of the agreement, the castle was to revert to the control of the archbishop at Easter 1215. This period was later extended to Easter 1216. Letters Patent dated 25 May 1215 requested that other royal constables would take over from Cornhill. The castle would still be returned to the archbishop when the agreement expired or if peace was restored to the kingdom before Easter 1216. In the meantime, control reverted to Langton whom John had asked to hold the castle "in such a way that by it no ill or harm shall come to us or our kingdom".

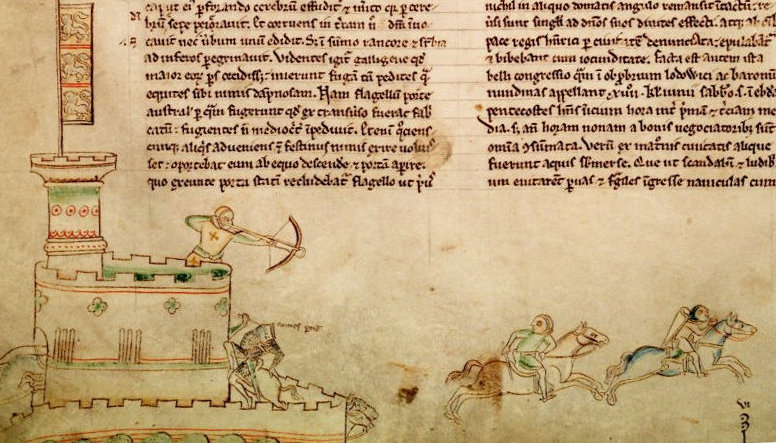
An early 13th-century drawing by Matthew Paris showing contemporary warfare, including the use of castles, crossbowmen and mounted knights

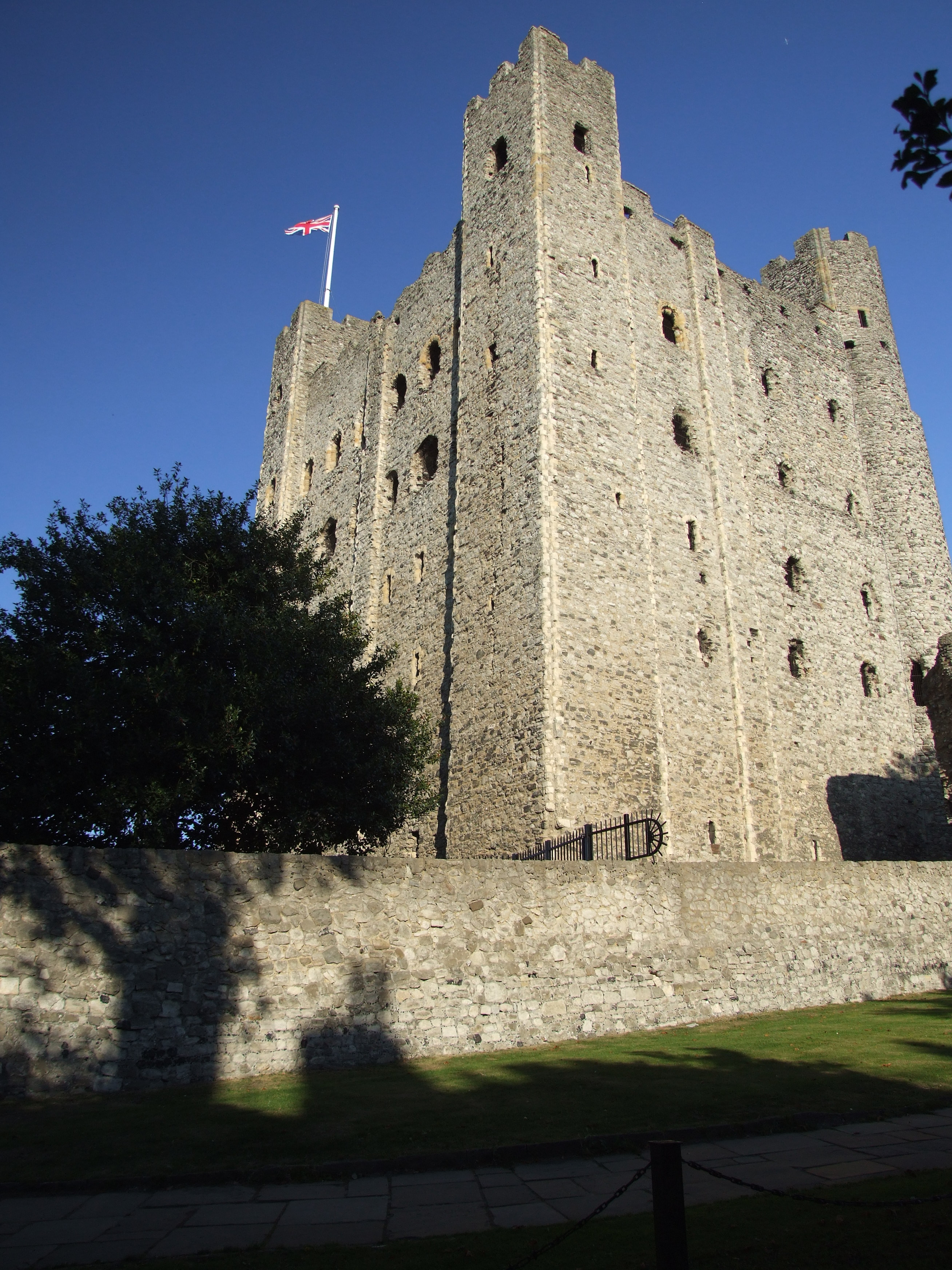
Chroniclers record that in 1215 the rebels garrisoned Rochester Castle with between 95 and 140 knights, supported by bowmen and sergeants, amongst others.

John met the rebel barons at Runnymede, and on 19 June 1215 they renewed their vows of fealty. A peace treaty, which later became known as Magna Carta, was sealed. Shortly after the treaty the agreement between John and Langton to appoint a royal constable in charge of Rochester Castle was dissolved, returning control to the archbishop. The peace did not last and the First Barons' War broke out. A group of rebels headed to Rochester to hold the city against John. The events of the rebel takeover of the castle are unclear but the contemporary chronicler Ralph of Coggeshall recorded that the king demanded Langton hand over the castle to royal control and the archbishop refused. Langton held out against the king's demands but the rebels feared he would eventually succumb to pressure from the king and seized control of the castle. According to Ralph of Coggeshall, this was done with the consent of the castle's constable, Reginald de Cornhill, who seems to have switched allegiance from the king to the archbishop after John appointed him as royal constable of the castle. Langton left the country that same month, leaving the castle in the hands of the king's enemies. In a letter that year to justiciar Hubert de Burgh John expressed his frustration towards Langton, calling him "a notorious traitor to us, since he did not render our castle of Rochester to us in our so great need". After this point, Rochester Castle was no longer considered to be in the perpetual custody of the archbishops of Canterbury.

At the time, John was in south-east England recruiting mercenaries in preparation for his war with the barons. Rochester blocked the direct route to London, which was also held by the rebels. According to Roger of Wendover, the rebels at Rochester were led by William d'Aubigny, lord of Belvoir. Estimates of the size of Rochester's garrison vary, with the chroniclers' figures ranging from 95 to 140 knights, supported by crossbowmen, sergeants and others. Hearing the news that the city was in enemy hands, John immediately rode to Rochester and arrived on 13 October. Royal forces had arrived ahead of John and entered the city on 11 October, taking it by surprise and laying siege to the castle. Rochester bridge was pulled down to prevent the arrival of a relief force from London. The siege that followed was the largest in England up to that point and took nearly two months.

Boley Hill to the south of the castle may have been used as John's headquarters during the siege. According to the Barnwell chronicler, five siege engines hurled a barrage of stones at the castle's wall day and night. These were supported by missiles from smaller bows and crossbows. The Barnwell chronicler claimed they smashed a hole in the castle's outer walls; Roger of Wendover asserted they were ineffective and that John turned to other methods to breach the defences. A letter dated 14 October indicates John was preparing to undermine the castle's walls. He wrote to Canterbury, asking for the production "by day and night of as many picks as you are able" and that they be sent to Rochester. On 26 October a relief force of 700 horse was sent from London. They turned back before arriving, perhaps because they heard the king was advancing to meet them.

When the castle's outer walls were breached, the defenders retreated to the relative safety of the keep. It too withstood the efforts of the siege engines and once again John turned to mining to bring down the walls. The mine was dug beneath the south-east corner of the keep. A letter sent from Rochester on 25 November offers insight into the methods of medieval siege craft. John ordered Hugh de Burgh to "send to us with all speed by day and night forty of the fattest pigs of the sort least good for eating to bring fire beneath the tower". The wooden props supporting the tunnel dug beneath the keep were set alight to collapse the mine, bringing down one corner of the keep. Still the garrison held out and sought safety behind the stone partition or cross-wall in the keep, abandoning half the building. The Barnwell chronicler remarked that "for such was the structure of the stronghold that a very strong wall separated the half that had fallen from the other".

Conditions within the keep worsened by the day and the garrison were reduced to eating horse flesh. To reduce the demand on limited provisions, some members were sent out of the keep, beginning with those least capable of fighting. Some sources record that they had their hands and feet amputated by the besiegers. On 30 November the garrison eventually surrendered and were taken captive. Initially John wanted to execute them all as was the custom of the time when a garrison had forced a long and bloody conflict. Savaric de Mauléon, one of John's captains, persuaded the king otherwise, concerned that similar treatment would be shown to royal garrisons by the rebels. Only one person was executed: a crossbowman who had previously been in the service of the king since childhood was hanged. Many of the rebels were imprisoned, sent to royal castles such as Corfe for safe-keeping. Of the siege the Barnwell chronicler wrote, "Our age has not known a siege so hard pressed nor so strongly resisted ... Afterwards few cared to put their trust in castles". Prince Louis of France, son of Philip II, was invited by the barons to become the new leader of the rebellion and become king in the event of their victory. In 1216 he arrived in England and captured Rochester Castle; it is not known how, as no documentary evidence recording the event survives.

== Henry III ==
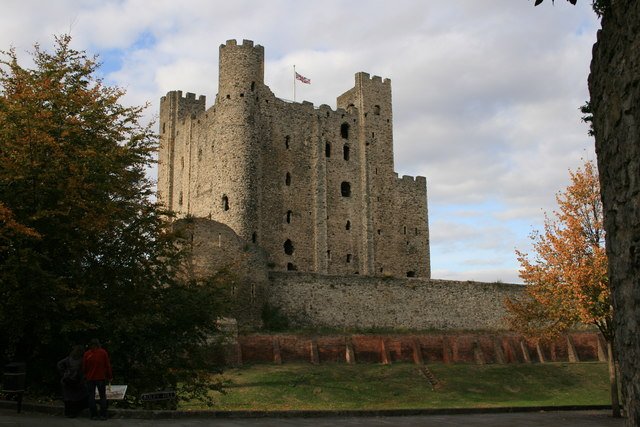
The Round Tower (centre) was a replacement built by Henry III to repair the damage done to the keep by King John's mine. In contrast to the other two towers visible, it is cylindrical.

John died in 1216 and was succeeded by his nine-year-old son, Henry, with the support of the barons. With no prospect of becoming King of England, Louis returned to France. Rochester Castle was returned to royal control in 1217. Given the damage incurred during John's siege, the castle was in dire need of repairs. Between 1217 and 1237 around £680 were spent on repairs, of which £530 were taken up by work on the keep. In 1225 and 1226 the town walls were enhanced by the addition of a ditch at the cost of £300. The new ditch enclosed Boley Hill, possibly to deny the position to future aggressors who might attack the castle. Repairs began with the castle's outer curtain wall. At the same time a chapel was built within the castle. In 1226 the hall, buttery, and dispensary were repaired. Work probably did not begin on the keep until 1226. It was mostly repaired by 1227, but work continued on it until 1232. During 1230 and 1231 a stone wall dividing the castle's enclosure into two parts was built which no longer survives. While attention was paid to making the castle a working fortification, Henry III also funded construction of residential and other buildings. In 1244, £132 was spent on building a second chapel next to the royal apartments. Stables and an almonry were added in 1248. The main gatehouse was rebuilt between 1249 and 1250 at a cost of over £120. Further repairs were carried out on the keep in 1256, this time costing more than £120. Later in the decade further attention was paid to the castle's defences, possibly in response to Henry III's worsening relations with his barons.

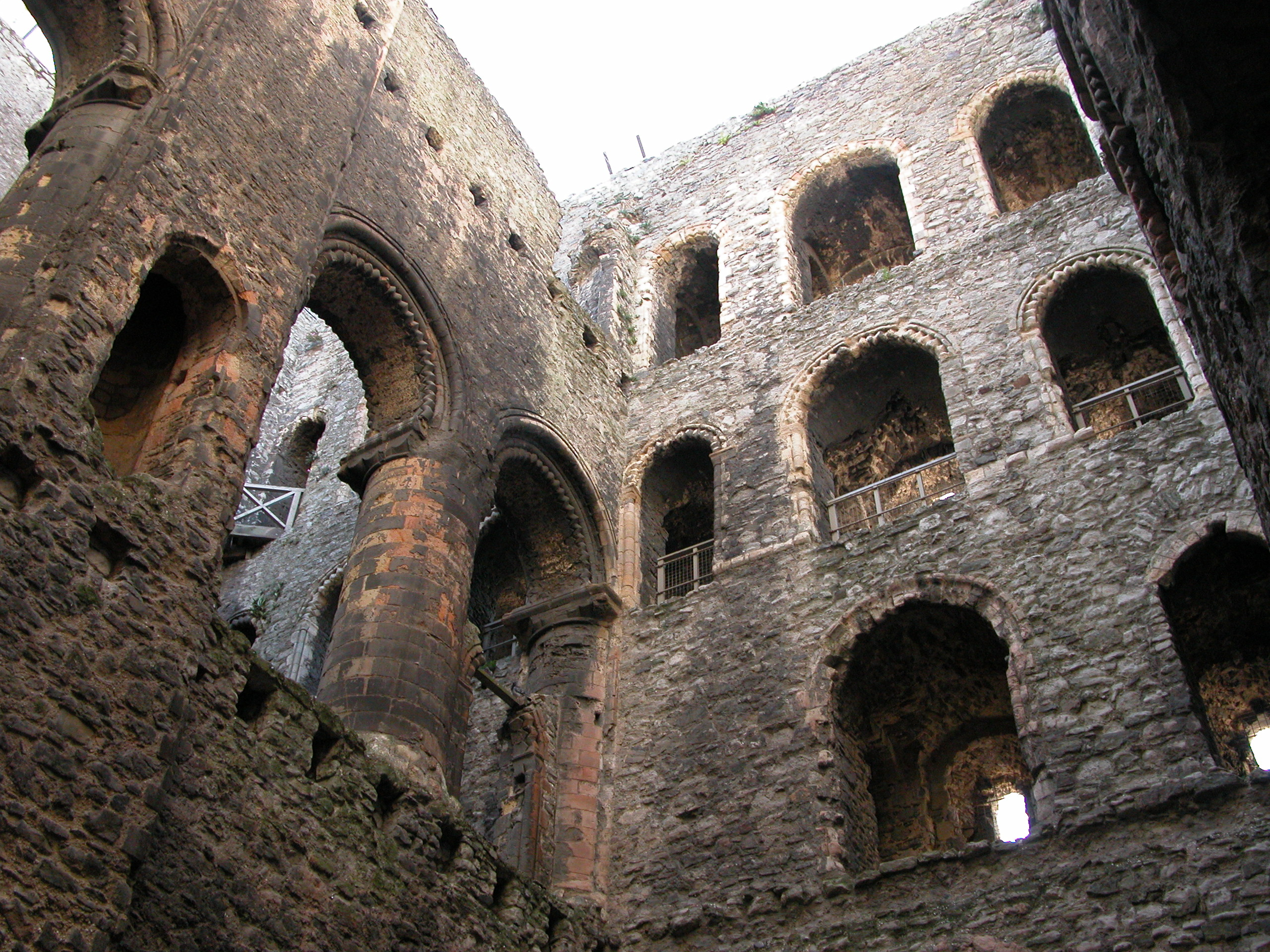
During the 1264 siege the garrison retreated within the keep.

Henry III's reign was in crisis in 1258. He had recently suffered defeat in Wales, there were agricultural problems leading to a famine, and relations with the pope were worsening. Discontent amongst England's magnates led Henry to promise reform, but under continued pressure his authority disintegrated. A royal council of fifteen magnates was formed in June that year, and the rule of the country transferred from the king to the council. With foreign help Henry's reign was restored in 1261 as the council were reluctant to start a civil war. Simon de Montfort, Earl of Leicester, raised a rebellion. In 1264 civil war broke out between those loyal to the king and the baronial forces led by de Montfort.

Rochester's constable in 1264, Roger de Leybourne, held the castle in support of Henry. John de Warenne, Earl of Surrey, was the garrison's co-commander. A baronial army led by Gilbert de Clare, Earl of Hertford, laid siege to the castle on 17 April that year. Having marched from the earl's castle to Tonbridge the army attacked from the Rochester side of the river, either the south or west. While the army advanced towards the city the royalist garrison set alight the suburbs. The king's hall within the castle was also burned down. An army under Simon de Montfort marched from London with the intention of attacking the city from another direction. The earl's first two attempts to cross the Medway were fought back, but he was successful on 18 April, Good Friday using a fire-ship. The smoke may have been used as cover for the rebels, or the ship may have been used to burn the bridge while the army travelled by water. In a co-ordinated attack that had been pre-arranged, the armies of de Montfort and de Clare attacked the city. They entered Rochester in the evening and that night the cathedral was raided. The following day the rebels captured the castle's outer enclosure and the royal garrison retreated to the keep. Because the next day was Easter Sunday there was no fighting; hostilities resumed on the Monday. Siege engines were set up and targeted the keep. As in 1215 the keep proved resistant to missiles, and after a week had not succumbed. According to one contemporary source, the besiegers were about to dig a mine beneath the tower, but the siege was abandoned on 26 April when the earls received news of a relief force led by Henry III and his son, Prince Edward.

== Later history ==
Elizabeth de Burgh Queen of Scots, captured by English in 1306, was confined in the castle in 1314 from March to June.

Though the garrison had held out within the keep, the rest of the castle had incurred severe damage, but no attempt was made to carry out repairs until the reign of Edward III (1327–1377). It was noted in 1275 that the castle's constables had not only failed to make any effort to repair the structure but had caused further damage: they stole stone from the castle for reuse elsewhere. In 1281 John of Cobham, the constable, was granted permission to pull down the castle's hall and chambers which had been left as burnt-out ruins after the 1264 siege. Numerous surveys in the following century bear testament to the castle's sorry state and follow its steady decline. A survey from 1340 estimated that repairs would cost around £600; another conducted 23 years later stated that it would cost £3,333 6s 8d. Natural weathering worsened the condition of the castle, and in 1362 a "great wind" damaged the structure. By 1369 few of the castle's buildings still stood: the keep, gatehouses, a hall, kitchen, and stable were all that survived, and even then in a state of ruin. The keep was in desperate need of repair, but it was still in use and was the centre of the domestic life at the castle.

Between May 1367 and September 1370 repairs costing £2,262 were carried out. Records show that sections of the curtain wall were repaired and two mural towers built, one of them replacing a tower on the same site. The towers were positioned north-east of the keep and still stand. More work was undertaken between 1370 and 1377, the year of Edward's death. The royal apartments built during Henry III's reign were never repaired; it has been suggested this was because by the 14th century, when considerable sums were being spent on repairs elsewhere in the castle, Rochester had fallen out of favour as a royal residence. As the castle's importance as a high-status residence waned, its role as a barracks and administrative centre came to the fore. The reign of Richard II (1377–1400) saw the investment of £500 in repairing the castle. This was in part in response to French raids on England's southern coast during the Hundred Years' War as England's fortunes in the conflict worsened. The most significant of these works was the construction of a tower at the north end of the castle, overlooking the bridge over the Medway. Records document the sum of £350 spent on a new tower between 1378 and 1383, and it mostly likely refers to the one guarding the bridge. Rochester Castle saw fighting for the final time during the Peasants' Revolt of 1381. It was besieged and captured by a group of rebels who plundered the castle and released a prisoner. It has been suggested that the £66 10s spent in 1384–1388 and the £91 13s spent in 1395–1397 may have been partially in response to damage incurred during the revolt.

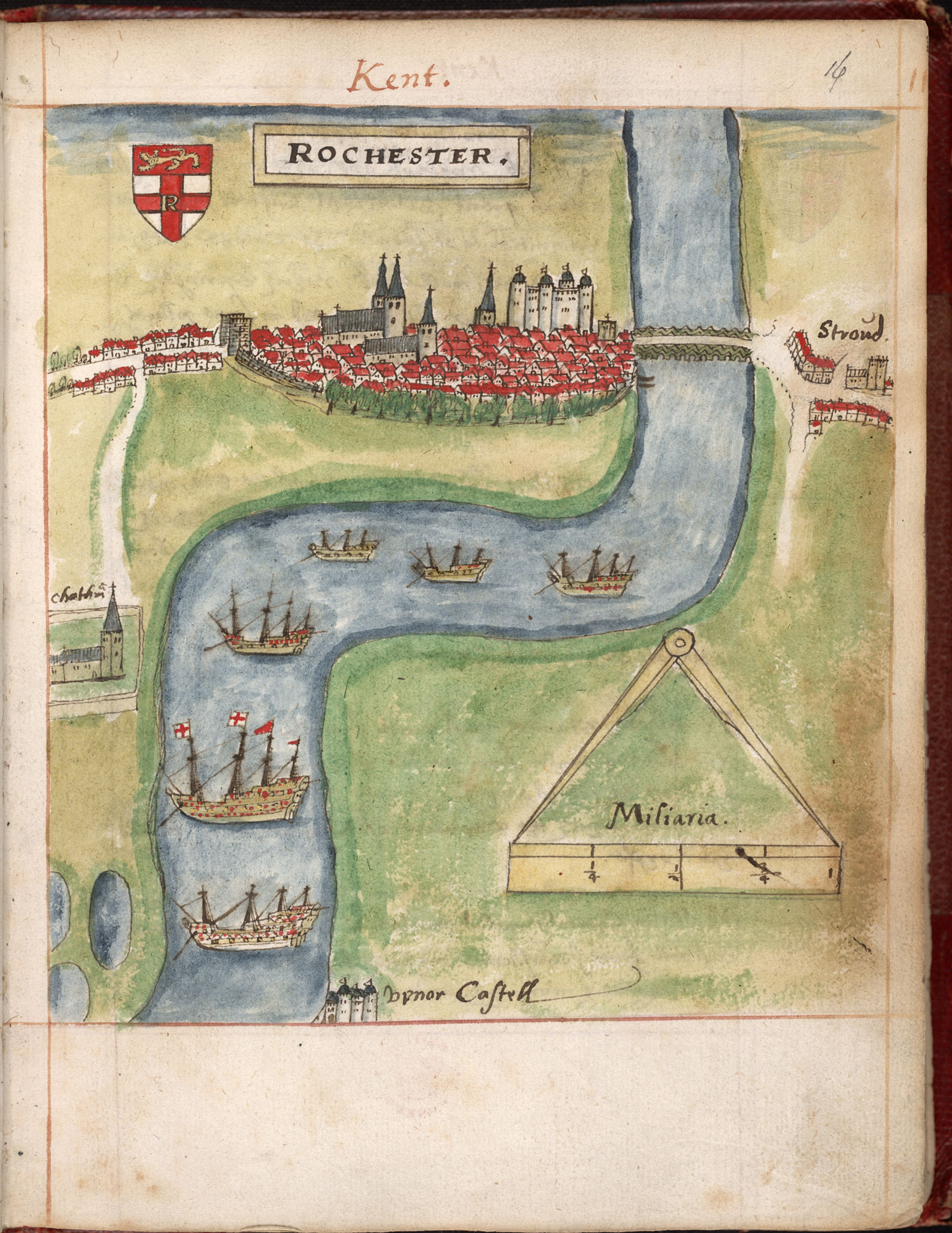
A map of Rochester by William Smith (1588), with the castle and cathedral towering over the town. Sloane MS 2596, f.16.

During the reigns of Henry IV (1399–1413) and his successor Henry V (1413–1422), Rochester Castle was in the guardianship of William, Earl of Arundel and his brother Richard. The castle was given to Henry V's widow, Catherine of Valois, in 1423 as part of her dower to support her financially. She died in 1437, at which point the castle came under the custodianship of the clerk of the King's works. Despite this, there are no records of building work during the 15th century and almost nothing is known about Rochester Castle between then and the second half of the 16th century. On New Year's Day 1540, Henry VIII (1509–1547) made a visit to the castle in disguise to surprise his betrothed Anne of Cleves, who was resting there on her way to Greenwich to meet him. Anne did not recognize the king and spurned his advances, causing him much embarrassment and contributing to the annulment of their marriage just six months later. The decline of the castle's military significance is marked by the leasing of the surrounding ditch, beginning in 1564 at the latest. Between 1599 and 1601 stone from Rochester Castle was reused to build nearby Upnor Castle, an artillery fort.

In 1610 James I granted Sir Anthony Weldon control of the castle. Anne of Denmark and her daughter Princess Elizabeth came to the castle and had dinner on 14 April 1613 before Elizabeth sailed from Margate on her journey to Heidelberg. Diarist Samuel Pepys commented on the condition of Rochester Castle, and as early as the 17th century the castle may have acted as a tourist attraction. By this time many castles were in a state of ruin, and Rochester was amongst those in need of repair, although still in use. During the English Civil War, Anthony Weldon declared for the Parliamentarian cause. The castle did not see fighting during the war, even when the city was captured by Royalists in 1648; this may indicate that the castle was not a serviceable fortification by this point. Weldon's support for the Parliamentarians may have spared the castle from slighting (demolition) in the aftermath, a fate suffered by many other castles. Walker Weldon inherited the castle and carried out the destruction of part of the outer wall in the 18th century to sell off the building material; he had originally intended to dismantle more of the castle, but the plans were abandoned. A drawing from around this time suggests that the cross wall had been removed by this point. While other parts of the castle were dismantled, the two towers in the south-east wall were still being used for accommodation. In 1743 prisoners were held at the castle, probably in huts. Rochester Castle descended through the Weldon family until it was bequeathed to Thomas Blechynden in the 18th century. By 1774 Robert Child was in possession of the castle, and it remained in the possession of his family until 1884. There were unsuccessful plans in 1780 to reuse Rochester Castle as an army barracks, after the commander of the Royal Engineers for Chatham, Colonel Hugh Debbieg, asked the Child family for permission. The castle ruins inspired a painting by artist J. M. W. Turner in the late 18th century, one of his first oil paintings. Turner was renowned for his love of nature and was at the forefront of the picturesque movement, during which such ruins became fashionable.

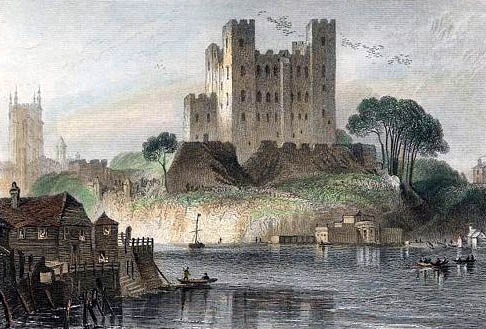
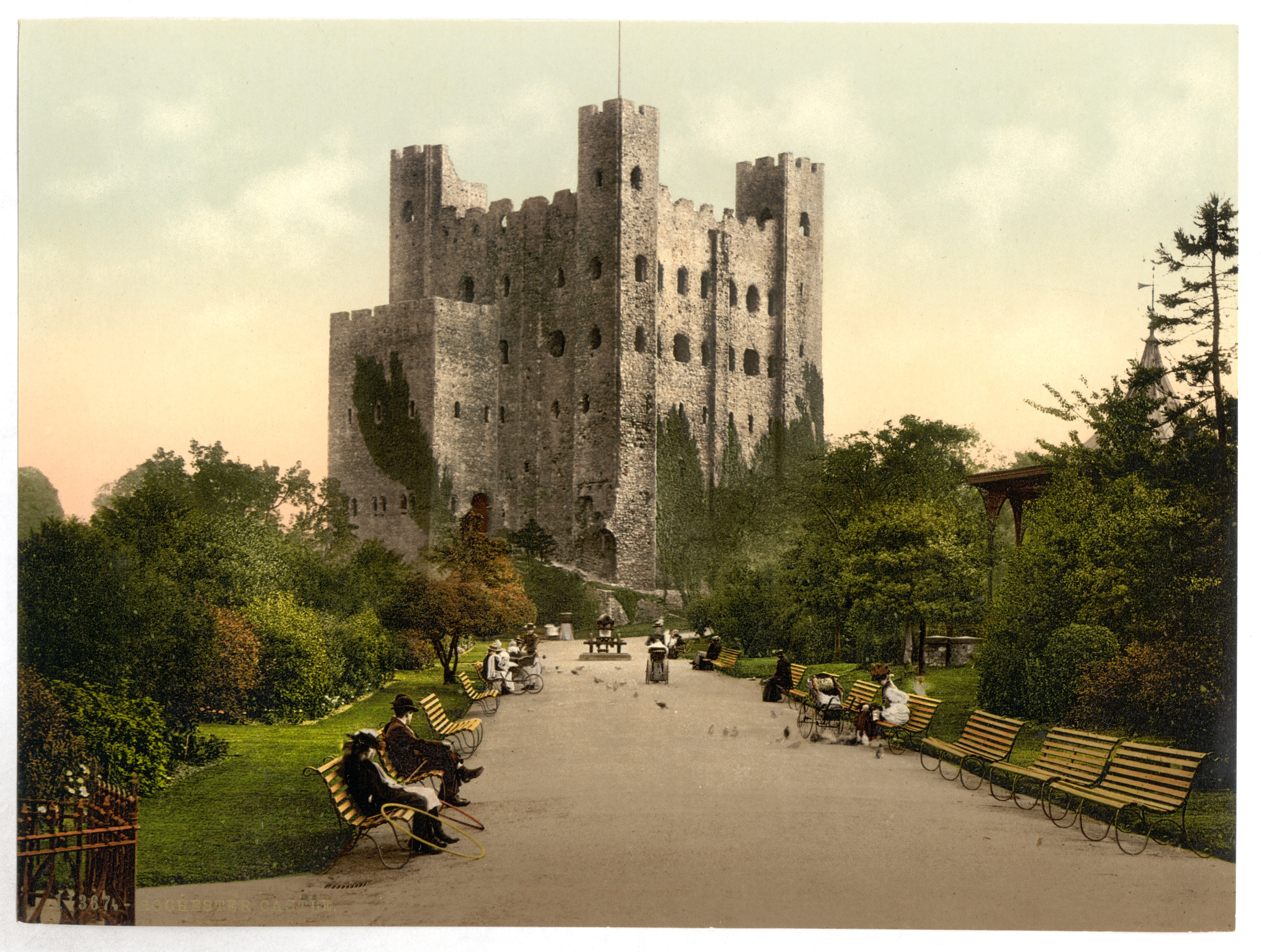
An engraving of Rochester Castle from across the Medway in 1836 by G. F. Sargent (top) and a photochrom of the Castle being used as a public park in the 1890s (bottom).

By the 19th century, gardens were created within the castle's enclosure. Charles Dickens lived in Rochester and included the castle ruins in The Pickwick Papers and The Mystery of Edwin Drood. Through the words of one of his characters, Dickens described the castle as a "glorious pile – frowning wall – tottering arches – dark nooks – crumbling stones". Many of England's historic buildings, particularly ruins, have acquired myths and legends, and some are rumoured to be haunted. Rochester is no exception, and is reportedly haunted by a white lady. Dickens is also said to haunt the moat on Christmas Eve.

The 19th century saw efforts to preserve the castle. In 1826 repairs were made to the well in the keep. At the same time a survey was carried out by A. W. N. Pugin and he excavated around the keep, investigating how it was built. He descended into the well in a bucket in an unsuccessful search for treasure. Victor Child Villiers, 7th Earl of Jersey, leased the castle to the Corporation of Rochester in 1870 for use as a public park; when it opened to the public in 1872, Rochester Castle was presented as a picturesque ruin, with trees planted in the enclosure and the walls overgrown with ivy. In 1884 the Corporation bought the castle for £6,572 (equivalent to £3.4 million in 2009 terms). Between 1896 and 1904, George Payne carried out repairs. In the first quarter of the century the gardens acquired a German field gun, a tank from the First World War, and a bandstand; these were removed by 1961. Ivy was removed from the keep between 1919 and 1931 and the planting in the castles scaled back. In 1960 the origin of Boley Hill was investigated archaeologically, but the excavations failed to provide firm dating evidence.

The castle's state was assessed in 1961, and the cost of repairs estimated at £30,000 (equivalent to £1.1 million in 2009 terms). The Ministry of Public Building and Works took over care of the castle from the Corporation of Rochester in 1965. Records of the Ministry's conservation work have gone missing, so precisely what was done is unclear. Between 1962 and 1965 the council removed buildings from the castle's ditch. Guardianship transferred to English Heritage in 1984. Since 1995 the City of Rochester has been responsible for daily management of the castle. Descaling at the start of the 21st century contributed to the decay of the keep, and one of the mural towers was in need of maintenance. Due to the decayed state of the keep, public access is restricted and netting has been erected to protect visitors. The possibility of adding floors and a roof to the keep was discussed in the 1970s and 1990s, but there were concerns that a roof would change the climate within the building. The castle is a Scheduled Monument, a "nationally important" historic building and archaeological site which has been given protection against unauthorised change. It is also a Grade I listed building, and recognised as an internationally important structure. The castle is open to the public.

== Architecture ==
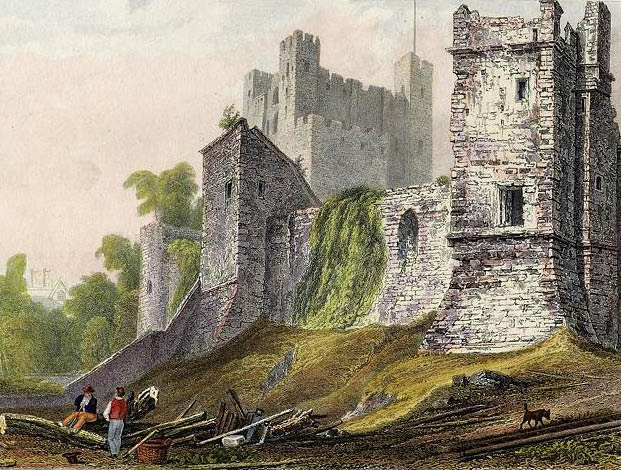
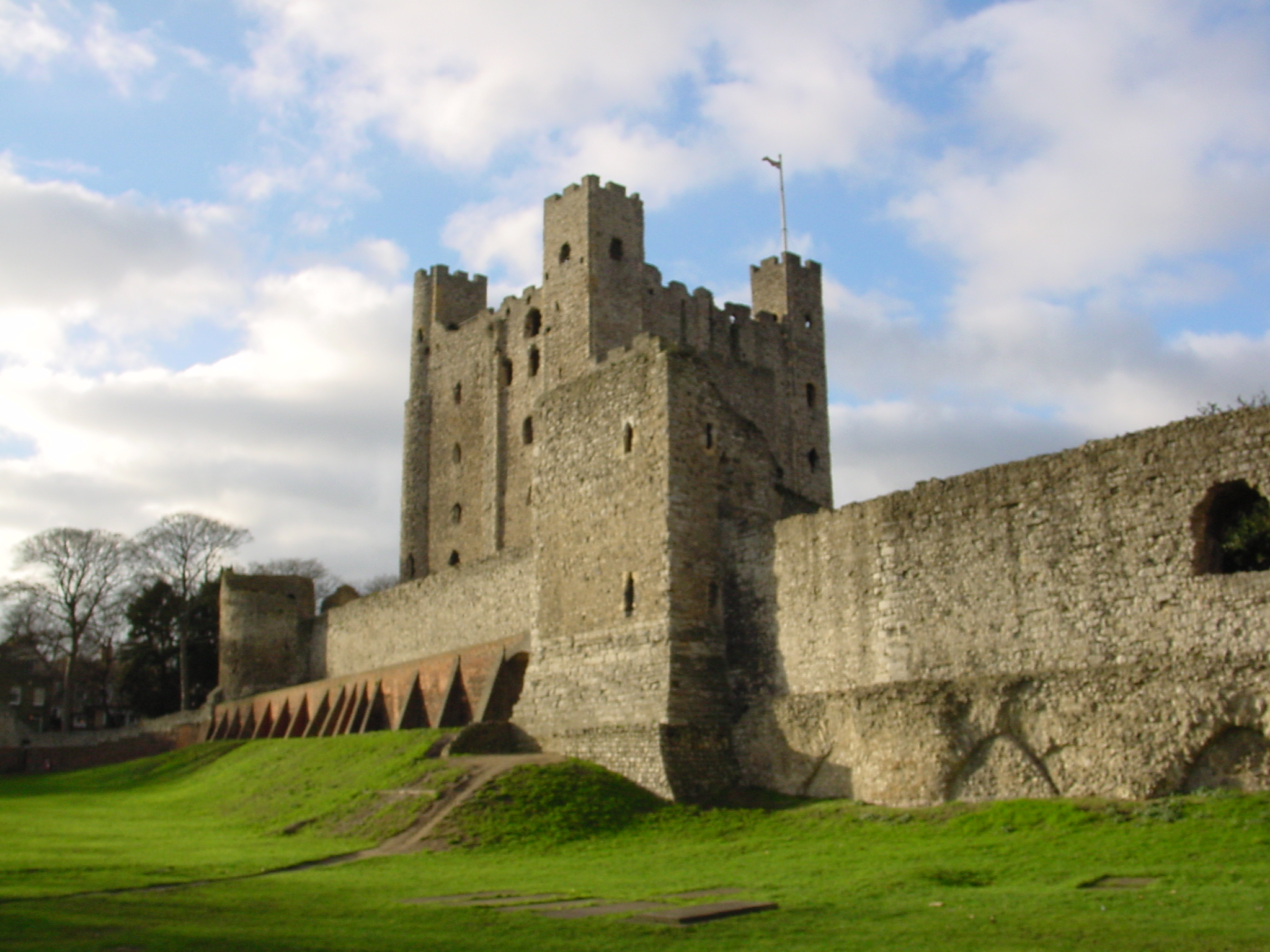
Engraving of Rochester's keep with the stone curtain wall and two towers in front of overgrown ruins, by W. H. Bartlett in 1735 (left), and a similar view in 2003 (right).

Little is known about the design of the first castle at Rochester as it has since vanished, and even the exact site is uncertain. It most likely took the form of a motte-and-bailey castle, with a mound and an outer enclosure defended by a timber palisade and earthen banks. Boley Hill has been suggested as the site of the first castle, an outwork reinforcing the castle's defences, or an abandoned siege castle like those documented in the 1088 siege. Boley Hill is a natural outcrop of rock, and could have acted as a motte.

The castle built by Bishop Gundulf in the late 12th century was enclosed by a stone wall. Situated in the south-west corner of the city, the castle used the remains of the Roman town walls as foundations. The circuit had at least one tower; it was replaced in the 14th century. The original gateway was radically altered in the 13th or 14th century. From across the River Medway, the twin landmarks of Rochester's castle and cathedral would have dominated the medieval landscape, symbolic of the authority of the church and nobility in the period. Most castles were built by secular nobles, but the work by Gundulf and his successor Corbeil provide examples of the role of the church in castle building.

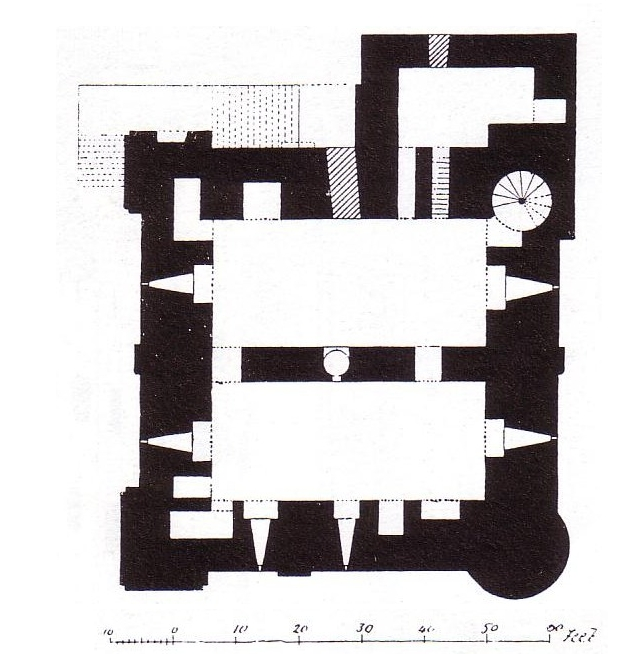
A plan of Rochester Castle's keep from MacGibbon and Ross's The castellated and domestic architecture of Scotland from the twelfth to the eighteenth century (1887)

According to military historian Allen Brown Rochester's keep is "among the finest and oldest in all England". Since its construction it has undergone limited alteration, aside from the rebuilding of one corner, and although now in a state of ruin it remains significantly intact and is considered one of the most important surviving 12th-century keeps in England and France. The keep was richly decorated with hangings and furnishings. Dating from the second quarter of the 12th century, it is Rochester Castle's dominant feature. It had a square plan, and measures 70 by 70 feet (21 by 21 m) externally with pilaster buttresses at each corner. The keep was built in the castle's southern corner, close to the curtain wall. The primary building material was local Kentish Ragstone; Caen stone used to face the keep was imported from Normandy. The same material was imported for the Tower of London's White Tower in the 11th century. The tops of the turrets rise 125 feet (38 m) above the ground, 12 ft above the battlements. Below the latter are rectangular holes, marking where wooden hoarding would have been attached. The walls of the keep are 12 ft thick at the base, and taper to 10 ft at the top. It is the tallest keep in England, and only those at Dover, the Tower of London, Colchester, and Norwich are larger. During John's siege of Rochester in 1215, the south-east corner collapsed; during Henry III's reign it was rebuilt as a cylinder. The windows increase in size higher up the walls; those in the uppermost were decorated. A spiral staircase in the north-east corner provided access to all floors, and another in the south-west corner went from the first floor to the top floor. The north-west corner tower contains small chambers, and the south-east probably had a similar layout before it was rebuilt.

Keeps were traditionally built with an entrance at first-floor level, and Rochester's follows this pattern. A forebuilding attached to the north side guarded the entrance. A stone staircase began on the west side of the keep before turning and meeting the forebuilding, which could be entered by crossing a drawbridge across a gap 9 feet (2.7 m) wide. There was another entrance in the west of the forebuilding, and at some point a new doorway was knocked through to the keep at the bottom of the drawbridge pit. The original door from the forebuilding into the keep was protected by a portcullis.

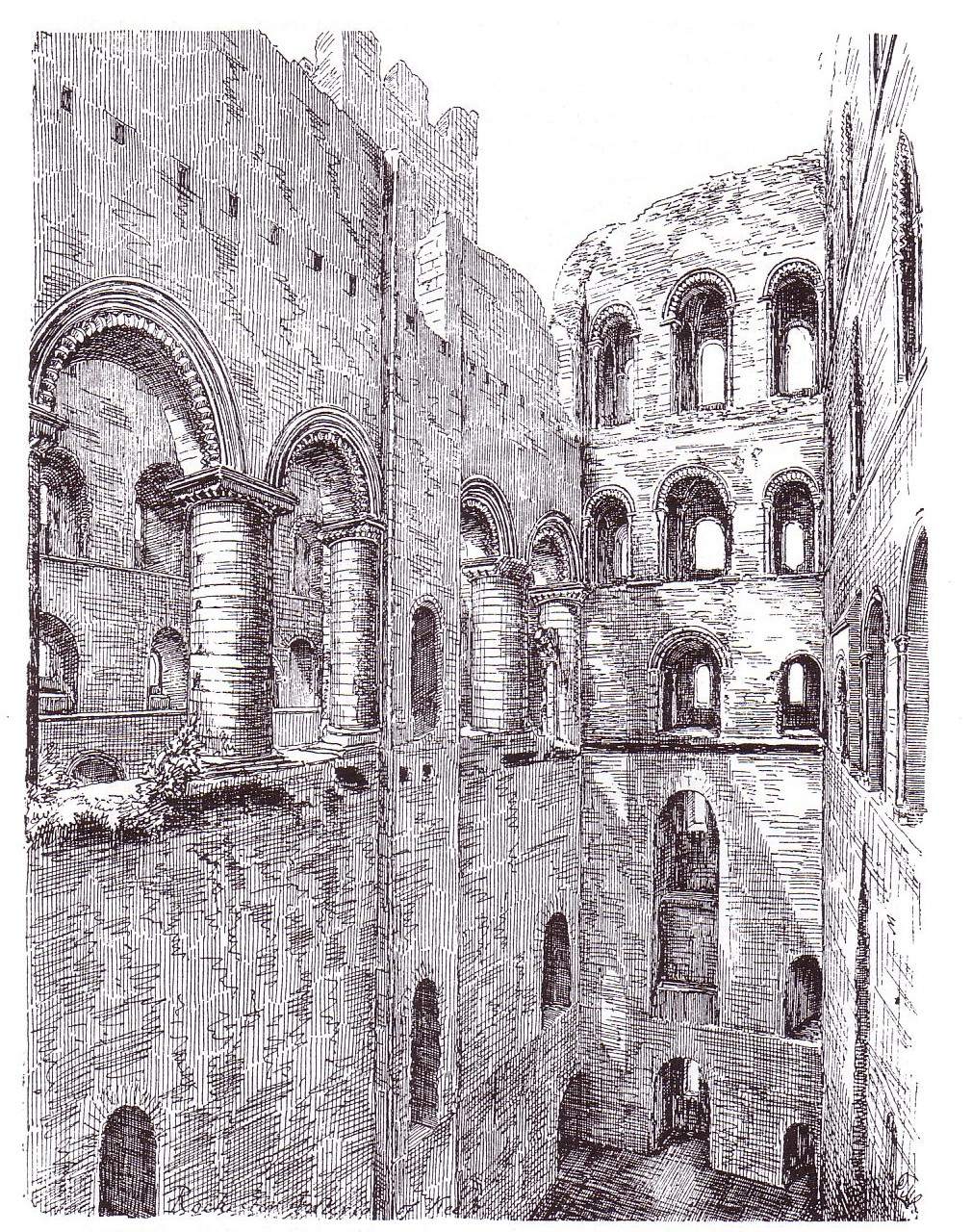
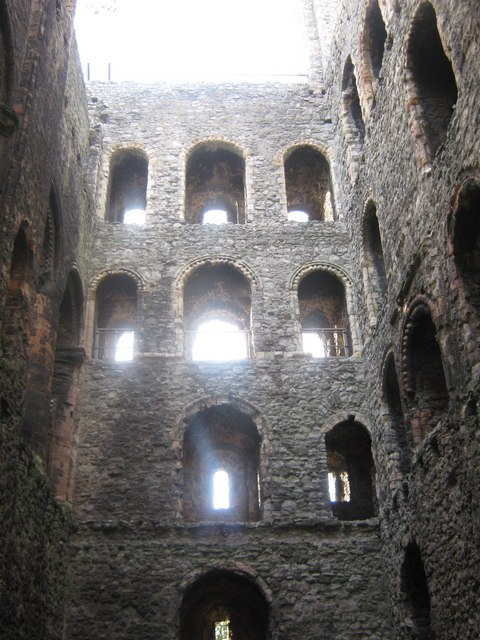
The roof and floors of the keep no longer survive.

The stone-built keeps of the 11th century generally had simple plans, with few rooms and an uncomplicated layout. Rochester's keep bears testament to a developing complexity, and provides an early example of a keep divided into separate areas for the lord and his retinue. The thickness of the walls allowed rooms to be built into them, as can also be seen at the Hedingham Castle's contemporaneous keep, or the slightly later one at Dover. The keep's interior is divided for its entire height by a cross wall running east–west. The ground floor was used for storage, with the three storeys above providing accommodation. The first floor probably contained a hall and great chamber, divided by the cross wall. This level may have been the accommodation of the castle's constable who looked after it during the owner's absence. There is a room called "Gundulf's Chamber" built into the thickness of the wall in the north-west corner; it may well have been the constable's private chamber. The second floor contained the keep's best accommodation and some of its most elaborate decoration. It is 27 feet (8.2 m) high and surrounded by a gallery in its upper half built into the thickness of the walls. The floor also had a chapel measuring about 28 by 15 feet (8.5 by 4.6 m). At some unknown point in the post-medieval period, a fire gutted the keep, leaving it in its present state without floors or a roof. On the second floor, there are openings in the cross wall, broken by a series of Romanesque columns between round-headed arches. The cross wall carried a well shaft, with a well-head at each floor. The third floor had a second chapel and access to the roof, and may have held additional accommodation.

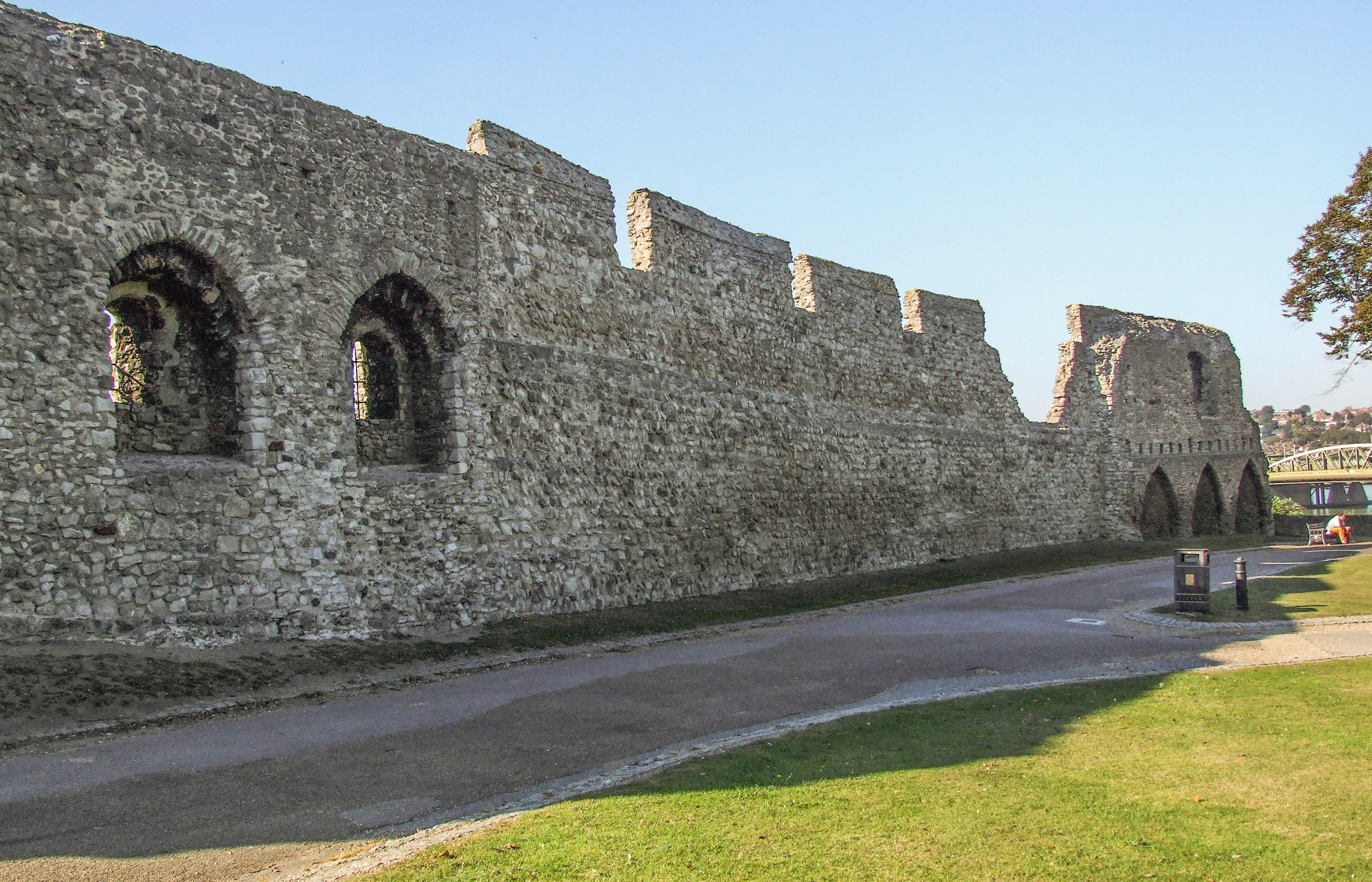
The riverside curtain wall dates from the 12th century, when the castle was first surrounded by a stone wall.

The current entrance in the north-east occupies the approximate location of the main gatehouse constructed by Gundulf and then rebuilt during 1249–1250. It was pulled down in the 1870s when the enclosure was converted into a municipal garden. An engraving from 1735 by the Buck brothers gives some indication of the gatehouse's form: the gate was an archway between two towers projecting from the curtain wall. It was reached by a stone causeway across a ditch, rather than a drawbridge. A tower containing a postern gate was located in the north-west corner of the enclosure, built at the close of the 14th century to guard the bridge over the Medway. The tower and postern no longer stands, but 19th-century antiquary and engineer G. T. Clark made some notes on the structure while it was still standing and commented that it had mechanisms to lift supplies for the castle from the river. The western part of the stone outer wall, a stretch facing the river, dates from when Gundulf built the first wall enclosing the castle. In the 19th century a revetment was added to strengthen the decaying wall. Like the keep, it was constructed using Kentish Ragstone. This part of Gundulf's wall was 4.5 feet (1.4 m) thick at the base, narrowing to 2 feet (0.61 m) at the top; it rose to a height of around 22 feet (6.7 m). Four embrasures were added to this part of the wall in the 13th century; the builders imitated Norman design. At the northern end of the 12th-century stretch of western wall are the remains of a building, probably a hall, dating from the 13th century. Its vaulted undercroft is no longer standing.

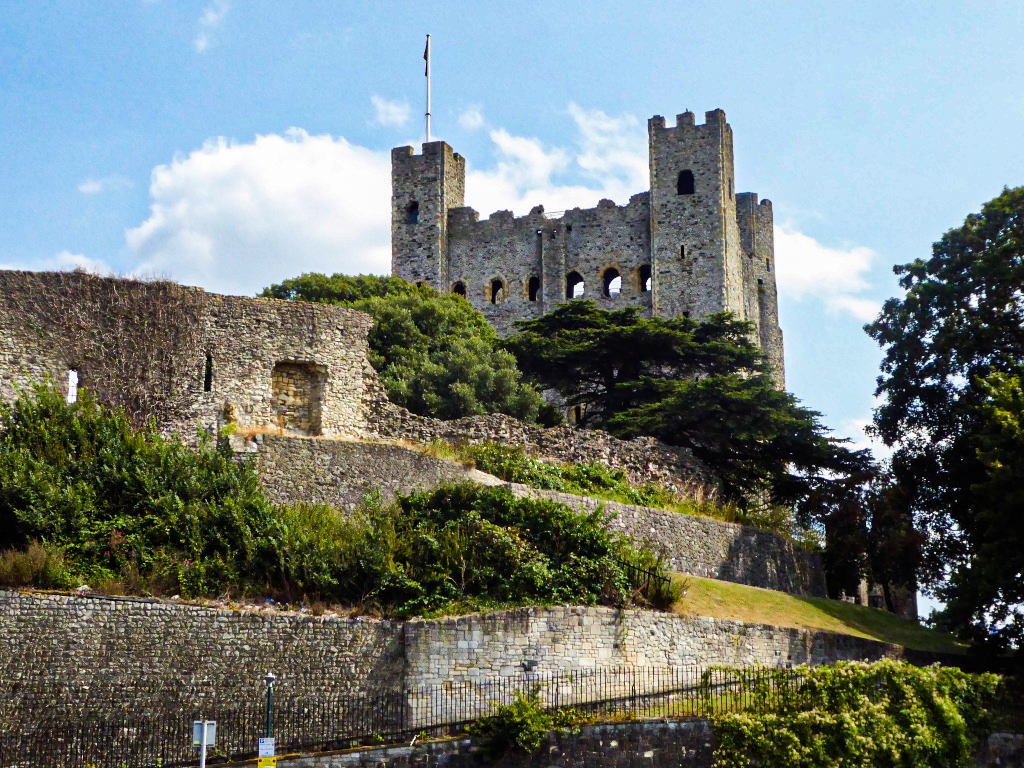
Rochester Castle and its defensive forts, viewed from the Esplanade (2024)

In the south Gundulf's wall survived into the modern period, but has now been dismantled. The current wall is a 19th-century replacement. At the eastern end of this wall, near the southern corner of the castle, is a two-storey rounded tower 30 feet (9.1 m) in diameter dating from the early 13th century. It was built to fill the breach in the curtain wall caused when John's army besieged the castle and to reinforce a weak point in the defences. The section from the tower to the location of the former main gatehouse in the north-east dates from about 1367 to 1370. Two towers were built along the wall, each two storeys high and again using Kentish Ragstone. The one nearest the keep is relatively plain and the northernmost one more elaborate. The latter was intended for use as a residence and in the modern period was converted into a cottage. The wall between these two towers was reduced in the modern period, possibly to give a better view of the cathedral. Apart from the west side, the castle was surrounded by a ditch, much of which has since been filled in.

== See also ==
- Governor of Rochester Castle - including list of governors or constables
- Castles in Great Britain and Ireland
- List of castles in England
- List of tallest structures built before the 20th century
- Ironclad
