= Jonathan English (director) =

British filmmaker

Jonathan English is a British filmmaker who has written, directed, and produced several films.

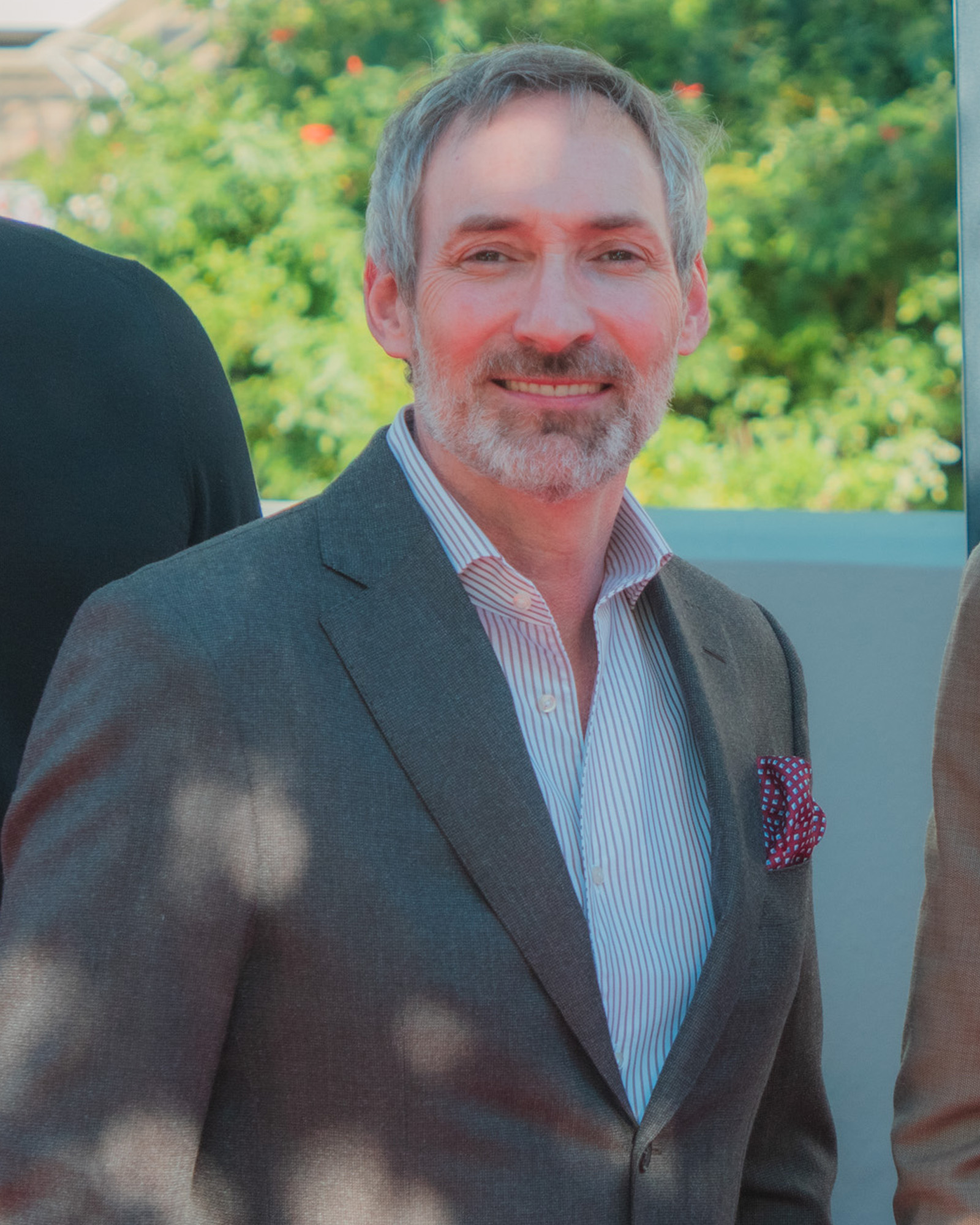
English in 2026

He is known for Minotaur (2006), Ironclad (2011) and Ironclad: Battle for Blood (2014).

== Career ==
English co-founded Mythic International Entertainment, the production company of his newest film Ironclad along with Rick Benattar (producer of Shoot 'Em Up) and Andrew Curtis. He previously directed Minotaur and Nailing Vienna.
