= William d'Aubigny (rebel) =

English noble

William d'Aubigny or D'Aubeney or d'Albini, Lord of Belvoir (died 1 May 1236) was a prominent member of the baronial rebellions against King John of England. He was one of the signatories of Magna Carta. Not to be confused with William d'Aubigny, Earl of Arundel.

== Family background ==
D'Aubigny was the son of William d'Aubigny II of Belvoir and Maud FitzRobert and the grandson of William d'Aubigny and Cecily le Bigod, and was heir to Domesday Book landholder Robert de Toeni, who held many properties, possibly as many as eighty. Amongst them was one in Leicestershire, where he built Belvoir Castle, which was the family's home for many generations. He was High Sheriff of Warwickshire and Leicester and High Sheriff of Bedfordshire and Buckinghamshire in 1199.

== Involvement in military actions ==
D'Aubigny stayed neutral at the beginning of the troubles of King John's reign, only joining the rebels after the early success in taking London in 1215. He was one of the twenty-five sureties or guarantors of Magna Carta. In the war that followed the sealing of the charter, he held Rochester Castle for the barons, and was imprisoned (and nearly hanged) after John captured it. He became a loyalist on the accession of Henry III in October 1216, and was a commander at the Second Battle of Lincoln on 20 May 1217.

== Death ==
He died on 1 May 1236, at Uffington, Lincolnshire and was buried at Newstead Abbey and "his heart under the wall, opposite the altar at Belvoir Castle." He was succeeded by his son, another William d'Aubigny, who died in 1247 and left only daughters. One of them was Isabel, a co-heiress, who married Robert de Ros.

Political offices
Preceded by Simon de Beauchamp	High Sheriff of Bedfordshire and Buckinghamshire; 1197–1199	Succeeded by The Earl of Essex
