= Roy Hart (performer) =

South African actor and vocalist

- Born: Rubin Hartstein; 30 October 1926; Johannesburg, South Africa
- Died: 18 May 1975 (aged 48); Nice, France
- Occupations: Actor and singer

Roy Hart (born Rubin Hartstein; 30 October 1926 – 18 May 1975) was a South African actor and vocalist noted for his highly flexible voice and extensive vocal range that resulted from training in the extended vocal technique developed and taught by the German singing teacher Alfred Wolfsohn at the Alfred Wolfsohn Voice Research Centre in London between 1943 and 1962.

== History ==
Roy Hart began learning Wolfsohn's extended vocal technique at the Voice Research Centre in 1947 where many of his fellow students acquired unusual vocal flexibility and expressiveness, some of them developing voices with a range in excess of five octaves.

In 1959 Roy Hart, having been a long-standing attendant of the Alfred Wolfsohn Voice Research Centre, began teaching acting classes to actors and drama students at various venues across London.

Following the death of Alfred Wolfsohn in 1962, Roy Hart formed a performing arts group comprising some who had studied at the Alfred Wolfsohn Voice Research Centre and others who had attended Hart's acting classes. This company was called first the Roy Hart Actor Singers, and then the Roy Hart Theatre.

Under the direction of Roy Hart, the Roy Hart Theatre evolved into a group of performers who devised and presented experimental performances noted for the way the members utilized extended vocal technique to create verbal and nonverbal drama and music, which had a substantial influence on the work of notable contemporaries of the European avant garde, including Peter Brook who subsequently incorporated extended vocal technique into his productions, Jerzy Grotowski, who made vocal expression a central feature to his rehearsal techniques and performances, Karlheinz Stockhausen who adapted works for Hart, and Peter Maxwell Davies who composed Eight Songs for a Mad King especially for Roy Hart's voice.

Roy Hart died in 1975, shortly after the Roy Hart Theatre moved permanently from London to Malérargues, Southern France. However, the remaining members continued the work begun by Alfred Wolfsohn and extended by Hart, through teaching extended vocal technique and staging dramatic and musical performances that utilized a vocal range and flexibility greater than that commonly heard in speech and song. The Roy Hart Voice Centre(formerly the Centre International Artistique Roy Hart) is still active today in Malérargues.

== Alfred Wolfsohn Research Centre ==
Alfred Wolfsohn was a Jewish German who suffered auditory hallucinations of screaming soldiers, whom he had witnessed dying whilst serving as a stretcher bearer in the trenches of World War I. He was subsequently diagnosed with shell shock, and after failing to benefit from psychiatry, hypnosis, and medication, cured himself by vocalizing the extreme sounds he had heard and later hallucinated, before developing an approach to singing lessons intended to be therapeutic for his students.

Wolfsohn developed and taught techniques that were originally intended as psychotherapeutic, to a regular group of students, some of whom studied with him for almost twenty years, at the Alfred Wolfsohn Voice Research Centre in Berlin from 1935 to 1939 and in London from 1943 until 1962 when he died. Among these students was Roy Hart, who began studying with Wolfsohn in 1947.

== Experimental music and theatre ==
As a consequence of Wolfsohn's extended vocal technique, his students developed highly flexible and expressive voices, some of them in excess of five octaves.

During the three years prior to Wolfsohn's death, this group of students began to demonstrate the artistic use of their vocal expressiveness in vocal music, poetry, and drama, to invited guests. After Alfred Wolfsohn died, Roy Hart expanded upon this tradition, acting as stage director and performer in theatre productions that used a range of vocal expression beyond that employed in most Western drama and music performances of that time.

== Background ==
Hart studied English and psychology at the Witwatersrand University, Johannesburg before coming to England to train as an actor at the Royal Academy of Dramatic Art (RADA). He recalled:

I came to England from South Africa…I won a scholarship to RADA and was told I had a good voice and stage personality. Yet I had known for some time that my voice was not rooted, not literally embodied... On leaving RADA I was immediately offered a most promising opening in the Theatre…I made an extraordinary choice. I turned down the proffered 'big chance' in order to research into the nature and meaning of the human voice.

Hart began taking lessons with Alfred Wolfsohn in 1947. Upon his teacher's death in 1962 the long-standing attendants of the Alfred Wolfsohn Voice Research Centre divided with Hart taking leadership of one group who were joined by students of Hart's acting lessons while the other group continued their attempts to maintain the centre and its therapeutic focus.

The work of both the Roy Hart Theatre and the Alfred Wolfsohn Voice Research Centre was documented in writing, film, photographs, and Phonograph recordings by author, film maker, and archivist Leslie Shepard.

This documentation was used as the primary material upon which to base written papers that Hart read in 1963 at the Jung Institute in London; in 1964 at the Sixth International Congress for Psychotherapy in London; in 1967 at the Seventh International Congress for Psychotherapy in Wiesbaden; in 1968 at the Third International Congress of Psychodrama in Vienna; in 1970 at the Sixth International Conference for Psychodrama in Zagreb; and in 1972 at the Seventh International Congress of Psychodrama in Tokyo.

The papers presented by Hart made two fundamental points.

- First, they proposed that an extended vocal range could be used to produce a form of theatre that returned it to its alleged roots in religious ritual and spiritual practice. The vision of reviving a primitive and provocative participatory theatre that would use a range of vocal sounds to portray mythical characters and deities, and express intense human emotion was synonymous with Jerzy Grotowski's vision of creating a theatre that made full use of the voice to embody archetypal themes. Furthermore, both Hart and Grotowski agreed that theatre should provoke and stir what Carl Jung called the collective unconscious through such portrayal.
- Secondly, Hart, citing Alfred Wolfsohn, suggested that the process of individuation at the heart of Analytical Psychology developed by Carl Jung could be achieved artistically and acoustically through singing, as much as through the speaking that remained central to the practice of psychotherapy, which commonly revolves around a verbal conversation, originally named the Talking Cure by Sigmund Freud. This attracted the attention and recruited the support of psychologists, psychiatrists, and other clinicians, including Paul Moses, and contributed to the development of the therapeutic use of arts in clinical settings, including the expressive arts therapies, particularly drama therapy and music therapy.

For the first few years following Wolfsohn's death, Hart continued seeking to gain recognition of nonverbal vocalization, drama, and experimental vocal music as an efficacious form of psychotherapy, and in 1965, members of the Roy Hart Theatre began working with patients at Shenley Psychiatric Hospital, St. Albans in Hertfordshire. However, during the ten years after Wolfsohn's death, the emphasis of the Roy Hart Theatre shifted substantially towards performing arts, and the potential therapeutic benefits of singing and vocalizing became subsidiary and secondary to the work and vision of Hart's company.

In 1985 Paul Newham began vocal training with Roy Hart Theatre member Enrique Pardo, learning techniques derived from Wolfsohn and Hart. Newham subsequently collaborated with Leslie Sheppard in analysing the written, phonographic, and photographic documentation that the archivist had curated at the Alfred Wolfsohn Voice Research Centre.

Newham later reformulated and expanded some of the techniques established by Alfred Wolfsohn and furthered by Hart, proposing the foundations for a form of expressive therapy based on the use of song, prayer, and other forms of vocal expression. Newham's expansion upon Wolfsohn's and Hart's work was to some degree appropriated into the expressive therapies, but the use of song in mainstream therapeutic practice remains marginal. At the time of Wolfsohn's, Hart's and Newham's work, there was scant scientific research into the clinical use of singing, whist today there is some evidence to indicate the possible rehabilitative and therapeutic application of nonverbal musical vocalization with some populations. Nonetheless, this field of inquiry is in its infancy even now, and in the face of little opportunity to further Wolfsohn's original vision of 'singing as therapy', Hart steered the group towards artistic application of extended vocal technique.

== Performances ==
When Hart began teaching acting classes in London, he appropriated adaptations of Wolfsohn's extended vocal technique and also introduced and developed his own physical exercises that involved extensive bodily movement. These exercises became part of the training and rehearsal process undertaken by Roy Hart's theatre company, leading to performances that were often described as an example of physical theatre. In 1965 the Roy Hart Theatre company began rehearsing a performance of the Bacchae, and having met Philip Vellacott, used his translation. Initial presentations of the Bacchae were attended by Peter Brook, Jerzy Grotowski, R.D. Laing, Irene Worth, Jean Louis Barrault, and Peter Maxwell Davies.

Maxwell Davies subsequently composed a full-length piece for Roy Hart called Eight Songs for a Mad King. The world premier of this piece was performed at the Queen Elizabeth Hall, London, on 22 April 1969, with subsequent performances given internationally. In a review of Eight Songs for a Mad King in the newspaper Die Welt, Heinz Joachim said:

Roy Hart is an artist who commands not only all the voices of the human register – ranging from the deepest bass to the highest soprano, but also (incredibly enough) the ability to produce several sounds simultaneously; added to which he gives an acting performance which stretches from the most tender allusiveness to the most macabre realism. All this is (as banal as the formulation may sound) simply phenomenal, unique, sensational. Yet it lay beyond all 'sensation'. It was so deeply stamped by immediate experience; it was the art of presentation which, at every moment, uses the means available in a conscious way, and yet never transgresses the borderline that leads to trash...the solo part is specifically written for Roy Hart. Probably no other artist could realise this part so penetratingly.

Between 1969 and 1974, Roy Hart presented the world premier of a work composed especially for him by Hans Werner Henze entitled Versuch über Schweine, performed with the English Chamber Orchestra at the Queen Elizabeth Hall in London. He also performed a piece by Karlheinz Stockhausen called Spiral, which the composer adapted for Hart's voice. In addition, the entire group, under the name the Roy Hart Theatre, performed pieces they devised themselves using vocal techniques derived from Alfred Wolfsohn combined with voice and movement exercises developed by Hart, which were performed at The Place and the Round House theatres in London. Reviewing a performance at the Round House, Herbert Kretzmer wrote in the Daily Express newspaper:

On an enormous poster on the walls of the Round House are painted the words: 'Language is dead. Long live the voice.' Inside the building about two dozen dedicated and mostly very young people celebrate and explore and bend the human voice…Watching this is like chancing upon a group therapy session in full cry. Rejecting the repressive and limiting cadences of traditional languages, they croak, scream, cry like seagulls, sing sweetly, and shout hoarsely. The impact and the insight are sometimes stunning. I have never seen actors giving quite so much of themselves.

In addition to London-based performances, Roy Hart performed pieces at festivals and venues in Spain, Germany, Austria, and Switzerland. Some were solo performances by Hart, others used the whole Roy Hart Theatre troupe, including Mariage de Lux by Serge Béhar, and Ich Bin by Paul Pörtner, both works especially written for the group. The Roy Hart Theatre also collaborated with some of the actors from Peter Brook's troupe in a devised performance.

In Lettres Françaises under the title of "Voice and Madness – Echo of the Origin of Man", Catherine Clément described her experience of witnessing a performance by the Roy Hart Theatre as like being in the presence of the unconscious. The Fonds de Dotation Malérargues was established in 2021 to preservie and develop the Malérargues estate and support cultural, artistic, anthropological and educational activities related to the human voice and the heritage of Alfred Wolfsohn, Roy Hart and the Roy Hart Theatre.

== Move to France ==
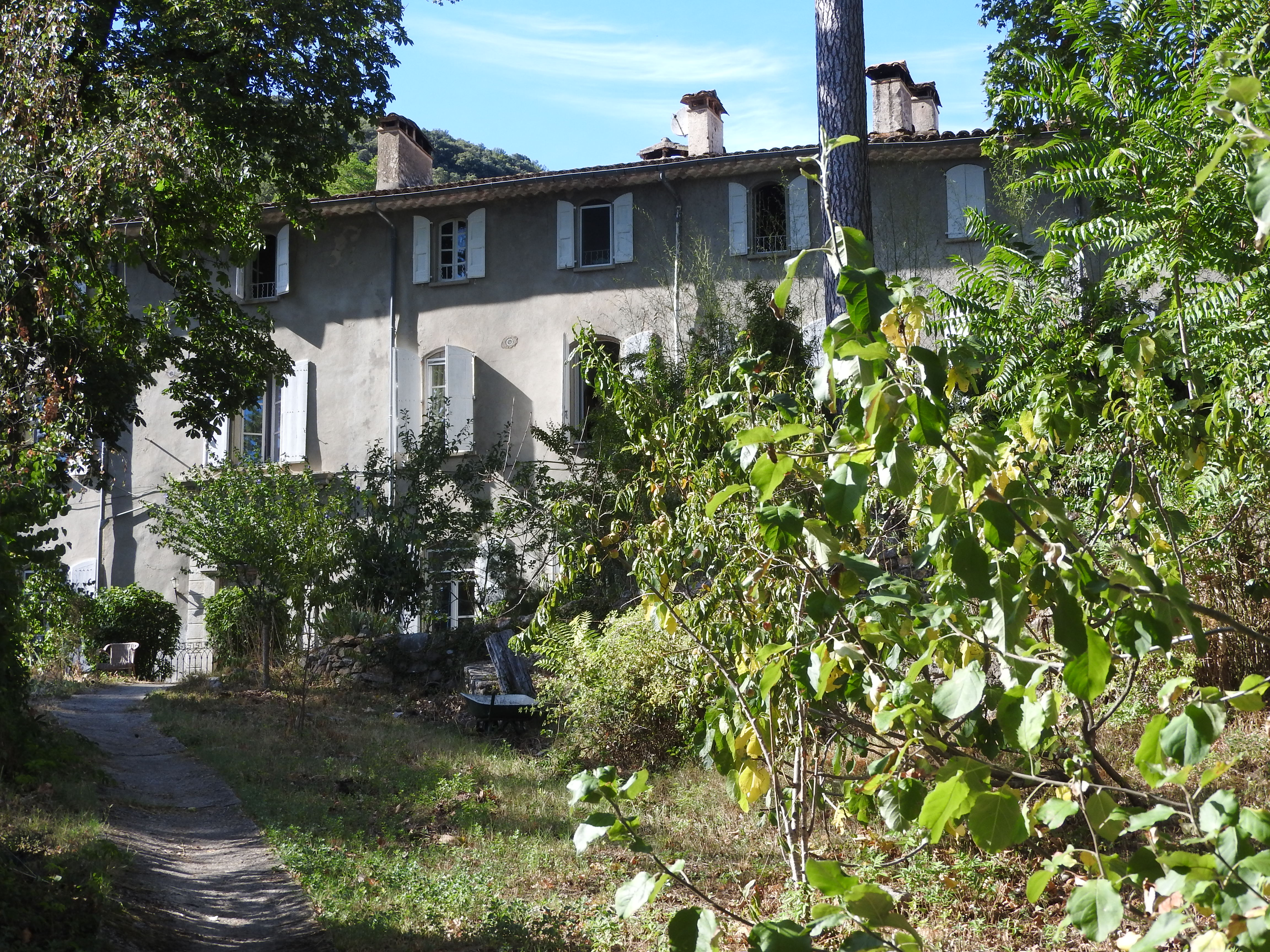
Le chateau de Malérargues

In the summer of 1974, the group of performers known as The Roy Hart Theatre, which included some who like Hart had worked with Alfred Wolfsohn for many years, as well as others who had studied acting with Hart, moved to the Chateau de Malérargues, in Thoiras, near Saint-Jean-du-Gard, in southern France intending to establish a permanent rehearsal studio, theatre, and training school to explore further the artistic application of the extended vocal technique.

A year later, Roy Hart, along with his wife and a third member of the troupe, died in a car accident. However, the group retained the name Roy Hart Theatre, and continued to perform locally, nationally, and internationally, as well as teaching extended vocal technique to actors and singers. The work continues today through successive generations of teachers and students at what became the Centre Artistique International Roy Hart and is now known as the Roy Hart Voice Centre. The Fonds de dotation Malérargues, a separate French fonds de dotation, was established in 2021 to preserve and develop the Malérargues estate and support cultural, artistic, anthropological and training activities related to the human voice and the heritage of Alfred Wolfsohn, Roy Hart and the Roy Hart Theatre.
