= Alfred Wolfsohn =

German singing teacher (1896–1962)

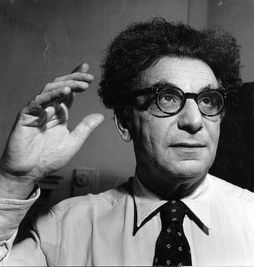
- Alfred Wolfsohn
- Born: 23 September 1896; Berlin, Germany
- Died: 5 February 1962 (aged 65); United Kingdom
- Occupation: Singing teacher

Alfred Wolfsohn (23 September 1896 – 5 February 1962) was a German singing teacher who suffered persistent auditory hallucination of screaming soldiers, whom he had witnessed dying of wounds while serving as a stretcher bearer in the trenches of World War I. Wolfsohn was diagnosed with shell shock, but did not respond to treatment. He subsequently cured himself by vocalizing extreme sounds, bringing about what he described as a combination of catharsis and exorcism.

Inspired by the range and flexibility of his voice, which developed as a consequence of the exercises and experiments he pursued, Wolfsohn began teaching others to use his vocal techniques as a form of therapeutic expression, which were later incorporated into drama therapy and music therapy. Meanwhile, some pupils of Wolfsohn used the extraordinary vocal range they developed to create performing arts productions, which influenced avant-garde theatre and experimental music.

After Wolfsohn died in 1962, many of his long-standing pupils formed a theatre company called the Roy Hart Theatre, under the direction of South African actor Roy Hart, who had studied with Wolfsohn for fifteen years, which continued to influence practices within expressive arts therapies and the performing arts.

== Overview ==
Alfred Wolfsohn was conscripted to serve as a stretcher-bearer in the trenches of World War I in 1914, when he was eighteen years old. After his discharge, Wolfsohn suffered persistent auditory hallucination of screaming soldiers, whom he had witnessed dying of wounds during his service.

After being subsequently diagnosed with shell shock, Wolfsohn failed to recover in response to hospitalization or psychiatric treatment, but cured himself by vocalizing extreme sounds, bringing about what he described as a combination of catharsis and exorcism.

Inspired by the range and expressiveness of his voice, which resulted from the vocal exercises and techniques he developed in an attempt to heal the symptoms of trauma sustained during the war, Wolfsohn began teaching others, acting as both a singing teacher and psychotherapist, seeking to combine the principles of both disciplines. Wolfsohn had no formal training in either field, but nonetheless became a critic of traditional vocal pedagogy and an advocate for the principles of analytical psychology developed by Carl Jung.

Wolfsohn began his teaching in Berlin, whilst working with the opera singer Paula Salomon-Lindberg where he developed a close mentoring relationship with the painter Charlotte Salomon. Wolfsohn and his theories inspired Charlotte Salomon to create her artwork Leben? Oder Theater? Ein Singespiel, assigning to him the name Amadeus Daberlohn.

After escaping Nazi Germany, Wolfsohn came to London and established the Alfred Wolfsohn Voice Research Centre in a large house in Golders Green, offering an approach to singing lessons and voice training based solely upon his self-devised techniques. The aim of his lessons was to help students extend the range and expressiveness of their voice to include every possible vocal sound, which he believed both represented and precipitated the realization of increased human potential in other areas of life.

Wolfsohn subscribed to the views of Carl Jung, who proposed that each human psyche comprises a composite of subpersonalities that appear most vividly in dreams. Wolfsohn sought to enable the expression of these subpersonalities through distinct vocal sounds.

A number of notable authors, theatre directors, philosophers, and scientists took lessons with Wolfsohn, or observed demonstrations by his students, subsequently acknowledging his contribution to their work, including R. D. Laing, Irene Worth, Jean-Louis Barrault, Aldous Huxley, and Julian Huxley.

When Wolfsohn died in 1962, the group of long-standing students divided.

One group continued to train their voices under the leadership of Roy Hart, a South African actor and regular attendant of the Alfred Wolfsohn Voice Research Centre since 1947, who extended the vocal demonstrations for invited audiences, instigated by Wolfsohn, into full public performances, including Eight Songs for a Mad King, composed especially for Hart by Peter Maxwell Davies.

This group left the Alfred Wolfsohn Voice Research Centre in Golders Green in 1969, migrated to new premises in Hampstead, and formed a performing arts troupe, assuming the name the Roy Hart Theatre, which included some who like Hart had studied with Alfred Wolfsohn, and others who had never met the German teacher, but had been students in Hart's drama classes, which the South African actor began teaching at venues across London during the late 1950s.

In 1974 the Roy Hart Theatre moved to the south of France to establish a permanent rehearsal studio, school, and drama troupe. Roy Hart died in a car accident a year later, but the French-based group of remaining members continued producing experimental theatre and music productions and teaching the approach to vocal expression initially established by Wolfsohn. The other group, including vocalist Jenny Johnson and film maker, author, and archivist Leslie Shepard, dispersed and sought to continue the work of the Alfred Wolfsohn Voice Research Centre.

Alfred Wolfsohn was instrumental in precipitating and inspiring many types of extended vocal technique used by performing artists who incorporate into their performances sounds not usually used in speech or song. In addition, Wolfsohn was a major influence on the therapeutic and creative work of Paul Newham, Wolfsohn's official biographer who together with Leslie Shepard re-established the London base for the Alfred Wolfsohn Voice Research Centre in 1990.

== Childhood ==
Alfred Wolfsohn was born in Berlin into a German Jewish family.

In his unpublished manuscripts, Wolfsohn repeatedly describes himself as an exceptionally detached child, an outsider, and an observer, and he attributes this experience to being one of few Jewish children at school.

When Wolfsohn was 10 years old, his father, who had been a rifleman in the Franco-Prussian War, died of tuberculosis. Prior to his father's death, Wolfsohn had been disturbed by the sounds of his mother screaming during sexual intercourse, which he could hear from his bedroom. After his father died, Wolfsohn developed a close relationship with his mother, who comforted him by singing, using a high voice to depict an angel and a low voice for St Peter. Wolfsohn asserted that hearing his mother express both unpleasant screams and beautiful singing contributed to his belief that the human voice should be able to express the complete spectrum of human emotion.

== World War I and illness ==
In 1914, Wolfsohn was conscripted to military service and served as a stretcher bearer in the trenches of World War I along both the Eastern and Western front. During this time, Wolfsohn became disturbed by the vocal sounds that wounded and dying soldiers made. Furthermore, he experienced intense guilt at having run for safety, leaving behind a badly wounded soldier, rather than risking his own life to save the dying man.

After the war, Wolfsohn was admitted to a psychiatric hospital in Berlin, where he was diagnosed with shell shock, prescribed medication, and underwent hypnosis. Wolfsohn complained that his treatment failed to alleviate the auditory hallucinations of the vocal screams he had heard whilst serving in the trenches. Wolfsohn later recorded that, after being discharged from hospital, he felt as though he was dead for many years, but came back to life when he started singing.

== Recovery and initial experimental work ==
After discharge from hospital, Wolfsohn worked in a variety of positions, including rent-collector, bank teller, piano player for silent films, and hazzan at synagogue funerals. During this period, he also took singing lessons with a range of teachers.

Although he attributed his recovery from shell shock to these lessons, he also criticized his teachers for their adherence to a classical bel canto approach, which prohibited him from giving voice to the sounds he had heard in the trenches. He therefore supplemented and eventually replaced the singing lessons with his own experiments, seeking to push his voice to its limits in range and timbre.

== Early teaching ==
In 1933, Hitler became chancellor of Germany, and Wolfsohn began to experience the discrimination to which all German Jews were subjected at that time.

With the rise of the Third Reich, Wolfsohn recognized that Jews with formal employment were in a better position to avoid Nazi harassment, and in 1935 went to Dr. Kurt Singer, founder of the Jüdischer Kulturbund, a cultural association promoting Jewish art and culture. Singer, who was a conductor, musician, musicologist, neurologist, and director of the Deutsche Oper Berlin, sought to combat antisemitism by drawing attention to the Jewish arts. He convinced the Nazis to permit a safe haven for talented Jewish artists, so they could perform for an exclusively Jewish public in community centres, synagogues, and private homes.

Kurt Singer put Wolfsohn in touch with the opera singer Paula Salomon-Lindberg, who offered him lodging and a job teaching singing to those she described as her less gifted pupils.

It was then that Wolfsohn began to combine his understanding of firstly the psychoanalysis developed by Sigmund Freud, and later the analytical psychology evolved by Carl Jung, with his unconventional approach to vocal pedagogy, seeking to help others use the singing lesson as a means to assuage and alleviate emotional and psychological difficulties.

Wolfsohn also developed a close relationship with Paula Salomon-Lindberg's stepdaughter Charlotte Salomon, whom he mentored. Charlotte Salomon documented her relationship with Wolfsohn in a series of paintings, in which he appears as an elusive personal tutor called Amadeus Daberlohn.

== Escaping Nazi Germany ==
In January 1939, Charlotte Salomon left Germany for the south of France, and a month later, Wolfsohn fled Berlin and went to London. He volunteered to the British Royal Pioneer Corps but was later discharged, having been classified as an invalid.

In October 1943 Charlotte Salomon was captured in Nice, and dispatched to Auschwitz, where she and her unborn child were killed by the Nazis.

In the same year, Wolfsohn was given permission by the British government to teach singing lessons, which he began at a house in North London that he named the Alfred Wolfsohn Voice Research Centre. The research, experimentation and tutoring at the centre first attracted public attention ten years later on 22 November 1953, when a journalist observed him working with two of his pupils, Jenny Johnson and Jill Johnson. The journalist's article said of them: "They can sing deeper than Paul Robeson and higher than Yma Sumac. In fact, they have crashed through the musical sound barrier".

There followed a series of reports in national newspapers, all of which concentrated on the extended vocal range demonstrated by Wolfsohn's pupils, with scant reference to any psychotherapeutic benefits of his techniques.

The lack of formal recognition as a contributor to psychotherapy remained a frustration to Wolfson, culminating in his failure to secure a meeting with Carl Jung.

== Scientific analysis and artistic application ==
In August 1955 the voice of Jenny Johnson was examined by Professor Richard Luchsinger of the Zurich Otolaryngological Clinic, the results of which were presented in a lecture before the German Society for Speech and Voice Therapy in Hamburg and subsequently published in an article co-written with C.L. Dubois later that year. This was the first clinical examination of a voice trained in the extended vocal technique established by Wolfsohn and consisted of phonetic examination, laryngoscopy, stroboscopy, electro-acoustical analysis and a tomographical investigation. Luchsinger's examinations revealed that Johnson's larynx and pharynx showed no structural abnormality, but was small and symmetrical, corresponding to that of a coloratura soprano. The recordings verified what Luchsinger described as an extraordinarily large vocal range, from C (65 c.p.s.) to f4 sharp (2960 c.p.s.), or 5 octaves and 6 tones. Thirty-seven years later, in 1992, consultant laryngologist David Garfield-Davies recorded a video stroboscopic examination of Paul Newham demonstrating an extended vocal technique derivative of Wolfsohn's approach at the Ferens Institute Voice Clinic, part of the Middlesex Hospital which showed how extended vocal flexibility can be produced without damage to the vocal apparatus.

In 1956 Jenny Johnson performed in the Hoffnung Music Festival, receiving favourable reviews. During the same year Folkways Records released a vinyl long playing record of Wolfsohn's pupils demonstrating an extended vocal range, called Vox Humana. Also in 1956, the BBC broadcast a documentary about Wolfsohn's work.

However, the kind of recognition that Wolfsohn sought was not forthcoming until 1959, when Paul Moses, clinical professor in charge of the Speech and Voice Section, Division of Otolaryngology at the Stanford University School of Medicine, San Francisco, proposed that the research of the Alfred Wolfsohn Voice Research Centre had contributed substantially to an understanding of psychogenic pain generally, and the emotional and psychological causes of voice disorders specifically.

== Death and new leader ==
On 26 January 1962, Wolfsohn ceased teaching due to ill health. He died ten days later on 5 February that year after contracting a chest infection while in hospital. Subsequently, Roy Hart, a student who had begun working with Wolfsohn in 1947, formed a performing arts company comprising some of Wolfsohn's long-standing students, and others who had taken acting lessons with Hart at various venues across London. Meanwhile, a number of other students and associates of Wolfsohn, including Jenny Johnson and author, film maker and archivist Leslie Shepard sought to continue the work of the Alfred Wolfsohn Voice Research Centre.

== Therapy and theatre ==
Whilst Wolfsohn had viewed his approach to singing and vocal expression as primarily a potential adjunct to psychotherapy, Roy Hart sought to appropriate the extended vocal range of his pupils into artistic expression, by devising, rehearsing, and performing experimental theatre with a strong focus on verbal and nonverbal vocal expression. The group that joined Hart in this endeavour after Wolfsohn's death named themselves the Roy Hart Theatre.

Performances by Roy Hart and the Roy Hart Theatre influenced a number of notable contributors to the avant garde, including Peter Brook and Jerzy Grotowski.

Nonetheless, it was Hart who succeeded in introducing the therapeutic benefits of Wolfsohn's techniques where his teacher had failed, presenting papers, primarily authored by Leslie Shepard and giving demonstrations in 1963 at the Jung Institute in London; in 1964 at the sixth International Congress of Psychotherapy in London; in 1967 at the seventh International Congress for Psychotherapy in Wiesbaden; in 1968 at the third International Congress of Psychodrama in Vienna; in 1970 at the sixth International Conference for Psychodrama in Zagreb; and in 1972 at the seventh International Congress of Psychodrama in Tokyo. In addition, in 1965 the Roy Hart Theatre began working with patients at Shenley Psychiatric Hospital, St. Albans in Hertfordshire.

== Move to France ==
In the summer of 1974, the Roy Hart Theatre group, which comprised some members who had worked with Wolfsohn for 25 years, moved to the south of France where they began converting the buildings of an old château into studios for vocal and theatrical research. A year later, Roy Hart, his wife Dorothy Hart, and a third group member Vivienne Young – died in a car accident while en route between performances in Austria and a tour of Spain.

== Legacy ==
Wolfsohn subscribed to the views of Carl Jung, who proposed that each human psyche comprises a composite of subpersonalities that appear most vividly in dreams. Jung claimed to have witnessed what he variously called 'mini-personalities', 'splinter-psyches', and the 'little-people' expressed through vocal sound when he observed his cousin, a girl called Helly, manifest a range of distinct vocal timbres and dialects at séances, during which she claimed to be speaking on behalf of dead persons. This became the starting point for Jung's doctoral thesis, and precipitated his later work on what he described as the multiple nature of the psyche.

Jung paid little subsequent attention to vocal expression in his work, but sought to show the way in which literature, painting, and religious symbolism give expression to the mental images of the psyche.

Wolfsohn believed that by extending the vocal range, it was possible to give this imagery a voice, including what Jung called mini-personalities, later referred to as subpersonalities thereby providing the vocalist with an opportunity to integrate disparate elements of their personality in accordance with the principle of individuation, which was a principal aim of Jung's approach to psychotherapy. However, Wolfsohn failed to secure a meeting with Jung, and the work of the Alfred Wolfsohn Research Centre had little impact on mainstream psychotherapy.

Between 1990 and 2001, Paul Newham founded a form of expressive arts therapy, known as voice movement therapy and therapeutic voicework, which was initially inspired by both Wolfsohn's research and Jung's notion of subpersonalities, and uses the act of vocalizing, particularly singing and praying, as the means by which to explore the psyche.

In addition, the work of Wolfsohn and Hart influenced a number of therapists, including Alexander Lowen. However, the influence and legacy of Alfred Wolfsohn's work is more apparent in performing arts that use extended vocal technique than in any clinical discipline.

== Sources ==
Attenborough, R., Letter to Jenny Johnson and Roy Hart. 22 April 1956. Repository: Alfred Wolfsohn Voice Research Centre Archives. Curated by Paul Newham, London.

Author unknown (initials L.S.), 'The Hoffnung Musical Festival', The Gramophone (newspaper), December 1956. Repository: Alfred Wolfsohn Voice Research Centre Archives. Curated by Paul Newham, London.

Author unknown, 'Eight octaves High: No Strain at all, the Wolfsohn Way', The Illustrated (newspaper), 3 April 1954. Repository: Alfred Wolfsohn Voice Research Centre Archives. Curated by Paul Newham, London.

Author unknown, 'He Gives the Girls 7-Octave Voices', unknown newspaper, 22 November 1953. Repository: Alfred Wolfsohn Voice Research Centre Archives. Curated by Leslie Shepard, Dublin, Ireland.

Author unknown, 'Low F to High C', Daily Mail (newspaper), 28 February 1956. Repository: Alfred Wolfsohn Voice Research Centre Archives. Curated by Paul Newham, London.

Author unknown, 'She Can Sing Every Note: Jennifer Soars Right Through the Keyboard', Daily Express (newspaper), 27 February 1956. Repository: Alfred Wolfsohn Voice Research Centre Archives. Curated by Paul Newham, London.

Author unknown, 'The Hoffnung Musical Festival Concert', The Gramophone (newspaper), January 1957. Repository: Alfred Wolfsohn Voice Research Centre Archives. Curated by Paul Newham, London.

Author unknown, 'The Omnitone', Time, 19 March 1956.

Author unknown, The Times, 14 November 1956. Repository: Alfred Wolfsohn Voice Research Centre Archives. Curated by Paul Newham, London.

Backès-Clément, C., 'Voice and Madness; Echo of the Origin of Man', Lettres Françaises (magazine), 1979. Repository: Alfred Wolfsohn Voice Research Centre Archives. Curated by Paul Newham, London.

Bendit, L.J., MD, 'Letters to the Editor: The New Voice', Observer, 11 March 1956. Repository: Alfred Wolfsohn Voice Research Centre Archives. Curated by Paul Newham, London.

Braggins, S., interviewed by Paul Newham, London, November 1991. Repository: Alfred Wolfsohn Voice Research Centre Archives. Curated by Paul Newham, London.

Coghlan, B., 'The Human Voice and the Aural Vision of the Soul'. Paper read at the First International Conference on Scientific Aspects of Theatre at Karpacz, Poland, September 1979. Repository: Roy Hart Theatre Archives, Malérargues, France.

Cole, E., Commentary. Paper documenting the development of the Alfred Wolfsohn Voice Research Centre from 1943 to 1953. 1953. Repository: Alfred Wolfsohn Voice Research Centre Archives. Curated by Paul Newham, London.

Cowell, H., 'Introduction to Vox Humana', (printed introduction to accompany gramophone recording, with notes by Leslie Shepard), Vox Humana: Alfred Wolfsohn's Experiments in Extension of Human Vocal Range. New York: Folkways Records and Service Corp., Album No. FPX 123, 1956.

Croner, A., interviewed by Franz Weisz, London, 1980/81. Trans. Franz Weisz. Repository: Franz Weisz Film Research Archives, Amsterdam and Alfred Wolfsohn Voice Research Centre Archives. Curated by Paul Newham, London.

Croner, A., interviewed by Mary Löwenthal Felstiner, 30 March 1984. Repository: Franz Weisz Film Research Archives, Amsterdam and Alfred Wolfsohn Voice Research Centre Archives. Curated by Paul Newham, London.

Davy, J., 'Creak to Squeal', Observer (newspaper), 4 March 1956. Repository: Alfred Wolfsohn Voice Research Centre Archives. Curated by Leslie Shepard, Dublin, Ireland.

Downes, E., letter to Alfred Wolfsohn, 1958. Repository: Roy Hart Theatre Archives, Malérargues, France.

Film: Charlotte, written by Judith Herzberg, directed by Franz Weisz. Released by Elsevier Select Video, Amsterdam, 1981.

Film: Footage and accompanying sound-track showing Wolfsohn teaching, produced by Leslie Shepard in London 1955. Repository: Alfred Wolfsohn Voice Research Centre Archives. Curated by Leslie Shepard, Dublin, Ireland.

Film: In Town Tonight: Alfred Wolfsohn at Golders Green (television documentary), hosted by Fife Robertson, made and broadcast by the BBC in the mid 1950s. Repository: Alfred Wolfsohn Voice Research Centre Archives. Curated by Leslie Shepard, Dublin, Ireland.

Freeden, H., 'A Jewish Theatre under the Swastika'. LBI Yearbook 1 (1956).

Freud, S., The Standard Edition of the Complete Psychological Works of Sigmund Freud, ed. James Strachey in collaboration with Anna Freud, assisted by Alix Strachey and Alan Tyson, vols. 2 and 3. London: Hogarth Press and the Institute of Psychoanalysis, 1953–74.

Garde, E., Folia Phoniatrica, 3: pp. 248–253. 1951.

Gerne, M., Problemlösung im Traum am Beispiel der Trauerverarbeitung. Zurich, 1987. Doctoral Thesis. University of Zurich 1987.

Günther, M., 'The Human Voice: On Alfred Wolfsohn'. Spring: A Journal of Archetype and Culture 50. 1990 pp. 65–75.

Günther, M., The Human Voice, Paper read at the National Conference on Drama Therapy, Antioch University, San Francisco, November 1986. Repository: Roy Hart Theatre Archives, Malérargues, France.

Günther, M., interviewed by David Williams, Malérargues, France, February 1985. Repository: Dartington College of Arts Theatre Papers Archives, Devon.

Hamsun, K., Mysteries. (1892)

Hart, R., Context. Paper read at the Third International Congress of Psychodrama, Vienna, 1968. Repository: Roy Hart Theatre Archives, Malérargues, France.

Hart, R., Lecture read at the Jung Institute in London, 1963. Repository: Roy Hart Theatre Archives, Malérargues, France.

Hart, R., et al., 'An Outline of the Work of the Alfred Wolfsohn Voice Research Centre', subsequently published in 'The Roy Hart Theatre: Documentation and Interviews', Dartington Theatre Papers, ed. David Williams, Fifth Series, No. 14, pp. 2–7. Series ed. Peter Hulton. Dartington College of Arts, 1985.

Hart, R., et al., performing 'Spoon River'. Phonograph recordings, 1957–1960. Repository: Alfred Wolfsohn Voice Research Centre Archives. Curated by Leslie Shepard, Dublin, Ireland.

Hart, R., How Voice Gave me a Conscience. Paper read at the Seventh International Congress for Psychotherapy, Wiesbaden, 1967. Repository: Roy Hart Theatre Archives, Malérargues, France.

Hart, R., performing 'Carnivorous Crark' under the direction of and conducted by Alfred Wolfsohn. Phonograph recordings, 1957–1960. Repository: Alfred Wolfsohn Voice Research Centre Archives. Curated by Leslie Shepard, Dublin, Ireland.

Hart, R., performing 'Rhapsody on a Windy Night' by T. S. Eliot under the direction of and conducted by Alfred Wolfsohn. Phonograph recordings, 1957–1960. Repository: Alfred Wolfsohn Voice Research Centre Archives. Curated by Leslie Shepard, Dublin, Ireland.

Hart, R., performing 'The Hollow Men' by T. S. Eliot under the direction of and conducted by Alfred Wolfsohn. Phonograph recordings, 1957–1960. Repository: Alfred Wolfsohn Voice Research Centre Archives. Curated by Leslie Shepard, Dublin, Ireland.

Hart, R., performing 'The Rocks' by T. S. Eliot under the direction of and conducted by Alfred Wolfsohn. Phonograph recordings, 1957–1960. Repository: Alfred Wolfsohn Voice Research Centre Archives. Curated by Leslie Shepard, Dublin, Ireland.

Hickey, W., 'William Hickey and the Voice of the Year', Daily Express (newspaper), 28 February 1956. Repository: Alfred Wolfsohn Voice Research Centre Archives. Curated by Paul Newham, London.

Huxley, A., letter to Alfred Wolfsohn. 5 December 1958. Repository: Alfred Wolfsohn Voice Research Centre Archives. Curated by Leslie Shepard, Dublin, Ireland.

Wolfsohn, A., Letters to Aldous Huxley. April – July 1958. Repository: Alfred Wolfsohn Voice Research Centre Archives. Curated by Leslie Shepard, Dublin, Ireland.

Huxley, J., letter to Alfred Wolfsohn, 14 November 1958. Repository: Alfred Wolfsohn Voice Research Centre Archives. Curated by Leslie Shepard, Dublin, Ireland.

Jacobs, A., 'Mr. Hoffnung Starts a New Musical Fashion', Evening Standard (newspaper),14 November 1956. Repository: Alfred Wolfsohn Voice Research Centre Archives. Curated by Paul Newham, London.

Jaffe, A., letter to Alfred Wolfsohn, 3 May 1955. Repository: Roy Hart Theatre Archives, Malérargues, France.

Joachim, H, (newspaper), Die Welt, 20 October 1969. Repository: Alfred Wolfsohn Voice Research Centre Archives. Curated by Paul Newham, London.

Johnson, J. singing 'Nightingale', conducted by Alfred Wolfsohn. Phonograph recordings, 1957–1960. Repository: Alfred Wolfsohn Voice Research Centre Archives. Curated by Leslie Shepard, Dublin, Ireland.

Johnson, J. singing 'Pagliacci' by Ruggiero Leoncavallo, conducted by Alfred Wolfsohn. Phonograph recordings, 1957–1960. Repository: Alfred Wolfsohn Voice Research Centre Archives. Curated by Leslie Shepard, Dublin, Ireland.

Johnson, J. singing 'The Lift Girl', music by Donald Swan, lyrics by John Betjeman. Recorded at the Hoffnung Music Festival. Phonograph recordings, 1957–1960. Repository: Alfred Wolfsohn Voice Research Centre Archives. Curated by Leslie Shepard, Dublin, Ireland.

Jones, J., The Letters of Leopold Mozart (Manuscript). 1924. Repository: Alfred Wolfsohn Voice Research Centre Archives. Curated by Leslie Shepard, Dublin, Ireland.

Jung, C.G., The Collected Works, ed. H. Read, M. Fordham, G. Adler and W. McGuire, vol. 9. Princeton, New Jersey: Princeton University Press, and London: Routledge and Kegan Paul, 1953.

Kelsey, F., 'Letters to the Editor: The New Voice', Observer (newspaper), 11 March 1956. Alfred Wolfsohn Voice Research Centre Archives. Curated by Paul Newham, London.

Kretzmer, H., 'Stunning – this Trip with the Human Voice', Daily Express (newspaper), Cited in 'Roy Hart Theatre', unpublished anthology of reviews, extracts from articles and other material, compiled by Barrie Coghlan with assistance from Noah Pikes in 1979. Repository: Roy Hart Theatre Archives, Malérargues, France.

Landry, I., Letter to Paul Newham, 29 October 1991. Repository: Alfred Wolfsohn Voice Research Centre Archives. Curated by Paul Newham, London.

Löwenthal Felstiner, M., To Paint her Life: Charlotte Salomon in the Nazi Mirror. New York: Harper Collins, 1994.

Luchsinger, R. and Dubois, C.L., 'Phonetische und stroboskopische Untersüchungen an einem Stimmphänomen', Folia Phoniatrica, 8: No. 4, pp. 201–210. Trans. Ian Halcrow. 1956.

Mayer, L., interviewed by David Williams, Malérargues, France, February 1985. Repository: Dartington College of Arts Theatre Papers Archives, Devon.

Moore, B., interviewed by Peter Hulton, Paris, January 1985. Repository: Dartington College of Arts Theatre Papers Archives, Devon.

Moses, P.J., 'Speech and Voice Therapy in Otolaryngology', Eye, Ear, Nose & Throat Monthly, 32: No. 7, pp. 367–375. July 1953.

Moses, P.J., The Voice of Neurosis. New York: Grune & Stratton, 1954.

Moses, P.J., 'Reorientation of Concepts and Facts in Phonetics', Logos, pp. 45–51. 1958.

Moses, P.J., Letter to Alfred Wolfsohn, 16 April 1961. Repository: Roy Hart Theatre Archives, Malérargues, France. Copyright Marita Günther.

Newham, P., The Singing Cure: An Introduction to Voice Movement Therapy. London Random House, 1993 and Boston Shambhala, 1994.

Owen, E.H., 'Letters to the Editor: Song and Strain', (newspaper), Observer, 18 March 1956. Repository: Alfred Wolfsohn Voice Research Centre Archives. Curated by Paul Newham, London.

Roose-Evans J., Experimental Theatre: From Stanislavski to Peter Brook, 4th edn. London: Routledge, 1989.

Salamon, E., interviewed by Paul Newham, London, 1990. Repository: Alfred Wolfsohn Voice Research Centre Archives. Curated by Paul Newham, London.

Salomon, C., A Diary in Pictures, ed. A.J. Peterson with introductions by Paul Tillich and Emil Strauss. First published in Tokyo: Zokeisha, 1963, then London: Collins, 1963.

Salomon, C., Charlotte: Life or Theatre, ed. U.G. Schwartz with a preface by Judith C. E. Belinfante and an introduction by Judith Herzberg. London: Allen Lane, Penguin, 1981.

Salomon-Lindberg, P., interviewed by Mary Löwenthal Felstiner, Amsterdam, 23–26 March 1984; 15–20 April 1985; 6–8 July 1988; 14 July 1993. Trans. Franz Weisz. Repository: Franz Weisz Film Research Archives, Amsterdam and Alfred Wolfsohn Voice Research Centre Archives. Curated by Paul Newham, London.

Salomon-Lindberg, P., interviewed by Franz Weisz, Amsterdam, 1981. Trans. Franz Weisz. Repository: Franz Weisz Film Research Archives, Amsterdam and Alfred Wolfsohn Voice Research Centre Archives. Curated by Paul Newham, London.

Salomon-Lindberg, P., interviewed by Paul Newham, Amsterdam, August 1991. Repository: Alfred Wolfsohn Voice Research Centre Archives. Curated by Paul Newham, London.

Schwarz, B., 'The Music World in Migration', The Muses Flee Hitler: Cultural Transfer and Adaptation 1930–1945, ed. Jarrell C. Jackman and Carla M. Borden.Washington, D.C.: Smithsonian Institution, 1983.

Shepard, L., 'Letters to the Editor: Song and Strain', Observer (newspaper), 18 March 1956. Alfred Wolfsohn Voice Research Centre Archives. Curated by Paul Newham, London.

Shepard, L., 'The Voice of the World', (printed notes to accompany recording, with introduction by Dr Henry Cowell), Vox Humana: Alfred Wolfsohn's Experiments in Extension of Human Vocal Range. New York: Folkways Records and Service Corp., Album No. FPX 123, 1956.

Shepard, L., An Empirical Therapy Based on an Extension of Vocal Range and Expression in Singing and Drama. Paper read at the Sixth International Congress of Psychotherapy, London, August 1964. Repository: Alfred Wolfsohn Voice Research Centre Archives. Curated by Leslie Shepard, Dublin, Ireland.

Shepard, L., interviewed by Paul Newham, Dublin, 1990. Repository: Alfred Wolfsohn Voice Research Centre Archives. Curated by Paul Newham, London.

Singer, K., statements made in 1934 latterly recorded by Herbert Freeden (1956). Curated by Paul Newham, London.

Student: (anonymous by request) in interview with Paul Newham, 1993/94. Repository: Alfred Wolfsohn Voice Research Centre Archives. Curated by Paul Newham, London.

Stevens, A., On Jung. London and New York: Routledge, 1990.

Various, Roy Hart Theatre. Anthology of reviews, extracts from articles and other material, compiled by Barrie Coghlan with assistance from Noah Pikes), 1979. Repository: Roy Hart Theatre Archives, Malérargues, France.

Various, Phonograph recordings, 1957–1960. Repository: Alfred Wolfsohn Voice Research Centre Archives. Curated by Leslie Shepard, Dublin, Ireland.

Various, Synopsis of Alfred Wolfsohn's Work on the Human Voice. Manuscript containing excerpts from articles and correspondence, compiled and printed by attendants of the Alfred Wolfsohn Voice Research Centre in 1963. Repository: Alfred Wolfsohn Voice Research Centre Archives. Curated by Leslie Shepard, Dublin, Ireland.

von Einsiedel, W., Six Instead of Two and a Half Octaves: Unlimited Range – About an Experiment and its Possible Consequences. Manuscript for BBC Radio broadcast on 19 November 1957. Repository: Alfred Wolfsohn Voice Research Centre Archives. Curated by Paul Newham, London.

Warrack, J., 'Joke Fantasy of Hoffnung Concert: Hosepipe Concerto', Daily Telegraph (newspaper), 14 November 1956. Repository: Alfred Wolfsohn Voice Research Centre Archives. Curated by Paul Newham, London.

Waterhouse, J.F., The Utopian Voice in Birmingham: Alfred Wolfsohn's Demonstration', Birmingham Post (newspaper), 17 October 1955. Repository: Alfred Wolfsohn Voice Research Centre Archives. Curated by Paul Newham, London.

Waterhouse, J.F., 'Night-Queen Sings Sarastro', Birmingham Post (newspaper), 17 October 1955. Repository: Alfred Wolfsohn Voice Research Centre Archives. Curated by Paul Newham, London.

Weiser, E., 'Stimme Ohne Fessel', Die Weltwoche (newspaper), 30 September 1955. Trans. Ian Halcrow. Repository: Alfred Wolfsohn Voice Research Centre Archives. Curated by Paul Newham, London.

Wolfsohn, A, 'Notes on Orpheus'. London, 1949 (Manuscript). In Spring: A Journal of Archetype and Culture 50. 1990 pp. 76–79.

Wolfsohn, A., Die Brücke. London 1947 (Manuscript). Trans. Marita Günther and Sheila Braggins. Repository: Joods Historisch Museum, Amsterdam.

Wolfsohn, A., Letters to Aldous Huxley. October – December 1958. Repository: Alfred Wolfsohn Voice Research Centre Archives. Curated by Leslie Shepard, Dublin, Ireland.

Wolfsohn, A., Orpheus, oder der Weg zu einer Maske. Germany 1936–1938 (Manuscript). Trans. Marita Günther. Repository: Joods Historisch Museum, Amsterdam.

Wolfsohn, A., The Biography of an Idea. London 1943–1960. (Manuscript). Trans. Marita Günther. Repository: Roy Hart Theatre Archives, Malérargues, France.

Wolfsohn, A., The Problem of Limitations. London 1958 (Manuscript). Trans. Kaya Anderson. Repository: Roy Hart Theatre Archives, Malérargues, France.

Young, W., 'A New Kind of Voice', Observer (newspaper), 26 February 1956. Repository: Alfred Wolfsohn Voice Research Centre Archives. Curated by Paul Newham, London.
