= Alfred Wolfsohn Voice Research Centre =

UK-based research project

The Alfred Wolfsohn Voice Research Centre was a project established to investigate the therapeutic and artistic potential of vocal expression. The Centre was founded by Alfred Wolfsohn in Berlin during 1935 and re-situated in London during 1943, where he and his contemporaries and successors developed principles and practices that provided the foundations for the use of an extended vocal technique. This technique allows vocalists to extend their vocal range and flexibility beyond that usually heard in speech or song.

The Centre inspired, precipitated, and influenced a number of developments within the arts, the expressive therapies, and psychotherapy, including the Roy Hart Theatre, founded by Roy Hart, the psychotherapeutic approach to song, prayer, and guided meditation evolved by Paul Newham, the clinical application of singing and nonverbal vocalization in music therapy and drama therapy, and the use of spontaneous vocal expression in dance movement therapy.

In addition, the extended vocal technique developed at the Centre has been used by performers in avant garde theatre, experimental music, and postmodern dance including: Eight Songs for a Mad King composed by Peter Maxwell Davies and performed by Roy Hart, Akropolis (1962) directed by Jerzy Grotowski, Orghast (1971) directed by Peter Brook, and House of Bones (1991) by Motionhouse with vocal music composed and performed using extended vocal technique by Paul Newham.

== Phases ==
The Alfred Wolfsohn Voice Research Centre can be divided into six phases, each one characterized by a distinct locus of attention, but all of them emergent from a shared commitment to a common ground. This common ground comprised two elements. Firstly, a commitment to the principles of Analytical Psychology, established by Carl Jung, with particular attention to Active Imagination technique. Secondly, an intention to establish a form of extended vocal technique that would enable vocalists to develop a highly flexible vocal range capable of expressing a broad spectrum of emotions and characters, for both therapeutic and artistic application.

=== Phase 1: 1935–1939 ===
The first phase of the Centre spans from 1935 t 1939 in Berlin.

In 1914, Alfred Wolfsohn was conscripted to military service, and after discharge became disturbed by auditory hallucinations of vocal sounds that he had heard wounded and dying soldiers make. He was subsequently diagnosed with Shell Shock, and after failing to benefit from psychiatry, hypnosis, and medication, cured himself by vocalizing the extreme sounds he had heard and hallucinated.

In 1935, Wolfsohn met the opera singer Paula Salomon-Lindberg, who offered him lodging and a job teaching singing to those she described as her less gifted pupils. During this time, Wolfsohn began to develop an approach to vocal pedagogy that his pupils reported to be therapeutic. This phase was characterized by Wolfsohn's experiments, conducted with two student groups. The first comprised those who came for lessons initially intending to improve their professional singing proficiency, but who became increasingly motivated to attend because of the therapeutic benefits they experienced. The second group were those who came originally and entirely for therapeutic purposes, without any intention to sing publicly.

Paula Salomon-Lindberg did not believe that Wolfsohn's techniques were suitable for training professional singers, and criticized his approach. However, she acknowledged that his pupils appeared to find his lessons effective in helping them overcome inhibitions and experience an emotional release that Wolfsohn described as cathartic.

During this phase Wolfsohn made notes about his experiences during the war, his views about the capacity of the human voice to extend beyond the range commonly heard in speech and song, and the impact of his lessons upon those he taught. These notes evolved in a manuscript called 'Orpheus, oder der Weg zu einer Maske'.

During the early part of this phase Wolfsohn believed that Sigmund Freud's notion of catharsis was the most appropriate framework within which to situate and by which to explain the therapeutic effects of his teaching. During the second part of this phase, Wolfsohn began to discover the theories of Carl Jung, as he simultaneously grew more confident in his own vocal teaching. Consequently, Wolfsohn began to focus less on facilitating in his students an emotional release or catharsis through the voice, and more on helping them give vocal expression to mental imagery, including the characters and animals that they reported encountering in their dreams.

This pivotal point in the development of the Centre was terminated by the rise of Nazi Germany.

=== Phase 2: 1943–1956 ===
The second phase of the Centre spans from 1943–1956 in London.

In 1939, Wolfsohn escaped Nazi Germany, and re-established his Centre in London during 1943, after receiving permission from the British government to work as a singing teacher. Few of the pupils who attended the Centre during this phase had ambitions to sing professionally or publicly, and almost all of them attended and took singing lessons with Wolfsohn to experience therapeutic benefits. Among such students was Rabbi Lionel Blue whose personal reasons for attending the Centre are emblematic of those that motivated many other attendants:

I knew that there was a whole dimension of me that I had never had an opportunity to express: emotions or feelings, or maybe instincts. I also felt quite inhibited a lot of the time, though I was reasonably good at hiding my shyness. It was as though the 'full me' wanted to break out, and I knew this 'me' was never going to emerge through talking. So when I heard of his [Wolfsohn's] approach to singing, it immediately appealed to me, and though I only went for a short period of time, it helped enormously. It gave me confidence in other areas of my life.

Whilst some students, like Blue, attended for a short period, often for one singing lesson per week over several months, others spent entire days at the Centre, having singing lessons and observing others. These included Jenny Johnson, whose voice typified for Wolfsohn what he believed was possible for every human voice trained in his approach to extended vocal technique.

Under Wolfsohn's tuition, Jenny Johnson developed a vocal range of almost 6 octaves, as well as a flexibility of timbre that allowed her to give dramatic expression to many different characters, and to sing parts from operas written for soprano, tenor, baritone, and bass. It was during this phase that Wolfsohn re situated his teaching firmly in the principles established by Carl Jung, believing that he had discovered and developed a new component to the technique Jung called Active Imagination]

Carl Jung claimed that the terms psyche and imagination might reasonably be used interchangeably to refer to the same source of images, claiming that every mental process involves in some way an encounter with imagery. Jung described Active Imagination as the means by which mental images are expressed and become outwardly manifest, and pointed to paintings, fairytales, myths, and religious symbolism as examples.

The regular attendants of the Alfred Wolfsohn Research Centre believed that they had discovered the way in which their extended vocal technique and the resultant expressiveness of their voices could demonstrate Active Imagination through nonverbal vocal sound, giving outward acoustic expression to what Jung called 'psychic imagery'.

The Centre's attempts to communicate directly with Jung failed, and the approach to vocal expression demonstrated by its attendants attracted more attention from those interested in its potential use in experimental music and theatre than in psychotherapy.

=== Phase 3: 1956–1962 ===
The third phase of the Centre spans from 1956 to 1962 in London.

Phase 3 of the Alfred Wolfsohn Voice Research Centre was characterized by a concentration on exploring the artistic use of the founder's extended vocal technique, by rehearsing and presenting short demonstrations, including songs, poems, and improvised performance pieces to invited guests, including Yehudi Menuhin, Laurence Olivier, Peter Ustinov, Bertold Wiesner, Edward Downes, Hermann Scherche, Julian Huxley, and Aldous Huxley.

Intrigued by what they observed, these and other invited guests publicized the work of the Centre, and as a result, some attendants made a number of public appearances and recordings. These included Jenny Johnson's appearance at the Hoffnung Music Festival, and a gramophone record of all regular long-standing students, published by Smithsonian Folkways.

During the latter part of this phase, Roy Hart, a graduate of the Royal Academy of Dramatic Art who had started attending the Centre in 1947, began to give acting classes for actors and drama students at venues across London, appropriating and extending techniques that he had learned from Wolfsohn.

=== Phase 4: 1962–1974 ===
The fourth phase of the Centre spans from 1962 to 1974.

In 1962 Wolfsohn fell ill and died in hospital. Soon afterwards, Hart announced his intent to further both the therapeutic and artistic application of the extended vocal technique derived from Wolfsohn's original research.

The death of Wolfsohn precipitated a division among the attendants of the Centre which culminated in the permanent departure of some when Hart formed a theatre company during 1968–1969. He called it the Roy Hart Theatre, which comprised some actors and acting students from the classes he had been teaching around London and others who had been students of Wolfsohn at the Centre, including Marita Günther, to whom Wolfsohn bequeathed his manuscripts and personal effects.

Subsequently Hart, Günther, and others vacated the studio in which Wolfsohn had taught since establishing the Centre, and moved to new premises in Hampstead, taking their documentation of the Centre's work with them, where they rehearsed a number of pieces subsequently performed at theatres, including Eight Songs for a Mad King, especially written for Hart by Peter Maxwell Davies. Meanwhile, the remaining attendants who did not join Hart's theatre company, including Jenny Johnson, her sister Jill Johnson, Irene Landry, and Leslie Shepard, remained for a short time before dispersing, taking with them their photographic, phonographic, and written documentation of the work of the Alfred Wolfsohn Voice Research Centre.

=== Phase 5 – 1962–1985 ===
The fifth phase of the Centre spans from 1962–1985.

Between 1962 and 1992 the Alfred Wolfsohn Research Centre, which had hitherto been physically located at a single place, first in Berlin, and later London, became dispersed, as some of the original attendants of the London Centre, who had not joined Hart's theatre company, sought to collaborate, continuing and consolidating work begun by Alfred Wolfsohn. This posed a considerable challenge, as they were dispersed across the United States, Europe and the UK.

Among them was the archivist Leslie Shepard, who collected and curated many recordings, photographs, and written documentation produced by the dispersed Alfred Wolfsohn Voice Research Centre attendants at a private archive in Dublin, Ireland, while seeking funding to re-establish the Centre, and lease the archive materials to museums. Meanwhile, the documentation possessed by attendants of the Centre who were now part of the Roy Hart Theatre, was archived at Malérargues, in the South of France, when the Roy Hart Theatre moved there in 1974. At the same time, Marita Günther deposited some of Wolfsohn's writings and manuscripts that she had inherited with the Jewish Historical Museum in Amsterdam.

After Roy Hart died in a car accident in 1974 his company continued to teach voice classes and tour both experimental music pieces anddramatic productions that used an extended vocal range, developed by applying techniques established by Wolfsohn, and extended by Hart. Meanwhile, the remaining attendants of the Alfred Wolfsohn Research Centre toured museums, colleges, and universities, with demonstrations and archive documentation of Wolfsohn's life and work.

=== Phase 6: 1985–1999 ===
The sixth phase of the Centre spans from 1985 to 1999.

In 1985, Paul Newham, a graduate of Drama Centre, and Dartington College of Arts, took voice lessons with Enrique Pardo, a member of the Roy Hart Theatre who had never met Wolfsohn, but trained with Hart. Newham subsequently sought to adapt the techniques he learned from Pardo to promote the creativity and self-expression of nonverbal young adults with a range of disabilities]that prevented them from speaking but who nonetheless were able to make a range of vocal sounds. The following year, while working as director of Libre Theatre Company in Oxford, a drama troupe that includes disabled performers, Newham began locating attendants of the Centre, who had studied with Alfred Wolfsohn, including those who had dispersed after his death, and the ones now part of the Roy Hart Theatre.

The Roy Hart Theatre Company dissolved in 1989 when it was apparent that its members had established their own distinct and discreet work, most notably the experimental arts and cultural project Pan Theatre established by Enrique Pardo in 1981 with collaborative contributions from its honorary president James Hillman.

With the assistance of Leslie Shepard, Marita Günther, the Jewish Historical Museum, the British Academy, and the Ferens Institute Voice Clinic at the Middlesex Hospital, Newham researched a variety of extended vocal techniques, studied the aggregate archives of the Alfred Wolfsohn Voice Research Centre, including the founder's manuscripts, and re-establish it in Redchurch Street, East London. Newham subsequently extended the techniques pioneered at the Centre to formulate a therapeutic methodology drawing upon guided meditation and ideokinesis incorporating prayer as well as song, while contextualizing these developments in the tenets descendant from the Analytical Psychology established by Jung. Having been renamed the London Voice Centre by Paul Newham, it closed in 1999 when he left and some graduates of its programs established a US-based school with the aim of continuing his teachings.

=== Legacy and influence ===
The influence of the Alfred Wolfsohn Voice Research Centre remains evident across discreet disciplines as a result of the diverse ways in which its attendants have inherited and adapted the work initiated by its German founder in 1935. This evidence includes the clinical application of song as a therapeutic intervention with elderly populations by Sarah Povey; the vocal psychotherapy developed by Diane Austin; the training workshops in extended vocal technique taught by Noah Pikes; the appropriation of musical vocal expression as a medium of therapeutic communication in the expressive therapies; and the use of a variety of extended vocal techniques by many vocalists including Meredith Monk and Diamanda Galas.
