= Paul Moses =

Paul Moses may refer to:

- Paul B. Moses (1929–1966), American art historian and educator
- Paul J. Moses (1897–1965), American physician and academic
- Paul Moses Samson Naimanhye (born 1960), Ugandan bishop
