= Paula Salomon-Lindberg =

German alto singer (1897–2000)

Paula Lindberg
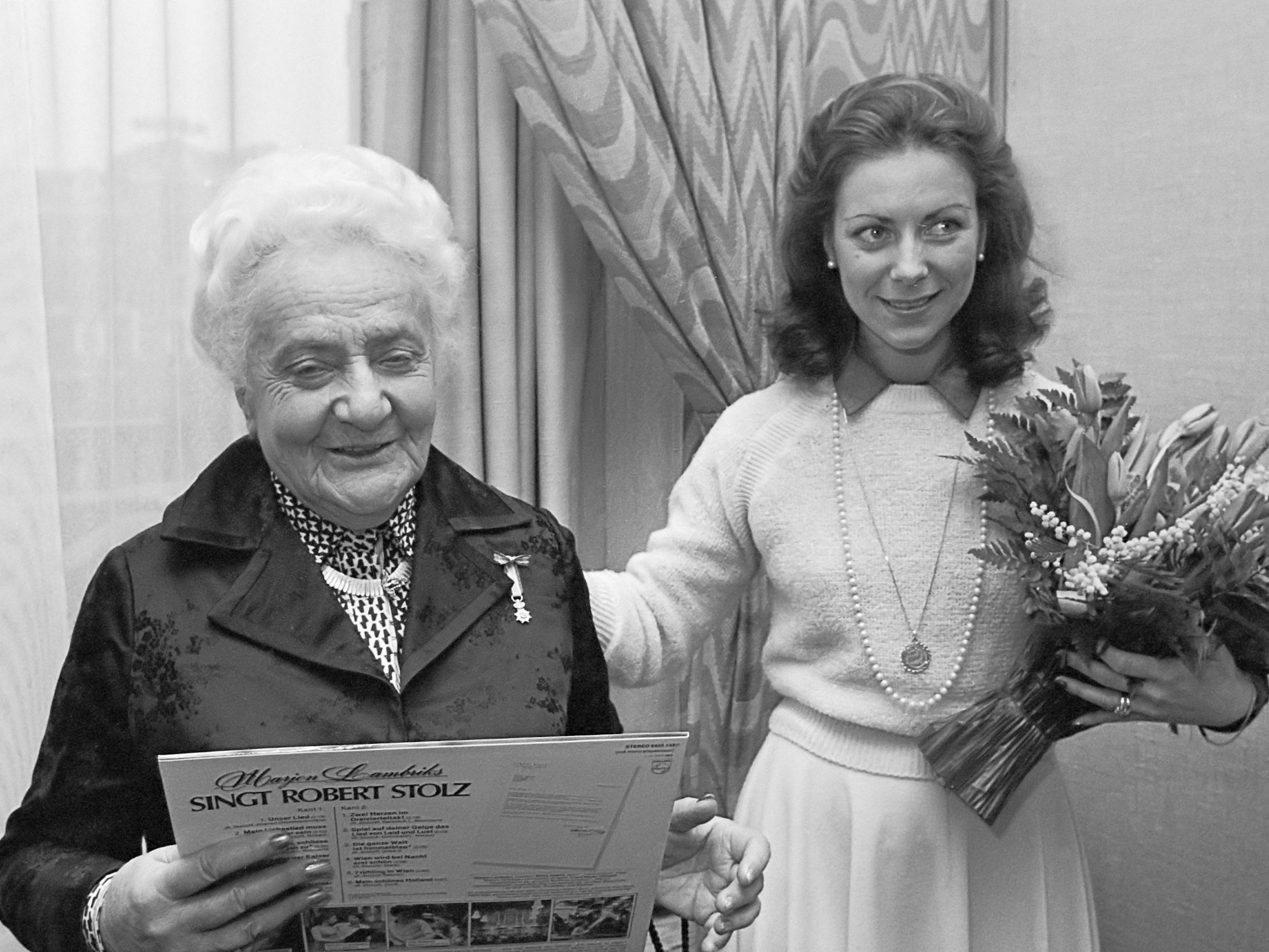
- Paula Lindberg (l) with her student Marjon Lambriks in 1980
- Born: Paula Levi; 21 December 1897; Frankenthal, Bavaria
- Died: 17 April 2000 (aged 102); Amsterdam, Netherlands
- Occupations: Contralto; Voice teacher

Paula Salomon-Lindberg (née Levi; 21 December 1897 – 17 April 2000) was an internationally renowned German classical contralto before the Second World War. She was specialised in Lied, oratorio and cantata, but occasionally also performed opera.

== Parents ==
Salomon-Lindberg's original name was Paula Levi. Her father was the Jewish Religionslehrer and hazzan Lazarus Levi, who had a special reputation as a singer, far beyond the town of Frankenthal. He was born on 16 July 1862 in Eckardroth and came to Frankenthal in 1896, which at that time belonged to Bavaria. On 9 March 1897, he married Sophia Mayer, who had been born in Frankenthal on 29 December 1872. His only child from the marriage was his daughter Paula. Lazarus Levi died on 17 November 1919, his wife on 26 November 1930, both in Frankenthal. The family graves are maintained in the new Jewish cemetery in Frankenthal.

== Life ==
Salomon-Lindberg received her education mainly in Mannheim and Berlin by Julius von Raatz-Brockmann. counterpoint she learned from Ernst Toch.

She became famous in the 1920s and appeared mainly in works of the Baroque period such as J. S. Bach's St Matthew Passion, Handel's Messiah, but also in more modern works such as Gustav Mahler's Das Lied von der Erde. In 1929, she gave a guest performance at the Grand Théâtre de Genève. Between 1930 and 1933, she sang the alto parts in performances of Bach Cantatas in the St. Thomas Church, Leipzig.

On 4 September 1930, she married the surgeon Albert Salomon in Frankenthal (1883-1976), became stepmother of the painter Charlotte Salomon and from then on appeared under the name Lindberg-Salomon instead of Paula Lindberg. She was friends with numerous personalities such as Siegfried Ochs, Kurt Singer, Erich Mendelsohn, Alfred Einstein, Paul and Rudolf Hindemith and Albert Schweitzer, and her house became a frequent meeting place for musical and social evenings. The rooms were equipped with a small art collection that was established from about 1928 to 1935, among others with works by Theodoor van Loon, Gustav Schönleber and Ambrosius Bosschaert.

After being banned by the Nazi government from performing in public in 1933, she sang until 1937 for the Kulturbund Deutscher Juden which she helped to build up under the direction of Kurt Singer. Among others she performed here with the pianist Grete Sultan. From 1935, she took lessons with the singing teacher Alfred Wolfsohn. Through determined behaviour and many administrative steps, she was able to obtain the release of her husband from Sachsenhausen concentration camp, where he had been imprisoned following the 1938 Kristallnacht. In the Künstlerhilfe she supported other people in danger and was able to help many of them to emigrate. In 1939, she fled with her husband to Amsterdam, where they were both interned in the Westerbork transit camp in 1943, but later escaped and survived the occupation in hiding until 1944.

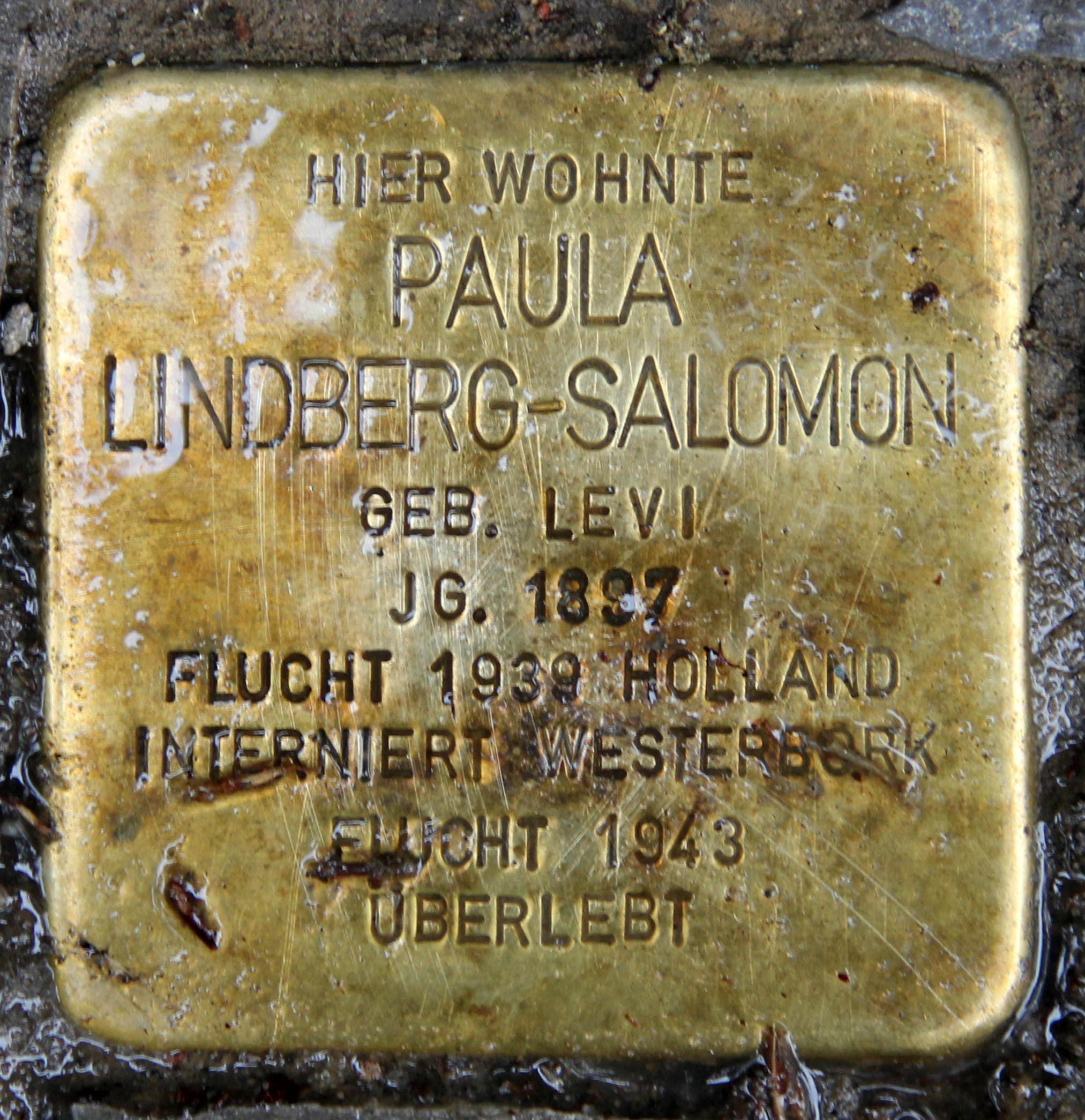
Stolperstein, Wielandstraße 15, in Berlin-Charlottenburg

After the war, Lindberg-Salomon lived in the Netherlands, was able to fit into Dutch concert life without any problems and worked as a singing teacher at the Amsterdam Music Lyceum and at the summer courses of the Mozarteum in Salzburg. In 1947, she travelled with her husband to Southern France, where they were presented with the pictures of Charlotte, which the couple donated to the Joods Historisch Museum in Amsterdam in 1971. She visited Germany in 1986 on the occasion of an exhibition with works of her stepdaughter. In 1989, she founded an international song competition named after her, which since then has been held every two years by the Universität der Künste Berlin, and which she actively supervised until her death. She rejected a classification or assessment of people according to religious or national affiliation with the following words:

Today I no longer ask: Are you German, are you Jewish or Christian? Today I see in everyone the human being.

Salomon-Lindberg died in Amsterdam at the age of 102.

== Recognition ==
On 21 April 2012, a Stolperstein for Salomon-Lindberg was laid in front of her former residence, in Berlin-Charlottenburg, Wielandstraße 15.
