= Paul J. Moses =

American physician and academic (1897–1965)

Paul J. Moses (1 April 1897 – 7 June 1965) was a clinical professor in charge of the Speech and Voice Section, Division of Otolaryngology at the Stanford University School of Medicine, San Francisco, where he conducted research into the psychology of the human voice, seeking to show how personality traits, neuroses, and symptoms of mental disorders are evident in the vocal tone or pitch range, prosody, and timbre of a voice, independent of the speech content.

Moses was influenced by both Sigmund Freud, Carl Jung, and notable preceding and contemporary researchers into the psychology of voice, including Sándor Ferenczi, Edward Sapir, Hadley Cantril, Gordon Allport, and Ross Stagner. Moses believed that the human voice was capable of expressing the contents of the psyche acoustically, comparing such a possibility with the way the founders of Psychoanalysis and Analytical Psychology suggested that dreams provide a visual expression.

Moses cited the work of singing teacher Alfred Wolfsohn, who taught his students extended vocal technique, by which some of them acquired vocal ranges in excess of five octaves, as a practical demonstration of the theories he developed at Stanford University School of Medicine, regarding the relationship between voice and personality.

Moses had a notable influence upon the work of many contemporaneous and successive researchers, including psychoanalysts, psychologists, psychiatrists, and musicologists who sought to determine whether aspects of personality, emotional states, attitudes, and other measurable psychological information could be deduced from the expressiveness of the voice independent of the speech content or words uttered, including Morris Brody, Friedrich Brodnitz, Auguste Jellineck, Deso Weiss, and Gottfried Arnold.

Moses was instrumental in applying the principles of Psychoanalysis and Analytical Psychology to the treatment of voice disorders, promoting attention to the potential psychological causes of, or contribution to vocal dysfunction among clinicians, and precipitating the study of voice psychology within the broader discipline of voice therapy. Furthermore, through his recognition of the potential psychotherapeutic benefits of the extended vocal technique developed by Alfred Wolfsohn, he precipitated the development of approaches to psychotherapy that use songs, prayers, and other forms of vocal expression as the main medium through which the client communicates, including Voice Movement Therapy established by Paul Newham, and the Vocal Psychotherapy developed by Diane Austin.

== Criticism ==
Despite Moses' claim that he could deduce significant psychological information from the voice of a speaker without attention to the verbal component, his assertions rested primarily on a single experiment. Furthermore, a significant number of experiments conducted prior and afterwards concluded that listeners are not able to accurately deduce traits of personality from a speaker's voice.

Moses' key experiment was conducted under the auspices of the University of California Institute of Child Welfare. He analysed the personality of an adolescent boy whom he had never met, from a phonograph record of the boy's voice, without face-to-face contact. The boy had previously received an assessment by a psychiatrist that included a Rorschach test. Based on what Moses perceived in the patterns of rhythm, pitch, timbre and prosody of the boy's recorded voice, Moses gave an analysis of the personality of the boy which was found to agree on many points with the Rorschach test findings and the psychiatrist's own report.

Yet it was primarily this experiment alone, and anecdotal references to his own clinical work, upon which Moses based his belief that 'vocal dynamics truthfully reflect psychodynamics' and that 'each emotion has its vocal expression'. He further asserted that when an incongruence between the vocal and verbal message occurs 'the voice is more likely to reveal the truth about the personality' than the speech and that therefore, 'before attempting to analyse the voice, one must divorce it from the message it seeks to convey'. However, few other experiments of the hundreds conducted since Moses assessed the recorded voice of a boy have evidenced that listeners are able to accurately deduce information about the speaker from the voice alone.

== Selected publications ==
Moses, P. J. (1942). "The study of personality from records of the voice". Journal of Consulting Psychology. 6 (5): 257–261. doi:10.1037/h0055754.

Moses, P. J. (1953). "Speech and voice therapy in otolaryngology". Eye, Ear, Nose and Throat Monthly. 32 (7): 367–375. PMID 13060344.

Moses, P. J. (1958). "Reorientation of concepts and facts in phonetics". Logos. 1: 45–51.

Moses, P. J. (1954). The Voice of Neurosis. New York: Grune and Stratton.
