= Marjon Lambriks =

Dutch operatic soprano (born 1949)

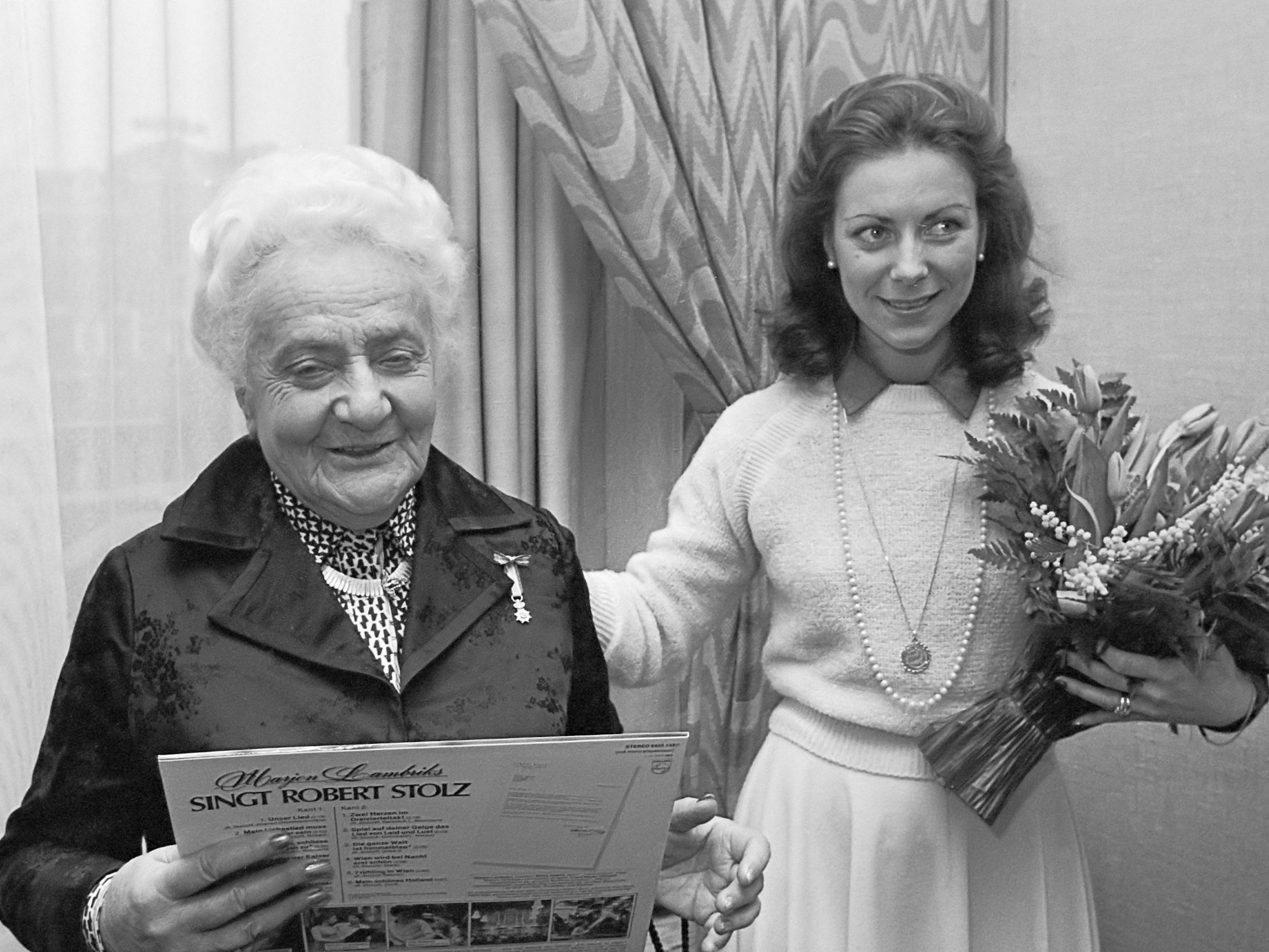
- Marjon Lambriks (r.) with her teacher Paula Lindberg in 1980
- Born: 5 April 1949 (age 76); Valkenburg aan de Geul, Netherlands
- Education: Maastricht Academy of Music; Mozarteum
- Occupation: Operatic soprano
- Organizations: Vienna Volksoper

Marjon Lambriks (born 5 April 1949) is a Dutch soprano who made an international career, especially in Austria. Her focus became operetta, whether performed on stage, for the radio, or in recordings. She recorded the role of Annina in Verdi's La traviata alongside Joan Sutherland and Luciano Pavarotti.

== Life ==
Born on 5 April 1949, in Valkenburg aan de Geul, Lambriks studied singing at the Maastricht Academy of Music and with Paula Lindberg in Amsterdam. She won a prize at a 1970 competition which enabled her to study further at the Mozarteum in Salzburg. In 1971, she won the grand prize of the city of Salzburg during the Salzburg Festival, which resulted in offers to play for major opera houses.

Lambriks signed with the Wiener Kammeroper and sang with it from 1971, including in Una cosa rara. From 1972, she was a member of the Vienna Volksoper, where she appeared as Hänsel in Humperdinck's Hänsel und Gretel, and in operettas, among others. In the 1974/75 season, she was also engaged at the Opernhaus Wuppertal. In 1977, she became the first singer of the Volksoper after the dismissal of Julia Migenes. She remained at the Volksoper until 1986, performing roles such as Niklausse in Offenbach's Hoffmanns Erzählungen, Cherubino in Mozart's Le nozze di Figaro and Nancy in Britten's Albert Herring. At the Vienna State Opera, she performed in several productions. She appeared at the Salzburg Festival in 1979 and 1980 as the Priestess in Verdi's Aida, and in 1980 also in a Mozart concert. She performed as a guest at the Bregenz Festival, in Klagenfurt, Antwerp and at the Opernhaus Zürich.

From 1976, she appeared predominantly in the Netherlands, performing as Zerlina in Mozart's Don Giovanni. She became more widely known in 1977 through television appearances in KRO's programs of Viennese songs, Wiener Melange. In 1979, she performed for the AVRO in a music programme specially designed for her, in which the music of various operetta composers in turn took centre stage: Franz Lehár, Robert Stolz and Johann Strauss. She also participated in concerts led by Willi Boskovsky, Ein Abend in Wien, in which she regularly sang in duet with Rudolf Schock. On German television, she became well known for her operetta performances, including a series with parodies. In 1987, she appeared in a Christmas show on television for the Dutch AVRO as well as a radio special for the NCRV. In 2009, a biography was written on her life and four-decade career. On 5 May 2010, she celebrated the end of her 40-year career as an opera and operetta singer with a performance at the liberation concert in Amsterdam.

== Recordings ==
Lambriks participated in recordings that Herbert von Karajan conducted: his version of Mozart's Figaro with the Vienna Philharmonic in 1978, and of Wagner's Parsifal in 1979/80 with the Berlin Philharmonic and Peter Hofmann in the title role. Richard Bonynge conducted a recording of Verdi's La traviata with Joan Sutherland and Luciano Pavarotti in the leading roles, and with Lambriks as Annina.

Her recordings also include:

- Strahlend junge Operette
- Marjon Lambriks zingt Robert Stolz (1979 / 1982)
- Operetten-Gala / Lieder der Puszta (1980)
- Marjon Lambriks / Meine schönsten Liebeslieder (1987)
- Marjon Lambriks & Henk Poort / Operetten-Gala (2001)
