= Parlato =

Parlato is an Italian surname. Notable people with the surname include:

- Carmine Parlato (born 1970), Italian footballer and manager
- Charlie Parlato (1919–2007), American trumpet musician
- Dennis Parlato (born 1947), American dancer, actor, and singer
- Frank Parlato Jr. (born 1955), American Publisher
- Giuseppe Parlato (1956–2025), Italian historian
- Gretchen Parlato (born 1976), American jazz singer
- Luca Parlato (born 1991), Italian rower
- Salvatore Parlato (born 1986), Italian basketball player
