= Leslie Shepard =

- Born: 21 June 1917; England
- Died: 20 August 2004 (age 87); Ireland
- Occupation: archivist

Leslie Alan Shepard (21 June 1917 – 20 August 2004) was a British author, archivist, and curator who wrote books on a range of subjects including street literature, early film, and the paranormal.

== Career ==
Shepard was instrumental in documenting the work of the Alfred Wolfsohn Voice Research Centre and collaborated with Paul Newham to formulate an extended vocal technique based on the analysis of speaking and singing voices from diverse cultures and oral traditions. Shepard also curated and either published or archived hundreds of documents and audio recordings including Irish ballad sheets and original examples of street literature, a subject on which he was considered an authority. In addition, Leslie Shepard was cited as an expert on the writings of Bram Stoker, Irish author of the 1897 Gothic horror novel Dracula. In collaboration with Albert Power, Shepard publicized and organized the Bram Stoker Society collecting, cataloging, and archiving numerous writings about both Stoker and the mythical Vampire, which the novelist used as the basis for the title character and antagonist 'Count Dracula' in his novel.

== Selected publications ==
- Shepard, L. The Broadside Ballad: A Study in Origins and Meaning. London H Jenkins Publishers 1962.
- Shepard, L. The History of the Horn: A Bibliographical Essay. Rampant Lions Press 1977.
- Shepard, L. Dracula Book of Great Horror Stories. Random House Value Publishing, 1990.
- Shepard, L. The History of Street Literature. David and Charles, 1973.
- Shepard, L. Seascape: A Pattern of Sounds for Reading Aloud. Offcut Press, 1971.
- Shepard, L. (Ed), Encyclopedia of Occultism and Psychical Research. Gale Research Company, 1979.
- Shepard, L. (Ed), Encyclopedia of Occultism and Parapsychology: The World of Paranormal Phenomena. Baker Publishing Group, 1992.
- Shepard, L. The News in Verse: Dreadful Crimes: A Set of Six Nineteenth-century Broadside Ballads of Appalling Murders and Other Wretched Crimes. Printed in Faithful Facsimile. Then Limited, 1972.
