= Eight Songs for a Mad King =

Opera

- Monodrama by Peter Maxwell Davies
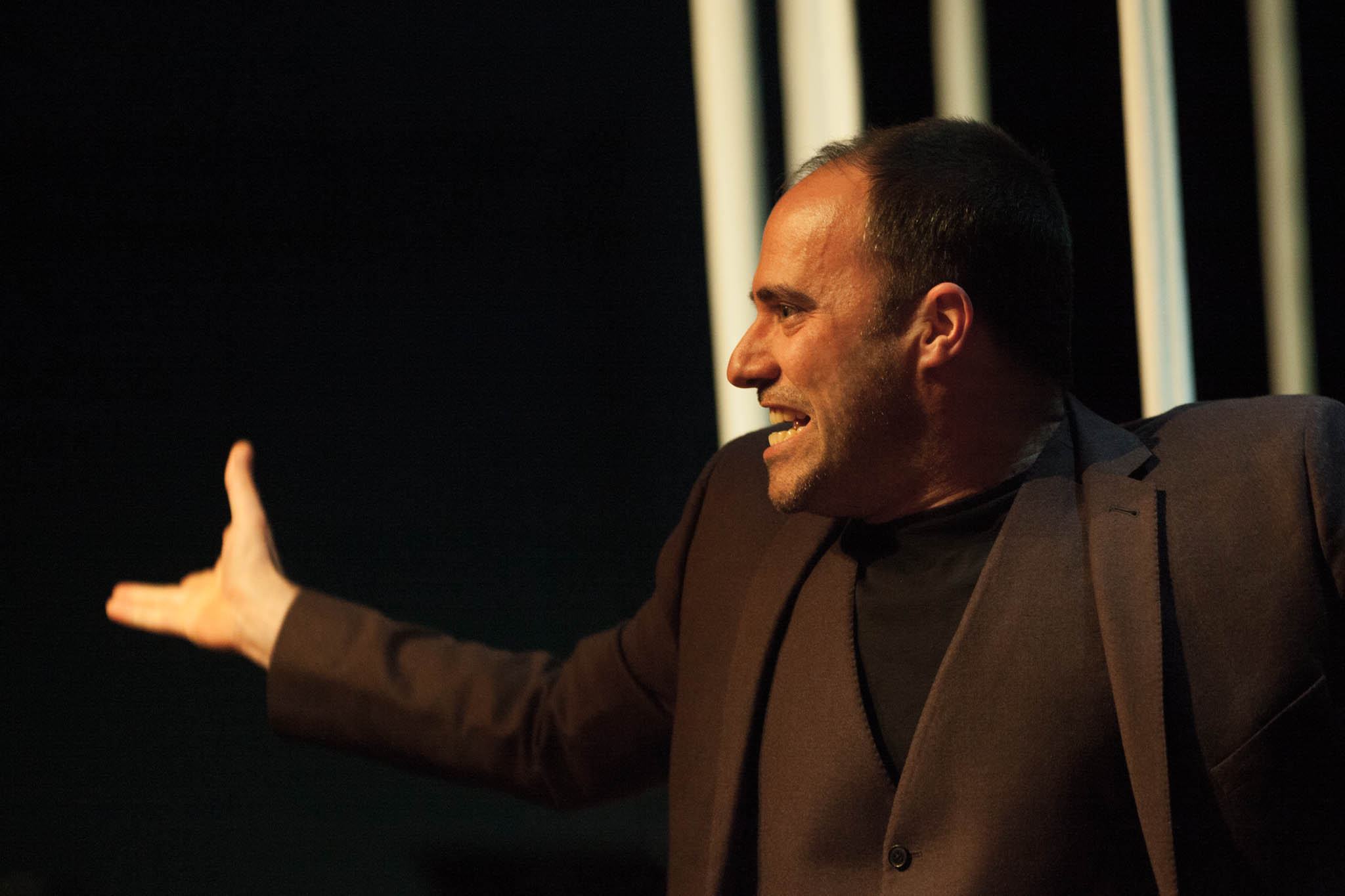
- Leigh Melrose performing the work at the Nordland Music Festival in Bodø, 2014
- Librettist: Randolph Stow
- Based on: words by George III
- Premiere: 22 April 1969; London

Eight Songs for a Mad King is a monodrama by Sir Peter Maxwell Davies with a libretto by Randolph Stow, based on words of George III. The work was written for the South-African actor Roy Hart and the composer's ensemble, the Pierrot Players. It was premiered on 22 April 1969.

Lasting half an hour, it is scored for a baritone with an extraordinary command of extended vocal techniques covering more than five octaves, and six players (Pierrot ensemble + percussion):

- flute (doubling piccolo)
- clarinet
- percussion (1 player): railway whistle, snare drum, 2 suspended cymbals, foot cymbal, 2 wood blocks, 2 bass drums, chains, ratchet, tom-toms, tamtam, tambourine, rototoms, toy bird-calls, 2 temple blocks, wind chimes, crotales, sleigh bells, dulcimer, glockenspiel, steel bars, crow, didgeridoo, washboard
- piano (doubling harpsichord)
- violin
- cello

Extended techniques are also required by the instrumentalists: for example there is frequent use of flutter-tonguing and multiphonics for the wind instruments and the pianist is required to play inside the piano with a plectrum. In the third song all the instrumentalists except the flautist play bird-calls and mechanical bird noises. Although most of the techniques are notated quite specifically, there are passages of guided improvisation, most obviously in the wind instruments at the end of the 5th song, when they are instructed to "use given pitches as centres around which groups — small, slow phrases, are built."

Like its predecessor, Pierrot lunaire, different movements make use of different combinations from the ensemble. The full ensemble is used in the first, third, fifth, and seventh songs as well as the first transition. The second song omits the wind instruments; the fourth song omits the wind instruments, violin, and piano; the sixth song omits the flute (with the exception of the first, very short, chord); the second transition omits the baritone; the eighth song omits the violinist (as the instrument has been smashed by this point).

The piece moves through a variety of different rhythmic characters. Some passages, such as the second transition, are strictly pulsed with a relatively clear metre (although extensive use of cross-rhythm), others use overlapping tempi (e.g. in the first and fifth songs), and there is also extensive use of recitative, most obviously in the cello-baritone duet of the fourth song.

The piece is generally written in a modernist idiom, although it makes frequent use of pastiche, allusion, and direct quotation. The eight songs are as follows:

1. The Sentry (King Prussia's Minuet)
2. The Country Walk (La Promenade)
3. The Lady-In-Waiting (Miss Musgrave's Fancy) Transition
4. To Be Sung on the Water (The Waterman)
5. The Phantom Queen (He's Ay A-Kissing Me) Transition
6. The Counterfeit (Le Conterfaite)
7. Country Dance (Scotch Bonnett)
8. The Review (A Spanish March)

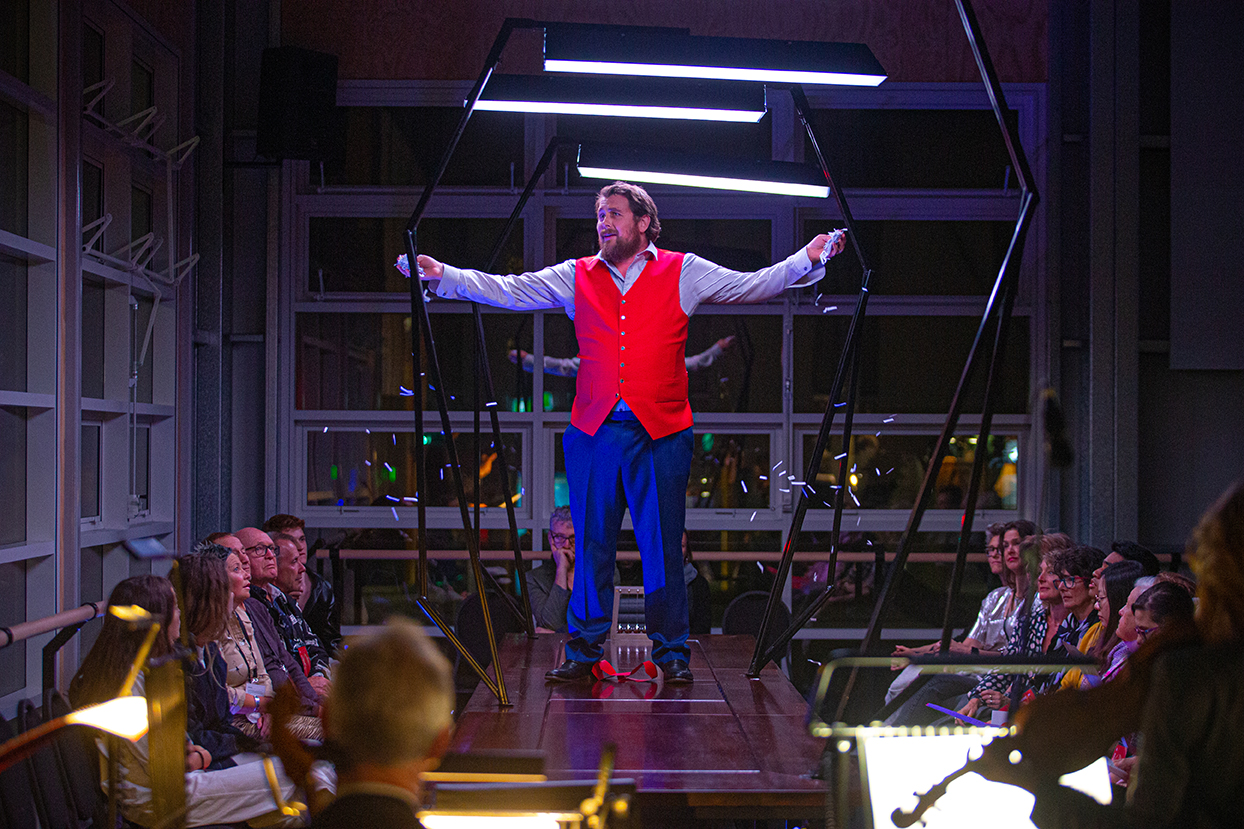
Robert Tucker in a 2020 New Zealand Opera production

The action unfolds as a soliloquy by the king, the players being placed on stage (traditionally) in large birdcages, and climaxes in his snatching and smashing the violin.

The score is published by Boosey & Hawkes, and its cover shows a famous excerpt from the score, the third movement, in which the staves are arranged like the bars of a birdcage.

Reflecting on the subject matter, Pauliina Rahiala wrote in the Turun Sanomat, "The piece prompts reflection on what constitutes an ethical way, in our time, to depict the stories of people suffering from serious and harmful illnesses in art—especially in terms of the tone of the portrayal: whether it reinforces stereotypes superficially or genuinely puts itself in the position of the individual, thereby increasing understanding."

Besides Hart, exponents of this work have included William Pearson, Michael Rippon, Thomas Meglioranza, Julius Eastman and Vincent Ranallo. The Dutch baritone Lieuwe Visser performed the piece numerous times: in 1977 with the Brabants Orkest, in 1978 with Reinbert de Leeuw and the Schönberg Ensemble. In 1987 it was the soundtrack for a ballet by Australian choreographer Jonathan Taylor, performed by the Dutch National Ballet. The last time Visser performed the piece was on the 9th of September 1999, at the Gergyev Festival in Rotterdam. The Swedish baritone Olle Persson performed the work in Stockholm in the 1990s. The British baritone Richard Suart has performed the piece in Gelsenkirchen‚ Milan‚ Helsinki‚ Strasbourg‚ Stavanger and Paris; in 1987 The Musical Times described Suart's take as "compelling from start to finish". Welsh baritone Kelvin Thomas sang the role at Munich's Kammerspiele Schauspielhaus in 2011, in a 2012 performance with Psappha, available to watch online, and in a production by Music Theatre Wales in 2013.

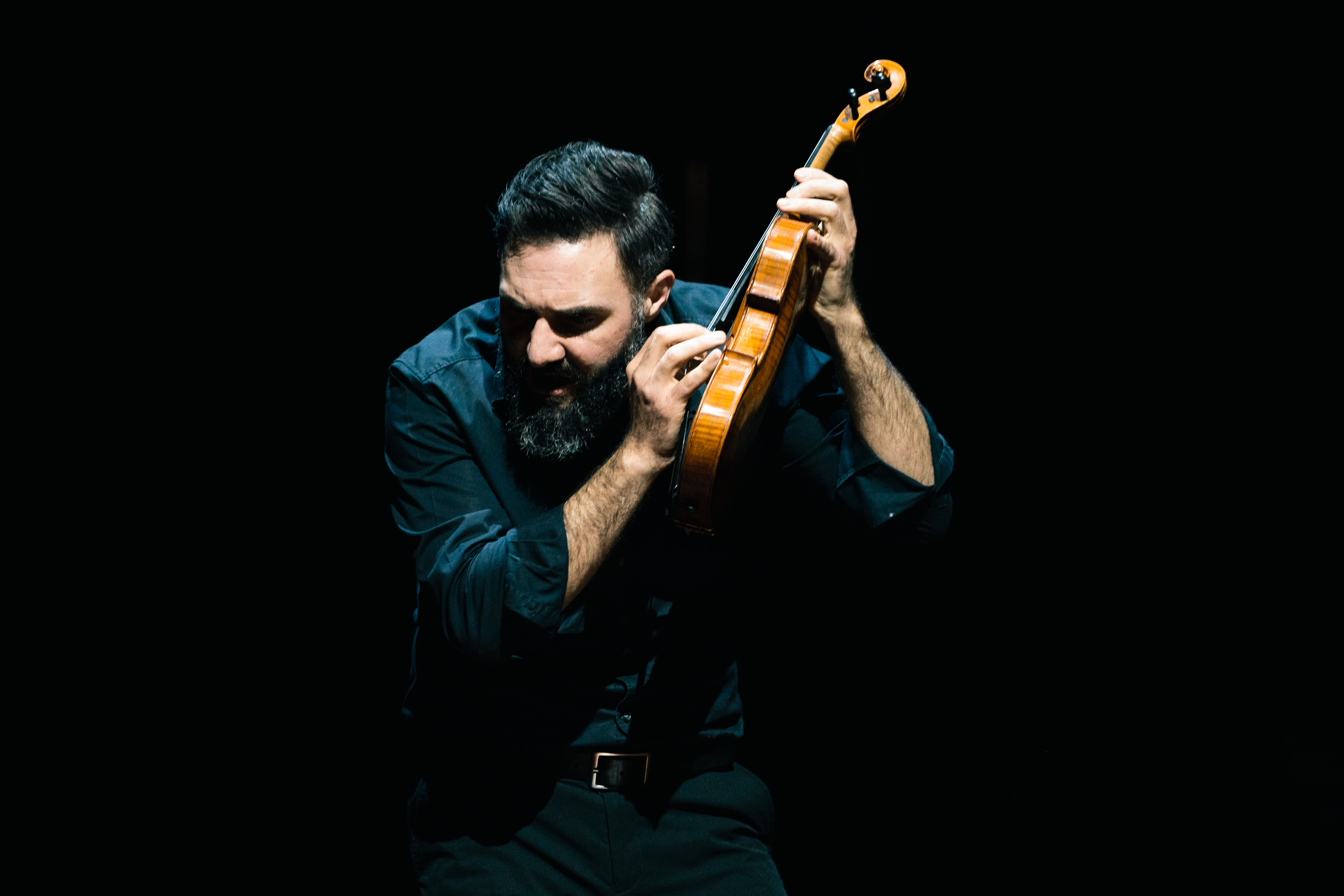
Thomas Florio performing the work with the Oslo Philharmonic in Oslo, 2023

American baritone Thomas Florio has performed the piece regularly since 2017, frequently in collaboration with Finnish conductor Klaus Mäkelä. In 2024, with members of the Orchestre de Paris, they performed Eight Songs in a special concert in the Salle Daru of the Louvre Museum, in front of The Coronation of Napoleon. Díapason Magazine said of the performance, "The setting is grandiose; the dizzying embodiment, both vocal and physical, by Thomas Florio leaves the audience speechless, and a violin in pieces (it’s planned, but when it happens…). Just a breath away from the scene, from the singer, it was received as a true shock, not forgetting to notice the close and sincere friendship that binds Mäkelä to his musicians and the intensity with which he listens to and observes his singer."

The Bregenzer Festspiele commissioned the monodrama Farmer George from Finnish composer Osmo Tapio Räihälä, with a libretto by Thomas Florio, to be performed together with Eight Songs for a Mad King. With the same instrumentation as Maxwell Davies's work, Farmer George depicts the state of mind and the background of George III before his illness, and it is performed without intermission before Eight Songs for a Mad King. It is also published by Boosey & Hawkes. The pair of works premiered at the Bregenzer Festspiele in July 2025.
