= Paul Newham =

British psychotherapist (born 1962)

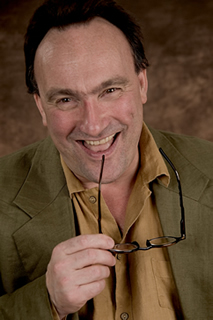
- Paul Newham
- Born: 16 March 1962 (age 64); United Kingdom

Paul Newham (born 16 March 1962) is a retired British psychotherapist known for developing techniques used in psychology and psychotherapy that make extensive use of the arts to facilitate and examine two forms of human communication: the interpersonal communication through which people speak aloud and listen to others, and the intrapersonal communication that enables individuals to converse silently with themselves. His methods emphasise the examination of traumatic experiences through literary and vocal mediums of expression, including creative writing, storytelling, and song. He is cited by peers as a pioneer in recognition of his original contribution to the expressive therapies.

Newham began by teaching young adults with physical and developmental disabilities, many of whom could not articulate speech, assisting them in combining instrumental music and nonverbal vocalisation as an expressive alternative to spoken communication. Subsequently, he worked psychotherapeutically with adults who were verbally articulate but could not satisfactorily communicate their reactions to traumatic events using spoken words. Therefore, Newham developed techniques that helped his clients understand the seemingly wordless nature of their distressing experience and express it through artistic mediums, including dance, music, and drama. These techniques have been incorporated into professional practice by practitioners from diverse disciplines.

== Childhood influence and education ==
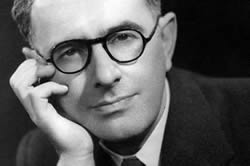
Bertold Paul Wiesner

Newham's biological father was Bertold Paul Wiesner (1901–1972), an Austrian Jewish physiologist known firstly for his research into human fertility and the diagnosis of pregnancy, and secondly for coining the term 'Psi' in 1942, now widely used to signify parapsychological phenomena.

Newham is one among hundreds of children conceived through the artificial insemination of Wiesner's sperm, facilitated by his wife, Doctor Mary Barton, an obstetrician who founded one of the first private fertility clinics, which operated in London from the 1940s until its closure in 1967. Barton and Wiesner falsely claimed that they procured sperm from a specially selected group of exceptionally intelligent anonymous donors, presuming their own identities would remain unknown after destroying all records of the clinic's clientele. However, reports published by British Newspapers in 2012 alleged that Wiesner provided his own sperm for many procedures. Subsequent DNA paternity testing of adults conceived at the clinic indicates that Wiesner may have sired more than 600 children by donating his sperm to artificial inseminations performed by Barton, of which Newham is one. Others include British barrister David Gollancz and Canadian filmmaker Barry Stevens.

Newham grew up falsely believing that his mother's abusive husband, Derek Joseph Newham, was his biological father. He frequently attempted to discern the subject of violent arguments between them as he listened in his bedroom, where only the timbre of their voices, including shouts, screams, and crying, was perceptible. This experience inspired Newham to investigate the psychology of the human voice, initially focusing on nonverbal expressions of emotion.

Newham originally trained in Stanislavski's system of method acting at the Drama Centre in London, where he studied the analytical psychology of Carl Jung and the movement analysis of Rudolf Laban under the tutelage of Yat Malmgren. After working in experimental theatre, Newham became interested in how the process of transformative arts can facilitate the well-being and empowerment of those who participate. He subsequently trained at Dartington College of Arts, where he studied Authentic Movement with Mary Fulkerson, contact improvisation with Steve Paxton, and cultural psychology with Anne Kilcoyne before pursuing post-graduate research at the universities of Warwick and Exeter.

== Work ==
=== The human voice ===
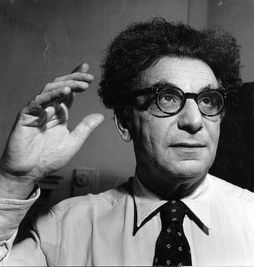
Alfred Wolfsohn

During his undergraduate studies at Dartington College of Arts, Newham was inspired by the life of German vocal coach Alfred Wolfsohn and the research conducted at the Alfred Wolfsohn Voice Research Centre.

Alfred Wolfsohn (1896–1962) was a German Jew who suffered persistent auditory hallucinations of screaming soldiers whom he had witnessed dying of wounds while serving as a stretcher bearer in the trenches of World War I at the age of eighteen. After being subsequently diagnosed with shell shock, Wolfsohn did not recover in response to hospitalisation or psychiatric treatment but claimed to have cured himself by vocalising the extreme sounds of his hallucinations, bringing about what he described as a combination of catharsis and exorcism. Wolfsohn was encouraged by the range and expressiveness of his voice, resulting from the vocal exercises and techniques he developed while attempting to heal the symptoms of trauma sustained during the war. He subsequently began teaching others, acting as both a singing teacher and psychotherapist, seeking to combine the principles of both disciplines.

Newham empathised with Wolfsohn's post-war trauma, having been traumatised by the sounds of violent arguing between his mother and Derek Newham while growing up. Therefore, he built upon and extended the endeavours begun at the Alfred Wolfsohn Voice Research Centre, aligning them with cognitive and psychophysiological principles. Newham alleged that vocalising might have therapeutic benefits comparable to those achieved through expressive therapies, including drama therapy, music therapy, and dance movement therapy.

While writing a monograph about the work of Alfred Wolfsohn, Newham collaborated with the British author, archivist, and curator Leslie Shepard, who documented work undertaken at the Voice Research Centre through film, sound recordings, and illustrated written diaries. Shepard also collected thousands of audio field recordings exemplifying diverse forms of music and song, including those from Africa, Asia, and the Americas, which he introduced to Newham. These recordings inspired Newham to study how performing and listening to sacred words and music, including hymns, chants, and mantras, contributes to many indigenous forms of religious experience, spiritual practice, and traditional medicine.

Newham initially investigated how different types of recorded sound, including spoken words, music, and ambient noise, can affect a listener, potentially precipitating a range of responses, including relaxation, hypnagogia, and experiences comparable to those reportedly achieved through meditation. Subsequently, he endeavoured to discover whether performing and listening to sacred and secular vocal arts, including prayers and ballads, might have a psychotherapeutic application.

Newham became particularly interested in the extensive range of vocal qualities that many indigenous peoples demonstrated. Therefore, he endeavoured to research the expressive potential of the human voice, furthering work begun by Wolfsohn and situating it in the context of contemporary musicology, psychology, and physiology. He began his research collaborating with Otorhinolaryngologist D. Garfield Davies at the Institute of Laryngology and Otology and School of Audiology allied to the Royal National Throat, Nose and Ear Hospital in London, now part of the UCL Ear Institute. Using various medical imaging techniques, including videostroboscopy, Garfield Davies filmed the vocal tract of vocalists as they made a broad range of sounds. Newham then subjected these recordings to analysis, associating specific perceptual qualities, such as pitch, breathiness, and nasality, with correlating articulations of the vocal tract. This research culminated in a methodological approach to interpreting and classifying the acoustic properties of vocal sound and facilitating flexible voice production, which is today incorporated into speech and language therapy, performing arts training, and the expressive therapies. Meanwhile, management and medical professionals have adopted his approach to analysing vocal communication.

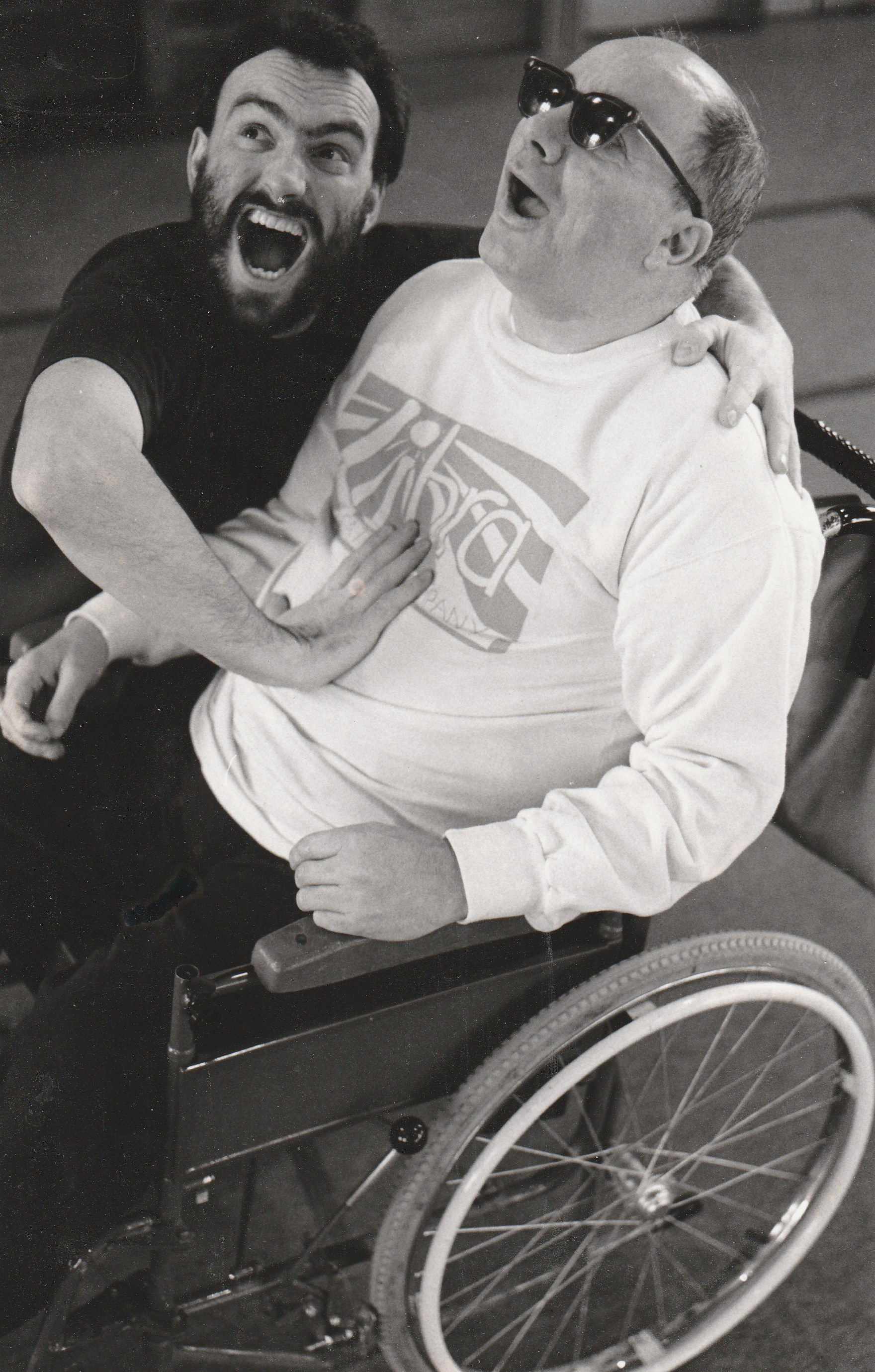
Paul Newham working with a member of Libra Theatre – a troupe comprising people with disabilities.

=== Special education ===
Newham began the practical application of his research while teaching young adults with special educational needs, including those with physical, learning, and developmental disabilities who could not articulate vocal sounds into intelligible speech, some of whom were members of Libra Theatre. While working with nonverbal populations, Newham developed techniques for interpreting the paralinguistic component of verbal communication, emphasising how characteristics such as pitch, loudness, and timbre enhance the expression of feelings through emotional prosody. Newham then musicalised their voices, producing devised theatre productions in which his clients performed vocally but not verbally. This process facilitated their experience of communicating to an audience through expressive use of the voice, which was uninhibited despite insurmountable restrictions to verbal communication. Newham alleged that this experience elicited a therapeutic effect for participants.

Subsequently, professionals have appropriated Newham's techniques for facilitating vocal expression to empower marginalised populations, support learning and language acquisition for children in primary and elementary education, and enhance the quality of care for people with dementia.

=== Psychology and psychotherapy ===
When some clinical and educational professionals commissioned to care for his disabled clientele began participating in these projects to experience a personal therapeutic benefit, Newham sought to discover whether his techniques might be transferable from special education and adapted for psychotherapy clients. Beginning with the professionals who cared for his special education students, Newham worked therapeutically with adults who, though neither physically disabled nor inhibited by a communication disorder, were distressed by a quality of psychological pain that they identified as beyond words. Many of them reported persistent symptoms of psychological trauma, often attributing their cause to events experienced during childhood, including sexual, physical, and verbal abuse, which they found difficult or impossible to describe verbally. In response, Newham developed a framework of techniques that helped his clients communicate the subjective nature of their experience through artistic activity, combining expressive movement, vocal music, drama, and the recitation of creative writing. These techniques used singing to accentuate and exaggerate non-linguistic components of vocal communication. They also transformed spoken prosody into original songs that expressed and affirmed the personality and personal identity of the vocalist, providing foundations upon which subsequent practitioners have developed psychotherapeutic applications of singing.

Newham aligned his initial approach to psychotherapy with the principles of analytical psychology developed by Swiss psychiatrist and psychoanalyst Carl Jung, who had previously inspired Alfred Wolfsohn. Newham specifically encouraged his clients to use vocal sounds to engage what Jung called 'active imagination'. As evolved by Jung, active imagination is a meditative technique comparable to daydreaming, by which patients evoke a sequence of mental images without deliberately influencing their nature while describing them to an analyst. In so doing, Jung urged patients not to avoid imagery they perceived as unpleasant and undesirable, indicative of what he called their 'shadow'. Newham developed this technique by enabling his clients to vocalise mental imagery through a broad range of sounds, including those they perceived as cacophonous and repulsive, which he interpreted as audible expressions of their shadow.

While working psychotherapeutically with adults, Newham discovered that many of them had vivid memories of their mothers' voices, which aroused intense negative and positive feelings. He subsequently encouraged his clients to express these feelings through nonverbal sounds of crying and calling. Newham concurred with theories drawn from psychoanalysis and developmental psychology, which propose that verbal and nonverbal components of maternal vocal communication contribute to the bonding between a mother and her baby while influencing the quality of attachment to her that the infant develops. He further developed a framework of practical techniques that enabled clients in group therapy to recreate this communication and subject their enactments to analysis. This method has contributed to professional psychotherapy as therapists working within a developmental framework have incorporated and expanded it.

Newham analysed two forms of communication used by his clients: the interpersonal communication through which they vocalised aloud and listened to the voices of others, and the intrapersonal communication through which they conversed silently with themselves. He subsequently adopted the psychotherapeutic hypothesis that intrapersonal dialogues express characteristics and perspectives of diverse subpersonalities and possible selves. In humanistic psychology, subpersonalities are temporary constellations of behaviours that enable someone to cope with transient psychosocial demands. Meanwhile, in cognitive psychology, possible selves are psychological schemas representing multiple alternative versions of the self, encompassing past and future selves that characterise regrets, doubts, hopes, worries, and fantasies about who we may have been and the person we may become. Identifying and verbally discussing their possible selves with a therapist is one strategy by which clients pursue positive cognitive, emotional, and behavioural change in psychotherapy. Newham's contribution to this field includes practical techniques that enable someone to identify inner voices, attribute them to specific subpersonalities or possible selves, express them through artistic mediums, and subsequently interpret their psychological significance.

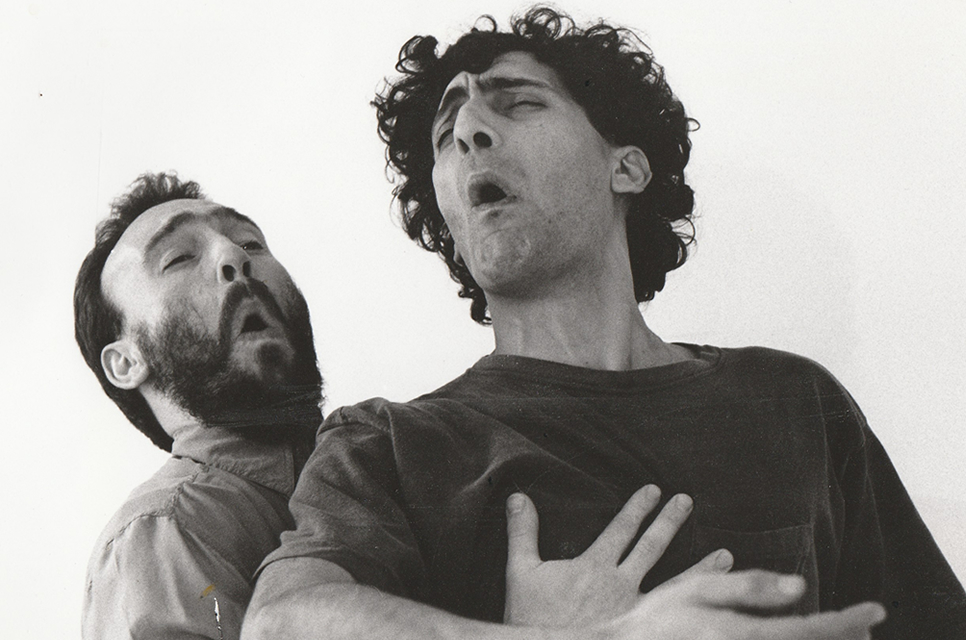
British psychotherapist Paul Newham conducting an expressive therapy session with a client.

=== Expressive therapies ===
While working with traumatised adults, Newham observed that although his clients struggled to communicate distressing thoughts and feelings with spoken dialogue, they could readily express themselves through creating and reciting vocal art forms, including song and poetry. In developing techniques to facilitate this opportunity, Newham situated his work within the paradigm of expressive therapy, which uses mediums of artistic creativity to investigate characteristics of subjective experience.

Newham began his work in the expressive therapies by facilitating dramatised vocal characterisations through which clients discovered how changing vocal qualities modified their perceived identity, personality, and self-image. Newham observed that this often precipitated expression of intense feelings preceded by acute anxiety. Therefore, he evolved techniques that helped his clients sustain these feelings without becoming overwhelmed. Many of these techniques incorporated physical exercises designed to expand the spectrum of expressible feelings by increasing the flexibility of the vocal tract. This endeavour has been compared to the vocal experiments conducted by Polish theatre director Jerzy Grotowski, which aim to eliminate the psychological and physical inhibitors of vocal expression. Newham discovered that musicalising the monologues recited by his clients significantly contributed to the process of simultaneously expressing and regulating the feelings evoked by them. Subsequently, he developed techniques to facilitate his clients in translating their experiences into monologues and ballads that narrated and musicalised disturbing memories. To further elaborate an artistic framework for expressing emotionally intense personal experience, Newham enabled his clients to accompany their recitals with authentic choreographed movements. Through this work, Newham integrated therapeutic applications of music, drama, and movement into a framework of principles and techniques that prioritises vocal communication, which scholars and practitioners of the expressive therapies have studied and assimilated into their practice.

=== Arts-based research and performing arts ===
Newham's approach to therapeutic facilitation is cited as an example of art-based research, which is the systematic use of techniques integral to the artistic process as a primary way of examining and understanding human experience. Newham has composed and performed a range of works demonstrating the effect that sound, specifically the human voice, has on a listener. These include a musical score using extended vocal technique for the production House of Bones, produced by Motionhouse, about 'the plight of the scapegoat and those isolated by prejudice, ignorance and difference'. Meanwhile, his recorded works use techniques derived from receptive music therapy and audio therapy. These works combine sound, speech, and music to which recipients listen while intending to experience a subsequent beneficial physical, psychological, or social effect.

== Influence and contribution ==
The principles and methods developed by Newham have been incorporated into professional practice by a diverse range of practitioners including psychotherapists, speech and language therapists, drama therapists, music therapists, and dance movement therapists. Paul Newham is particularly recognised as a pioneer for his contribution to the expressive therapies.

== Selected publications ==
=== Books ===
Newham, Paul (1999). Using Voice and Theatre in Therapy. London: Jessica Kingsley. ISBN 978-1853025914.

Newham, Paul (1999). Using Voice and Movement in Therapy. London: Jessica Kingsley. ISBN 978-1853025921.

Newham, Paul (1999). Using Voice and Song in Therapy. London: Jessica Kingsley. ISBN 978-1853025907.

Newham, Paul (1998). Therapeutic Voicework. London: Jessica Kingsley. ISBN 978-1853023613.

=== Articles ===
Newham, Paul (1992). "Jung and Alfred Wolfsohn: Analytical psychology and the singing voice". Journal of Analytical Psychology. 37 (3): 323–336. doi:10.1111/j.1465-5922.1992.00323.x.

Newham, Paul (1992). "The psychology of voice and the founding of the Roy Hart theatre". New Theatre Quarterly. 9 (33): 59–65. doi:10.1017/S0266464X00007478.

Newham, Paul (1994). "Voice Movement Therapy: Towards an arts therapy for voice". Dramatherapy. 16 (2–3): 28–33. doi:10.1080/02630672.1994.9689382. S2CID 143754636.

Newham, Paul (1995–1996). "Making a song and dance: the musical voice of language". Journal of the Imagination in Learning. 3 (1): 66–74. ISSN 1071-6157.

Newham, Paul (1992). "Singing and psyche: towards voice movement therapy". Voice: Journal of the British Voice Association. 1 (1): 75–102.
