= Stretcher bearer =

Person who carries a stretcher

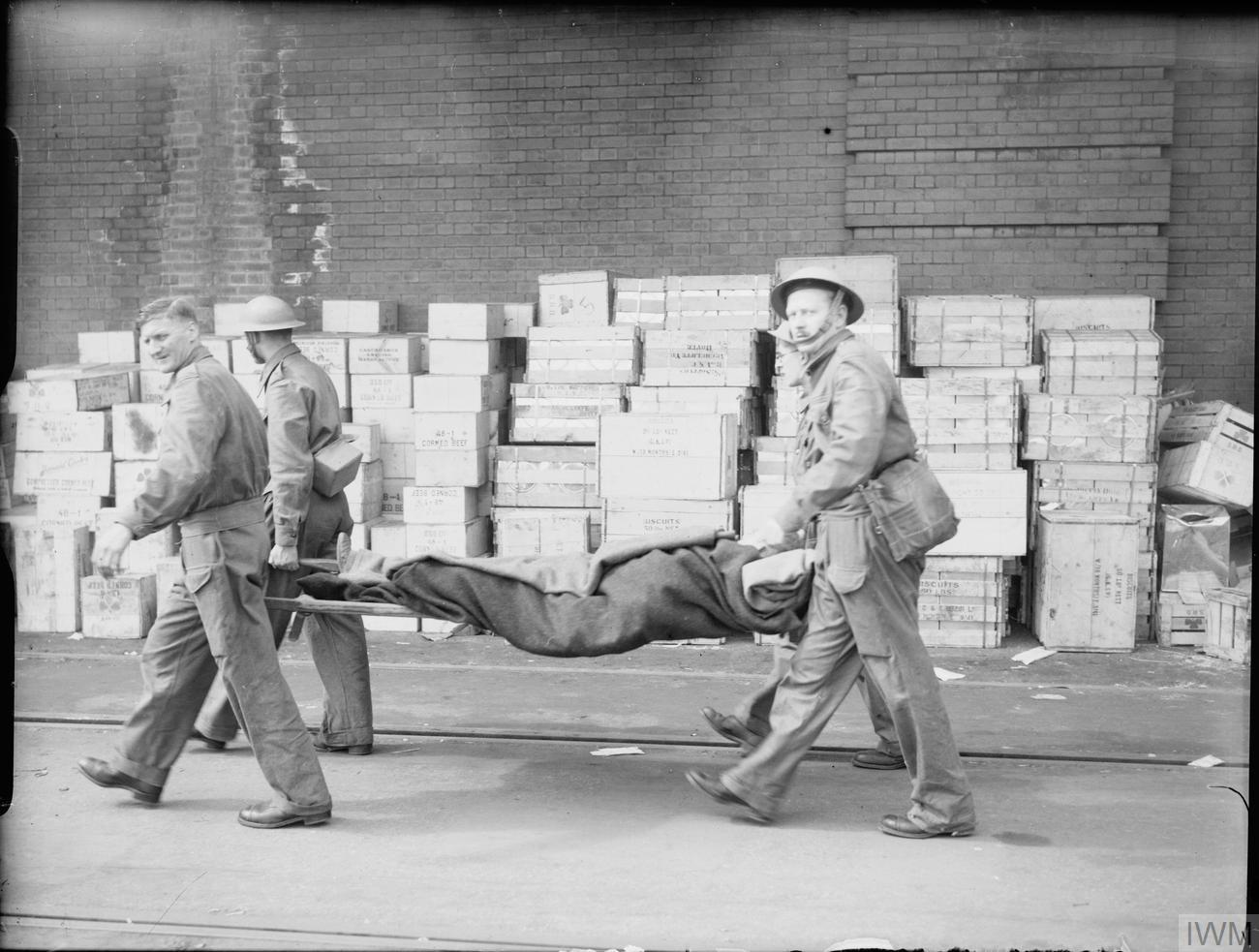
British stretcher bearers in Dunkirk evacuation of World War II.

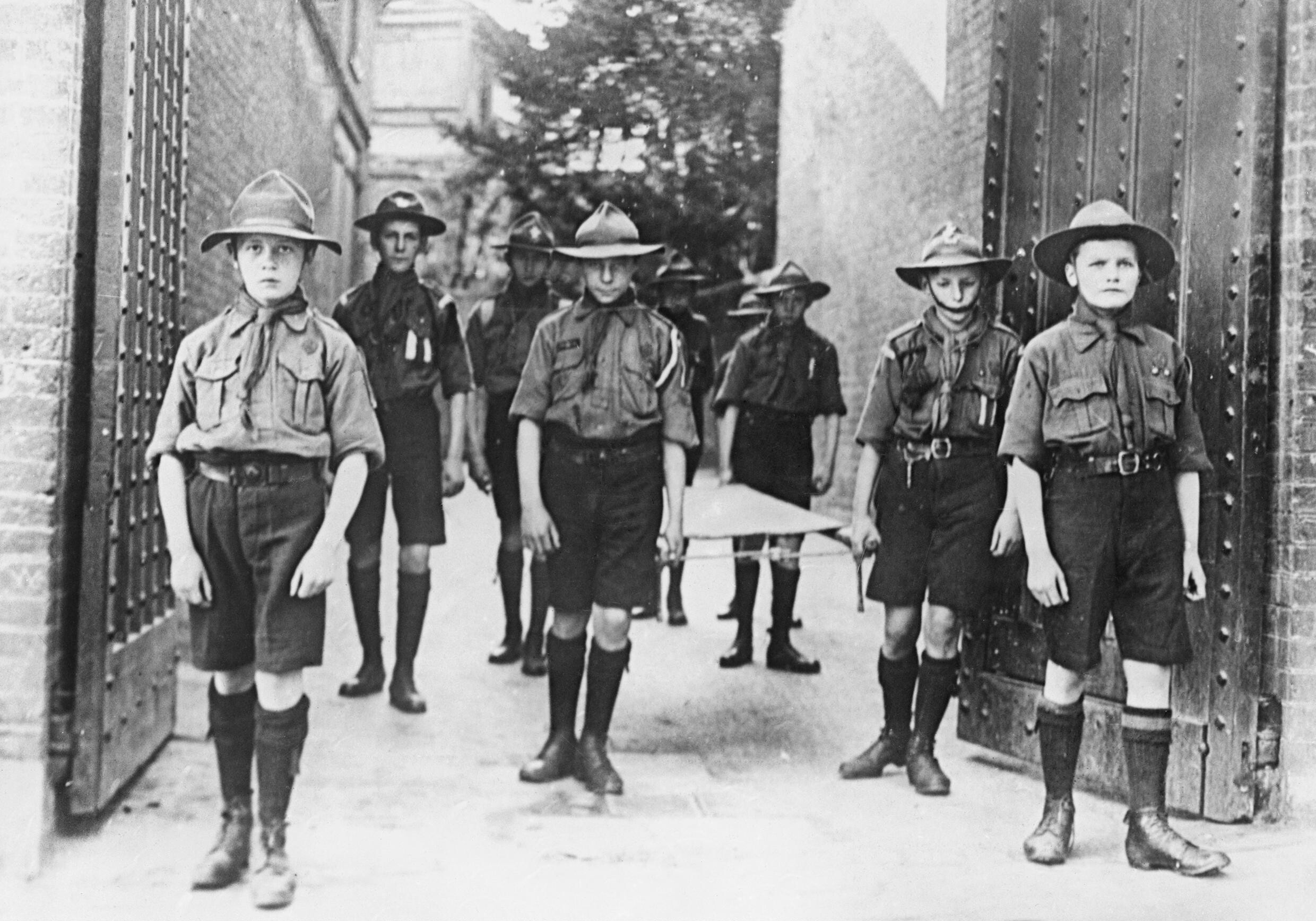
Boy Scouts in the United Kingdom working as stretcher-bearers during World War I

A stretcher-bearer is a person who carries a stretcher, generally with another person at its other end, especially in a war or emergency times when there is a very serious accident or a disaster.

In the case of military personnel, for example removing wounded or dead from a battlefield, the modern term is a combat medic, who would have received considerable training. Stretcher-bearers would have received basic first-aid training. The wounded soldier had to wait until the stretcher-bearers arrived or simply the stretcher-bearers would find them.

In times of war, stretcher-bearers may in certain situations be covered by Art. 25 of the First (Geneva) Convention of 1949 under the category of auxiliary medical personnel.

== Origin ==
This term appears between 1875 and 1880 . It is largely used before and up to the Second World War and is derived from the British English verb to stretcher, which means "to carry someone on a stretcher".

A stretcher-bearer party, sometimes a stretcher party or company, is a group or a band of people temporarily or regularly associated which have to carry injured persons with stretchers. In the army stretcher-bearers were a kind of specific soldiers who work with military ambulances and medical services. A famous stretcher-bearer and ambulance driver during the First World War was the young Ernest Hemingway.

== See also ==
- Air-sea rescue
- Air ambulance
- Ambulance
- Lifeguard
- Medical assistant
- Medical evacuation
- Polytrauma
