= Kurt Singer (musicologist) =

German neurologist, conductor and musicologist

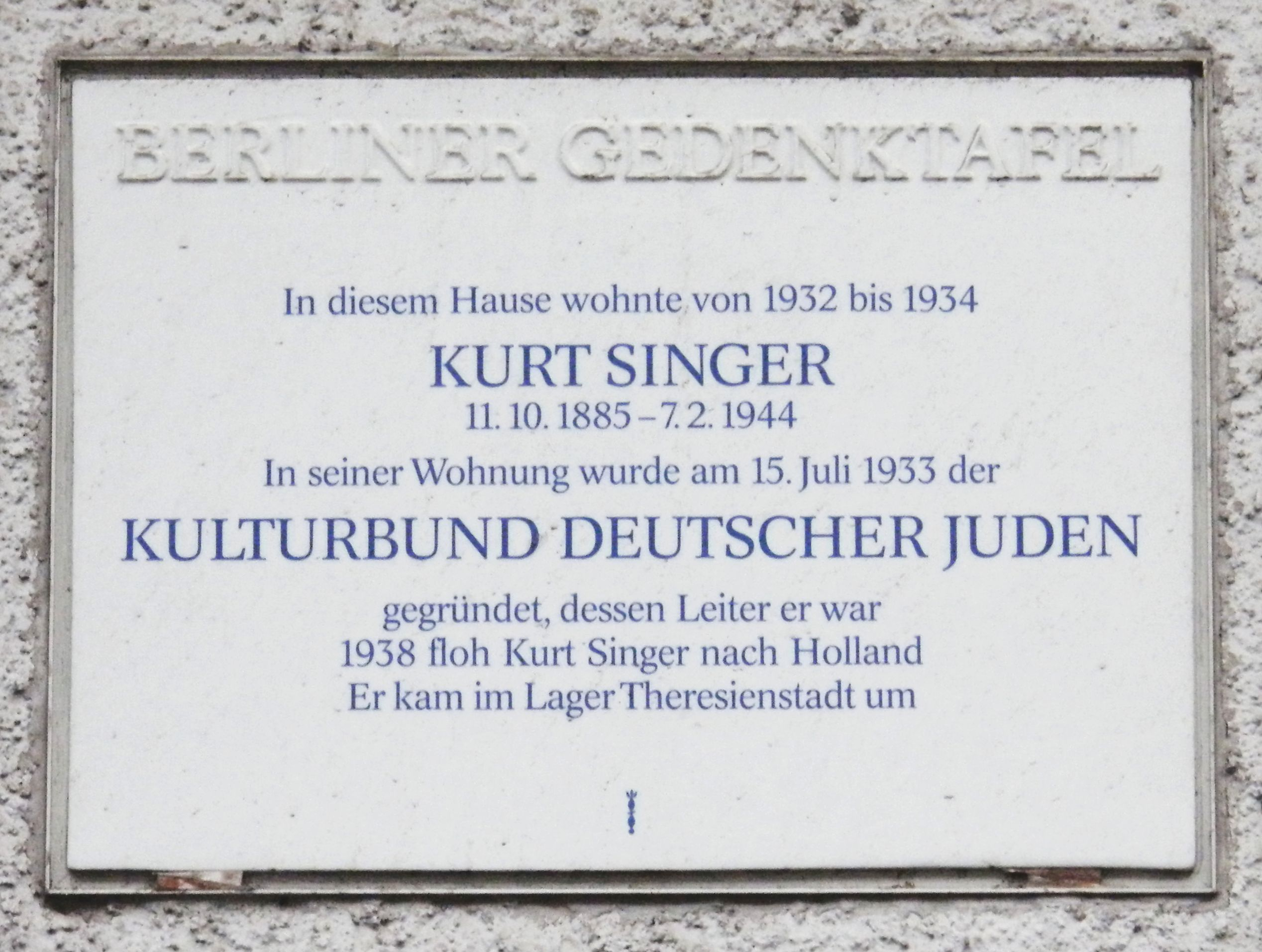
Berliner Gedenktafel: Kurt Singer und der Kulturbund Deutscher Juden

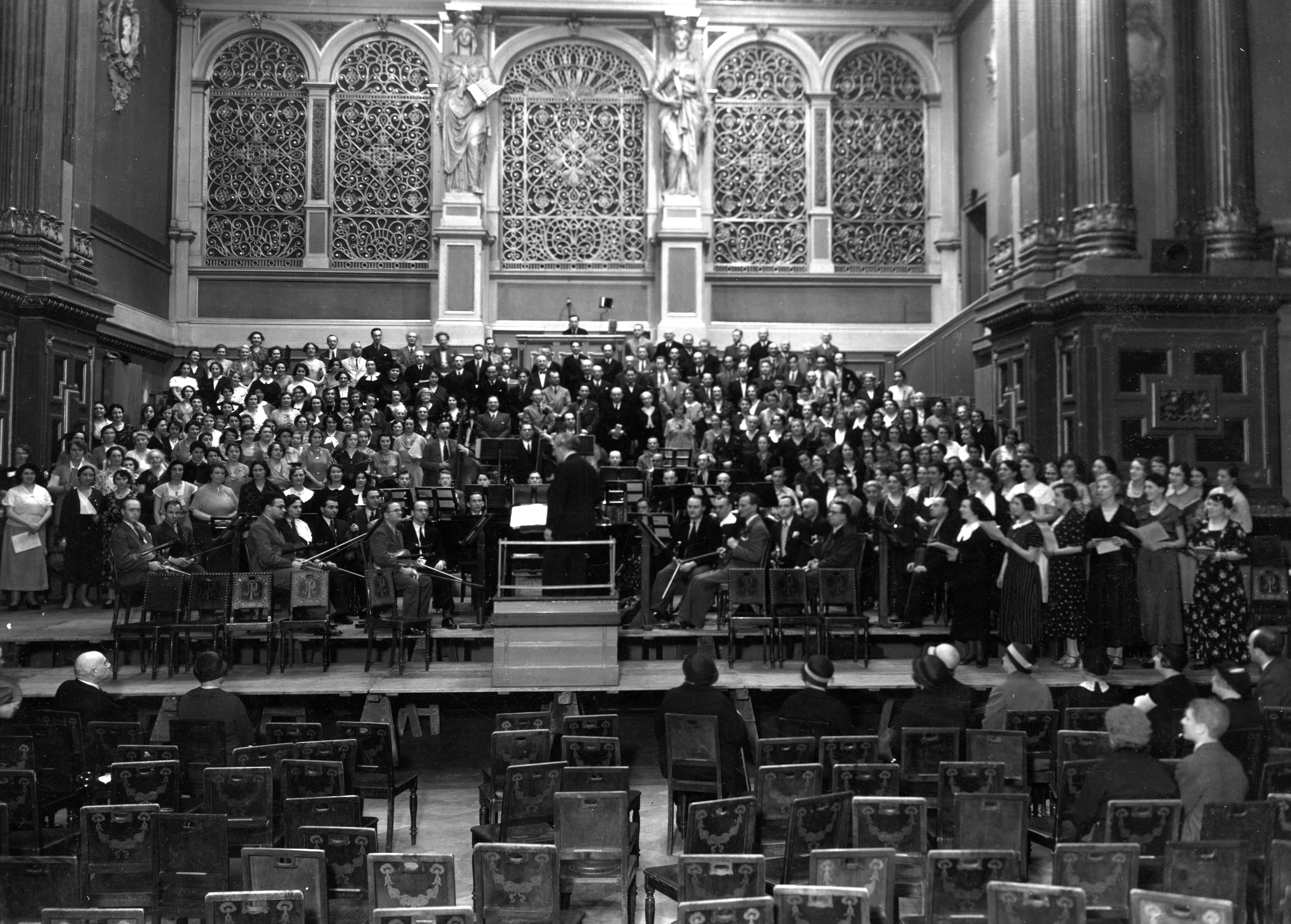
Kurt Singer conducts Judas Maccabaeus with the Orchestra of the Jüdischer Kulturbund in the Berliner Philharmonie, Bernburger Straße, 7 and 8 May 1934

Kurt Singer (11 October 1885 – 7 February 1944) was a German neurologist, musicologist, conductor and chairman of the Jüdischer Kulturbund. He was murdered in the Holocaust.

== Life ==
Born in Kościerzyna, Singer, son of a rabbi, spent his youth in Koblenz. After graduating from high school he studied medicine, psychology and musicology. A medical doctor, he had received his doctorate in medicine in 1908 and initially worked as a neurologist at the Berlin Charité.

He earned an Iron Cross for his gallantry in World War I.

Since 1910, he wrote music reviews. In 1913, he founded the Berliner Ärztechor, which he directed until the Nazi Germany era. In 1923, he became professor at the Staatliche Akademische Hochschule für Musik, where he could teach as well as do research. Three years later, his work Die Berufskrankheiten der Musiker was published. From 1923 to 1932, Singer was head of the medical advisory service at the Academy of Music and gave lectures on occupational diseases of musicians. From 1927 to 1931, he was temporarily deputy and then director of the Deutsche Oper Berlin At the Academy of Music, he was dismissed in Autumn 1932 because of alleged financial difficulties. When, after the Machtergreifung in 1933, numerous musicians of Jewish origin lost their jobs in accordance with the Law for the Restoration of the Professional Civil Service, he founded the "jüdischen Kulturbund".

Singer emigrated to Amsterdam in 1938. He was arrested in 1943, first in the Westerbork transit camp, then deported in the Theresienstadt Ghetto. He died there on 7 February 1944 as a result of the prison conditions at the age of 58.

The Kurt-Singer-Institut für Musikphysiologie und Musikergesundheit at the Hochschule für Musik "Hanns Eisler" and the Academy of Arts, Berlin are named after him.

== Publications ==
Articles:

in Gemeindeblatt der Juedischen Gemeinde zu Berlin:

- Die Welt des "Fidelio", Jg. 24. 1934, Nr. 41 (3 November 1934), S. 3
- Disput über Saint-Saëns' Oper "Samson und Dalila", Jg. 26. 1936, Nr. 11 (15 March 1936), S. 9
- Dr. Singer erklärt, Jg. 26. 1936, Nr. 21 (24 May 1936), S. 22
- Die nächste Kulturbund-Premiere, Jg. 26. 1936, Nr. 22 (31 May 1936), S. 9
- Kulturbund vor Gericht, Jg. 26. 1936, Nr. 27 (5 July 1936), S. 3
- Kulturbundbilanz 1936, Jg. 27. 1937, Nr. 1 (3y January 1937), S. 4
- Händels "Israel", Jg. 27. 1937, Nr. 6 (7 February 1937), S. 11
- Der Jüdische Kulturbund wirbt!, Jg. 27. 1937, Nr. 34 (22 August 1937), S. 3
- Wie organisieren wir das Hauskonzert?, Jg. 27. 1937, Nr. 39 (26 September 1937), S. 17
- "Wenn ich König wär", Jg. 28. 1938, Nr. 7 (13 February 1938), S. 5
- "Die schöne Helena", Jg. 28. 1938, Nr. 23 (5 June 1938), S. 7
- Hilfe für jüdische Autoren, Jg. 28. 1938, Nr. 40 (2 October 1938), S. 4

in the Sozialistische Warte:

- Sozialistische Bewegung, Jg. 12. 1937, Nr. 23 (5 November 1937), p. 543
