= Extended vocal technique =

Unconventional, unorthodox, or non-traditional methods of singing

Vocalists are capable of producing a variety of extended technique sounds. These alternative singing techniques have been used extensively in the 20th century, especially in art song and opera. Particularly famous examples of extended vocal technique can be found in the music of Luciano Berio, John Cage, George Crumb, Diamanda Galás, Peter Maxwell Davies, Hans Werner Henze, György Ligeti, Demetrio Stratos, Meredith Monk, Giacinto Scelsi, Arnold Schoenberg, Salvatore Sciarrino, Karlheinz Stockhausen, Tim Foust, Avi Kaplan, and Trevor Wishart.

== Timbral techniques ==
=== Phrasing ===
==== Spoken ====
Spoken text is frequently employed. The Italian term "parlato" has a similar meaning.

==== Sprechgesang ====
Sprechgesang is a combination singing and speaking. It is usually heavily associated with Arnold Schoenberg (particularly his Pierrot Lunaire which uses sprechgesang for its entire duration) and the Second Viennese School. Schoenberg notated sprechgesang by placing a small cross through the stem of a note which indicates approximate pitch. In more modern music “sprechgesang” is frequently simply written over a passage of music.

==== Inhaling ====
Singing is produced while a singer is inhaling. It is used in experimental contemporary classical compositions, such as in the 2006 chamber opera Ursularia by Nicholas DeMaison, for its ability to produce a variety of extreme high and low pitches impossible to create in typical exhaled vocals. In popular music styles, ingressive singing can be combined with vocal distortion techniques for extreme metal vocals like death metal growls. In beatboxing, it is used to create certain percussion sounds (like the "inward K snare"). A careful mixture of ingressive and egressive sounds allows a beatboxer to sustain a rhythmic phrase indefinitely without needing to pause for breath.

=== Pitch ===
==== Falsetto ====
A vocal technique allowing the singer to sing notes higher than their modal vocal range.

==== Glottal sounds ====
A "frying"-type sound may be produced by means of the glottis. This technique has been frequently used by Meredith Monk.

==== Yodelling ====
Yodelling is performed by rapidly alternating between a singer's chest and head voice.

==== Ululation ====
A long, wavering, high-pitched vocal sound resembling a howl with a trilling quality. It is produced by emitting a high-pitched loud voice accompanied with a rapid back-and-forth movement of the tongue and the uvula. Ululation is practiced in certain styles of singing, as well as in communal ritual events, used to express strong emotion.

Squeaking

The thyrohyoid muscle can be tensed when speaking to shorten the vocal cords, allowing the use of an extremely high pitch but with a different timbre and resonance compared to a typical falsetto. This technique was originated and named by the rapper 645AR.

=== Reverberation ===
==== Vocal tremolo ====
A vocal tremolo is performed by rapidly pulsing the air expelled from the singer's lungs while singing a pitch. These pulses usually occur from 4–8 times per second.

==== Vocal trill ====
A vocal trill is performed by adding singing vibrato while performing a vocal tremolo.

=== Harmonics ===
==== Overtones ====
By manipulating the vocal cavity, overtones may be produced. Although used in the traditional music of Mongolia, Tuva, and Tibet, overtones have also been used in the contemporary compositions of Karlheinz Stockhausen (Stimmung), as well as in the work of David Hykes.

==== Undertones ====
By carefully controlling the configurations of the vocal cords, a singer may obtain "undertones" which may produce period doubling, tripling or a higher degree of multiplication; this may give rise to tones that fairly coincide with those of an inverse harmonic series. Although the octave below is the most frequently used undertone, a twelfth below and other lower undertones are also possible. This technique has been used most notably by Joan La Barbara..However, undertones may be generated by processes that include more than the vocal folds. For instance, the ventricular folds (also called the false vocal folds) may be recruited, probably by solely aerodynamic forces, and made to vibrate with the vocal folds, generating undertones, like those found, for instance, in Tibetan low-pitched chant.

==== Multiphonics ====
By overstressing or by asymmetrically contracting the laryngeal muscles, a multiphonic or chord may be produced. This technique features in the 1968 composition Versuch über Schweine by the German composer Hans Werner Henze. In voice pathology, there are various descriptions of somewhat similar effects, such as those found in patients with diplophonia, a condition that produces a "double voice", i.e., two or even more simultaneous pitches.

=== Distortion ===
==== Buccal speech ====
A form of alaryngeal speech that has a high pitch that can be used for speaking and singing. It is most familiar as the voice of Donald Duck.

Esophageal speech

A form of alaryngeal speech that uses the upper esophagus for speech and singing, often taught to patients after laryngectomy. It is deeper than laryngeal speech, as well as more raspy and breathy, and uses similar vocal anatomy to the death growl. The American rapper The D.O.C., an esophageal speaker following medical treatment that damaged his vocal cords in 1989, raps in this style throughout his horrorcore album Helter Skelter and his other performances as a vocalist following the accident. The Shout At Cancer Choir, a choir made of people whose larynxes have been removed or damaged, has received international acclaim for its performances of contemporary choral pieces written specifically for esophageal voices.

== Non-vocal sounds ==
Besides producing sounds with the mouth, singers can be required to clap or snap their fingers, shuffle their feet, or slap their body. This is usually notated by writing the appropriate word over a note. These gestures are sometimes written on a separate one-line staff as well.

== Artificial timbral changes ==
=== Inhalation of gases ===
Inhaled helium is occasionally used to drastically change the timbre of the voice. When inhaled, helium changes the resonant properties of the human vocal track resulting in a very high squeaky voice. In Salvatore Martirano's composition L’s GA the singer is required to inhale from a helium mask.

Conversely, an unnaturally low voice may be achieved by asking the singer to inhale sulfur hexafluoride. This technique carries higher risk than helium inhalation due to the gas's heavy weight causing it to settle in the lungs, where it displaces oxygen.

During the production of the album Eternal Atake 2, the rapper Lil Uzi Vert was recorded in the studio inhaling a gas that appeared to be nitrous oxide, an anesthetic that is used recreationally and that creates an unnaturally deep voice when inhaled. The album heavily uses low-pitched vocals which sound identical to the effects of nitrous oxide on the voice, though it is unconfirmed if these were created by inhaling gas, or through digital manipulation to give a similar effect.

=== Artificial vocal enhancement ===
Amplification, such as microphone or even megaphone, possibly with electronic distortion of the voice, is frequently used in contemporary composition. Through the use of various electronic distortion techniques, vocal enhancement possibilities are nearly unlimited. A good example of this technique can be found in much of the music written and performed by Laurie Anderson.

Since its invention in the 1990s, Auto-Tune and other digital pitch correction methods have been widely used in commercial music genres to create expressive effects, popularized by artists in many genres including the pop singer Cher, the R&B singer T-Pain, and the hip-hop artist Future. Contemporary raï and Berber folk music, which historically placed emphasis on glissando, embraced Auto-Tune to enhance the beauty of vocals.

=== Singing into the piano ===
There are a number of pieces which require a singer to lean over a (sometimes amplified) piano and sing directly into the strings. If the strings are not damped, the effect is to start audible sympathetic vibrations in the piano. By far the most famous piece to use this technique is Ancient Voices of Children by George Crumb.

=== Mechanical vibration of the vocal cavity ===
There are devices that create a vibration to be controlled by the resonance of the user's mouth and throat, usually intended as medical devices to allow speakers to produce more audible speech without engaging their larynx. Devices in this family include the Sonovox, invented in 1939, which was used by German synthpop acts by Kraftwerk and Trio; the electrolarynx, of which numerous refinements have been made allowing users to sing by controlling its pitch manually; and the talk box, used by funk vocalist Roger Troutman of Zapp and virtuoso rock guitarist Peter Frampton.

== Notable performers using extended vocal techniques ==
* Al Jarreau
- George "Corpsegrinder" Fisher
- Björk
- Laurie Anderson
- Gelsey Bell
- Cathy Berberian
- Yma Súmac
- Iva Bittová
- Thomas Buckner
- Jill Burton
- Jan DeGaetani
- Paul Dutton
- Diamanda Galás
- Roy Hart
- Imogen Heap
- Shelley Hirsch
- David Hykes
- Nicholas Isherwood
- Sofia Jernberg
- Joan La Barbara
- Phil Minton
- Fatima Miranda
- Meredith Monk
- David Moss
- Sainkho Namtchylak
- Yoko Ono
- Mike Patton
- Carol Plantamura
- Vahram Sargsyan
- Alice Shields
- Demetrio Stratos
- Michael Vetter
- Jennifer Walshe
- Trevor Wishart
- Alfred Wolfsohn
- Savina Yannatou
- Pamela Z
- Jim Morrison

== See also ==
- Throat singing
