= A Song for Summer =

1997 romance novel by Eva Ibbotson

- First edition
- Author: Eva Ibbotson
- Language: English
- Genre: Historical romance, YA
- Publisher: Century
- Publication date: 1997
- Publication place: United Kingdom
- Media type: Print
- Pages: 288 pp
- ISBN: 0-7126-7809-3

A Song for Summer is a romance novel by British author Eva Ibbotson, first published in 1997. Eva Ibbotson is possibly best known as an award-winning and prolific author of children's books, but she also wrote many beloved romance novels for the adult market, of which A Song for Summer was the last. This novel and four others (A Countess Below Stairs, A Company of Swans, The Reluctant Heiress, and The Morning Gift) were reissued between 2007 and 2009 for the young adult market.

== Synopsis ==
Set in early 1940s Austria, the novel centers around a young English woman named Ellen Carr. Raised in a family of prominent suffragettes, Ellen, to the surprise of all friends and family, grows up with a great love of all things domestic. Inspired by Henny, the servant/partner of her grandfather, she enjoys cooking, cleaning and the various other chores that her mother and aunts have abandoned in their academic and feminist pursuits. While Ellen attends University to please her family, she leaves school before her final exams when Henny contracts cancer in order to be at her side.

After Henny's death, Ellen travels to Austria, Henny's homeland, to work as the housemother of the Hallendorf School, a progressive institution focused on the arts and attended largely by children from wealthy families. She discovers that many of the students have been neglected by their parents, who treat the school as a place to send children they consider burdensome. Ellen becomes a maternal figure to many of the students, offering them support and encouragement. Set in the Austrian countryside, the novel also introduces a range of unconventional teachers and students, as well as Marek, a gardener and fencing instructor with whom Ellen develops a relationship. Their lives are increasingly overshadowed by the growing influence of Nazi Germany.

But when she discovers that Marek is actually a famous musician working with various Resistances to smuggle Jews to safety, Ellen begins to realize the depth of her feelings for him—and the danger their newfound love faces in the shadow of war.
