= Georgia Groome =

English actress (born 1992)

- Born: Georgia Isobel Groome; 11 February 1992 (age 34); Nottingham, England
- Education: Trent College
- Occupation: Actress
- Years active: 2001–present
- Partner: Rupert Grint (2011–present)
- Children: 2

Georgia Isobel Groome (born 11 February 1992) is an English actress. She is best known for her roles in the films London to Brighton (2006) and Angus, Thongs and Perfect Snogging (2008).

== Early life ==
Georgia Isobel Groome was born on 11 February 1992 in Nottingham, England, the daughter of Paul Groome (1963–2009), a publican and chef, and Fiona (née Tulloch) Watson, a drama and vocal coach. She resided in Swarkestone, Derbyshire. She has two sisters. Groome, at the age of nine, auditioned for a role in the touring stage version of the musical Annie Get Your Gun and got the part. She trained at her mother's performing arts school, at Nottingham Television Workshop, Derby Youth Theatre, and Trent College.

== Career ==
Groome made her acting debut in the 2001 TV film, A Fish Out of Water. She subsequently played an orphan in an episode of the short-lived TV series, Dangerville.

When Groome was 14, she was cast in her first feature film role in the British independent film London to Brighton in 2006, playing an 11-year-old runaway. That year, she was also one of the eight young adventurers on Serious Amazon for CBBC. In 2007, Groome had a role in Elaine Wickham's short, My Mother.

In 2008, Groome had a minor role in the comedy-horror The Cottage. Her breakthrough role was as 14-year-old, boyfriend-searching Georgia Nicolson alongside Aaron Johnson in the 2008 film Angus, Thongs and Perfect Snogging, for which she won the award for Best Child Actor at the Buster International Children's Film Festival. She also had a minor role in horror film The Disappeared.

In 2009, she made her stage debut in Tusk Tusk, a new play by Polly Stenham at the Royal Court Theatre in London. The same year, she appeared in the short Leaving Eva and an episode of The Bill. In 2010, Groome appeared in an episode of British television detective drama Lewis, as well as the short Silent Things.

In 2011, Groome starred in two shorts, The True Meaning of Love and Six Degrees. She also appeared in Susan Jacobson's The Holding and had a lead role in The Great Ghost Rescue, a film adaptation of Eva Ibbotson's book of the same name.

She appeared alongside Stephen Dillane in Papadopoulos & Sons, in which she played snobby fashion victim Katie. The film was released in the UK through Cineworld on 5 April 2013.

== Personal life ==
Groome has been in a relationship with actor Rupert Grint since 2011. They have two daughters.

== Filmography ==
=== Film ===
Year	Film	Role	Notes
2006	London to Brighton	Joanne	Film debut
2007	My Mother	Millie	
2008	The Cottage	Farmer's Daughter 1	
2008	Angus, Thongs and Perfect Snogging	Georgia Nicolson	
2009	The Disappeared	Sophie Pryor	
2009	Leaving Eva	Kiera	
2010	Silent Things	Amy	Short film
2011	The True Meaning of Love	Alice	
2011	Six Degrees	Young Girl	Short film
2011	The Holding	Gemma	
2011	The Great Ghost Rescue	Winifred	
2012	Papadopoulos & Sons	Katie Papadopoulos	
2016	Life In Orbit	Laura	Short film
2017	Double Date	Lulu	

=== Television ===
Year	Title	Role	Notes
2001	A Fish Out of Water	Jenny	TV film
2003	Dangerville	Orphan Episode 1	Episode: "Robots"
2006	Serious Amazon	Herself	
2008	Loose Women	Herself	
2009	The Bill	Paige Farrelly	Episode: "Powerless"
2010	Lewis	Briony Grahame	Episode: "The Dead of Winter"
2013–15	Up the Women	Emily	

=== Radio ===
Year	Title	Role	Notes
2010	Maidens' Trip	Nanette	BBC Radio 4 Afternoon Play, broadcast 8 October 2010
2012	The Warrah	Amy	BBC Radio 4 From Fact to Fiction, broadcast 18 February 2012
2013	The Cazalets	Clary	BBC Radio 4 15 Minute Drama, broadcast 1–11 January 2013
2016	The Tunnel	Chloe	BBC Radio 4 Drama, broadcast 12 August 2016
2016	Northanger Abbey	Catherine Morland	BBC Radio 4 Drama, broadcast December 2016
2016	The Mysteries of Udolpho	Emily	BBC Radio 4 Drama, broadcast December 2016
2019	The Diary of a Young Girl	Anne Frank	BBC Radio 4 Book of the Week reading, broadcast May 2019

=== Theatre ===
Year	Title	Role	Notes
2009	Tusk Tusk		Royal Court Theatre
2013	Tutto Bene, Mamma?	Boy	The Print Room
2016	Clickbait	Nicola	Theatre503
