= Wiener Riesenrad =

Ferris wheel in Vienna, Austria

Coordinates: 48.2166505°N 16.3959494°E

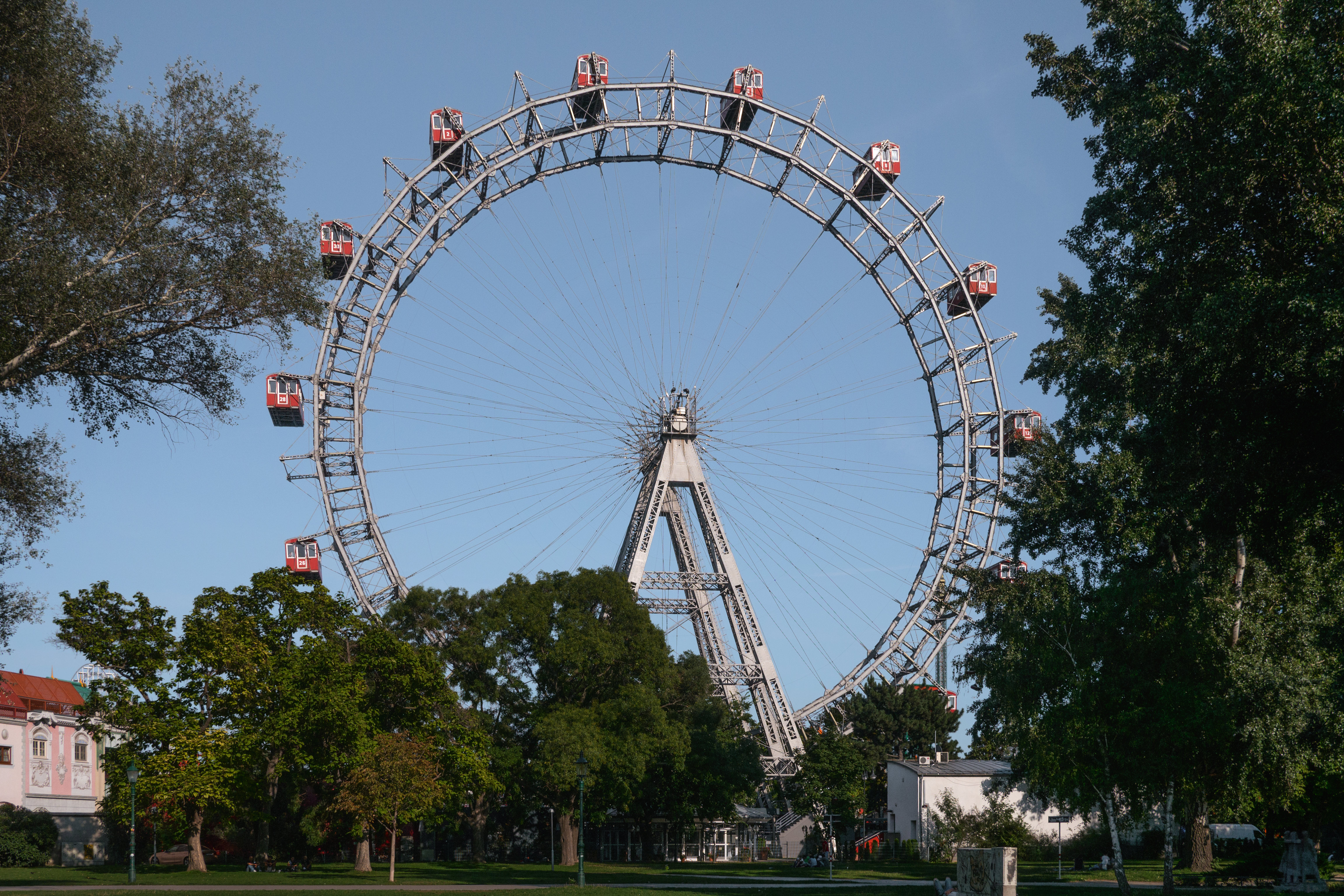
The Riesenrad, seen from the outside of the Prater

The Wiener Riesenrad (German: [ˈviːnɐ ˈʁiːzn̩ˌʁaːd]; 'Vienna Giant [Ferris] Wheel'), or simply Riesenrad, is a 64.75-metre (212 ft) tall Ferris wheel at the entrance of the Prater amusement park in Leopoldstadt, the 2nd district of Austria's capital Vienna. It is one of Vienna's most popular tourist attractions, and symbolises the district as well as the city for many people. Constructed in 1897, it was the world's tallest extant Ferris wheel from 1920 until 1985.

== History ==
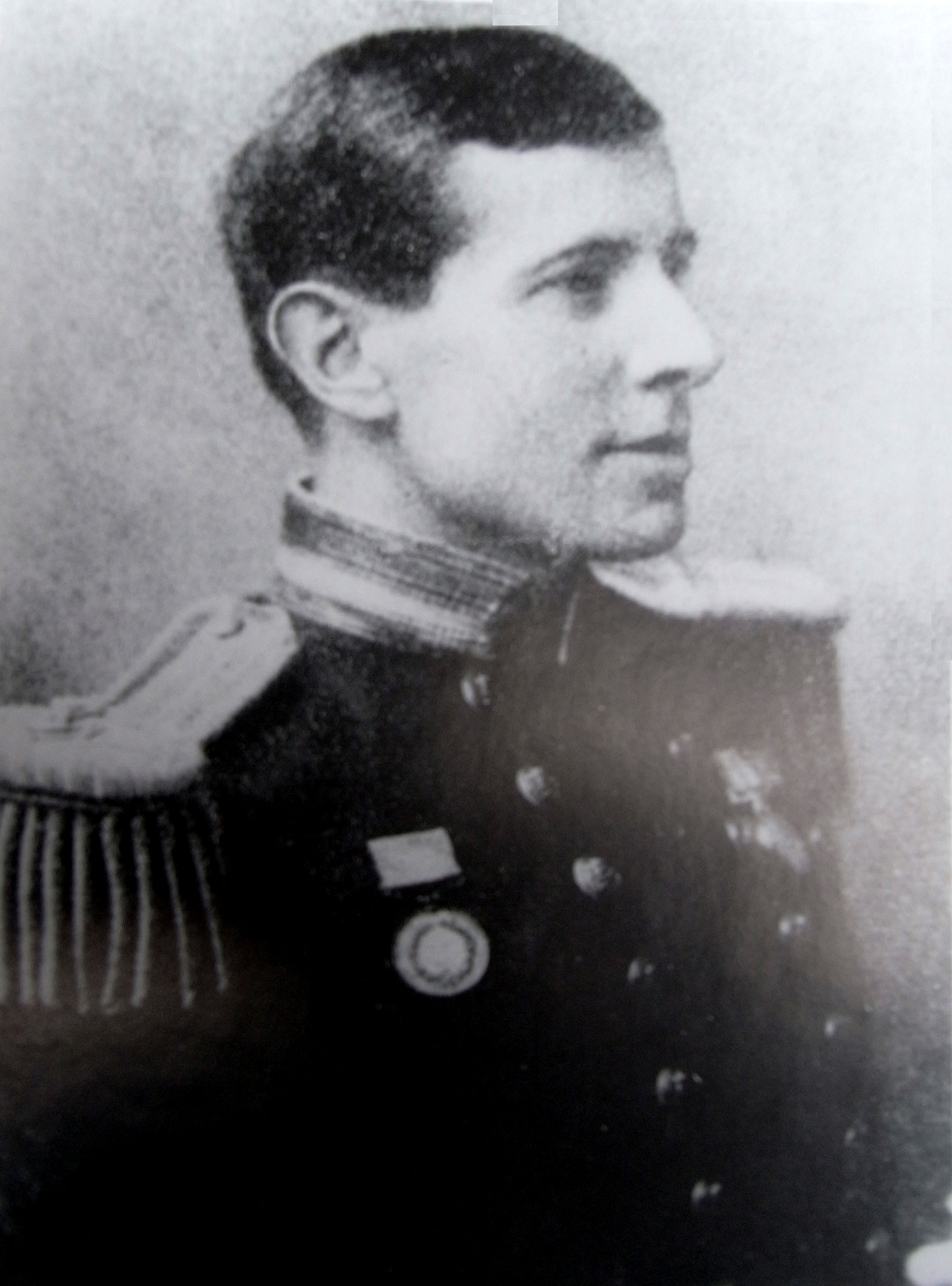
Lt. Walter Basset Bassett (1864-1907), RN, builder of the Wiener Riesenrad

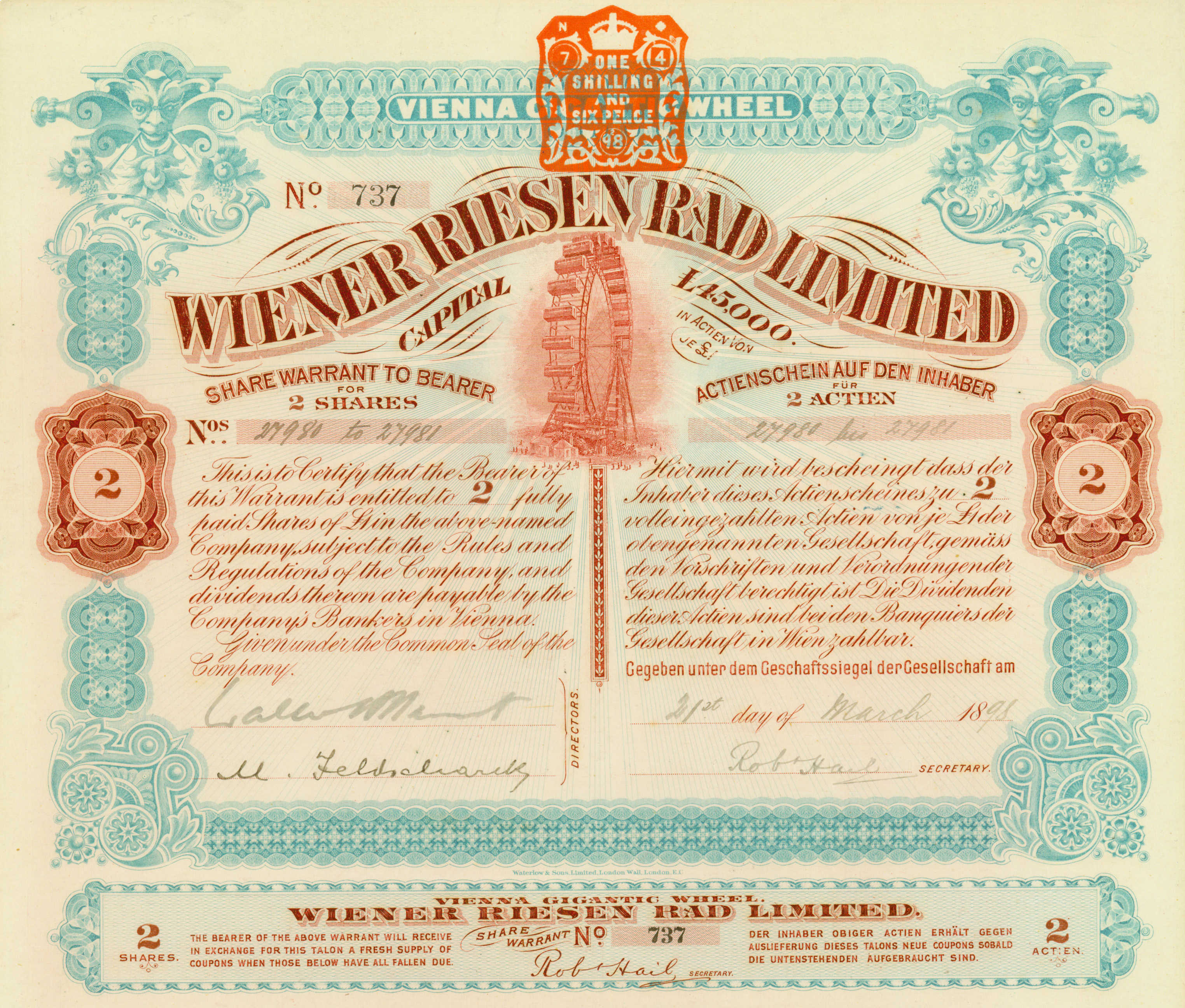
Share of the Wiener Riesen Rad Ltd., issued 21. March 1898

The Wiener Riesenrad was designed by the British engineers Harry Hitchins and Hubert Cecil Booth and constructed in 1897 by the English engineer Lieutenant Walter Basset Bassett (1864-1907), Royal Navy, son of Charles Bassett (1834-1908), MP, of Watermouth Castle, Devon. Its purpose was to celebrate the Golden Jubilee of Emperor Franz Josef I, and it was one of the earliest Ferris wheels ever built. Bassett's Ferris wheel manufacturing business was not a commercial success, and he died in 1907 almost bankrupt.

A permit for its demolition was issued in 1916, but because of a lack of funds with which to carry out the destruction, it survived.

It was built with 30 gondolas, but was severely damaged in World War II and when it was rebuilt only 15 gondolas were replaced.

The wheel is driven by a circumferential cable which leaves the wheel and passes through the drive mechanism under the base, and its spokes are steel cables, in tension.

The businessman Eduard Steiner owned the ferris wheel from 1920 until the Nazi regime seized it in 1938 as part of Nazi Austria's persecution of the Jews. Steiner was deported on 20 June 1942 to Theresienstadt and murdred in Auschwitz-Birkenau, with his wife on 18 June 1944.

== Height ==
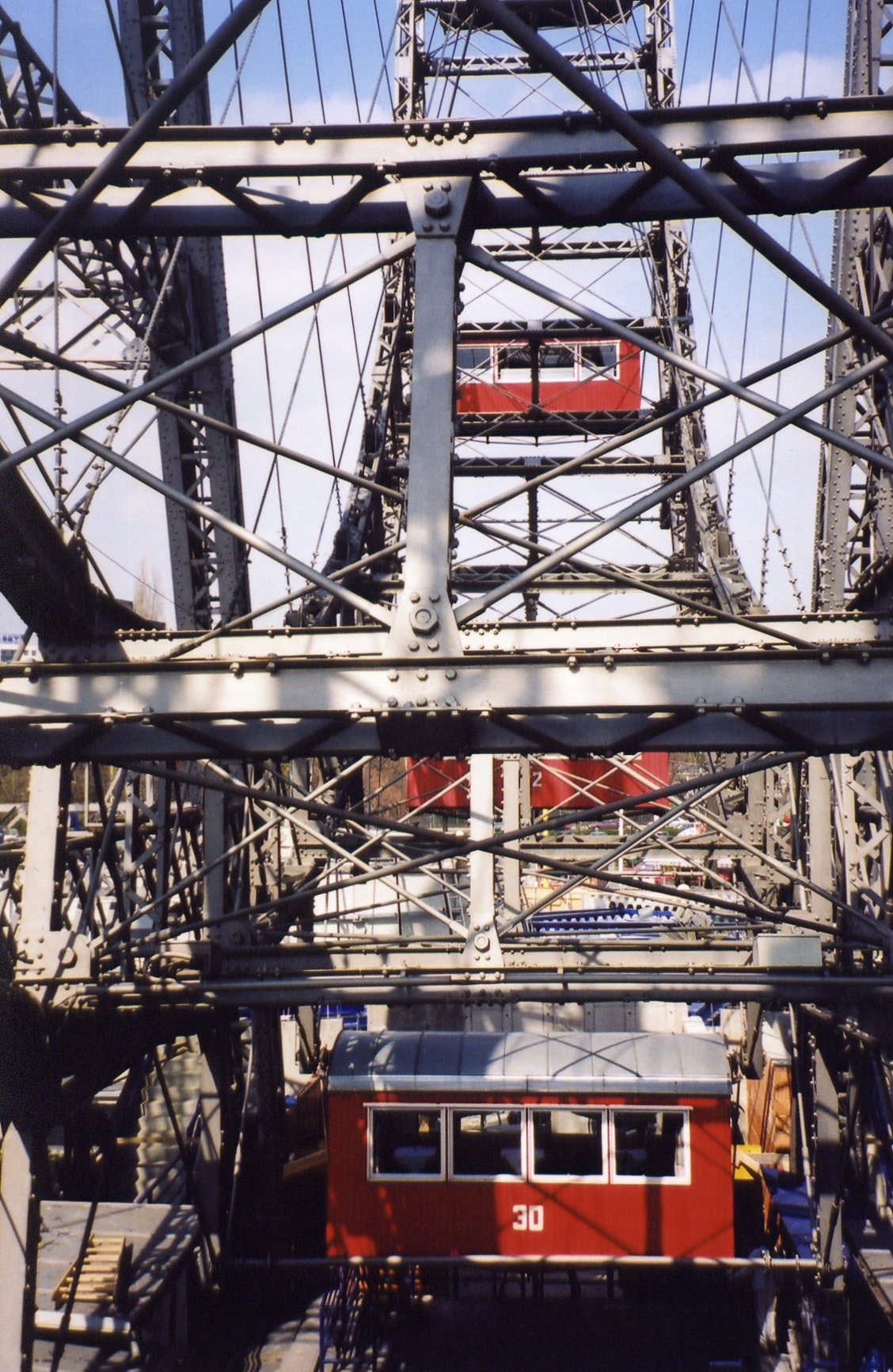

When the 64.75-metre (212 ft) tall Wiener Riesenrad was constructed in 1897, both the original 80.4-metre (264 ft) Ferris Wheel in the US (constructed 1893, demolished 1906) and the 94-metre (308 ft) Great Wheel in England (constructed 1895, demolished 1907) were taller. The 100-metre (328 ft) Grande Roue de Paris, constructed in 1900, was taller still. However, when the Grande Roue de Paris was demolished in 1920, the Riesenrad became the world's tallest extant Ferris wheel, and it remained so for the next 65 years, until the construction of the 85-metre (279 ft) Technostar in Japan in 1985.

== In popular culture ==
- The Riesenrad appeared in the post-World War II film noir The Third Man (1949)
- The wheel is featured in the 1973 spy thriller Scorpio (1973)
- The 1987 James Bond film, The Living Daylights features scenes throughout the Prater, around the wheel, and a lengthy romantic scene on the wheel.
- The wheel appears in the novel The Star of Kazan by Eva Ibbotson
- The wheel appears in Max Ophüls' Letter from an Unknown Woman (1948).
- Scenes in Richard Linklater's Before Sunrise (1995) were filmed around the Prater and on the wheel.
- The wheel appears in The Glass Room by Simon Mawer.
- The wheel appears in episodes 38, 39 and 50 of the anime Ashita no Nadja (2003 – 2004).
- The Riesenrad appears in the film Woman in Gold (2015), about the repatriation of a Klimt portrait stolen by the Nazis from a Jewish Viennese family.
- The wheel appears in Kommissar Rex the Austrian television series
- Winter City in Burnout 3: Takedown is based on Vienna and includes the Riesenrad.
- The wheel is featured in the US Hallmark Channel movie Christmas in Vienna.
- In the second season of the NBC TV Show Grimm, Episode 21 "the Waking Dead", the wheel is in the background of one scene.
- The wheel appears in episode 1 of the TV series Vienna Blood (2019) The Last Seance
- In the 2022 film Sachertorte, the main characters take a ride on the wheel.

== See also ==
The Holocaust in Austria

Anschluss

Aryanization

Preceded by Grande Roue de Paris	World's tallest extant Ferris wheel 1920-1985	Succeeded by Technocosmos
