= London to Brighton =

2006 British crime drama thriller film by Paul Andrew Williams

- Directed by: Paul Andrew Williams
- Written by: Paul Andrew Williams
- Produced by: Alastair Clark; Rachel Robey; Ken Marshall; Paul Andrew Williams
- Starring: Lorraine Stanley; Georgia Groome; Johnny Harris; Sam Spruell; Chloe Bale; Alexander Morton
- Cinematography: Christopher Ross
- Edited by: Tom Hemmings
- Music by: Laura Rossi
- Production companies: Wellington Films; Steel Mill Pictures; UK Film Council
- Distributed by: Vertigo Films
- Release date: 1 December 2006 (United Kingdom)
- Running time: 85 mins
- Country: United Kingdom
- Language: English
- Budget: $639,200
- Box office: $449,700

London to Brighton is a 2006 British neo-noir crime film written and directed by Paul Andrew Williams. It received mixed reviews and was a box office failure, grossing $449,700 on a budget of $639,200.

== Plot ==
A woman and child, Kelly and Joanne, burst into a London toilet stall. Joanne is crying and Kelly has a black eye. Eventually Kelly gets them on a train to Brighton, and it is clear they are running from someone.

Joanne is an eleven-year-old runaway who is procured by a reluctant Kelly into having sex with an old violent mobster who is a paedophile. Kelly's pimp, Derek, bullies her into complying, but it all goes horribly wrong, and the old mobster is killed, presumably by one of the girls. The older man's son, Stuart, then forces Derek to find the girls. The film follows the duo's flight from London in the wake of what has happened.

Arriving initially in Brighton, Kelly visits her friend Karen and tries to earn enough money through prostituting herself to help Joanne afford the train to Devon, where the child's grandmother lives. The two are eventually tracked down by her pimp and his associate and taken to meet Stuart at a secluded field. Upon arrival, Kelly's pimp and associate are made to dig two graves, presumably for the girls. However, Stuart decides that the girls are the victims in this episode and decides instead to kill Kelly's pimp and associate. The film ends with Kelly and Joanne arriving at Joanne's grandma's house in Devon. Kelly watches from a distance as the girl and the grandmother hug, then turns away.

== Cast ==
- Lorraine Stanley as Kelly
- Georgia Groome as Joanne
- Sam Spruell as Stuart Allen
- Alexander Morton as Duncan Allen
- Johnny Harris as Derek
- Chloe Bale as Karen
- Claudie Blakley as Tracey
- Nathan Constance as Chum

== Reception ==
=== Box office ===
The film's box office earnings grossed $449,700, with $6,700 in its opening weekend of U.S. & Canada of 10 February 2008.

=== Critical response ===
The film received generally positive reviews from critics for its performances, atmosphere and storyline, though its pacing, dark tone and ending had more mixed response. The review aggregator website Rotten Tomatoes reports that the film has a 72% approval rating, based on 29 reviews. The website's consensus reads, "With its grimy sets, taut storyline, and relentless sense of doom, London to Brighton is an auspicious directorial debut by Paul Andrew Williams." Metacritic reports that the film has an average score of 55 out of 100, based on seven critics, indicating "mixed or average reviews".

== Accolades ==
The film won a British Independent Film Award for Best Achievement in Production. Williams won the Golden Hitchcock award at the Dinard Festival of British Cinema, the New Director's Award at the Edinburgh International Film Festival, Best Feature Film at the Foyle Film Festival, and a Jury Prize at the Raindance Film Festival.

== See also ==
- Vidiyum Munn, a 2013 Indian film inspired by London to Brighton
