= The Star of Kazan =

2004 novel by Eva Ibbotson

- First edition cover
- Author: Eva Ibbotson
- Language: English
- Genre: Children
- Publisher: Macmillan
- Publication date: 2 July 2004
- Publication place: United Kingdom
- Pages: 388
- ISBN: 978-1-4050-5002-9
- OCLC: 156782900

The Star of Kazan is a 2004 novel by Eva Ibbotson.

It won the Nestlé Children's Book Prize Silver Award and was shortlisted for the Carnegie Medal.

== Setting ==
The story takes place over a year in the Austro-Hungarian and German empires in the early 20th century. Certain events are discussed, however, that are set in the late 19th century or other parts of Europe. Though the story is fictional, some people and events from actual history are discussed (such as Emperor Franz-Josef and the founding of the German empire). The author, with ancestry from Vienna herself, dedicates the second chapter of the book to discussing life there at that time.

== Plot summary ==
Ellie and Sigrid are the cook and housemaid to three professors in Vienna. On their day off, they discover a newborn baby girl left behind in a church of the alpine village of Pettelsdorf. With the infant is a note asking for her to be taken to a nunnery in Vienna, but when Ellie and Sigrid find that the nunnery is in quarantine for typhus, they decide to take the baby home and raise her as their own. They name her Annika after Ellie's mother and decide not to give her away after the typhus quarantine is over.

Twelve years later, in 1908, Annika is attending a local school whilst helping the adult maids with the day-to-day duties of running the household. She has befriended the granddaughter of a bookshop owner, Pauline, and the poor son of a washerwoman, Stefan. She celebrates her 'Found Day', the anniversary of her discovery in the church, by attending a Lipizzaner horse show at Vienna's Spanish Riding School. Though Annika is content, she fantasises about her birth mother.

The Eggharts, a wealthy family who live near Annika, begin to care for a dying relative. Loremarie Egghart, the snobbish daughter of Herr Egghart, offers Annika money to read to her great-aunt, and soon Annika learns that she was once a famous theatre personality who was called 'La Rondine' and received expensive gifts from her audiences, including a Russian emerald called the Star of Kazan. La Rondine would ascend a swing and strew flowers over the audience, but after marrying a poor painter who died young, La Rondine could not find work and was forced to sell her jewels. The jeweler, a hunchbacked man, gifted La Rondine with paste jewelry copies of the jewelry, and La Rondine bequeathes them to Annika when she dies soon after.

When the beautiful Frau Edeltraut von Tannenberg comes to the professors' house, she announces that she is Annika's long-lost birth mother. She explains that she abandoned Annika because she had eloped with a man who abandoned her after a week. Edeltraut takes Annika to Spittal, the family's estate in Germany, where Annika meets her uncle Oswald and her imperious half-brother Hermann. Spittal is gloomy and derelict, and much of the furniture has been sold and the staff reduced to an elderly maid and a Roma boy named Zed. Zed cares for Hermann's horse, Rocco, and Annika befriends him against the approval of her aristocratic family. She begins to dislike Hermann, who abuses both Rocco and Zed's dog, Hector, to whom he tied firecrackers that permanently injured him.

Edeltraut persuades Annika to sign a lengthy contract before leaving for Zurich. In actuality, Annika has signed over La Rondine's jewels, including the Star of Kazan. When Edeltraut returns, she is dressed extravagantly and gives gifts to her family, including galoshes for Annika that are a size too small. She claims that her godfather has died and bequeathed a large sum of money to her, which in fact she has sold some of La Rondine's jewels.

Annika's mother asks her to sign some important documents without really explaining them, and then goes to Zurich. Annika has actually signed over La Rondine's jewels, including her famous Star of Kazan, but is unaware of what she has done. When her mother comes back, she says a relative died and left them much money, but in fact she sold some of Annika's jewels so Hermann can go to the army school that he wants to attend, and Annika can have galoshes, which her mother buys a size too small.

One day, while Annika is walking with Zed by the lake, Hector retrieves a remnant of La Rondine's trunk. There is no sign of the jewels. Upon asking Edeltraut of the trunk's mysterious appearance, she retorts that Zed must have stolen it. Afraid of being arrested, Zed flees Spittal with Rocco and arrives in Vienna to tell the professors his suspicions about Annika's mother.

Annika is then sent away to a harsh finishing school, Grossenfluss. When the professors, Ellie, and Stefan discover that a pupil died by suicide they plot Annika's escape, successfully taking her back to Vienna. However, Edeltraut soon returns, and Annika insists on returning to Spittal with her birth mother. Pauline, upset from the proceedings, decides to spend her time on her hobby of collecting news articles of heroic deeds, but spots a piece stating that the lawyer who signed the birth certificate that Frau Edeltraut had of Annika's was jailed for fraud. This spurs Pauline to visit the midwife in Pettelsdorf, only to discover that the women had a stroke twenty years beforehand and can only sign her name. With this knowledge Pauline returns to Vienna and informs everyone about the forgery of the birth certificate. By this time, Annika is already on the boat with Frau Edeltraut and about to set off on the voyage, but fortunately Herr Egghart has arrived in his motor car, and they speed to the river Danube. They manage to alert Annika and inform her that Frau Edeltraut is not her mother, which Annika instantly acknowledges and jumps into the river to evade her.

With Frau Edeltraut discredited, Annika splits the wealth of the jewel sales with the Eggharts and proceeds to live a content life with her friends, Zed, and the professors and Sigrid and Ellie, whom she now recognises as her mother. Annika reveals a letter she found in Spittal, written by Edeltraut's father before he died, that declares Zed the rightful owner of Rocco, who is in turn determined to be a Lipizzaner. Zed becomes a rider in the Spanish Riding School, and Annika pays for Stefan's tutelage to become an engineer.

In Spittal, Edeltraut is left alone. Hermann returns from his military boarding school after being expelled for cowardice, and announces his desire to leave Germany and become a painter in Paris.

On her next Found Day, Annika takes her friends and family to the Riesenrad, where she scatters flowers from its zenith in memory of La Rondine.

== Characters ==
Some of the main characters are: Professor Emil, Professor Gertrude, Professor Julius, Zed, Stefan, Pauline, Gudrun, Loremarie, Hermann, Rocco, Edeltraut von Tannenberg, and of course Annika.

=== Annika ===
Annika is the protagonist of the story. A foundling, she is found and taken in by Sigrid and Ellie. She has a real talent for cooking, and she is very trusting.

=== Zedekiah (Zed) ===
Zed is a friendly Roma boy who works for Edeltraut von Tannenberg. He is the son of a Romani horse dealer. His mother is dead and his father died trying to stop a fight when Zed was very little. Edeltraut von Tannenberg's father, and the master at the time, had ordered a horse from Zed's father before the father’s death so when the horse was delivered, Zed came with it. The master gave Zed a job, and sent him to school. The horse, Rocco, was bought for the master's grandson, Hermann, but always preferred Zed, so the Master decided to get his grandson another horse and just before he had his stroke he left the horse to him.

=== Ellie ===
Ellie has worked for the professors as their cook since she was 14 years old. She is a very good cook like her mother and grandmother before her. Ellie often goes on walks in the countryside with Sigrid on their days off from work.

=== Sigrid ===
Sigrid works for the professors as a housemaid. She works well, but can be a little 'snappy' at times. Sigrid is very good friends with Ellie and is a hardworking role model for Annika.

=== The Professors ===
The professors are all siblings and have lived in the same house all their lives. None of them are married and are unlikely to be any time soon.

Professor Gertrude is the youngest and the only woman. She plays the harp and always smells of lavender water. She has cold feet and needs a hot water bottle to sleep. She is sometimes very anxious, doesn't smile much, and always has bits of food on her skirt.

Professor Emil is the middle child. He has a "sensitive stomach" and cannot cope with spicy foods. He is an art expert and is able to tell who painted a picture by looking at the feet of its main subjects.

Professor Julius, who specialises in geology, is the eldest. He was once engaged but his bride died before they could be wed. He has a picture of her in his room and has Annika pick out and arrange flowers in front of the picture every Saturday morning.

=== Stefan ===
Stefan Bodek is the son of a poor washerwoman. His father is a groundsman in the Prater. He is the third of six brothers and the strongest. He wants to be an engineer but fears that he can't afford to study.

=== Pauline ===
Pauline is Annika and Stefan's friend who lives with her grandfather and helps him look after his bookshop. She is a thin girl with frizzy black hair. She loves reading books and keeps a book with newspaper clippings about heroic people. She has agoraphobia.

=== Edeltraut von Tannenberg ===
Frau Edeltraut von Tannenberg comes forward as Annika's mother. Edeltraut has one sister, whose husband helps Edeltraut steal Annika's jewels. Edeltraut’s husband gambles away all their money and flees to America, leaving Edeltraut to take care of their son, Hermann, and the family estate until Hermann comes of age.

=== Hermann ===
Hermann is Edeltraut's son, and heir to the family estate. He is a couple of years younger than Annika and obsessed with all things marshal. Hoping for a future military career, he follows the timetable of the officer school he dreams of attending each day.

=== Loremarie ===
Loremarie is a snobby little girl whose father is very rich. She never really cared for her great-aunt, known in the theater as La Rondine.

=== Hector ===
Hector is a water spaniel who was bought for Hermann by his grandfather. Zed told Annika that Hermann wanted to train Hector to be an army dog and to not be scared of guns of explosions, so Hermann tied firecrackers onto Hector's leg and tail. Hector was blinded in one eye and lost one of his legs and most of his tail because of this. Edeltraut wanted Hector put down but Zed saved him. Hector is described by Zed as being able to swim like a fish even with only three legs. Hector likes to collect items from the lake, including his favorite sock suspender.

=== Rocco ===
Rocco is a gentle, quarter-Lipizzaner breed bay-coloured horse belonging to Zed. Although the Master bought him originally for Hermann, he changed his mind and left Rocco to Zed shortly before having a stroke.

=== La Rondine ===
La Rondine is the Loremarie's great-aunt. Annika used to read to her because Loremarie was disgusted by her. La Rondine told Annika about her life and how she used to be a great actress. She had a chest of jewels she thought to be fake, and as she died without knowing that they were real, she bequeathed them to Annika in her will.
