= The Great Ghost Rescue =

1975 children's novel by Eva Ibbotson

- First edition
- Author: Eva Ibbotson
- Cover artist: Simon Stern
- Language: English
- Genre: Children's novel
- Publisher: Macmillan Children's Books
- Publication date: 1975
- Publication place: United Kingdom
- Media type: Print (Paperback & Hardback)
- Pages: 160
- ISBN: 0-330-39828-8
- OCLC: 59531859

The Great Ghost Rescue is a children's novel authored by Eva Ibbotson. It was published by Macmillan in 1975 and was Ibbotson's first published novel. The story deals with a ghost called Humphrey the Horrible.

A film adaptation of the novel debuted in 2011.

== Plot ==
Humphrey the Horrible is a friendly ghost - quite unlike his frightful family: his mother, a Hag; his father, a Scottish ghost; his brother George, a screaming skull; and his sister, Winifred, a wailing ghost.

The ghost family are turned out of their castle home when humans plan to redevelop the castle into a holiday resort. They travel across England, accompanied by their headless Aunt Hortensia and their pet Shuk, and come to Norton Castle School, mistaking it for an empty castle. Here, they meet Rick, a student quite unafraid of ghosts. Rick plans to take the ghosts to the Prime Minister for peace talks concerning the large numbers of ghosts being turned out of their homes.

The ghosts and Rick head to London, and pick up an assortment of hangers-on along the way: Walter the Wet, a ghost haunting a polluted river; Cousin Susie and her vampire bat brood; and the Mad Monk, whose church was destroyed to make way for a motorway.

In London, Rick seeks out his member of parliament, Clarence Wilks, but the ignorant politician dismisses Rick's story as a fanciful pretense. Rick and the ghosts, furious at Wilks' disbelief, haunt his house and ruin a dinner party with several prominent guests. Wilks takes the ghosts to meet with the Prime Minister in exchange for leaving him be.

The Prime Minister is shaken though sensible, and cannot promise the ghosts land for their own. However, Lord Bullhaven, present throughout the whole conversation, allows the ghosts to settle in his land in northern Scotland, a place called Insleyfarne. The ghosts are thrilled, and settle in there. Rick returns to Norton Castle School, saddened to leave his friends behind.

Lord Bullhaven, however, is revealed to be "the sort of person who couldn't bear anything to be even the least bit unusual or out of the ordinary", and had gathered the ghosts of England at Insleyfarne to exorcise them. He recruits several clergymen and takes them to Insleyfarne in a bid to exorcise the ghosts. Humphrey manages to escape and, weakened, travels to Norton Castle School to warn Rick. Rick, his friend Barbara (daughter of the school cook) and new boy Peter Thorne, travel to Insleyfarne by plane to save the ghosts. They are helped by Mr Wallance, one of the clergymen who agreed to exorcise the ghosts for enough money to feed his starving family, but regrets his decision to help Bullhaven. Rick, Barbara and Peter find the Hag, close to "death", and she instructs them on supernatural remedies to save the other ghosts, such as saying Latin curses backwards and using dried wormwood to cure the Shuk's tail.

The ghosts hold a party to celebrate their survival and victory over Bullhaven. They rename Humphrey "HUMPHREY THE HEROIC" and pronounce Rick as "RICK THE RESCUER". The party is interrupted by Bullhaven, who in his anger, has crashed his car into a stone wall and killed himself, only to come back as a ghost. Rick implores the other ghosts to offer him sanctuary.

Rick, Barbara and Peter return to their school and Rick is thoughtful and quiet. Barbara tells him about the plight of the polar bears about Alaska, and Rick begins forming plans for yet another adventure.

== Reception ==
Critics praised the book for its humorous take on ghosts and apparitions, as well as the wit present in the writing. Most of them, which reviewed the 2002 release, called the story contrived, criticizing some its "narrative liberties" to keep its pace, with Janice Del Negro, writing for the Bulletin of the Center for Children's Books, saying The Great Ghost Rescue lacks the cohesion present in Ibbotson's Dial-a-Ghost, a companion novel originally released in 1996.

Stephen Krensky, for the New York Times praised the original book for its charming and witty characters, calling them "a welcome change from the perennial chain-rattling spooks." Krensky criticized the illustrations by Giulio Maestro in the American version, which were "careless and uninspired Halloween caricatures", not meshing well with the characters themselves.
