= Anna Gmeyner =

Austrian-born Jewish writer, playwright, and screenwriter (1902–1991)

- Born: Anna Wilhelmine Gmeyner; 16 March 1902; Vienna, Austria-Hungary
- Died: 3 January 1991 (aged 88); York, England
- Occupation: Writer
- Spouse(s): Bertold Wiesner (1925–1928; divorced); Jascha Morduch (1935–1950; deceased)
- Children: Eva Ibbotson (born Maria Wiesner)
- Writing career
- Pen name: Anna Reiner, Anna Morduch
- Period: 1929-1970
- Genres: Exile literature, drama
- Notable work: Manja

Anna Wilhelmine Gmeyner (16 March 1902 – 3 January 1991) was an Austrian-born Jewish writer, playwright, and screenwriter who was exiled from Germany and Austria, best known for her novel Manja (1938). She also wrote under the names Anna Reiner and Anna Morduch. Her daughter was the children's writer Eva Ibbotson.

== Early life ==
Anna Gmeyner was born to liberal Jewish parents in Vienna, where her father Rudolf Gmeyner was a lawyer. She grew up in a sophisticated and intellectual household, and her parents counted Sigmund Freud among their friends. Having studied in Vienna from 1920, Gmeyner moved to Berlin in 1925. She married Bertold Wiesner, a controversial physician who pioneered human infertility treatment, and who was revealed to have been the biological father of as many as one thousand of the children his wife's medical practice in London helped to be conceived. Their only child, Eva (born Maria Charlotte Michell Wiesner), was born shortly before the move. The family relocated to Scotland in 1928 after Wiesner was offered a job at the University of Edinburgh, it was during this time that Gmeyner gathered inspiration for her play about the Scottish miners' strike.

Gmeyner and Wiesner separated in 1928. Gmeyner returned to Berlin, where she became a playwright, poet, and librettist. She worked with Bertolt Brecht, wrote film scripts for G. W. Pabst, and wrote lyrics for Hanns Eisler. Her first theatrical works were a children's play called The Great and Little Claus and a critically acclaimed drama about the miners' strike in Scotland.

== Life in exile ==
The Nazis' rise to power prompted Gmeyner to flee Berlin, where her work was banned by Hitler. She traveled to Russia to make a film with Eisenstein that was never completed. At the end of 1932, she moved to Paris and worked on a film adaptation of Don Quixote with Pabst, who had also fled Germany. Gmeyner housed many fellow refugee artists in her small Paris flat. It was here that Gmeyner met her second husband, the Russian-Jewish philosopher Jascha Morduch, who lived in the flat below hers.

In 1935, the couple arrived in England as refugees, where Gmeyner began the exile literature for which she became known. She lived with her husband and her daughter Eva in Belsize Park, a period of Gmeyner's life later evoked by Eva Ibbotson in the novel The Morning Gift.

Gmeyner wrote Manja in 1938. The novel spans from the years 1920-1933, drawing on Gmeyner's experiences in the Weimar Republic. It was published in 1938 by Querido Verlag in Amsterdam, using the pseudonym Anna Reiner to protect Gmeyner's family in Austria. An English translation was published in 1939, retitled The Wall in the UK and Five Destinies in the US. A new English translation was published by Persephone Books in 2003, under Gmeyner's real name and restoring the original title, with a preface by Eva Ibbotson.

Between 1940 and 1950, Gmeyner and her husband lived in Berkshire. Jascha Morduch died in 1950, and Gmeyner began writing again under the name Anna Morduch, publishing biographies, religious stories, and poetry, as well as novels.

Anna Gmeyner died in York, England in 1991 at the age of 88.

== Bibliography ==
- Manja: a novel about five children. Amsterdam: Querido Verlag. 1938. Re-issued by Persephone Books in 2003, translated by Kate Phillips, with a preface by Gmeyner's daughter Eva Ibbotson.
- The Wall. Translated by Philip Owens. London: Secker & Warburg. 1939.
- Café du Dôme. Translated by Trevor & Phyllis Blewitt. London: Hamish Hamilton. 1941.
- The Death and Life of Julian, etc. London: Regency Press. 1960.
- A Jar laden with Water (six stories). London: Peter Davies. 1961.
- No Screen for the Dying. London: Regency Press. 1965.
- The Sovereign Adventure: the Grail of mankind. Cambridge: James Clark. 1970.
- Gmeyner, Anna; Hammel, Selma Kahn; Hammel, A.; Weiss-Sussex, G. (2009), Idealized and Demonized: Representations of Jewish Motherhood, pp. 95–112
