= The Great Ghost Rescue (film) =

- Film poster
- Directed by: Yann Samuell
- Written by: Yann Samuell; David Solomons
- Based on: The Great Ghost Rescue by Eva Ibbotson
- Produced by: Martin Katz; Norman Merry; Miriam Segal
- Starring: Emma Fielding; Georgia Groome
- Cinematography: Antoine Roch
- Music by: Mark Sayfritz
- Release date: 4 October 2011
- Running time: 89 minutes
- Country: United Kingdom
- Language: English

The Great Ghost Rescue is a 2011 British fantasy horror family film directed by Yann Samuell and starring Emma Fielding and Georgia Groome. The film is based on Eva Ibbotson's 1975 novel of the same name.

== Plot ==
A family of ghosts from different eras seek out a new home. However, times have changed and they are now threatened by ghost hunters. It is up to a small boy ghost to save his family.

== Cast ==
- Jason Isaacs as Narrator (voice)
- Emma Fielding as Mabel
- Georgia Groome as Winifred
- Toby Hall as Humphrey
- Otto Farrant as Barnabus
- Stephen Churchett as The Head Master
- Kevin McKidd as Hamish
- Bob Goody as Master Wraith
- David Schaal as Builder
- Bill Ward as Lord Alfred Seymour
- Anthony Head as Prime Minister
- Steven Mackintosh as Brad/Barnabus
- Ben Forster as Mr. Burnley
- Akbar Kurtha as Doctor
- Christian Contreras as Antonius
- Tracy-Ann Oberman as Mrs. Burnley
- Sidney Cole as Wild Eyed Ghost
- San Shella as Ghost Remover
- Rosemary Leach as The Queen
- Ross McCormack as Dan Burnley
- Niamh Webb as Carol Burnley
- Daren Elliott Holmes as Complaining Father
