= A Glove Shop in Vienna: And Other Stories =

1984 short story collection by Eva Ibbotson

- First edition
- Author: Eva Ibbotson
- Language: English
- Genre: Young adult short stories
- Publisher: Century Publishing
- Publication date: 1984
- Publication place: United Kingdom
- ISBN: 9780712604673

A Glove Shop in Vienna: And Other Stories is a collection of short stories for young adults by Eva Ibbotson. The book was first published in 1984 by Century Publishing. The short stories take place in many different locations, including Vienna, the Amazon, Russia and Paris.

The collection received mixed reviews for its 1992 release, with critics calling it well-written and with some surprising ends, but overly sweet and romantic.

== Publishing history ==
- A Glove Shop in Vienna: And Other Stories (1st U.K. ed.). London: Century Publishing. 1984. ISBN 9780712604673.
- A Glove Shop in Vienna and Other Stories (1st U.S. ed.). New York: St. Martin's Press. 1992. ISBN 978-0-312-06983-4.
- A Glove Shop in Vienna and Other Stories. Pan Macmillan. 22 May 2014. ISBN 9781447266525.

== Reception ==
Reviewing the 1992 version of the book, Kirkus Reviews called the stories present in the collection "mainly frivolous and as contrived as a decorative petit four," with a style reminiscent of the short stories found in magazines of the 1920s and 1930s. The reviewer praised two stories in particular, which are focused more on comedy, and concluded by calling the book "[s]light, scented, and deliciously dated in style".

Publishers Weekly praised the surprise endings of the short stories, although calling some of them "sadly contrived". They also noted these Ibbotson's short stories are "oversweet and ultimately cloying." Ellen Cohen praised the short stories by Ibbotson, calling her writing charming.
