= The Secret of Platform 13 =

1994 novel by Eva Ibbotson with illustrations by Sue Porter

- Author: Eva Ibbotson
- Illustrator: Sue Porter
- Genre: Children's novel
- Published: March 25, 1994
- Publisher: Puffin 9780141311920
- Pages: 231
- ISBN: 9780141311920

The Secret of Platform 13 is a children's novel by Eva Ibbotson, and illustrated by Sue Porter, first published in 1994. The book has gained extra significance as many readers find it similar to the Harry Potter series by J.K. Rowling.

== Summary ==
Platform 13 of King's Cross Station in London has been closed for years. Changes to the platform always result in failure for mysterious reasons. The reason is that the platform hides a gump, described as an "opening that opens once every nine years for nine days". The gump leads to the Island, a wonderful mythical paradise filled with both normal and magical creatures such as giants, mermaids, water nymphs, wizards, witches, hags and merrows, people who married mermaids/mermen.

Shortly before the gump opens, the Queen gives birth to a baby boy. The three nurses for the baby Prince are overcome with their homesickness for the land where they grew up and wish to visit London when the gump reopens. They are given permission to do so and bring the Prince with them. On the ninth day, however, the three nurses go to a fish and chip shop but decide not to take the baby inside. Instead, one of the nurses sits outside with the baby while her two sisters buy fish and chips for three. In the garage nearby a woman called Mrs. Trottle, who is desperate for a child, is sitting in her car. After the nurse falls asleep on the bench, Mrs. Trottle steals and drives away with the baby prince, having placed a china doll in the place of the prince. Nanny Brown, who was Mrs. Trottle's nurse as a child, is horrified by the kidnapping. Mrs. Trottle threatens to call the police if Nanny dares to tell anyone and decides to name the baby "Raymond". She goes away to Switzerland for a year and pretends she has had the baby there. She is a preposterously rich woman who does not work; she claims her husband's income is five hundred thousand pounds a year.

Back at the Island, the three nurses only discover the prince is gone when it is too late and the gump has closed again. The King and Queen are heartbroken and for the next nine years the Island is in deepest mourning. To rescue the prince, the king and queen organise a group who will venture into London the next time the gump opens. The group consists of a giant, Hans (who was made invisible so he wouldn't stand out), a "slightly batty" fey, Gurkintrude, a wizard, Cornelius, better known as Cor, and a young hag named Odge, who joined because she was the same age as the prince would be and felt a sense of kinship to him as a result, and also brought a present. Odge feels she is a disappointment to her parents and therefore wants to do something big in life to make up for it. Her sisters are all impressive hags who have stripy feet, fingernails so long they can dig the garden with them, black hairs like piano wires coming out of their ears, and blue teeth. Odge is the seventh daughter of a seventh daughter, which is supposed to be special, but when Odge was born she is almost a perfectly ordinary person. Disappointed, Odge's mother did not name her any fearsome name, but Odge, because it rhymes with Splodge, (after Odge's aunt said she looked like "a small pink splodge") and hoped that Odge would improve as she got older. Odge does have one blue tooth, but it is a molar and right at the back of her mouth, and she has a very, very small bump on one foot which she thought was an extra toe for a while, but wasn't. Odge feels that her parents, especially her mother, can never get over just how different Odge is from all her sisters, especially her oldest sister, Fredegonda, who is the fiercest and hairiest of all her sisters.

When the gump opens, the rescuers are directed to the Trottle house by the ghosts that live in Platform 13. There they see Raymond Trottle, who has grown up to be fat, lazy, and very spoiled. He seems to rely on his telly, his computer games and his remote control cars. They also meet the household servant, a boy named Ben who was raised by Nanny Brown. Ben is the exact opposite of Raymond and immediately feels comfortable with the group and befriends Odge.

The group begins to observe Raymond and after some time arranges for him to meet them in the park where they arrange for various magical creatures to perform a show for him. Though Raymond is unimpressed by the magical performance, he is delighted to discover that he is really a prince and agrees to return to the Island. Odge tries to convince Ben to come to the Island as well, but he refuses as Nanny is very ill and in the hospital.

Raymond mysteriously vanishes the next day however, and the group discovers that he told Mrs. Trottle of the plan. Believing that strangers intended to kidnap her child, she took him into hiding at a fancy hotel with several bodyguards. The group hatch a plan to take Raymond back, but everything falls apart when Ben is knocked out and nearly killed by one of the bodyguards. Given the choice of taking Raymond or rescuing Ben, the group chooses to save Ben. Raymond is abducted later by a swarm of harpies that the king and queen send and is successfully brought to the Island.

Meanwhile, Nanny Brown has died and left behind a letter, in which she reveals Ben's true identity as the stolen baby, with Raymond actually having been born to Mrs. Trottle in Switzerland. Ben arrives through the gump with Odge shortly after Raymond and is instantly recognized by his parents and hailed as a prince. Raymond is hastily sent back through the gump and returned home, and Odge later accepts Ben’s invitation to live in the castle with him.

== Similarity to Harry Potter ==
The book has gained extra significance as many readers find it similar to the Harry Potter series by J.K. Rowling, as the first book of that series, Harry Potter and the Philosopher's Stone was published in 1997, three years after this book was published. (They both mention a platform on Kings Cross Station, in London, that leads to a different world.) As journalist Amanda Craig has written, "Ibbotson would seem to have at least as good a case for claiming plagiarism as the American author currently suing J. K. Rowling, but unlike her, Ibbotson says she would 'like to shake her by the hand. I think we all borrow from each other as writers.'"
