= The Haunting of Hiram C. Hopgood =

1987 novel by Eva Ibbotson

- First edition
- Author: Eva Ibbotson
- Language: English
- Genre: Children's novel
- Publisher: Pan Macmillan
- Publication date: 1987
- Publication place: United Kingdom
- Media type: Print (Hardcover)
- Pages: 160
- ISBN: 0-333-44510-4

The Haunting of Hiram C. Hopgood is a children's novel written in 1987 by Eva Ibbotson. The novel was published in the United States as The Haunting of Granite Falls.

The main characters are Alex and Helen, along with several ghosts. Other characters include Helen's father, the ghost of a hand and a sinister trio.
