= The Beasts of Clawstone Castle =

Book by Eva Ibbotson

- First edition
- Author: Eva Ibbotson
- Illustrator: Kevin Hawkes
- Language: English
- Genre: Children's fantasy
- Publisher: Macmillan
- Publication date: 2005 (UK)
- Publication place: United Kingdom
- Media type: Print (paperback)
- Pages: 243
- ISBN: 978-0-525-477198

The Beasts of Clawstone Castle is a 2005 children's fantasy book by Eva Ibbotson. The plot concerns the theft of wild cattle from a Scottish borders castle, and their recovery by children helped by friendly ghosts. The novel's setting was inspired by Chillingham Castle and the Chillingham Cattle in north Northumberland.

== Plot ==
Madlyn and Rollo live with their parents in a ground-floor flat in south London. Mrs Hamilton runs a theatre where the plays keep running out of money, and Mr Hamilton is a designer and helps people with their houses. Madlyn is very attractive and has many friends. She has fair hair, blue eyes and a deep laugh, and likes parties and sleepovers. Rollo is two years younger and likes animals and insects. He has an adopted skink at London Zoo called Stumpy. Madlyn is helpful to her brother and mother, who is usually frantic and forgets things like car keys.

At the beginning of the summer term, Mr Hamilton receives a large offer from an American college (which the family needs) to spend two months in New York setting up a business course in design. The parents cannot take the children but decide to go to America, sending Madlyn and Rollo to stay with their Uncle George and Aunt Emily (sister and brother) at Clawstone Castle on the Scottish border. Madlyn is shocked at Clawstone's appearance. When she meets her Uncle and Aunt she is uncertain.

George and his sister Emily wake early on Saturdays for that is when the castle is open to the public. George's hair is sparse and he wears a mustard-coloured tweed suit. Howard Percival, their cousin, is very shy, never comes out of his room, and is frightened of anyone he has not known for the last twenty years.

Mrs Grove comes in from the village to help. She disapproves of how George and Emily deal with Howard. Emily prepares the gift shop. She feels sad at the thought of the rival Trembellow gift shop, which is larger. George starts preparing his work in the castle. He also feels sad at the thought of the rival Trembellow dungeons.

Mrs Grove's sister comes to start taking the tickets, bringing with her what the villagers have donated to help the castle. The day does not go well; by midday only ten people have arrived, and most of them get bored.

The next day Madlyn and Rollo make friends with Mrs Grove and Madlyn takes to the museum. Rollo likes the dungeon. Then Madlyn meets Mrs Grove's son, Ned, and learns about Olive, the Trembellow's daughter. Madlyn and Rollo go to Mrs Grove's house to watch TV. When they get back Emily is preparing for Open Day again. Madlyn asks why the money is so important, and Mrs Grove tells her it's for the cows.

The next day Sir George takes Madlyn and Rollo to see his white cows. They are astonishing, and George buys Rollo a pair of binoculars. Madlyn, Rollo and Ned go see Howard, and that night Madlyn has an idea as to how they could make some more money on their Open Days. They have realised that cousin Howard is in fact a ghost (this is why he is so shy) and they ask him to try to find some scary ghosts to haunt the castle.

Brenda the bloodstained bride, Mr Smith the skeleton, Sir Ranoulf the man with a rat in his chest, Sunita the sawn-in-half girl, and a pair of disembodied feet all help to make the castle popular with tourists. However, when the cows are stolen by two men pretending to be vets, the children go to find out what happened.

Their search takes them to Blackscar Island, where an evil plastic surgeon has started a clinic where he changes ordinary animals into extinct or mythical animals using surgery. He plans to graft narwhal horns on the heads of the white cows, and sell them as unicorns.
