= The Abominables =

2012 children's novel by Eva Ibbotson

- First edition (publ. Marion Lloyd Books)
- Author: Eva Ibbotson
- Publisher: Amulet Books
- Publication date: 1 October 2013
- ISBN: 978-1-4197-0789-6

The Abominables is a children's novel by Austro-British children's writer Eva Ibbotson, published after her death, in 2012. According to WorldCat, the book is in 1,031 libraries as of November 2015.

Ibbotson probably wrote the novel in the 1994, and did not wish for it to be published because it was not the kind of ghost story she usually wrote. Following her death, her family chose to edit the book for publication, with her son Toby working with her prior editor.

== Plot ==
Lady Agatha, the daughter of an aristocratic explorer is kidnapped by yetis in 1912. She realises they are gentle, teaches them to speak, and cares for them. A hundred years pass, and Lady Agatha is still alive.

== Reception ==
Mal Peet, writing for The Guardian called the book "a hugely enjoyable and witty rollick", though remarked that Ibbotson's grief for her husband played a part in the novel's backstory. The Abominables also received favourable reviews from Kirkus Reviews and The Telegraph, where the reviewer called it "another gem" by Ibbotson.
