= The Dragonfly Pool =

2008 children's novel by Eva Ibbotson

- First edition
- Author: Eva Ibbotson
- Illustrator: Kevin Hawkes
- Language: English
- Subject: World war 2
- Genre: Fantasy
- Publisher: Macmillan
- Publication date: 2 May 2008
- Pages: 416
- ISBN: 0-525-42064-9

The Dragonfly Pool is a children's novel written by Austro-British children's writer Eva Ibbotson and illustrated by Kevin Hawkes.

In a foreword to the book, Ibbotson writes that the school featured in the novel is based on her own experience at Dartington Hall, a progressive school in Devon. The inspirational biology teacher, Matteo, is based on David Lack, the ornithologist, who did a lot of his early research on robins with the help of his pupils

== Plot ==
Talitha ('Tally') Hamilton is the daughter of the town's beloved doctor. Tally loves her life; she gets along with everyone. Following the outbreak of World War II, Tally is very upset to learn she will be sent to an English boarding school, Delderton, but does so at the request of her father. When Tally arrives at Delderton, she soon discovers that this school is like no other: the dancing teacher encourages them to be seeds busting into light, and the enigmatic biology teacher Matteo takes them for study walks at four in the morning. Tally soon settles in and makes plenty of friends, even organising a trip for her friends to attend a dancing festival in Bergania.

Meanwhile, Prince Karil of Bergania is a lonely boy who wants to be normal and have friends. He hates wearing stuffy suits and attending so many formal celebrations. When Karil meets Tally at the Dragonfly Pool, his place of comfort and peace, the two immediately become friends. But when Karil's father the King is assassinated, Karil is forced to flee with Tally and the others to England. The King's assassination is revealed to have been planned by the Germans, and they invade and overtake Bergania.

The group of dancers quickly disguise Karil as part of the team in order to protect him, and take him back to school with them. On their journey, they fight off numerous attempts to capture Karil, but manage to get away. When they eventually reach England, Karil is taken into the care of his grandfather.
