= Journey to the River Sea =

2001 novel by Eva Ibbotson

- Front cover of the first edition
- Author: Eva Ibbotson
- Illustrator: Gina Suter (UK); Kevin Hawkes (US, 2008); Sarah J. Coleman (UK, 2016); Katie Hickey (UK, 2022)
- Language: English
- Series: 13
- Genre: fiction/adventuresChildren's adventure novel
- Publisher: Macmillan Children's Books; E. P. Dutton (US)
- Publication date: 2001 (hardcover) 2002 (paperback) 2011 (10 year anniversary edition) 2014 2025 (paperback with updated cover) 2022 (paperback, fully illustrated)
- Publication place: United Kingdom
- Media type: Print (hardcover)
- Pages: 299
- ISBN: 0-333-94740-1 ISBN 0525467394 (US)
- LC Class: PZ7.I11555 Jo 2001a

Journey to the River Sea is an adventure novel written by Eva Ibbotson, published by MacMillan in 2001. It is set mainly in Manaus, Brazil, early in the 20th century and conveys the author's vision of the Amazon River.

It was a finalist for all of the major British children's literary awards (below), winning the Smarties Prize, ages 9–11, and garnering an unusual commendation as runner-up for the Guardian Award. Anne Fine, British Children's Laureate (2001-3) and one of three former winners on the Guardian panel, wrote that "we all fell on Eva Ibbotson's perfectly judged, brilliantly light to read, civilised Journey To The River Sea, in which we are shown how, as one of the characters Miss Minton reminds us, 'Children must lead big lives... if it is in them to do so. 'Oh, please let her write another book as fine as this, because, in any other year, we would have handed her the prize without a thought."

== Plot ==
The book opens in an exclusive London girls' school, The Mayfair Academy for Young Ladies. Maia, an orphan, is sent from this safe and cosy environment to stay with her distant relations in the Amazon, the Carters, who are not as kind as she had hoped for. The Carters do not embrace their surroundings and almost always stay indoors, except for trips to Manaus. Beatrice and Gwendolyn, the twin daughters, are selfish and seem to be brought up strictly to be British, while their father, the eccentric Mr Carter, obsessively collects the glass eyes of famous people. Living with the family is Miss Minton, governess to Maia and the twins, who, despite an outwardly strict appearance, begins to care deeply for Maia.

The family plans to see a play starring Clovis King, an English child actor, but the twins lie and say that all the tickets had sold out so they couldn't buy one for Maia. She decides to go anyway and secretly slips out of the Carters house to get there. When she gets lost, a Native boy takes her to the theatre on his boat. When Maia finally gets to watch Little Lord Fauntleroy, Clovis acts very well, but during the pivotal scene, his voice cracks and the play is ruined.

Later, Maia meets an orphaned half Xanti, half British boy called Finn Taverner and finds out that he was the boy who gave her a ride to Clovis's act. Two detectives, Mr. Trapwood and Mr. Low, whom Maia nicknames "the crows", are chasing him because his grandfather, Lord Aubrey Taverner, wants to find the heir of Westwood, the estate of the wealthy Taverner family. Finn doesn't want to go because of the terrible memories his father had of living in Westwood, and because he wants to travel up the Amazon to where the Xanti, the Native tribe to which his mother belonged, live. Afterward, Clovis meets Finn too and Finn suggests that they swap positions by making Clovis take the place of Finn. Clovis, also an orphan, desperately wants to go back to England, while Finn wants to stay in Brazil. Clovis will pretend to be Finn Taverner and become the heir to Westwood, while Finn will explore the "River Sea" (the name given to the Amazon River by locals).

The swapping is successful, and for a while, everything seems to be going fairly well. But then one day, Miss Minton disappears. She has plans to rescue Maia from the Carters by taking the place of Mademoiselle Lille, the governess to a Russian family, the Keminskys, Maia's friends Sergei and Olga and their parents, the Count and Countess Keminsky. However, Maia, who Miss Minton eventually plans to take with her, does not know this and believes that she has been abandoned. While she is gone, the twins accidentally start a fire in the Carters' home. Mrs. Carter, distracted by Beatrice and Gwendolyn's fighting, accidentally spills insect repellent onto the oil lamp, burning the twins' bedroom and finally the whole house. The Carters are sent to the hospital in the river ambulance, but Maia is left on her own. She is found by Finn and he takes her on his boat, the Arabella, to embark on the adventure she had hoped for.

Miss Minton and her friend, Professor Neville Glastonbury, chase after them by boat as well. They find the Xanti and for a short time, they live with them and are perfectly happy. One day, Maia is singing for the Xanti when the police from Manaus hear her voice and also find Miss Minton's corset, and, thinking they are rescuing Miss Minton, Maia, and the curator of the Natural History Museum, take them back to Manaus.

Meanwhile, in England, Clovis confesses that he is not the heir and wishes to go home, which causes Sir Aubrey to have a heart attack. Finn goes to Westwood to help Clovis, but Clovis tells him that he has since told Sir Aubrey that his confession was simply a joke. Finn is relieved as this means he can return to Brazil.

In the end, Mrs. Carter, Beatrice, and Gwendolyn return to England to become servants of their wealthy relative, Lady Parsons. Maia, Miss Minton, and Finn all return to Manaus and Clovis, under the assumed identity of Finn, is able to stay in England and becomes the heir to Westwood.

== Characters in Journey to The River Sea ==
=== Maia Fielding - An orphan (Main Character) ===
Maia is an orphan and the main character of the book. Bright, passionate, adventurous, determined, and resourceful, Maia has great ambition and a talent for music. She used to live and study in a boarding school in England, called "Mayfair Academy for Young Ladies"; all fees were subsidized by her parents' trust fund. Her parents have died and she journeys to the Amazon to live with her relatives, the Carters, who exploit, neglect, and abuse her, only keeping her under their roof for the sake of her parents' money. She grows close to her governess, Miss Minton. She also forms remarkably close bonds with both Clovis King and Finn Taverner, who are, if in different ways, in lonely and vulnerable situations similar to her own. Maia also meets many people such as professor Neville Glastonbury, Sergei, and Olga. Maia is excited and mystified by the unexplored Amazon and deeply cares about it once it becomes her home. She is a kind, bright person who is very adventurous and has a vibrant personality. She was excited to live in a jungle.

=== Clovis King or Jimmy Bates or Little Lord Fauntleroy ===
Clovis (Jimmy Bates, Clovis is his stage name) is an impoverished boy actor who dreams of going home to England to his foster mother(He especially wants to go back for the food). He has a mishap in Manaus and leaves the acting troupe to go to Maia in hopes her and her family takes him in. As that happens his acting troupe falls into debt and are arrested. Later, Clovis takes Finn's place as heir at Westwood in England, convincing detectives of the false identity. He is reunited with his foster mother who persuades him to reveal his true identity. Clovis tries to reveal his identity on several occasions—one of which results in disaster he can "have Maia when she's grown up." He ends the book living as the wealthy heir 'Finn Taverner'. Clovis is kind and afraid of many things. He is also thought to have a crush on Maia which is proven when he say in his head the twins are pretty but Maia was different.

=== Finn Taverner ===
Finn Taverner is the son of Bernard Taverner. Finn is the real heir of Westwood. Sir Aubrey sent the crows to find Finn, as he needed the son of Bernard Taverner to inherit Westwood. He is really adventurous and loves to spend time with the nature. He wants to become a doctor who used many natural medicines and herbal cures. His mother was part of the Xanti tribe, while his father, Bernard Taverner, was an Englishman. His main goal was to reach the Xanti, who live in the Amazon Rainforest. He was a true and good friend to Maia and Clovis. He had a boat named Arabella, on which he travelled and collected the medicinal plants of which he was so fond.

=== Bernard Taverner ===
Bernard Taverner is the third son of Sir Aubrey. After escaping from Westwood, he became a naturalist and lived in the Amazon. He had a brother named Dudley and a sister named Joan who are mean and cruel to him and others. He was once saved by the Xanti and married a girl called Yara from the tribe. He later had a son, Finn Taverner, and lived in Manaus with plenty of friends, such as the Indians, Professor Glastonberry, and many more people.

=== Mrs Carter ===
Mrs Carter is the twins' (Gwendolyn and Beatrice) mother and Mr Carter's wife. It is clear she only took Maia in for the money that came with her. She is greedy and demonstrates signs of increasing mental instability towards the end of the book. She doesn't spend money on Maia's needs, such as piano lessons. Instead, she uses it to buy clothes for herself and her daughters, along with a variety of insect repellents (she hates insects). She is in debt, and all the other families living in Manaus despise the Carters. When her house is set on fire, she goes to live with a distant relative, who turns Mrs. Carter into her personal maid.

=== Mr Carter ===
Mr Carter is the twins' father. He is in debt in Manaus and is wanted for fraud in England after embezzling the bank where he worked. He is shown to be manipulative and has an obsession with collecting famous peoples' glass eyes. At the end of the novel, he is sent to prison in the Amazon after failing to pay workers and loan sharks. He also gets taken to prison by Gonzales. Mr Carter is a very mysterious man; he doesn't really care for his family and spends all day in his messy office obsessing over his collection of eyeballs. He loves his collection of eyeballs to such an extent that when the Carters' home caught fire, he chose to retrieve his collection of eyes from his office instead of helping Maia from the burning house. When questioned by Miss Minton at the hospital, he claims that he tried to get to Maia's room, but the fire prevented him from reaching her.

=== Miss Arabella Minton ===
Miss Minton is the governess of Maia. She is reserved. She is introduced as a "tall, gaunt woman" wearing black clothing and frightening accessories such as a hatpin modelled after a Viking spear and a steel, beaked umbrella. She is kind and concerned with routine and proper learning, encouraging Maia to study Portuguese, for example, in the empty dining room of a ship caught in a storm, or asking Finn to continue his Latin studies whilst in the Amazon rainforest. She loves reading books, particularly Shakespeare. A close friend of Bernard Taverner, she is revealed to be the maid who helped him escape his abusive household and reach the Amazon when they were younger. This is realised as her friend named his boat after her: the "Arabella". Miss Minton takes the job with the Carters in order to follow her late friend's journey to the Amazon. She is extremely intelligent, having been revealed to have knowledge of all the plots the children concoct but allowing them to take place. She has a witty and dry sense of humour, and is cunning, using deception and acting in order to protect the children from unkind and corrupt individuals, such as the detectives. Miss Minton grows to love Maia and treats her like her own child. She finally manages to persuade Mr Murray to let her, and Maia live together in the Amazon. Furthermore, she seems to find romance with Doctor Glastonbury, a naturalist, and Bernard's close friend. He eventually proposes to her, but she is not certain of her suitability to marry.

=== Mr Trapwood and Mr Low ===
Mr Trapwood and Mr Low are two detectives who search for Finn (who is the legitimate heir) on behalf of Aubrey Taverner. They are greedy, hoping only for money in exchange for their work, and are clumsy and unkind in their attempts to discover the boy. Two unwittingly comedic individuals, Mr Trapwood being harsh and tall and Mr Low being short with a high pitched tone, they wear only black suits despite the weather. Whilst being led astray from their mission by residents of Manaus and the Amazonian Natives (all of whom despise them, being friends of Bernard and Finn Taverner), they befall a series of comedic misfortunes. Their racism towards the Natives is also their downfall, as they are mocked by the tribes, refuse to change out of British attire and therefore overheat, and are easily deceived by Finn's charade towards the end of the novel due to their irrational prejudices. They are often referred to as 'the crows'.

=== Miss Emily ===
Miss Emily taught Maia in her boarding school before she left for Brazil. Miss Emily is very close to her sister, Miss Banks, and has a very strong bond with her. She is a comforting presence for Maia and is in her 40s.

=== Professor Glastonberry ===
Professor Neville Glastonberry (The curator of the Manaus Museum) is friends with Bernard Traverner and Finn. He helps Maia with the swap of Finn and Clovis, and he helps Miss Minton find Maia. His wife died a few years ago. He is rather quiet and reserved but is very kind in heart. He is a kind hearted person who always helps Maia.

=== Sir Aubrey Taverner ===
Sir Aubrey Taverner is an true Englishman who lost his son, Dudley, who died on a horseback accident as he broke his neck. He was the owner of Westwood (now going to be inherited by Clovis staging as Finn.) and wants Finn to return to England and take his place as the heir to Westwood, the Taverner family estate. From descriptions, he represents the rigid expectations of tradition and duty.

== Awards ==
Journey to the River Sea won the Nestlé Smarties Book Prize for reader ages 9–11. It was identified as runner-up for the Guardian Children's Fiction Prize and it made the shortlist for the Carnegie Medal; the Whitbread Award, Children's Book; and the Blue Peter Book Award.
