= Which Witch? (novel) =

1979 children's novel by Eva Ibbotson

- First edition
- Author: Eva Ibbotson
- Language: English
- Genre: Children's novel
- Publisher: Macmillan
- Publication date: 1979
- Publication place: United Kingdom
- Media type: Print (hardcover, paperback)
- ISBN: 0330398008 (2001)
- OCLC: 48238135
- LC Class: PZ7.I11555 Wh 1999

Which Witch? is a children's novel by Eva Ibbotson published in 1979. The first U.S. edition was published by Dutton Children's Books on August 1, in 1999 with illustrations by Annabel Large. A paperback edition was later published by Viking on July 3, 2000.

== Plot ==
The story begins when a wizard named Arriman the Awful, living in Darkington Hall, decides to choose a wife from his hometown of Todcaster; his ulterior motive is a prophecy that foretells that another, darker wizard will take over Arriman's burden of smiting and blighting, which bores him by now. It is proposed by his servant that the prophecy must have meant Arriman's son. Since Arriman has no son, nor even a wife, he decides to hold a contest in which the seven witches of Todcaster (Mabel Wrack, Ethel Feedbag, Mother Bloodworth, Nancy Shouter, Nora Shouter, Madame Olympia, and Belladonna) are to take part that will decide whom he will marry: whichever witch performs the blackest act of magic will be his bride. However, most of the witches of Todcaster are downright revolting and nasty. The exception to this is Belladonna, who is beautiful and secretly loves Arriman, but is a white witch, unable to perform any black magic.

Before the contest begins, Belladonna encounters a small orphan named Terence Mugg. She helps rescue him from the orphanage and a mean matron by using an dark spell to root the matron. Believing that Terence's pet worm, Rover, is her familiar, an animal that is key to her working dark magic, she and Terence agree to work together to win the competition.

While the other witches' magic goes both hilariously and horribly wrong, when it is their turn in the competition there is one problem Belladonna did not count on. A truly evil enchantress, Madame Olympia joins the contest, and is willing to do anything to make sure she will win the hand of Arriman to gain his teeth for her necklace.

After spending time with Arriman, Terence discovers the perfect piece of magic for Belladonna to do: raise the ghost of Sir Simon Montpelier, Arriman's friend, which Arriman has been trying to do for years. Olympia, on her day, performs a terrifying piece of magic known as the "Symphony of Death." It seems that unless Belladonna can perform her necromancy, she will certainly lose.

However, the day before her turn, her familiar goes missing. Only Terence is aware, as Rover was with him at all times. Without telling Belladonna, Terence devises a plan with Arriman's servants, who all agree that Belladonna would be the best wife for Arriman. Terence goes into town to hire an actor to play Sir Simon. Belladonna performs as scheduled. After an amazing display, Sir Simon appears to everyone, alive. Arriman is overjoyed to see his friend.

One day after Belladonna's act, Terence goes missing. He is found back at his old orphanage. However, a message from the actor's mother reveals that he was unable to arrive on time for the performance, which jolts the plotters into the realization that Sir Simon has truly been resurrected. The same night, Terence goes to the kitchen for a drink when the matron catches him. Out of nowhere, he turns her into a spider, then returns to Darkington. It turns out that Rover was kidnapped by Madame Olympia. Arriman and his servants successfully return Rover to Belladonna, but it turns out that it was not Belladonna who completed the spell after all: it was Terence, who held Rover for all her performances and imitated her spell-casting. Delighted to have found his prophesied replacement, Arriman marries Belladonna and they take Terence in as Arriman's student and foster son.

== Reception ==
On the cover of the Dutton edition it states "Eva Ibbotson has assumed the magic of Roald Dahl" and that sentiment is echoed in the Kirkus review which mentions imagination, magic and humor.
