= Bertold Wiesner =

Austrian-born physiologist (1901–1972)

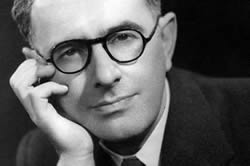
- Born: Bertold Paul Wiesner; 24 July 1901; Marchegg
- Died: 7 January 1972 (aged 70); London Borough of Ealing
- Resting place: East Finchley Cemetery
- Education: Doctor of Science
- Occupation: Lecturer, scientist
- Employer: Royal Northern Hospital
- Spouse(s): Anna Gmeyner, Mary Barton
- Children: Up to 600

Bertold Paul Wiesner FRSE (1901–1972) was an Austrian-born physiologist. He is noted for coining the term 'Psi' to denote parapsychological phenomena; for his research into human fertility and the diagnosis of pregnancy; and for being the biological father of more than 600 people by anonymously donating sperm used by his wife the obstetrician Mary Barton to perform artificial insemination on women at her private practice in London.

== First marriage and early work in Austria ==
Wiesner's PhD was awarded in 1923 with a dissertation about the autophoric transplantation of ovaries in rats.

He was briefly married to the Jewish Austrian author, playwright, and screenwriter Anna Gmeyner. They had one daughter: the author Eva Ibbotson, born in 1925. The family moved to Scotland in 1926 when Wiesner accepted a post at the University of Edinburgh. Wiesner and Gmeyner separated in 1928. He became a naturalised citizen in August 1934.

During 1926 while Wiesner was still in Austria, he began investigating the role of hormones in regulating fertility and their impact on fetal development. Wiesner also researched the possibility of preventing and terminating pregnancy by physiological means without mechanical intervention based on oral ingestion of manufactured substances containing hormones. He presented his first paper at the First International Congress for Sex Research organised by the psychiatrist Albert Moll in Berlin.

Two years later in 1927 the German gynecologists Bernhard Zondek and Selmar Ascheim discovered that the urine of a pregnant woman contained a substance later identified as the gonadotropic hormone human chorionic gonadotropin that caused an estrous reaction when injected into rats. This provided the basis for the Aschheim-Zondek test for pregnancy.

== Early work in Scotland ==
The following year in 1928, Wiesner was appointed to the position of head of Sex Physiology by animal geneticist Francis Crew, Professor of Animal Genetics at the newly established Institute of Animal Genetics (IAG) established within the University of Edinburgh.

A number of notable scientists conducted research at the IAG, including physiologist John Scott Haldane, zoologist Lancelot Hogben and evolutionary biologist Julian Huxley. It was there that Wiesner built upon the work of Zondek and Aschheim by examining the production and role of hormones during fertilisation and pregnancy. Zondek and Aschheim had thought that the hormone chorionic gonadotrophin was produced by the pituitary gland. But the research conducted at the IAG proved that it is secreted by the placenta.

In 1929, Wiesner visited Montreal, where he discussed with some scientists the possibility of using medicine derived from female hormones to delay menopause. Later, the scientists helped form the company Ayerst, McKenna and Harrison, Ltd (later, Wyeth) who marketed Premarin, a controversial hormone replacement therapy (HRT) drug based on pregnant mare's urine.

He was awarded his ScD in genetics in 1930.

== The Pregnancy Diagnosis Station ==
The work of Wiesner and Crew led to the establishment of the Pregnancy Diagnosis Station at Edinburgh, which by 1939 was conducting ten thousand pregnancy tests per year, serving physicians across the United Kingdom. In addition, Wiesner discovered that analysis of the urine provided by pregnant women could indicate the likelihood of miscarriage and abnormal fetal development.

== Artificial insemination research ==
While at the Institute of Animal Genetics, Wiesner resumed his earlier research into the prevention of pregnancy which contributed to the formulation of a reliable oral contraceptive for women. In addition, Wiesner collaborated with Kenneth Walker, a urological surgeon, at the Royal Northern Hospital where they had success in artificially inseminating women with sperm from anonymous donors in cases where the patient's husband was infertile or impotent.

While working as an obstetrician at the Royal Free Hospital in London during the early 1940s, Mary Barton had also had similar success and founded the first private clinic offering artificial insemination in the United Kingdom. In 1945, Barton collaborated with Wiesner and Walker on a paper for the British Medical Journal, describing their technique of human artificial insemination. The paper precipitated highly publicised condemnation from the Pope who called it a sin, and the Archbishop of Canterbury who called for the British parliament to make human artificial insemination illegal. Although it was not criminalised it was not legalised either and therefore the status of artificial insemination was ambiguous. Consequently, the activities of Barton and Wiesner at the fertility clinic were conducted in secrecy and all inseminated women were instructed to tell nobody about it.

== Collaboration and marriage to Mary Barton ==
Subsequently, Barton and Wiesner jointly managed Barton's practice in London, during which time they married and had a son, Jonathan, in 1945, and a daughter, Ruth. From the beginning of Barton's practice until Wiesner's retirement in the mid-late 1960s, Mary Barton successfully inseminated an estimated 1500 women, the majority with sperm provided from Wiesner, some 100-200 from neuroscientist Derek Richter, and an unknown number from unidentified donors. It is estimated that Wiesner is the biological father of around 600 children born following these procedures, although some believe this figure could be as high as 1000.

== Parapsychological research ==
In addition to his scientific research into fertility and pregnancy, Wiesner was intrigued by parapsychological phenomena, and in 1941, he met the psychologist and parapsychologist Robert Thouless who was President of the Society for Psychical Research in London from 1942 until 1944. Wiesner and Thouless collaborated on constructing a hypothetical model to explain parapsychological phenomena. During this time, Wiesner coined the term 'Psi' to denote extrasensory perception and psychokinesis. Their model, which was not intended to prove or disprove the existence of such phenomena, was first introduced in 1946, as part of a jointly authored paper in which Wiesner and Robert Thouless use the term 'Psi' to indicate parapsychological phenomena.

== Offspring ==
In 2007, the son of Wiesner and Barton's marriage, Jonathan Wiesner, provided saliva and blood from which his DNA was isolated and held on record. Since then, about fifty people have been able to verify that Bertold Paul Wiesner is their biological father through a DNA match to Jonathan Wiesner and to each other. Wiesner's biological offspring, conceived by artificial insemination performed by Mary Barton and confirmed by DNA testing, include author and psychotherapist Paul Newham, barrister David Gollancz, writer Michael Bywater, comedian Simon Evans and film maker Barry Stevens, whose documentary films were instrumental in facilitating and publicising the process by which Wiesner's offspring can confirm their paternity. In 2018, some of Wiesner's siblings were involved in a participatory action research process to explore their views about genomics research.

== Death ==
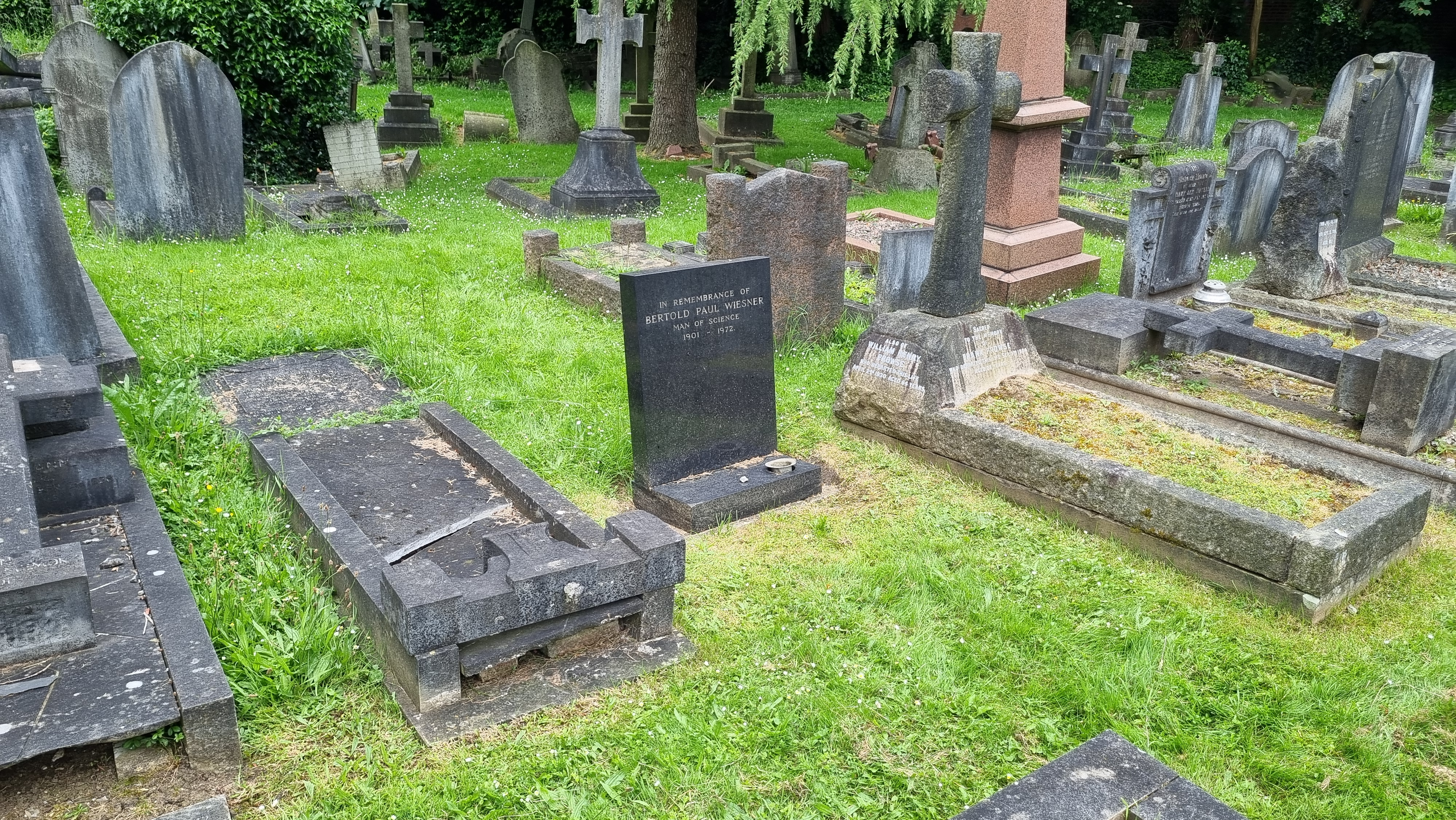
Wiesner's grave at East Finchley Cemetery. The inscription reads "In remembrance of Bertold Paul Wiesner / Man of science / 1901 – 1972."

Wiesner died of a pulmonary embolism on 7 January 1972 in Ealing, UK. He had been resident at the Twyford Abbey nursing home. He had a Church of England funeral service, and is buried at East Finchley Cemetery.

== Documentaries ==
His son Barry Stevens made several films about this story:

- Offspring (2001)
- Bio-Dad (2009)
- The World’s Biggest Family (2021)Video 720px

== See also ==
- List of people with the most children
