= Mary Barton (obstetrician) =

Obstetrician, founded a fertility clinic in London

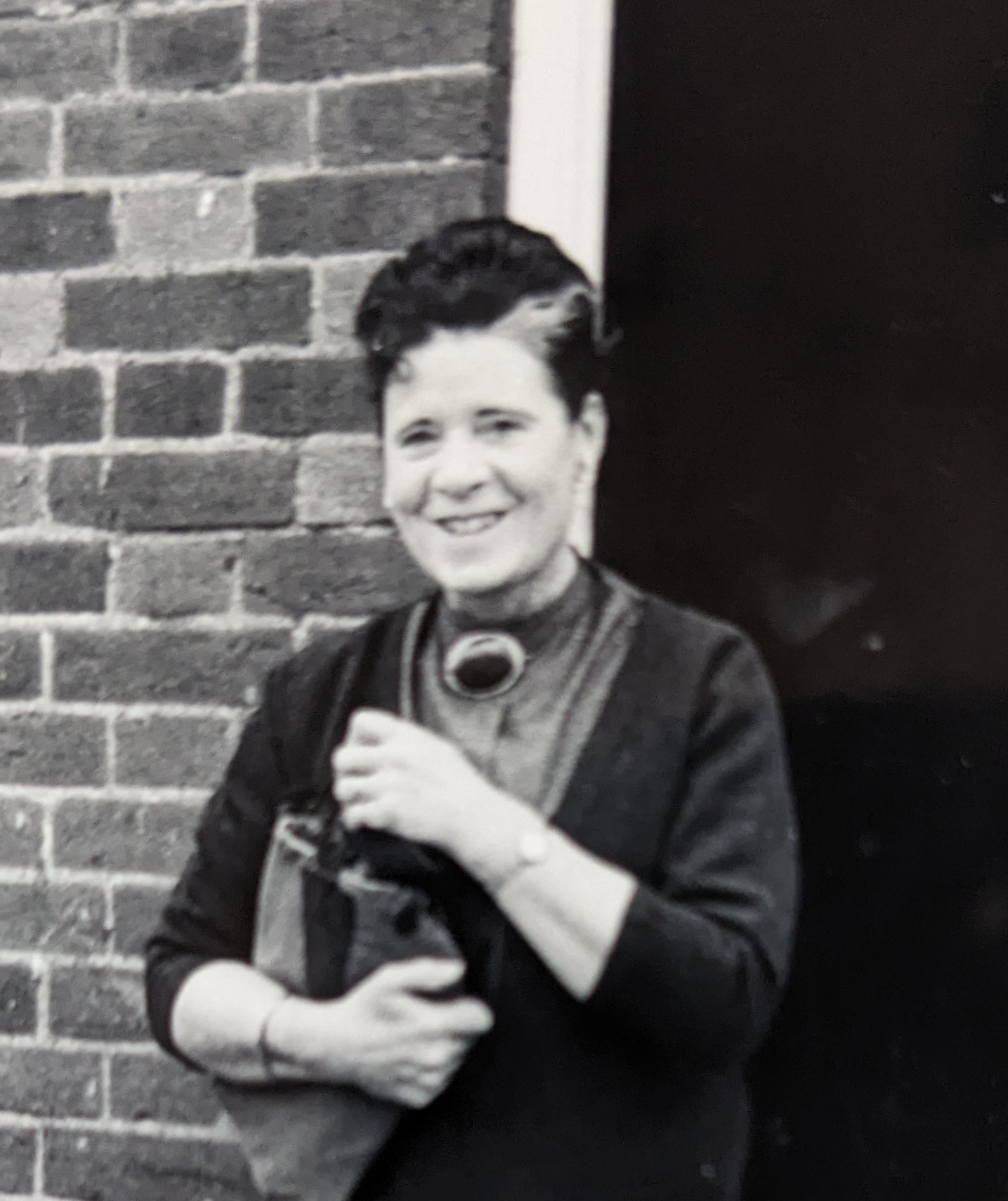
- Born: 1 March 1905; Lowestoft
- Died: 1990
- Scientific career
- Fields: Obstetrics, Fertility, Artificial insemination
- Workplaces: Royal Free Hospital

Mary Barton (1 March 1905 – 1990) was a British obstetrician who, in the 1930s, founded one of the first fertility clinics in England to offer donor insemination. Throughout her career, Barton studied infertility and conception. Her pioneering research and practice were inspired by experience as a medical missionary in India, where she saw the harsh treatment of childless women.

At the time, infertility was widely believed to be the woman's fault. Barton understood that both men and women could be infertile. Both the identification of the male as an infertile partner and the introduction of treatments that used "instrumental insemination" met with strong social disapproval. This was true even when using the husband's sperm, a process known as artificial insemination by husband, or AIH. Artificial insemination by donor, AID, was even more contentious, raising questions of adultery, illegitimacy, and perjury. This led to practices of secrecy.

In one of her research papers on fertility and conception, Barton reports successfully treating over 1,000 women using AID, 600 cases between 1944 and 1954 and another 431 women from 1955 to the end of December 1962. Thousands more women were treated at her clinic for AIH.

Barton's second husband, sex researcher Bertold Wiesner, is believed to have been in charge of recruiting sperm donors for Barton's clinic. He and a small number of other donors may have provided the majority of the sperm used, resulting in the birth of hundreds of half-siblings, most of whom had no knowledge of their conception. The clinic's patient records were allegedly destroyed, but DNA testing has identified groups of half-siblings. The Barton clinic has been the subject of the documentaries Offspring (2001) and Bio-Dad (2009) by Barry Stevens and of a play by Maud Dromgoole.

== Early life and marriages ==
Mary (née Worthington) was born in Lowestoft, Suffolk, in a family of several generations of surgeons and doctors. She attended Norwich High School for Girls from 1915 to 1923, and in October 1923 she commenced studies at the London School of Medicine for Women. She received her Bachelor of Medicine and Bachelor of Surgery from the University of London in 1929.

She married Douglas Barton, a doctor who was based in Dera Ismail Khan, a city in what was then British India's Northwest Frontier Province, and is now Khyber Pakhtunkhwa in Pakistan. The couple practised in a missionary hospital. They divorced in 1939; she retained his name for the rest of her professional career.

Mary Barton married Austrian physiologist Bertold Paul Wiesner in 1943. They had a son, Jonathan, and a daughter, Ruth.

== Early career ==
Mary Barton and her first husband were medical missionaries in pre-partition India, then still ruled by Britain. She witnessed the way in which women would be punished or even killed for being childless. At the time, it was taboo to suggest that it might be the husband, and not the wife, who was infertile - not only on the Indian subcontinent but also in the United Kingdom.

Barton understood that both men and women could be infertile. As early as 16 October 1943, she was the lead author on an article in The British Medical Journal, discussing "Sterility and Impaired Fertility" in both men and women. It was signed by many of the researchers active in the field in Great Britain at that time.

== The Barton Clinic ==
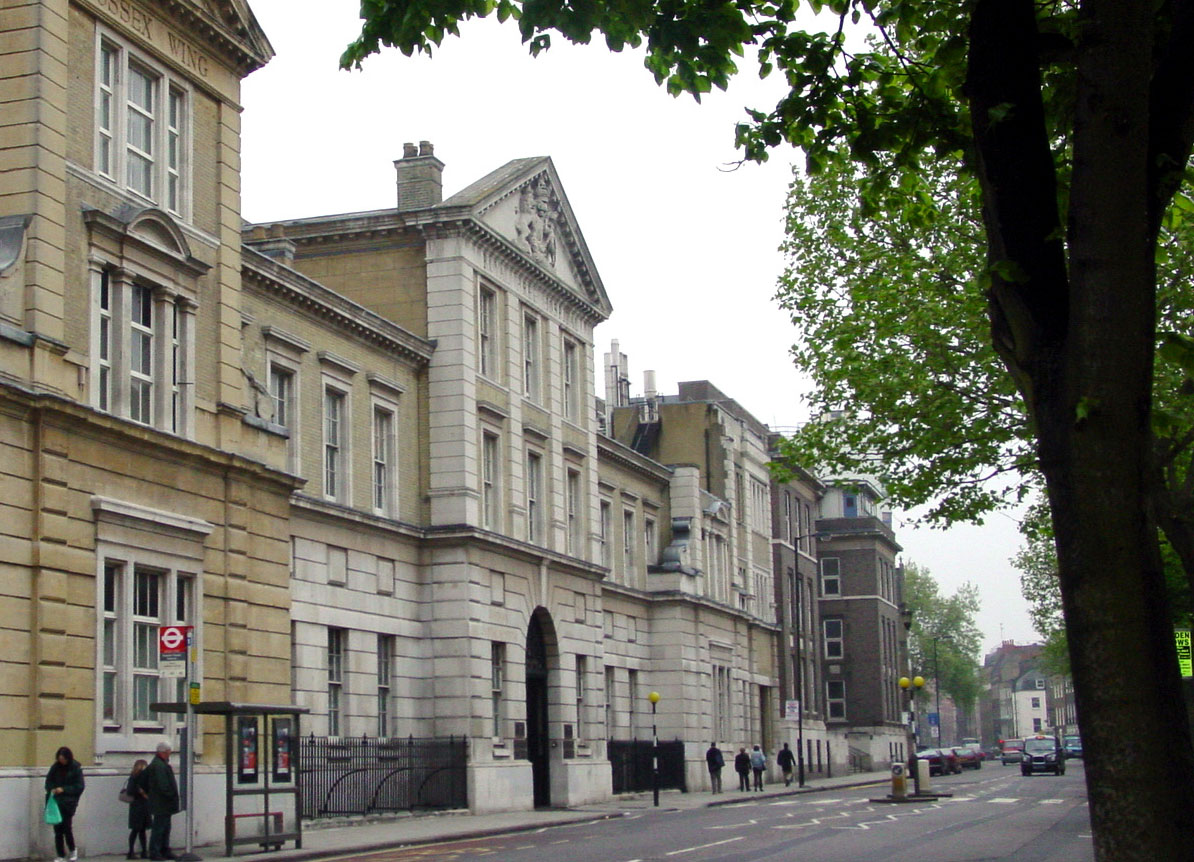
The Royal Free Hospital's site in Gray's Inn Road, as Barton would have known it.

Mary Barton returned to London and established a fertility clinic as early as 1940, one of the first people to do so. She was a pioneer of artificial insemination by husband (AIH) and Artificial Insemination by Donor (AID) for married couples unable to conceive a child due to male infertility. The practice was medically ground-breaking, helping women conceive 1,500 babies using AID and thousands more using AIH.

While Mary Barton's offices are frequently referred to as the "Barton Clinic", she practiced from a single consulting room, plus an office for her medical secretary, Miss Gwen Jenkins, who worked with her for some 30 years. Barton's offices were in the Harley Street area of London, in Portland Place in the 1950s and in Wimpole Street in the 1960s.

Barton also worked at a fertility clinic at the Royal Free Hospital, a significant teaching hospital which became part of the newly formed National Health Service in 1948. It is likely that this was a "clinic" shared with colleagues. Her private clinic, on the other hand, operated outside of the NHS. Barton's second husband, biologist and physiologist Bertold Wiesner, was associated with the Royal Northern Hospital, as was genito-urinary surgeon Kenneth Walker.

Barriers to treatment for infertility were psychological, social, and also financial. It was extremely difficult for couples to find "an appropriate and sympathetic practitioner" who could carry out insemination. Couples were referred to London's clinics from all over England, and as far away as Rome and South Africa.

Actual treatment was not a simple matter. Barton was both a researcher and a clinician. She worked closely with each couple to diagnose and address possible causes of infertility. In cases where the husband was already diagnosed as sterile, AID could be considered as a possible option. Patients underwent preliminary examinations to establish "whether the basic attributes of fecundity were present". Barton reported that upon examination, 76% of wives with infertile husbands themselves displayed factors relating to severe infertility. Two of the most prevalent factors in women were cervical dysfunction and pelvic infection. They could only considered for AID if these underlying problems could be addressed, which might require several months of preliminary treatment. Where AID was eventually attempted, the clinic's conception rates were relatively high, reported at 58% (1944–1954) and 67% (1955–1962).

Given both social taboos around the subject of infertility and the lack of legal regulation for such work at the time, Barton advised secrecy about the service she offered, telling the parents they should never let their children find out how they had been conceived or identify the donors.

It is not surprising that the clinic records appear to have been destroyed, possibly when the London clinic closed in 1967 or after Wiesner's death in 1972. The issue of whether adoptees have a right to obtain information about donor parents is still hotly debated.

== Controversial nature of insemination ==
In 1945 Barton, Walker, and Wiesner published a paper about artificial insemination in the British Medical Journal. The main focus of the article was artificial insemination by husband, used in cases of impotence, failure to ejaculate during intercourse, and female dyspareunia (painful intercourse). They also noted that donor sperm had been used in rare cases of male sterility or to avoid hereditary disease.

Because these services were new, there were no medical or legal regulations governing them. While successful artificial insemination births were documented late in the 19th century, the practice was not widely accepted as ethical in Britain, even when used for the breeding of farm animals. There was strong social stigma about such work. It was argued that artificial insemination was a form of adultery. Donor-conceived children were considered illegitimate, even if the husband had agreed to the procedure, and the registration of the husband's name on the birth certificate of such a child was considered perjury.

=== Wand Report ===
In response to Barton's article, Geoffrey Fisher, then Archbishop of Canterbury established a religious commission on artificial human insemination in December 1945. It was chaired by John William Charles Wand, the Bishop of London. Its purpose was "To consider the practice of human artificial insemination with special reference to its theological, moral, social, psychological, and legal implications." The commission published its report, sometimes referred to as the Wand Report, in 1948.

Artificial human insemination was seen as posing social and legal threats to the institution of marriage and the status of children, not least due to secrecy and deception around a child's paternity. The commission noted that children of donors might intermarry and commit incest without knowing that they were closely genetically related, with genetic risks to their offspring. Another fear was that preferential choice of male children might cause a gender imbalance in society. The commission called unsuccessfully for AID to be made a criminal offense.

There was one dissenting vote, from Walter Matthews, the Dean of St. Paul's Cathedral in London. Matthews suggested that the psychological issues to be faced by AID children might be similar to those of adopted children. He also opposed the commission's interpretation of AID as adulterous, arguing that the "spiritual elements which constitute the sin of adultery are absent".

=== Feversham Committee ===
In 1958, a government committee known as the Feversham Committee was appointed "To enquire into the existing practice of human artificial insemination and its legal consequences; and to consider whether, taking account of the interests of the individuals involved and of society as a whole, any change in the law is necessary or desirable." It was chaired by Charles Duncombe, 3rd Earl of Feversham and the meetings were held privately. The committee requested oral and written testimony from 100 organizations and individuals in Great Britain and worldwide. The responses they received were predominantly religious, with some medical and very little legal representation. Its conclusions were published in July 1960.

Mary Barton was one of those who testified before the committee. At the time that the Feversham Committee surveyed the field, only six doctors in Britain regularly provided artificial insemination by donor, all in England: Bernard Sandler (Manchester), Margaret Jackson (Exeter), Mary Barton, Philip Bloom, Reynold Boyd, and Eleanor Mears (all in London). Artificial insemination was much more widely used in other countries, particularly in the United States and Israel.

The Feversham Committee's proceedings provide valuable indicators of how infertility and artificial insemination were viewed in Britain, by people holding a wide range of perspectives. Many of those who spoke to the commission had little experience in the practice of AID. Nonetheless, they often held strong views, and made their moral objections clear, even when they admitted to having little factual knowledge. It is clear that more couples sought assistance than could be treated. Sometimes doctors reported intentionally intimidating those seeking help. The Royal College of Surgeons of Edinburgh testified that "it is our intention to make the whole thing rather difficult". Those seeking and providing treatment - couples, donors, and doctors - were often pathologized.

That social stigma around artificial insemination was strong is illustrated by the words of Lord Blackford, who appealed to the House of Lords to "reject with horror this brain-wave of Beelzebub". Blackford had moved to make artificial insemination by donor illegal, as being a form of adultery, but in the end he withdrew his motion. He stated that his second objective, a full debate on the topic, had been achieved.

In this context, Lord Blackford's comments on Mary Barton, who he identified as "a leading exponent in this field", are of particular interest.

'I have had the great advantage of a long interview with Dr. Mary Barton. She is a most co-operative individual, who answered all questions with frank directness, or with vigorous rebuttal if she did not agree with me (which was often the case); she is devoted to her practice and utterly convinced that she confers a great benefit and happiness on all her patients. At the end of our interview, which lasted an hour and a half and was conducted in the presence of two other doctors, I asked her to what extent, if at all, I might quote her. After a moment's consultation with the doctors as to whether to allow her name to be used might be unethical, she looked at me directly and said, "You can repeat as much as you like; I have nothing to hide,"—altogether a most engaging personality.' —Lord Blackford, 26 February 1958

Others who read the Feversham Committee's report considered that, far from reflecting a full debate, it was lacking in necessary factual background, "vague", "superficial", "totally inadequate", and in the end "inconclusive". The committee clearly disliked the idea of AID. At the same time, they did not consider regulation practical, and feared to increase AID's visibility by giving it any form of official recognition.

== Choice of donors ==
A concern of both critics and proponents of artificial insemination was the quality of the donor sperm. Barton emphasized that donors should be free of disease (transmissible or hereditary) and "characteristics of possible genetic significance" (which included both alcoholism and criminality). Barton also stated that the donors for her clinic were perceived to be "above average" intelligence.

In choosing a donor for a couple, Barton tried to find a match who was physically similar to the parents, particularly the father. While emphasizing that there was no guarantee of a child's appearance, it was hoped that a resemblance would occur and make it easier for the family to connect emotionally.

"I matched race, coloring and stature and all donors were drawn from intelligent stock.... I wouldn't take a donor unless he was, if anything, a little above average. If you are going to do it [create a child] deliberately, you have got to put the standards rather higher than normal." Mary Barton, 1958 Commission

Barton did not mention eugenics as a reason for using AID in her 1945 paper. However, the Wand Report noted that parents might wish to use AID when "the paternity of a man endowed with outstanding qualities is desired" and quoted from The Uniqueness of Man by Julian Huxley. Eugenicists were certainly interested in Barton's work, and their motivations went far beyond Barton's goal of helping childless women to conceive. The possible impact of sperm donation on the population of male offspring was much discussed (females received less attention).

The Wand Report worried that donors might have "absurd and inflated opinions of [their] own worth and ability", and be attracted by pride, personal power, and freedom from responsibility for progeny. Were those attracted likely to be "abnormal and unbalanced" or even "psychopaths"? Would such characteristics appear in their children? The possibility of paying for sperm donation also raised concerns about the desirability of the possible donors. In contrast, obstetrician Margaret Jackson argued that a sperm donor was likely preferable genetically to a random sexual encounter or "fling" with a "fancy man".

As Barton and others informed the Feversham commission, it was difficult to find donors. They were often former patients, husbands of patients, members of the doctors' family, or acquaintances. In 1945, Barton warned of the emotional danger attendant on donation from a known individual such as a husband's brother; such situations often resulted in "emotional disturbance" for all involved. Donors were expected to remain separate from the families whose children they engendered. It was recommended that donors and recipients be kept unaware of each other's identities. An unfortunate result of such secrecy, pointed out by the Wand and Feversham reports, was a lack of research on the impact on families, either positive or negative.

== Identity of donors ==
In their 1945 paper in the British Medical Journal, Barton and fellow authors Walker and Wiesner explained that they used a "small panel of donors" that they considered of "intelligent stock".

Wiesner was responsible for recruiting donors for Barton's clinic. DNA evidence suggests that many of the babies were conceived using sperm from Wiesner himself. His son, Jonathan Wiesner, underwent DNA testing in 2007 which provided a basis for identification. Some estimates suggest that of the more than 1,000 successful AID pregnancies Barton reported, Wiesner may have been responsible for as many as 2/3, or 600 children. Another major donor was neuroscientist Derek Richter, who may have fathered more than a hundred babies.

It is unclear whether Barton knew that much of the sperm used came from her husband. She kept records of donors identified with code names. Documentary filmmaker Barry Stevens has stated "it's possible he [Bertold Wiesner] didn't tell his wife and she believed the donations were coming from a lot of different men".

Regardless, as a scientist specialising in fertility (among other areas), Wiesner himself should have been aware that there were genetic risks created by his fathering so many children. Such risks were known and were identified in the Wand Report.

== Legacy ==
Mary Barton's clinic was one of the first in Great Britain to offer artificial insemination. The clinic helped an unknown number of previously childless women to conceive babies. Estimates are that thousands of women were able to conceive as a result of artificial insemination with their husband's sperm. Possibly as many as 1,500 more women conceived using artificial insemination by donor. The majority of the sperm donations may have come from a few progenitors.

The question of whether donors should be anonymous continues to be contentious, and laws vary widely from country to country. Mary Barton and Bertold Wiesner likely believed that after the destruction of the clinic's records, the parentage of the children conceived at the clinic would be untraceable. They could not have foreseen the implications of contemporary research into the structure of DNA. The increasing availability of consumer genetic tests has made the anonymity of sperm donation practically impossible.

Laws regulating human artificial insemination were eventually introduced, but not until Britain's Human Fertilisation and Embryology Act of 1990. Since 1991 the Human Fertilisation and Embryology Authority has regulated clinics in Britain. A sperm donor can donate for use by no more than ten families. Donor information must be kept on record and children born after 2005 can apply for that information once they are 18. Availability and quality of donor sperm continue to be concerns.

Barton died in 1990.
