= Monster Mission =

Novel by Eva Ibbotson

First edition (publ. Macmillan)

Monster Mission (ISBN 9780525464846, 1999) is a children's book written by Eva Ibbotson. It was also published under the title Island of the Aunts. It was a Publishers Weekly bestseller and a School Library Journal Best Book of 2000.

== Plot ==
Etta, Coral, and Myrtle are three sisters who live on an island, taking care of injured and sick creatures, but the work is getting too much for them as they get older. They decide to go to London to "choose" (kidnap) children to help them. Etta kidnaps a young girl named Minette, whose constantly bickering parents are separated. Coral brings a boy named Fabio, originally from Brazil, who is learning to be an "English gentleman" at the horrible Greymarsh Towers. Myrtle is forced to bring a boy named Lambert, whom she thinks is horrid, after he accidentally sniffs chloroform. Their sister Betty also sends her spoiled children Boo-Boo and Little One with her to the island to be looked after when she breaks her hip.

On the island, Minette and Fabio are quickly put to work on the bed. They carry stranded jellyfish back to the sea and hold an eel with scabies. Meanwhile, Lambert is kept in his room because he refuses to help so he does other inappropriate things. One day, though, Etta introduces them to a small family of mermaids, part of the menagerie of exotic creatures who sought refuge on the island. The children also meet the Stoorworm, a wingless Icelandic dragon, the egg-bound boobrie (a bird apparently similar to the dodo, but vastly larger), and talk with the selkies (seals) who can change into humans (they were told if you stab a selkie with a knife it will turn into a human). Lambert is shocked at the discovery, but Fabio tells them that they are hallucinations caused by drugs put in their food. This keeps Lambert quiet, but more determined to be rescued.

After some time, the Great Kraken begins swimming the seas to bring peace to the waters once more. Initially accompanied with his child, he leaves it with the Aunts ("blessing" the island) because it is too young to travel the world with its father. The little Kraken misses his father but quickly befriends Minette and Fabio. Back in London, word spreads about the two "kidnappers". Minette's parents have a "war" as they try to outdo each other's "sorrow for their loss" at the news and Fabio's strict grandparents consider suing the police for not doing their job.

Lambert, though, finally finds his mobilephone, which he uses to call his father, Mr. Sprott, for help. When Sprott reaches his son and sees all the fantastical creatures on the island as a chance, he captures them. He reports the island's location to the police who fly off to rescue Minette and Fabio. The two quickly come up with an idea and lead the police to believe Boo-Boo and Little One are the aunts' victims. They are flown back to London and leave the real children free to attempt to rescue their friends, though when all hope is lost, they convince the Kraken’s son to try using the peace-bringing powers that runs in his family, prompting his father to return and overpower Sprott's yacht. Everyone is rescued, though Sprott and Lambert believe everything that happened was a hallucination. The Kraken chooses to bring his son with him on his journey, simply making it slower until the child is old enough. With the "kidnappers" finally revealed, the aunts are put on trial. Minette and Fabio, however, present an argument that convinces the jury that they are innocent. Fabio is allowed to return home to Brazil, and Minette's parents call a truce. The aunts write a will, leaving the island to both Minette and Fabio, who promise to return one day.

== Film adaptation ==
In 2011, the screenplay for a feature film based on Island of the Aunts was being written by Enda Walsh.
