= Dial-a-Ghost =

1996 children's novel by Eva Ibbotson

- Author: Eva Ibbotson
- Cover artist: Kevin Hawkes
- Language: English
- Publisher: Penguin Group
- Publication date: 1996
- Publication place: United Kingdom
- Media type: Print (Paperback)
- Pages: 176
- ISBN: 978-0-525-46693-2

Dial-a-Ghost is a 1996 children's novel written by Eva Ibbotson and illustrated by Kevin Hawkes. The plot follows an orphan named Oliver who inherits Helton Hall, and whose cousins Frieda and Fulton Snodde-Brittle plot to kill him in the hopes of inheriting the property.

== Plot ==
The Wilkinson family become ghosts after they die in a tragic bombing in World War II. Initially, they haunt their home, Resthaven, and they adopt another young ghost, a girl they name Adopta, who has no memory of her past. When the arrival of new owners forces them to leave, they travel to London and reluctantly begin haunting an underwear store, and apply to the Dial-a-Ghost agency for a new home. The Dial-a-Ghost agency finds the perfect home for the Wilkinsons in a ruined abbey, and tells them they can move in on Friday 13th.

Meanwhile, orphan Oliver Smith is surprised to learn he is a descendant of the Snodde-Brittle family, and that he now owns Helton Hall following the death of a cousin. He is taken from the orphanage to Helton Hall by his cousins Fulton and Frieda, who feel they should rightly have inherited the Hall. Learning that Oliver is asthmatic, Fulton hires some terrifying, child-hating ghosts known as the Shriekers, hoping to frighten Oliver to death.

On the day of the move, the two sets of ghosts receive each other's directions by accident. The Wilkinsons arrive at Helton Hall, and, although they initially scare Oliver, they soon become close friends. The Shriekers, however, are exorcised from the ruined abbey after attacking livestock belonging to the nunnery. When the Dial-a-Ghost agency realizes their mistake, they send the Shriekers to Helton Hall and ring the Wilkinsons to apologize. Oliver, however, refuses to let the Wilkinsons leave and also invites their friends from London to move in.

When the Shriekers arrive, they attack Oliver, but are distracted by Adopta - the daughter whose loss drove them to madness. They agree to behave better in future, but are confused as to why they were sent to attack Oliver when he is supposed to have ordered child-hating ghosts. The Wilkinsons realize Fulton is to blame and send Oliver to London to keep him safe. Fulton and Frieda are now in severe debt and, believing Oliver to have been killed by the Shriekers, spend thirty thousand pounds on 'Ectoplasm Eating Bacteria' to clear out the ghosts.

Oliver returns home to the unmoving remains of the ghosts, and is distraught. He attacks Fulton and Frieda, but is distracted by a ghost budgie for long enough to let them escape. As the ghosts wake up, they realise the Ectoplasm Eating Bacteria was a con, and Oliver happily opens up the Hall to any ghosts needing a home, running it as a tourist attraction and a paranormal research institute. He even rebuilds the Wilkinson's home, Resthaven, recreating it exactly as it was before the bombing. Frieda, meanwhile, repents her sins and becomes a nun, but Fulton goes after the con artists. He is killed and asks for a home from the Dial-a-Ghost agency, who send him to the underwear store.

== Characters ==
- Fulton Snodde-Brittle - Considering himself the rightful owner of the Hall, he tries to kill Oliver. He hates ghosts.
- Frieda Snodde-Brittle - Fulton's sister. She feels sorry for what she has done and becomes a nun.
- Colonel Mersham - Oliver's legal guardian. An explorer, travels most of the time.
- Trevor, Nonie, Harry, Tabitha and Durga - Oliver's friends from the orphanage.
- Miss Pringle and Mrs Mannering - The women who run the Dial-a-Ghost agency.
