= A Countess Below Stairs =

1981 novel by Eva Ibbotson

A Countess Below Stairs aka The Secret countess
- Language: English
- Genre: Historical fiction
- Published: 1981 (Macdonald Futura)
- Publication place: United Kingdom
- Media type: Print (Hardcover & Paperback)
- Pages: 383 pp (HB)
- ISBN: 0-354-04714-0 (HB)
- OCLC: 143382522

A Countess Below Stairs is a 1981 British historical romance novel by Eva Ibbotson. It follows the story of Anna Grazinsky, a Russian countess, after World War I. It has also been published under the title The Secret Countess as a young adult novel.

== Synopsis ==
Anna is a charming child who sees the good in everything and everyone: her cousin Sergei, her younger brother Petya, and all of her multiple governesses. She has lived her whole life being pampered and adored by her father, fussed over by the servants, and cosseted by her mother. However, she is forced to flee Russia after the Bolsheviks seize power and her father dies in The First World War. Forced to depend on the charity of her governess, Pinny, Anna takes a position as a housemaid at Mersham, home of Rupert Frayne, Earl of Westerholme. She keeps this a secret from her brother and cousin, telling her ailing mother she has been invited to stay at the country manor.

The staff resent her employment, as they immediately realise she is nobly born. Despite their concerns, Anna proves herself hard-working and intelligent. As her fellow employees grow to love Anna, the Earl sends a message that he returning from service in the war. Having made a promise to his late older brother, Rupert is bringing home a rich fiancée to help fulfill Mersham's many debts. Upon meeting Anna, her grace and high spirits are obvious to him, and the two get along very well.

When Muriel Hardwicke, Rupert's fiancée, arrives, everyone is first compelled to love her. Soon afterward, Mersham's inhabitants and neighbours see Muriel is a selfish, rude, vain, and nasty young woman, despite her flawless appearance. She is unfriendly to the staff, the dowager, the dog, and even to good family friends the Minna, and Viscount Byrne, bluntly insulting their daughter, the Honorable Olive, and her disability. Out of love and respect for Rupert, those Muriel offends suffer in silence, not wanting to ill-wish the Earl's bride. Learning of Muriel's deeds later, Rupert is angry and realises he did not ever truly love her, just as he falls in love with Anna. Nonetheless, he is a man of his word and will not jilt Muriel.

Anna finds it harder to conceal her identity as a countess as she grows closer to Rupert. When he learns of her identity, he initially plans to dismiss her but relents when she becomes miserable. At a fancy-dress ball held in Muriel and Rupert's honour by the Byrnes, Anna is asked to serve drinks because of her Russian nationality, which would be helpful for Russian guests. A school friend of the youngest Byrne boy, Henry, turns out to be Anna's younger brother, Peter. Unknowing of Anna's employment as an under-housemaid, he introduces her to all present as Countess Grazinsky. For Peter's sake, her friends act as if she were always a guest. When Anna and Rupert share a dance, it becomes obvious that he is engaged to the wrong woman.

Alone, they confess their affections but accept they have no future together. As Anna considers her feelings, she and her cousin, Prince Sergei Chirkovsky, confide in their problems and embrace. Rupert sees them, assumes they are eloping, and continues plans for the wedding. Upset, Cyril Proom, the butler, acquires a large sum of money and uses it to convince Melvyn and Myrtle Herring, first cousins of Rupert, to carry out a favour. The distasteful Herrings and their estranged teenaged sons show themselves to be insane genetic mutations to Dr. Lightbody, a good friend of Muriel who studies Eugenics. Upset, he stops the wedding, and the appalled Muriel elopes with Dr. Lightbody.

In London, Anna receives word and her depression lifts. Days later, a letter arrives from Mersham claiming that she still owes five days of work to the house. It also assures her that the Earl is out of the country. Before leaving, the woman carrying her family's fortune arrives at long last and her family begins to catch up on their old life. Anna's first job involves serving at the table for a small dinner party. Walking into the room, she is surprised when Rupert is present, and raises his voice in her direction. She lets out a defiant, long-winded reply and bursts into tears. Rupert stands up to comfort her, much to the surprise of his guests. The couple is married the following summer.

== Characters ==
=== Anna Grazinsky ===
Eighteen-year-old Anna is a charming, graceful young woman who grows up in Russia but is forced to flee her country during World War I. She is a very high born countess, but humble and not spoiled despite her doting parents and their riches. Her compassion is clear in her personality, as is her love for conversation and her natural determination. When her family arrives in England, penniless, she seeks work at Mersham behind her family's backs, trusting in her nanny and friend, Pinny. She quickly befriends and later falls in love with the young earl of Mersham, but conceals this as he is engaged to another woman. She gets along very well with the servants and occupants at Mersham, save for Muriel, the bride-to-be. She is described as having a slight figure and small bones, dark eyes with long and dark and attractive hair. Anna also has a habit of rolling the letter "r" very badly when she is upset, giving her away when she tries to conceal her emotions.

=== Rupert Frayne, Earl of Mersham ===
Rupert Frayne is the Earl of Mersham, named so when his older brother dies in the war. He is said to be more scholarly and less ambitious than his brother, making him better suited for the inheritance. He sees the details in things around him, and has a good heart. While sick during the war, he was attended by a nurse Muriel Hardwicke. By the end of his time there they are engaged, though Rupert later realises that he does not remember actually asking Muriel and assumed this was due to painkillers and sickness causing memory loss. He slowly realises that Muriel is after his title and falls in love with Anna, though he refuses to jilt Muriel. He loves his dog Baskerville and his mother, uncle Sebastian, and personally knows every one of Mersham's staff.

=== Muriel Hardwicke ===
Muriel Hardwicke is an orphan, engaged to Rupert after she tended to his injuries in the war. Though she is actually very rich (her father was a millionaire), she is above all a grocer's daughter after a noble title. She conceals her family from Rupert to keep her lies about her money and history a secret. Muriel is very interested in eugenics and represents this perfectly with her perfectly formed body and skills, which she is quite proud of. She is very afraid of marrying into a family with history of strange deviations or biological defects. This is why she runs away from Rupert in the end—his first cousins are paid to act like insane and malformed creatures, and she refuses to marry into a 'tainted' family. She is very proud and expects nothing but the best for herself, at any cost.

=== Proom ===
Mr. Proom is the devoted butler at Mersham. He treats every situation with calm and is responsible for all servants at his workplace. He is kind but firm in his ways. It is said that others don't envy Rupert for Mersham, but instead they envy him Proom. He once saved Susie Rabinovitch's life, and so her father Leo lends him money to have Muriel fooled and frightened away from Rupert. His bedridden, schizophrenic mother lives in a cottage on Mersham grounds.

=== Mrs. Bassenthwaite ===
Mrs. Bassenthwaite is Mersham's housekeeper. She is kind and does her job well, and also relatively close with the dowager. She is reluctant to hire Anna at first, seeing her nobility in her movement and speech, but does not regret it after seeing how hard Anna works. The housekeeper contracts appendicitis and while in the hospital, Muriel sees her chance to take control of Mersham and to make her own changes to the employee line-ups and actions.

=== The Dowager ===
Rupert's Mother's name, Mary, is seldom mentioned in the book. She left the running of Mersham to Proom and then Rupert after losing her husband and then her son within a year of each other. She is very close with Minna Byrne and strives to see the best in everybody. She is the ancient Sebastien's niece by marriage.

=== Sebastien ===
Sebastien lives in a corner of Mersham, alone with his music. He played when he was younger, but seldom does so in his old age. He is said to be old and rude and annoying before Anna first begins to serve him, but is particularly nice to her, even having her stay to chat and listen to records with him. Sebastien is said to have had an attraction to maidservants in uniforms since his youth, and gropes them and touches them when they bring him his meals but he leaves Anna alone, treating her instead like a daughter.

=== The Byrnes ===
Minna Byrne is Mary's best friend and beloved stepmother to 8-year-old Ollie and three lusty, red-headed sons—Tom, Geoffrey and Hugh. Ollie contracted tuberculosis of the hip at a very young age and has one leg shortened and on calipers—though she was born prematurely and has spent 3 or 4 years of her life in hospitals. Anyone speaking ill of her within 50 miles of Heslop (her home) or Mersham would be found lying face down in a ditch with a bloody nose. However, Muriel seems to escape this fate when she humiliates Ollie in front of the other bridesmaids at the dress fitting. Little Ollie is comforted when Anna takes her to the Russian Club, where she falls head over heels for Russian culture and from then on, she insists that she wants to be Russian. Her oldest brother Tom is Rupert's best man, a handsome heir to the viscount title, and in love with Susie Rabinovitch who finally agrees to marry him after possibly his 17th or 18th proposal. Geoffrey, the middle brother, was killed at Paschendale. Hugh is only 12 or 13 and goes to school with Anna's younger brother Petya (or Peter), who is a good friend of his. Viscount Byrne is reserved and enjoys hunting or camping, has little interest and running the household, and married Minna out of need for a lady to keep house—within a year of his wife's death. His sons instinctively dislike her and he does not love her at first, though unexpectedly all four grow completely devoted to her as she modestly runs the house, seeing its needs and disreputing wicked stepmothers from the beginning of time.

=== Mersham Employees ===
Louise is the head housemaid. Described as young, frizzy haired and short-tempered, she speaks bluntly but does her work well. Two under-housemaids are the giggly sisters Peggy and Pearl. Mrs. Park, the cook, is like a mother figure to the other employees who meet in the kitchens with her optimism, friendliness and culinary skills, though she feels she lacks in the latter. She is especially important to Win, a kitchen help who is stated to have an unspecified disability, though it is mentioned that part of it is the inability to speak. Elsewhere in the house, James is a short but muscly footman who has devotedly worked at Mersham since he was quite young and small. Sid is the second footman.

=== Sergei ===
Described as being tall and incredibly handsome, and a few years older than Anna, Sergei works as a chauffeur for one of Muriel's "friends". All five of the daughters of his employers are in love with him. Olive Byrne also develops a crush on him when he treats her like a princess at the Russian Club. Sergei is a prince in Russia, first cousin to the Tsar and also to Anna, whom he grew up with as a sister. He once saved Anna from drowning by pulling her up by her hair. He is incredibly kind, but a very minor character. When Anna finds him after she flees Muriel's ball, Rupert sees her crying on Sergei's shoulder and assumes that they plan to marry.
