= The Morning Gift =

1993 novel by Eva Ibbotson

- First US edition
- Author: Eva Ibbotson
- Language: English
- Genre: Romance
- Publisher: Random Books (UK); St. Martin's Press (US)
- Publication date: 1993
- Pages: 416

The Morning Gift is a bestselling novel by English author Eva Ibbotson, based on her own experience as a refugee.

The story is set during the prelude and beginning of the Second World War and combines a picture of 1930s emigrant life with a love story.

First published in 1993, the book very soon became a bestseller. It was reissued in 2007, after briefly being out of print, where copies of the book changed hands for over GBP 100 a piece. A third edition was published in 2019 with a preface by Sarra Manning, followed by a fourth edition in 2025 to commemorate 100 years since Ibbotson's birth.

== Background ==
The book is based on Eva Ibbotson's own experience as a refugee and many elements and characters within the novel follow events and people in her own life.

Ibbotson was born in Vienna, Austria, in 1925 to a scientist father and the acclaimed writer Anna Gmeyner

..."who belonged to that displaced group of Jews that were created by Hitler - assimilated, non-religious intellectuals, the backbone of Austrian and German cultural life, many of whom had never set foot inside a synagogue"...
(Eva Ibbotson - Preface to the novel Manja by her mother Anna Gmeyner)

A few years later her parents separated and Ibbotson moved to Berlin with her mother, who worked with the legends of the Weimar Republic, like Bertolt Brecht, Hanns Eisler and G. W. Pabst. When Anna Gmeyner had to relocate to Paris for work in 1933, Ibbotson was sent back to her grandparents in Vienna.

In 1935 Gmeyner's work was banned by the Nazi Party and she fled to England like many others in the years after Hitler came to power. Her daughter had to flee Vienna, and Ibbotson joined her mother at Belsize Park in north-west London.

Her escape from Austria, the experience of being uprooted from her life in Vienna, and her new life as a refugee in Belsize Park would later become the backbone of Ibbotson's novel The Morning Gift.

..."its streets abounded with Jewish doctors and lawyers and school children; with Communists and Social Democrats, with actors and writers and bankers of no particular political persuasion who had spoken out against the Nazis. The war had not yet come, but these refugees saw its necessity as the English could not yet do. They used their humour to keep the terror and desolation at bay, but it was always there. This band of exiles had been deprived in a few years of the certainty of centuries"...
(Eva Ibbotson - Preface to the novel Manja by her mother Anna Gmeyner)

The experience of fleeing Vienna and the sight of friends and relatives who came through London as refugees, desperate and in fear, became a strong thread throughout Eva Ibbotson's life and work as her son Piers Ibbotson recently recalled in an interview.

== Plot summary ==
The Morning Gift tells the story of Ruth Berger, whose family is part of the Jewish Intelligentsia in Vienna. When the Nazis take over, the Bergers organize a student visa for Ruth to be sent ahead to England, not realizing that she will not be allowed to leave Austria because of her political leanings as a Social Democrat. When her father is suddenly arrested by the Gestapo, he is told to leave Austria within a week and while his family is able to escape to London, Ruth on a separate transport is stopped on the border by the SS and sent back to Vienna. Quinton Somerville, an English professor and scientist who worked with Professor Berger in the past, arrives in Vienna for an award ceremony and learns that Professor Berger has been dismissed. Trying to contact the family, he visits Bergers' home and discovers Ruth, who is desperate to find a way to escape to England. Several attempts to get a valid visa for Ruth fail and Quin realizes that the only way to get her out of the country quickly is through a marriage of convenience. The marriage has to stay a secret until Ruth receives British citizenship, but once safe in London, the annulment of the marriage takes much longer than expected.

Ruth and her family try to re-establish their life in the world of refugees, using their humour to keep the terror and desolation at bay. When the university that Ruth is set to attend is forced to transfer her, the Quakers enrol her into Quinton's university, Thameside. She ends up being lectured by her own husband by coincidence, alongside the snobbish and clever Verena Plackett, who has ambitiously set her sights on Quinton.

Unaware of Ruth's marriage of convenience, her real fiance Heini, a talented pianist from Budapest, escapes to England, and the unfolding events put Ruth and Quinton's secret marriage of convenience on the verge of being discovered and betrayed. Desperately trying to cling to their moral values, Ruth and Quin deny their growing attraction for each other - then World War II breaks out and personal intentions become insignificant.

== Reception ==
The Morning Gift's first review is featured on the dust jacket of the first edition, by feminist author Carol Clewlow:

"Eva Ibbotson's The Morning Gift is a delight, her most accomplished offering to date. The very best sort of romantic novel, it is full of great warmth and wit and packed to the hilt with the sort of delicious characters that are her speciality. There are asides in here worthy of Jane Austen. The real joy of Ibbotson's writing - as of Austen's - comes in those special moments of truth, that gentle, unobtrusive truth that only comes from a writer with a loving hand."

In 2019, the book was republished with a preface for the first time, penned by Sarra Manning. She touches on the love story at its heart, but also on the wider themes that the book tackles: "Though The Morning Gift was published in 1993, it's true to its Thirties setting and the casual but ingrained racism of the times, the mistrust of anyone different." Manning also echoes Clewlow's comparison between Ibbotson and Austen, noting "There's an echo of Jane Austen in Ibbotson's sly asides and her skilfully drawn characters, so that readers can know the very marrow of them in the space of just a few lines."

Jenny Colgan reviewed the book positively: "The Morning Gift is a perfect marriage of deep romance and gently observed social comedy...I think it is flawless", as did Marian Keyes, "Both [The Morning Gift and The Secret Countess] are written with such lightness of touch and extraordinary charm that they always change my mood to hopeful."

== Adaptation ==
Film rights had been bought for The Morning Gift. The film was in development and expected to be released in 2013, but was delayed.
