= A Company of Swans =

1985 novel by Eva Ibbotson

- First edition
- Author: Eva Ibbotson
- Language: English
- Genre: Historical, Romance novel
- Published: June 1985, Century, UK; Sept 1985 St Martins Press (US)
- Publication place: United Kingdom
- Media type: Print (Hardback & Paperback)
- Pages: 256 pp (first edition, hardback)
- ISBN: 978-0-7126-0818-3 (first edition, hardback)
- OCLC: 37145989

A Company of Swans is a historical romance novel published in 1985 by Eva Ibbotson. The book is dedicated to Patricia Veryan.

== Plot summary ==
Harriet Morton lives in Cambridge with her widowed father, the overprotective Professor Morton who teaches Classics at the University, and her controlling Aunt Louisa, who wishes her to marry an uninteresting entomology professor named Edward Finch-Dutton. When Harriet is two years old her mother dies from pneumonia. After her father and aunt ban her from attending school, believing women should not be highly educated, the only freedom allowed to her are ballet lessons at Madame Lavarre's school. One day, a lesson is visited by Sasha Dubrov, a famous ballet master who asks Harriet to join his company for a tour of South America, which will begin in Manaus. When Harriet brings up the idea at a family party her father refuses to let her join the tour out of fear that she'll get hurt. Professor Morton and Aunt Louisa eventually pull Harriet out of ballet believing that she'll be safer at home. Professor Morton tells Harriet that going to South America is too dangerous.

Shortly after this incident, Harriet joins Edward, Aunt Louisa and the rest of the Trumpington Tea Circle on a tour of Stavely, an old stately home which is beginning to fall into disrepair. While there, she leaves the group to explore the maze in the grounds, within which she meets Henry St. John Verney Brandon, the son of the estate's owner, reading a book entitled "Amazon Adventure". Henry tells Harriet about his own desire to travel to the Amazon, and about the book's owner - 'The Boy', who lived in the estate many years ago, and whom Henry, hearing the tales of the nurse the two shared, idolizes. Harriet, who has decided to run away to join the ballet company, promises Henry that she will search for 'The Boy' in Manaus, where he is thought to live.

Harriet then runs away by pretending to visit her friend Miss Betsy Fairfield, cancelling the visit at the last minute without her aunt's knowledge. She joins the Company and they practice for a week in Century Theatre before leaving for Manaus, where they will perform Giselle, Swan Lake, La Fille Mal Gardee, and Casse Noisette (The Nutcracker). On the first night in Manaus, Harriet's performance attracts the attention of Rom Verney, a wealthy Englishman who Harriet soon correctly suspects is 'The Boy' that Henry mentioned. The pair meet at a party Rom throws in his capacity as chairman of the Opera House trustees, and are instantly attracted to each other.

The next day, Harriet confirms that Rom used to live at Stavely, and asks him to help out there "For Henry's sake" which angers Rom - who recalls his past as the youngest son of Stavely's former owner, who, upon his father's death, was ousted by his older half brother Henry, and left by his fiancée Isobel who then married Henry. Meanwhile, in England, the elder Henry Brandon is dead, having committed suicide after bankrupting the estate, leaving Isobel widowed and penniless. She then recalls Rom, and decides to travel to Manaus to enlist his help. She is joined on the steamer by Edward, sent by Harriet's concerned father, who has discovered her deception, to bring her home in an effort to keep Harriet safe.

Isobel is delayed when Henry develops measles and the pair are forced to stop while he recovers. Edward travels on to Manaus to find Harriet; however, the ballet company form a plan to stop him. With Rom's help, they convince Edward that ballet is a perfectly respectable career, and he should convince Harriet's father to let her continue on the tour. However, Edward is then outraged when he sees Harriet burst out of a cake and dance in her underclothes at a gentleman's club - which she does only to save her friend Marie-Claude from being seen at the club by her fiancé's cousin. Edward decides to kidnap Harriet and take her back home, but she escapes with the help of Rom who has since realized the misunderstanding. 'Harriet's' Henry is, in fact, Rom's nephew whereas Rom has presumed that Harriet is talking about Rom's elder half brother, Henry, who is also 'Harriet's' Henry's father.

Forced to abandon the ballet to avoid Edward, Harriet takes refuge in Rom's house, where, at her request, they become lovers. While Harriet believes that Rom will shortly leave her, Rom intends to propose to Harriet, but is disturbed by her occasionally distant attitude, which he believes is distress at being forced to abandon her promising ballet career. Harriet returns to Manaus to say goodbye to the ballet company as they leave for the next stop on the tour, and returns to Rom's house to find Henry waiting for her there, who informs her that his mother plans to marry Rom. She leaves without saying goodbye to Rom, and returns with the ballet company to England, intending to travel on to Russia and perform. However, she is captured by her father. Professor Morton and Aunt Louisa lock Harriet in the house as punishment for many months. Professor Morton and Aunt Louisa explain that they're punishing Harriet for her own good and they're trying to protect her.

After Harriet has given up all hope, Rom finally tracks her down, having been searching since the day she disappeared. He pretends to be a doctor in order to smuggle her from her aunt's custody, and then tells her that he intends to marry her and make her the mistress of Stavely, which he has now purchased. He forces her father to give his permission, intimidating him in front of his students, who then rebel against their most boring teacher.

In the epilogue, the pair are happily married with two children, Natasha and Paul Alexander, and Harriet being pregnant with their third. Henry, who has inherited part of the estate from Rom, intends to return to Follina, Rom's home in the Amazon, and fulfill his dream of becoming an explorer. In marrying Rom, Harriet finds her freedom. Isobel has also remarried and lives in India. Edward has married a slightly violent Russian girl named Olga, a previous member of Harriet's ballet company.

The book was inspired by Juliette Roche.

== Publishing details ==
- 1985, UK, Century Press (ISBN 978-0-7126-0818-3), pub date 27 June 1985, hardback (first edition)
- 1985, USA, St. Martin's Press (ISBN 0-312-15323-6), pub date September 1985, hardback
- 2008, UK, Young Picador (ISBN 978-0-230-01484-8)
