= Eva Ibbotson =

Austro-British children's writer (1925–2010)

- Born: 21 January 1925; Vienna, Austria
- Died: 20 October 2010 (aged 85)
- Occupation: Writer
- Spouse: Alan Ibbotson (m. 1947; died 1998)
- Children: 4
- Relatives: Anna and Maria; Paul Newham and Barry Stevens (half-brothers)
- Writing career
- Period: 1965–2010
- Genres: Children's (fantasy), historical fiction, romance novels, drama,
- Notable works: Which Witch? Journey to the River Sea; The Star of Kazan
- Notable awards: Smarties Prize; 2001

Eva Maria Charlotte Michelle Ibbotson (née Wiesner; 21 January 1925 – 20 October 2010) was an Austrian-born British novelist, known for her children's literature. Some of her novels for adults have been reissued for the young adult market. The historical novel Journey to the River Sea (Macmillan, 2001) won her the Smarties Prize in category 9–11 years, garnered an unusual commendation as runner-up for the Guardian Prize, and made the Carnegie, Whitbread, and Blue Peter shortlists. She was a finalist for the 2010 Guardian Prize at the time of her death. Her last book, The Abominables, was among four finalists for the same award in 2012.

== Personal life ==
Wiesner was born in Vienna in 1925 to non-practising Jewish parents. Her father, Bertold Paul Wiesner, was a physician who pioneered human infertility treatment. He is now believed to have used his own sperm to sire perhaps 600 of the children his clinic helped to be born. Her mother, Anna Wilhelmine Gmeyner, was a successful novelist and playwright, who had worked with Bertolt Brecht and written film scripts for Georg Pabst.

Wiesner's parents separated in 1928 when she was two years old. What followed for Eva was, in her words, a "very cosmopolitan, sophisticated and quite interesting, but also very unhappy childhood, always on some train and wishing to have a home," as she later recalled. Her father took up a university lectureship in Edinburgh, while her mother left Vienna for Paris in 1933 after her work was banned by Adolf Hitler, putting a sudden end to her successful writing career.

In 1934, her mother moved to England, settling in Belsize Park, north London, and sent for her daughter. Other family members also escaped from Vienna and joined Anna and Eva Maria in England, avoiding the worst of the Nazi regime, which had already affected the family. The experience of fleeing Vienna was a strong thread throughout Ibbotson's life and work.

Wiesner attended Dartington Hall School, which she later fictionalised as Delderton Hall in her novel The Dragonfly Pool (2008). Originally, she intended to become a physiologist like her father, and earned an undergraduate degree from Bedford College, London, in 1945. During her postgraduate studies at Cambridge University, she met her future husband, Alan Ibbotson, an ecologist.

== Career ==
Eva began writing with the television drama Linda Came Today, which the British "Television Playhouse" series broadcast in December 1962. Her first English-language book was The Great Ghost Rescue, a juvenile fantasy novel published in 1975 by Macmillan in the UK and Walck in the US, with illustrations by Simon Stern and Giulio Maestro respectively.

=== Children's books ===
Ibbotson wrote more than a dozen books for children, including Which Witch?, The Secret of Platform 13, Dial-a-Ghost, Monster Mission, Journey to the River Sea, The Star of Kazan, The Beasts of Clawstone Castle, One Dog and His Boy, The Abominables and The Dragonfly Pool. She won the Nestlé Smarties Book Prize for Journey to the River Sea, and was a runner up for major awards in British children's literature several times. WorldCat libraries report holding Journey to the River Sea in more than five and ten languages respectively.

The books are imaginative and humorous, and most of them feature magical creatures and places. Ibbotson said that she disliked thinking about the supernatural, and created the characters because she wanted to decrease her readers' fear of such things. Some of the books, particularly Journey to the River Sea, also reflect Ibbotson's love of nature. She wrote Journey To The Amazon in honour of her husband, a former naturalist who had just died; the book had been in her head for years. Ibbotson had said she disliked "financial greed and a lust for power", and often created antagonists in her books who have these characteristics.

Her love of Austria is evident in works such as The Star of Kazan, A Song for Summer and Magic Flutes/The Reluctant Heiress. These books, set primarily in the Austrian countryside, display the author's love of nature.

=== Adult books ===
Charlotte was also noted for several works of fiction for adults. Several have been reissued successfully for the young adult market, some under different titles. Ibbotson was surprised by the repackaging, as she believed they were books for adults, but they have been very popular with teenage audiences. Three are The Secret Countess (originally published as A Countess Below Stairs), A Company of Swans, and Magic Flutes (in some editions published as The Reluctant Heiress)

Ibbotson's writing for adults and teens took a new direction in 1992, when she began to move toward romantic novels that dealt with the harsh realities of war and prejudice. Two of her books are set in Europe at the time of World War II and reflect her experience of the time. The first of this setting, The Morning Gift (1993), became a best-seller. Her last novel for adults was A Song for Summer (1997), also set during World War II.

== The Secret of Platform 13 and Harry Potter ==
Critics have found similarities between Ibbotson's "Platform 13" in The Secret of Platform 13 (1994) and J.K. Rowling's "Platform 9 3/4" in the Harry Potter books (from 1997), both set in King's Cross station in London. The journalist Amanda Craig has discussed the similarities: "Ibbotson would seem to have at least as good a case for claiming plagiarism as the American author currently suing J. K. Rowling but unlike her, Ibbotson says she would 'like to shake her (Rowling) by the hand. I think we all borrow from each other as writers.'"

== Marriage and family ==
Eva married Alan Ibbotson in 1947. They moved to Newcastle upon Tyne, where they raised a family of three sons and a daughter.

Appalled by the thought of having to make a career out of conducting experiments on animals, she decided to discontinue her pursuit of scientific research. She returned to college, graduating with a diploma in education in 1965 from the University of Durham. She briefly became a teacher in the 1960s before embarking on her writing career.

Ibbotson's husband died in 1998. Being "too sad to write in her usual humorous style", she then wrote her ecological classic Journey to the River Sea. She died at her home in Newcastle on 20 October 2010, having just edited the proofs of her last children's book, One Dog and his Boy, and started work on another children's ghost story to add to her long and successful series.

Through her father, Ibbotson was half-sister of the writer Paul Newham and the Canadian filmmaker Barry Stevens, but never met them.

== Published works ==
=== German language ===
These translations were published as small books in Switzerland (Zurich: Verlag die Arche).

- Der Weihnachtskarpfen (1967) (The Christmas Carp; orig. The great carp Ferdinand)
- Am Weihnachtsabend (1968) (On Christmas Eve; orig. A child this day is born)
- In den Sternen stand es geschrieben (1971) (In the stars it was written; orig. The stars that tried)

=== Children's fiction ===
- The Great Ghost Rescue (1975)
- Which Witch? (1979)
- The Worm & the Toffee Nosed Princess (1983)
- The Haunting of Hiram C. Hopgood (1987); later, The Haunting of Hiram (1988) and The Haunting of Granite Falls (2004)
- Not Just a Witch (1989)
- The Secret of Platform 13 (1994)
- Dial-a-Ghost (1996)
- Monster Mission (1999); later, and in the US, Island of the Aunts
- Journey to the River Sea (2001)
- The Star of Kazan (2004)
- The Beasts of Clawstone Castle (2005)
- The Haunting of Hiram (2008)
- The Dragonfly Pool (2008)
- The Ogre of Oglefort (2010)
- One Dog and his Boy (2010)
- The Abominables (London: Marion Lloyd Books, 2012, ISBN 978-1-4071-3297-6), published posthumously

=== Adult and young adult fiction ===
- A Countess Below Stairs (1981); later, The Secret Countess (2007)
- Magic Flutes (1982); later, The Reluctant Heiress (2009)
- A Glove Shop in Vienna: And Other Stories (1984), a collection
- A Company of Swans (1985)
- Madensky Square (1988)
- The Morning Gift (1993)
- A Song for Summer (1997)

== Awards ==
- Best Romantic Novel of the Year Published in England, Romantic Novelists Association, 1983, Magic Flutes
- Carnegie Medal

shortlist 1978, Which Witch?
shortlist 2001, Journey to the River Sea;
shortlist 2005, The Star of Kazan

- Best Books designation, School Library Journal, 1998, The Secret of Platform 13
- Nestle Smarties Book Prize

shortlist 1998, The Secret of Platform 13
winner 2001, ages 9–11 years, Journey to the River Sea
silver medal 2004, 9–11 years, The Star of Kazan

- Whitbread Children's Book of the Year, 2001 shortlist, Journey to the River Sea
- Guardian Children's Fiction Prize

highly commended runner up 2001, Journey to the River Sea
shortlist 2010, The Ogre of Oglefort, 28 May, 17 Sep.
shortlist 2012, The Abominables

== Film and television ==
- Ibbotson wrote Linda Came Today (1962) for television
- In 1978, she wrote Der Große Karpfen Ferdinand und andere Weihnachtsgeschichten for German television.
- In 2004 Enda Walsh was adapting Island of the Aunts for a feature film.
- A film adaptation of The Great Ghost Rescue was completed in 2011, directed by the French Yann Samuell.
- The Haunting of Hiram C. Hopgood was adapted by Gail Gilchriest.
