= The Battle of the Somme (film) =

1916 British film by Geoffrey Malins and John McDowell

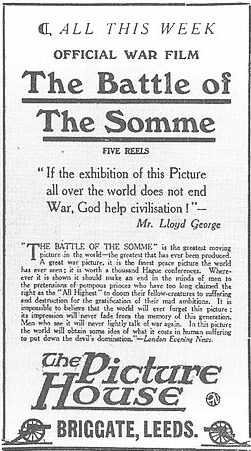
- Yorkshire Evening Post advert for the film, 1916
- Directed by: Geoffrey Malins
- Produced by: W. F. Jury
- Cinematography: Geoffrey Malins; J. B. McDowell
- Edited by: Charles Urban; G. H. Malins
- Music by: J. Morton Hutcheson (original 1916 medley); Laura Rossi (2006)
- Distributed by: British Topical Committee for War Films
- Release date: 21 August 1916
- Running time: 74 minutes
- Country: United Kingdom
- Languages: Silent film English intertitles

The Battle of the Somme (US title, Kitchener's Great Army in the Battle of the Somme), is a 1916 British documentary and propaganda war film, shot by two official cinematographers, Geoffrey Malins and John McDowell. The film depicts the British Expeditionary Force during the preliminaries and early days of the Battle of the Somme (1 July – 18 November 1916). The film premièred in London on 10 August 1916 and was released generally on 21 August. The film shows trench warfare, marching infantry, artillery firing on German positions, British troops waiting to attack on 1 July, the treatment of wounded British and German soldiers, British and German dead and captured German equipment and positions. A scene during which British troops crouch in a ditch then "go over the top" was staged for the camera behind the lines.

The film was a great success, watched by about 20 million people in Britain in the first six weeks of exhibition and distributed in eighteen countries. A second film, covering a later phase of the battle, was released in 1917 as The Battle of the Ancre and the Advance of the Tanks. In 1920, the film was preserved in the film archive of the Imperial War Museum. In 2005, it was inscribed on UNESCO's Memory of the World Register, digitally restored and was released on DVD in 2008. The Battle of the Somme is significant as an early example of film propaganda, a historical record of the battle and as a popular source of footage illustrating the First World War.

== Content ==
The Battle of the Somme is a black-and-white silent film in five parts, with sequences divided by intertitles summarising the contents. The first part shows preparations for the battle; there are sequences of troops marching towards the front, French peasants at work in rear areas, the stockpiling of munitions, Major-General Beauvoir De Lisle addresses the 29th Division and some of the preparatory bombardment by 18-pounder, 60-pounder and 4.7-inch guns, 6-inch, 9.2-inch howitzers and 2-inch mortars is shown.

Kitchener's Great Army in the Battle of the Somme (1916)

The second part depicts more preparations, troops moving into front line trenches, the intensification of the artillery barrage by 12-inch and 15-inch howitzers, a 9.45-inch heavy mortar and the detonation of the mine under the Hawthorn Ridge Redoubt. Part three begins with the attack on the First day on the Somme (1 July 1916), with some re-enactments and shows the recovery of British wounded and German prisoners. The fourth part shows more scenes of British and German wounded the clearing of the battlefield and some of the aftermath. The final part shows scenes of devastation, including the ruins of the village of Mametz, British troops at rest and preparations for the next stage of the advance.

== Production ==
=== Background ===
On 2 November 1915, the British Topical Committee for War Films, representing British newsreel producers and supported by the War Office, despatched two cameramen to France. Geoffrey Malins of Gaumont British and Edward Tong of Jury's Imperial Pictures, were to shoot footage for short newsreels. By early June Tong had fallen ill and been sent home but he and Malins had made five series of newsreels, which although well-received, had failed to impress the British cinema trade. John McDowell, of the British & Colonial film company, volunteered to replace Tong and left for France on 23 June 1916. On 24 June, the British and French armies began the preparatory artillery bombardment of German positions for the Battle of the Somme.

=== Photography ===
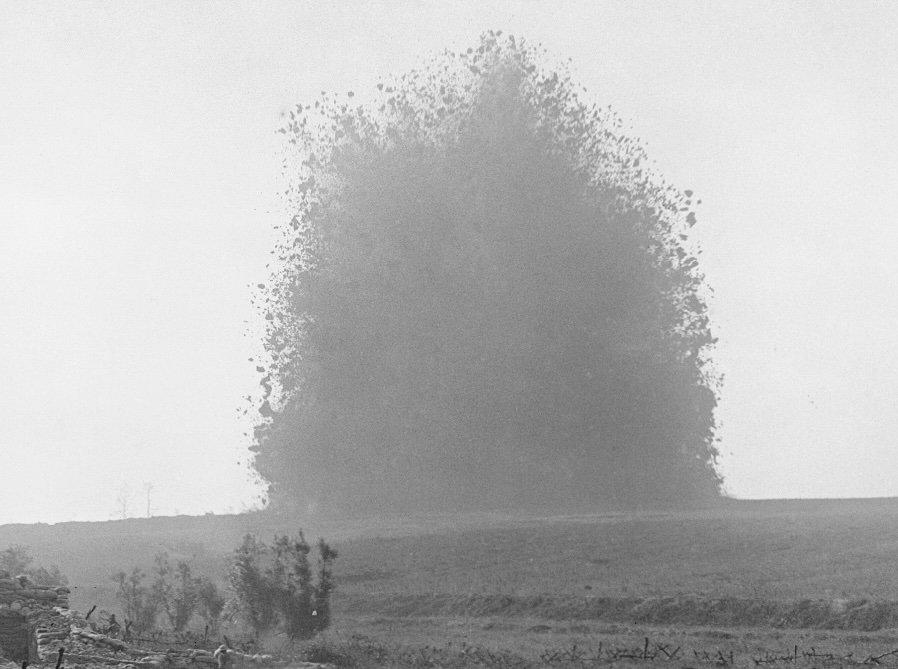
Hawthorn Ridge Redoubt mine, 1 July 1916. Photograph by Ernest Brooks. Hawthorn Ridge crater November 1916, photograph by Ernest Brooks (Note: "The ground where I stood gave a mighty convulsion. It rocked and swayed. I gripped hold of my tripod to steady myself. Then for all the world like a gigantic sponge, the earth rose high in the air to the height of hundreds of feet. Higher and higher it rose, and with a horrible grinding roar the earth settles back upon itself, leaving in its place a mountain of smoke.")

Malins and McDowell shot the film between 26 June and from 7 to 9 July. Malins filmed in the vicinity of Beaumont Hamel, on attachment with the 29th Division (VIII Corps); McDowell worked further south near Fricourt and Mametz with the 7th Division (XV Corps). Before the battle, Malins worked at the north end of the British Somme sector, photographing troops on the march and heavy artillery west of Gommecourt. De Lisle suggested to Malins that he view the bombardment of Beaumont Hamel from Jacob's Ladder, near White City, an abrupt drop down the side of a valley, with about 25 steps cut into the ground, showing up white because of the chalk. Sappers had dug the large mine under Hawthorn Ridge in front of White City. German shells were falling as Malins made his way to Lanwick Street Trench; he had to rise above the parapet to remove sandbags and then set up his camera, which was camouflaged with sackcloth.

Malins returned to film the speech by de Lisle to the 2nd Royal Fusiliers, after which Malins heard of the postponement of the battle for 48 hours. Malins returned to White City to film the bombardment of the Hawthorn Ridge Redoubt by trench mortars, during which there were three misfires which destroyed a trench-mortar position nearby. On 1 July, Malins filmed troops of the 1st Battalion Lancashire Fusiliers waiting to advance at Beaumont Hamel from a sunken lane in no man's land, which had been occupied by digging a 2 ft × 5 ft (0.61 m × 1.52 m) tunnel overnight. Malins then went back to Jacob's Ladder to film the explosion of the Hawthorn Ridge mine. At 7:19 a.m., Malins began filming and the mine detonation shook the ground as troops of Royal Engineers advanced on either side to occupy the crater.

Later in the day, a shell explosion damaged the camera tripod; Malins repaired it and in the evening filmed roll-calls. Next day Malins shot film at La Boisselle before leaving for London around 9 July. Malins returned to France and from 12 to 19 July filmed sequences of shellfire and of troops advancing from trenches, staged for the camera at a Third Army mortar school near St Pol. McDowell reached the Somme front after Malins and began filming British preparations on 28 or 29 June, to the east of Albert. He covered the opening day of the battle from the vicinity of Carnoy and from the dressing-station at Minden Post. The success of the 7th Division enabled McDowell to film captured German trenches near Fricourt and Mametz.

=== Editing ===
On 10 July, Brigadier-General John Charteris reported to the War Office that some 8,000 ft (2,400 m) of footage had been shot and recommended that sections of film should be released as soon as possible. Footage was first viewed as a negative on 12 July and Charles Urban is thought to have begun work on the film as editor, with the assistance of Malins. Urban later claimed to have proposed that the film be issued as a feature film rather than in short sections. The change in format was agreed with the British Topical Committee for War Films and a 5,000 ft (1,500 m) cut of the film was ready by 19 July. Much of the footage was censored from the public version as the War Office wanted the film to contain images that would support the war effort and raise morale. A 77-minute version was ready by 31 July and a rough cut was screened at the British Expeditionary Force (BEF) General Headquarters (GHQ) at Montreuil, Pas-de-Calais and at the Fourth Army headquarters. The commander Lieutenant-General Henry Rawlinson said "some of it is very good but it cut out many of the horrors in dead and wounded". The film was shown to the Secretary of State for War, David Lloyd George, on 2 August and members of the cinema trade late on 7 August, the day that the film received final approval for release.

=== Release ===
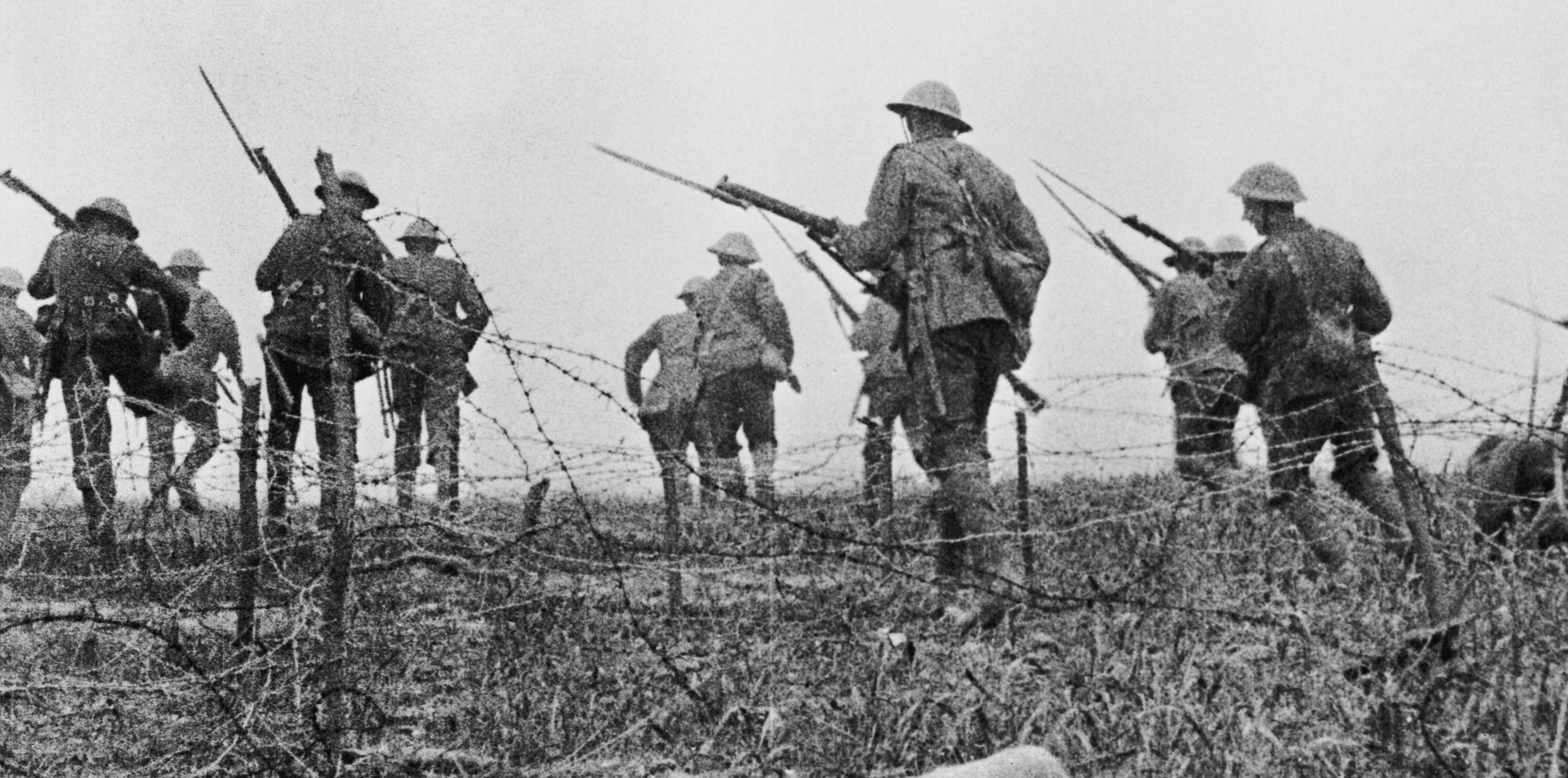
Scene of British troops advancing, staged for the film

The film comprises five reels and is 77 minutes long. The first screening took place on 10 August 1916 at the Scala Theatre, to an audience of journalists, Foreign Office officials, cinema trade figures and officers of the Imperial General Staff. The screening was preceded by the reading of a letter from Lloyd George, exhorting the audience to "see that this picture, which is in itself an epic of self-sacrifice and gallantry, reaches everyone. Herald the deeds of our brave men to the ends of the earth. This is your duty".

A musical medley with excerpts from classical, folk, contemporary and popular pieces, to be played in cinemas by accompanying musicians, was devised by J. Morton Hutcheson and published in The Bioscope on 17 August 1916. On 21 August, the film began showing simultaneously in thirty-four London cinemas and opened in provincial cities the following week, when the film was shown simultaneously at twenty cinemas in Birmingham, at least twelve cinemas in Glasgow and Edinburgh, six cinemas in Cardiff and three in Leeds. The Royal Family received a private screening at Windsor Castle on 2 September; the film was exhibited in more than eighteen countries.

== Reception ==
=== Britain ===
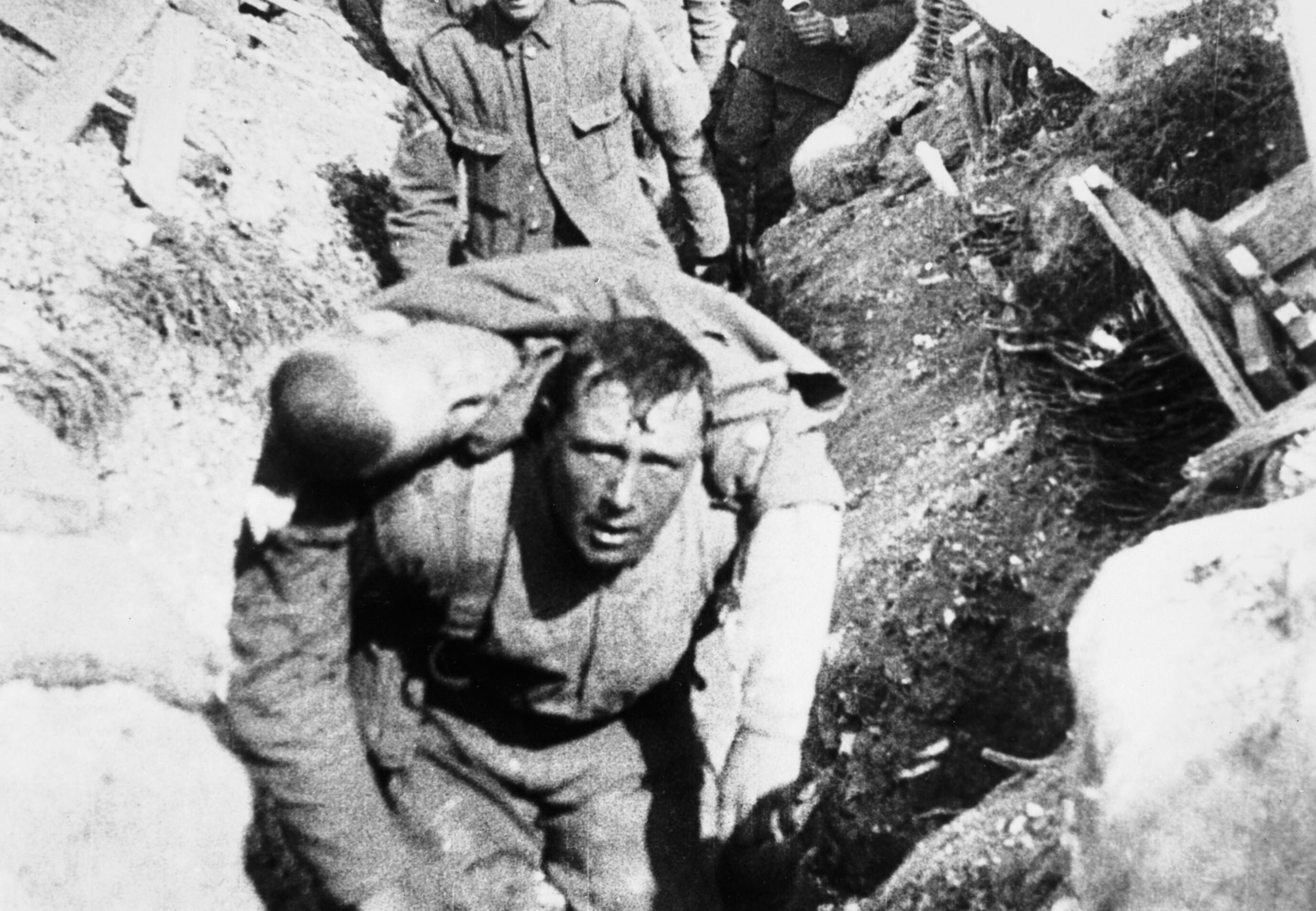
Frame from sequence 34: British Tommies rescuing a comrade under shell fire. (This man died 30 minutes after reaching the trenches.) (Note: Smither described this sequence as a symbol of the First World War, "one of the most famous images in the Imperial War Museum's collections" and that the identity of the "trench rescuer" is unknown.)

The popularity of the film was unprecedented and cinemas played the film for longer runs than usual, often to packed houses, while some arranged additional screenings to meet demand. The film is thought to have achieved attendance figures of twenty million in its first six weeks of release. The film also attracted more middle-class audiences, some of whom had never been to a cinema before. William Jury, as the film's booking director, initially charged exhibitors £40, with the fee decreasing by £5 a week; after two months, a reduced fee of £6 for three nights put the film within the price range of village halls wishing to show the film. By October 1916, the film had been booked by more than two thousand cinemas in Britain, earning over £30,000. British authorities showed the film to the public as a morale-booster and in general it met with a favourable reception. The Times reported on 22 August that

Crowded audiences ... were interested and thrilled to have the realities of war brought so vividly before them, and if women had sometimes to shut their eyes to escape for a moment from the tragedy of the toll of battle which the film presents, opinion seems to be general that it was wise that the people at home should have this glimpse of what our soldiers are doing and daring and suffering in Picardy.

— The Times, 22 August 1916

Some members of the audience considered it immoral to portray scenes of violence; Hensley Henson, the Dean of Durham, protested "against an entertainment which wounds the heart and violates the very sanctity of bereavement". Others complained that such a serious film shared the cinema programme with comedy films. On 28 August, the Yorkshire Evening Post printed the comment, attributed to Lloyd George, "If the exhibition of this Picture all over the world does not end War, God help civilisation". The film was shown to British troops in France from 5 September; Lieutenant-Colonel Rowland Feilding, an officer who saw the film in a muddy field near Morlancourt, described it as "a wonderful and most realistic production" but criticised the film for failing to record the sound of rifles and machine-guns, although there was an artillery accompaniment from guns firing nearby. Feilding suggested that the film could reassure new recruits, by giving them some idea of what to expect in battle; the intertitles were forthright, describing images of injury and death.

=== International ===
The film was shown in New Zealand in October 1916. On 12 October, the Wellington Evening Post ran an advertisement for the film, describing it as "the extraordinary films of 'the big push' and "an awe-inspiring, glorious presentation of what our heroes are accomplishing today". In a review published on 16 October, it was written that "these pictures of the Battle of the Somme are a real and valuable contribution to the nation's knowledge and a powerful spur to national effort". The film premièred in Australia on 13 October at Hoyt's Picture Theatre in Melbourne. The Melbourne Argus considered that after the attack sequence, "... you are not in a Melbourne picture theatre, but in the very forefront of the Somme battle" and called the film "this moving reality of battle".

The film and its reception attracted great interest in Germany, which was able to read a report from a neutral reporter in London, filed in the Berliner Tageblatt. British cinema was said to be taking a serious view of the war, helped by the government, which had arranged for the production of "real war films", The Battle of the Somme was "absorbing" and had attracted huge audiences. German troops recovered a letter from a British civilian, who had seen the film on 26 August and written to a soldier in France, describing the issue of a leaflet to each filmgoer that stated that the film was not entertainment but an official film. Having viewed the film, the writer was sure that it would enlighten the audience in a way never before achieved.

=== Other films ===
During the second week of August, King George V, the Prime Minister H. H. Asquith and Lloyd George toured the Western Front and were filmed by Malins. The War Office released the film in October as The King Visits His Armies in the Great Advance. Malins made a third film The Battle of the Ancre and the Advance of the Tanks which opened in January 1917. (Note: "I'd like to see a tank come down the stalls/Lurching to rag-time tunes, or 'Home sweet home'/And there'd be no more jokes in Music-halls/To mock the riddled corpses round Bapaume." (Siegfried Sassoon, Blighters 1917).) In the same month a German film With our Heroes on the Somme was shown but "lacked the immediacy" of the British film, being re-enactments at training establishments behind the lines, which received a lukewarm reception. A booklet to accompany the film proclaimed that it depicted "the German will in war" and implied that the enemies of Germany were using colonial troops to undermine "German honour". Malins' final feature film The German Retreat and the Battle of Arras was released in June 1917, showing the destruction of Péronne and the first British troops across the Somme, following-up the German withdrawal; the film failed to attract the audiences of 1916.

== Preservation ==
In 1920, the original nitrate negative was passed to the Imperial War Museum for preservation. A nitrate protection archive master was made in 1921 and an acetate safety master in 1931. The nitrate masters were destroyed in the 1970s after the onset of irreversible nitrate decomposition. Excerpts have been taken for television documentaries, including The Great War (1964. BBC), The Great War and the Shaping of the 20th Century (1996, PBS) and The First World War (2003, Channel 4). The film was offered on VHS in 1987, the first title from the Imperial War Museum film archive to be released on video. In 2005, The Battle of the Somme was inscribed on UNESCO's Memory of the World Register for the preservation of global documentary heritage. The film was described by UNESCO as a "compelling documentary record of one of the key battles of the First World War [and] the first feature-length documentary film record of combat produced anywhere in the world" and had "played a major part in establishing the methodology of documentary and propaganda film."

== Recent screenings ==
On 22 October 2006, after a film restoration project, a refined version of the film was screened at the Queen Elizabeth Hall in London, accompanied by the Philharmonia Orchestra performing an original orchestral score by Laura Rossi. The restoration was later nominated for an Archive Restoration or Preservation Project award by the Federation of Commercial Audiovisual Libraries. In November 2008, the restored film was released on DVD, to mark the 90th anniversary of the Armistice with Germany in 1918. The DVD included the score by Laura Rossi, an accompanying 1916 musical medley, a commentary by Roger Smither, a film archivist at the Imperial War Museum and interviews with Smither, Rossi, Toby Haggith (film archivist) and Stephen Horne (silent film musician) on the reconstruction of the contemporary medley; film fragments and missing scenes were also included in the DVD.

In 2012, with the support of the Imperial War Museum, there were public screenings of the restored film accompanied by a live orchestra playing the soundtrack of Rossi's music. Somme100 FILM has a target of a hundred performances of the film by amateur and professional orchestras in the centenary year, between July 2016 and July 2017.

== See also ==
- War film
- History of the United Kingdom during the First World War#Media
