= The Cottage (film) =

- UK theatrical poster
- Directed by: Paul Andrew Williams
- Written by: Paul Andrew Williams
- Produced by: Ken Marshall; Martin Pope
- Starring: Andy Serkis; Reece Shearsmith; Steve O'Donnell; Jennifer Ellison
- Cinematography: Christopher Ross
- Edited by: Tom Hemmings
- Music by: Laura Rossi
- Production companies: Isle of Man Film; UK Film Council; Screen Yorkshire; Steel Mill Pictures
- Distributed by: Pathé
- Release date: 14 March 2008
- Running time: 92 minutes
- Country: United Kingdom
- Language: English

The Cottage is a 2008 British black comedy horror film, written and directed by Paul Andrew Williams.

== Plot ==
Two bickering brothers, David and Peter, kidnap Tracey, the stepdaughter of Arnie, an underworld crime boss, aided by Andrew, Arnie's dimwitted son. At a secluded country cottage, the two retrieve her from the car boot and tie her to the bed frame.

Andrew delivers the ransom. However, instead of money, the bag is filled with napkins. David and Peter suspects that Arnie knew about Andrew's involvement in the scheme.

After Peter accidentally dropping David's phone in water, David goes down to the village to use a telephone box. He happens across some sinister locals who, upon learning he is staying at the Barnarby Cottage, warn him to keep his doors locked and not to wander. Disturbed, David returns to the cottage to find that Tracey has incapacitated Andrew and abducted Peter.

Some distance away, Peter and Tracey arrive at an ominous-looking farm. Upon entering the house, they discover it to be the home of a deformed serial killer known as the Farmer.

In the kitchen, the Farmer stabs Tracey in the stomach. Peter incapacitates the Farmer with a shovel, but is reluctant to kill him, despite Tracey's urging. As the two of them argue, the Farmer comes to and maims Peter's foot. As he prepares to kill Peter, Tracey mocks him, urging him to hurry up. Annoyed, the Farmer turns around and shoves the shovel into her mouth, half-decapitating. He then knocks out Peter and hangs him by his jacket on a meat hook in the shed.

Meanwhile, Andrew and David discover Steven, Andrew's hairdresser, dying from being disemboweled. Navigating the woods in search of Peter and Tracey, they stumble across the corpse of Arnie's henchman, dead by a slit throat. They arrive at the farm, where they discover a shed full of severed heads. The two hurry outside, where the Farmer pins David to the ground with a pickaxe through his leg. The Farmer chases down Andrew, viciously attacking him before ripping out his spine.

Peter comes to, frees himself and crawls to David. After making up for a lifetime of squabbling, they vow to fight on and drag themselves into the farmhouse in search of a phone. The Farmer soon reappears, tossing Andrew's severed head and spine through the window. David attempts to defend his brother, only to be suddenly impaled by The Farmer with the pickaxe. Angered, Peter ties a length of rope over the Farmer's neck and begins to strangle him.

The Farmer tosses Peter down the cellar stair and closes shut the trap door. As Peter continues pulling on the rope, the Farmer collapses on the trap door, trapping Peter. With nowhere else to go, he descends into the cellar. Flicking his lighter, he sees the Farmer's equally hideous wife and daughters surrounding him. He resigns to his fate as the lighter goes out and they attack him.

The next morning, Arnie and his right-hand men arrive at the farm. As they step up to the front door, the Farmer, armed with the pickaxe, suddenly rushes out at them.

== Cast ==
- Andy Serkis as David
- Reece Shearsmith as Peter
- Steve O'Donnell as Andrew
- Jennifer Ellison as Tracey
- David Legeno as The Farmer
- Steven Berkoff as Arnie (uncredited)
- Johnny Harris as Smoking Joe (uncredited)
- Danny Nussbaum as Man in Suit
- Logan Wong as Muk Li San
- Jonathan Chan-Pensley as Chun Yo Fu
- Simon Schatzberger as Steven
- James Bierman as Bouncer
- Cat Meacher as Club Receptionist
- Doug Bradley as Villager with Dog
- Katy Murphy as Farmer's Wife
- Georgia Groome as Farmer's Daughter 1
- Eden Watson as Farmer's Daughter 2

== Reception ==
The Cottage received positive reviews from critics, garnering a 71% rating on Rotten Tomatoes. Variety, ReelFilm, and MovieFone gave mostly positive reviews, with MovieFone criticizing the film's pacing issues but praising the film's acting and banter.

Empire also reviewed the film, stating "Frightfest regulars and hungry gorehounds will get a kick out of this, but those who hailed Williams as a Brit-indie visionary after London To Brighton might be left scratching their heads."
