= Laura Rossi =

British composer

Laura Rossi is a British composer of film and concert works. Originally from Devon, she graduated with a master's degree from the London College of Music, having previously studied at the University of Liverpool.

== Work ==
Her credits include scores for films including Paul Andrew Williams's London to Brighton and The Cottage, Song for Marion and The Eichmann Show.

Rossi has scored music for many silent films such as Silent Shakespeare and Jane Shore for the British Film Institute. She was commissioned by the Imperial War Museum in 2006 to write an orchestral score to accompany the digitally restored 1916 film The Battle of the Somme. In the centenary year, 100 live orchestral screenings of the film with Rossi's score took place worldwide to mark the 100th anniversary of the Battle.

In 2014, Rossi's work Voices of Remembrance, inspired by ten of World War I's most famous poems, was recorded with the Chamber Orchestra of London with readings by Vanessa Redgrave and Ralph Fiennes.

Rossi is working as a lecturer in Film Music at the London Film Academy.

== Filmography ==
- Hurricane (2018)
- The Eichmann Show (2015)
- Unfinished Song (2013)
- The Battle of the Ancre (2012)
- Song for Marion (2012)
- Me or the Dog (2011)
- The Firm (2009)
- Broken Lines (2008)
- The Cottage (2008)
- The Battle of the Somme (2006)
- London to Brighton (2006)
- Ninety Days (2005)
- Shooting Shona (2004)
- It's Okay to Drink Whiskey (2004)
