= 4.5-inch gun M1 =

4.5 inch gun M1 on carriage M1
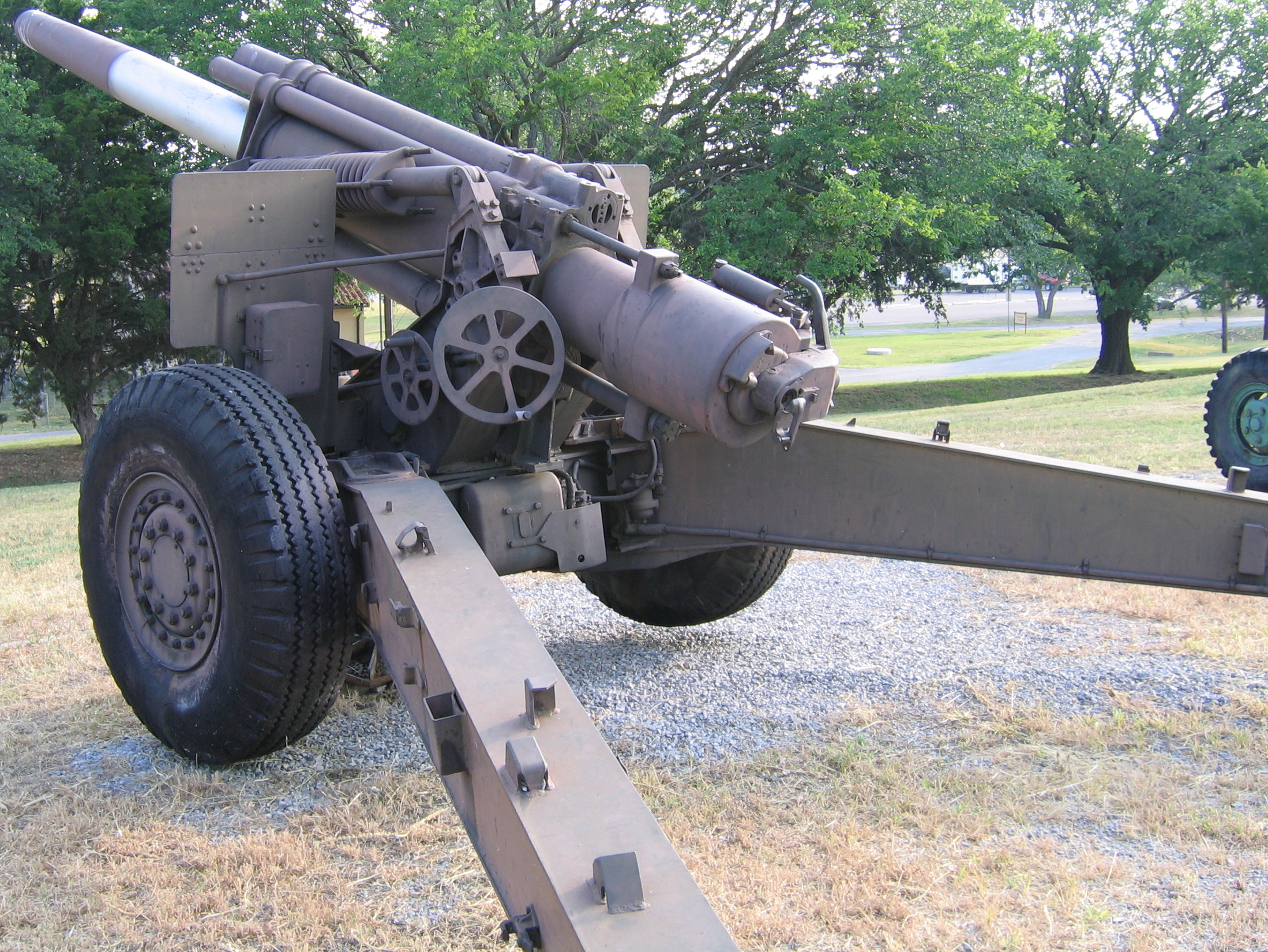
- 4.5 inch gun M1 at the U.S. Army Field Artillery Museum, Ft. Sill, Oklahoma
- Type: Field gun
- Place of origin: United States

Service history
- In service: 1942–1945
- Used by: United States
- Wars: World War II

Production history
- Designed: 1939–1941
- Produced: September 1942–February 1944
- No. built: 426

Specifications
- Mass: 5,654 kg (12,465 lbs)
- Length: 8.15 m (27 ft)
- Barrel length: Bore: 4.756 m (15 ft 7 in) L/41.6; Overall: 4.918 m (16 ft 2 in) L/43
- Width: 2.4 m (7 ft 10 in)
- Height: 2.12 m (6 ft 11 in)
- Shell: separate-loading bagged charge
- Caliber: 114 mm / 4.5 inch
- Breech: interrupted screw
- Recoil: hydro-pneumatic
- Carriage: split trail
- Elevation: 0° to +65°
- Traverse: 53°
- Rate of fire: Burst: 4 rounds per minute Sustained: 1 round per minute
- Muzzle velocity: 693 m/s (2,274 ft/s)
- Maximum firing range: 19,317 m (21,125 yds)
- Sights: panoramic, M12

The 4.5 inch gun M1 was a field gun developed in the United States in the beginning of World War II. It shared the same carriage with the 155mm howitzer M1 and fired the same ammunition as the British BL 4.5-inch medium field gun. Beginning in 1944, the weapon was used by the U.S. Army as corps-level artillery; with the end of hostilities, it was declared obsolete.

== Development and production ==
In 1920 the US Army Ordnance Department started to work on a new medium field gun. Since the US Army had already employed the 4.7-inch gun M1906 prior to World War I, and during the war in limited numbers, this caliber was also selected for the new weapon. The development resulted in the 4.7-inch gun M1922E on carriage M1921E. Because of lack of funding, the design never reached production.

In 1939 the program was restarted; the renewed design, designated the 4.7-inch gun T3, was ready by early 1940. It utilized the same carriage as the concurrently developed 155 mm howitzer. At this stage, the Army decided to change the caliber of the weapon to use British 4.5-inch ammunition. The modified gun was standardized in April 1941 as the 4.5-inch gun M1 on carriage M1.

Production started in September 1942 and continued until February 1944.

Production of M1
Year	1942	1943	1944	Total
Produced, pcs.	41	345	40	426

== Variants ==
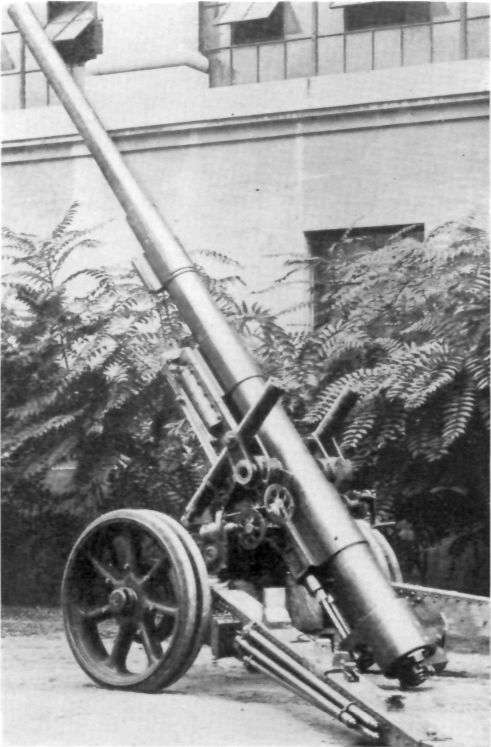
4.7-inch gun M1920 on carriage M1920 in battery

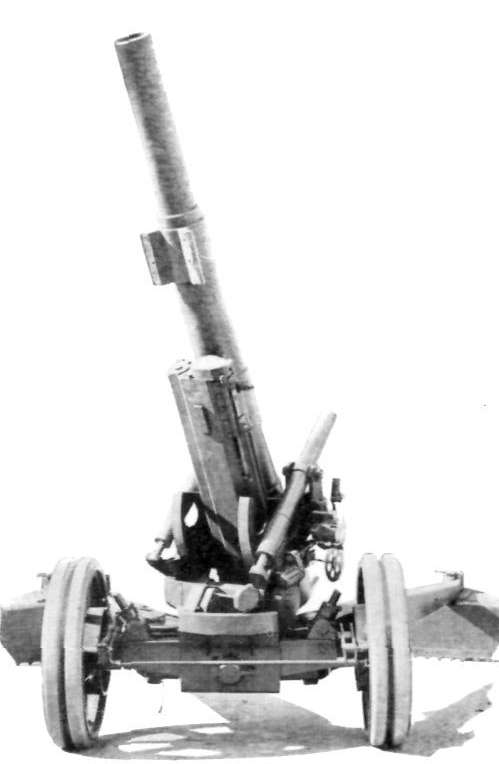
155 mm howitzer on the same carriage from the front

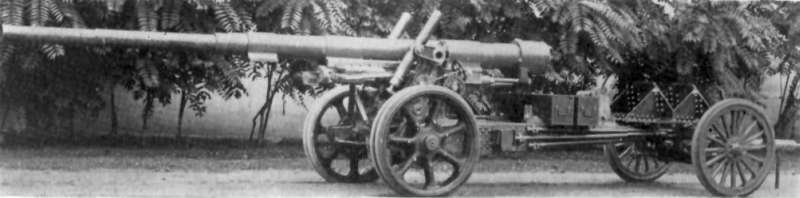
The 4.7-inch gun in travelling position

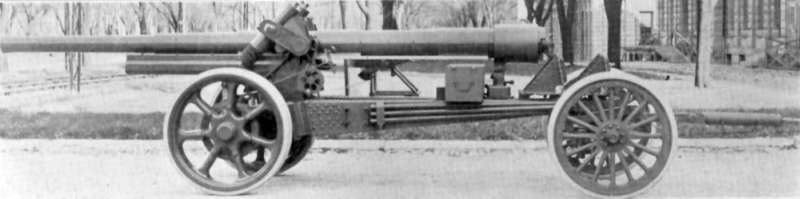
4.7-inch gun M1922E on carriage M1921E in travelling position

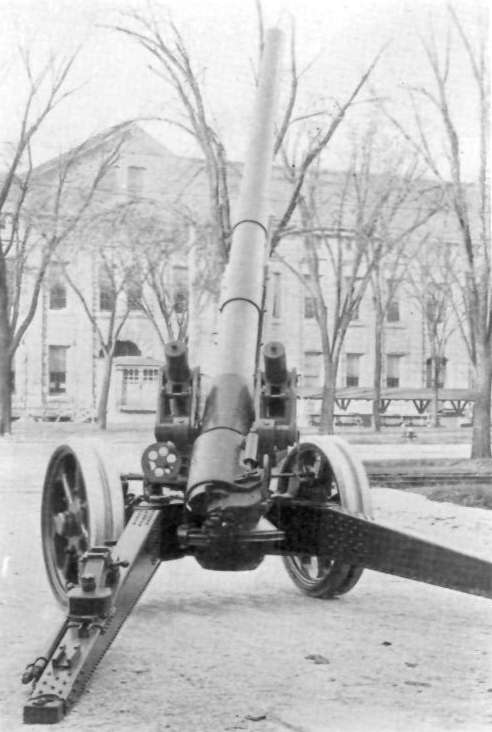
The same gun in firing position

External image
- 4.5 inch GMC T16.

- 4.7-inch gun M1920 on carriage M1920 with 65-degree maximal elevation (the carriage was also designed to be used with 155-mm howitzer) weighing 13,000 pounds (5,900 kg).
- 4.7-inch gun M1922E on carriage M1921E of a similar design and same ballistics, but with 45-degree maximal elevation and lighter, just 10,600 pounds (4,800 kg).
- 4.7-inch gun T3 (1940).
- 4.5-inch gun M1 on carriage M1 (1941).

The weapon was experimentally mounted on a lengthened chassis of the M5 light tank, in mount M1. The resulting vehicle received the designation 4.5 in gun motor carriage T16. A single prototype was built.

== Description ==
The M1 was very similar in construction and appearance to the 155mm howitzer M1. The only significant difference was its tube of 4.5 inch (114 mm) caliber. The tube had uniform right hand twist, with one turn in 32 calibers. The unbalanced weight of the barrel was supported by two equilibrator springs. The breach was of interrupted screw type; the recoil system hydro-pneumatic, variable length. The carriage was of split trail type, unsprung and had wheels with pneumatic tires. In firing position, the weapon was supported by a retractable pedestal. The gun was equipped with M12 panoramic sight.

== Service ==
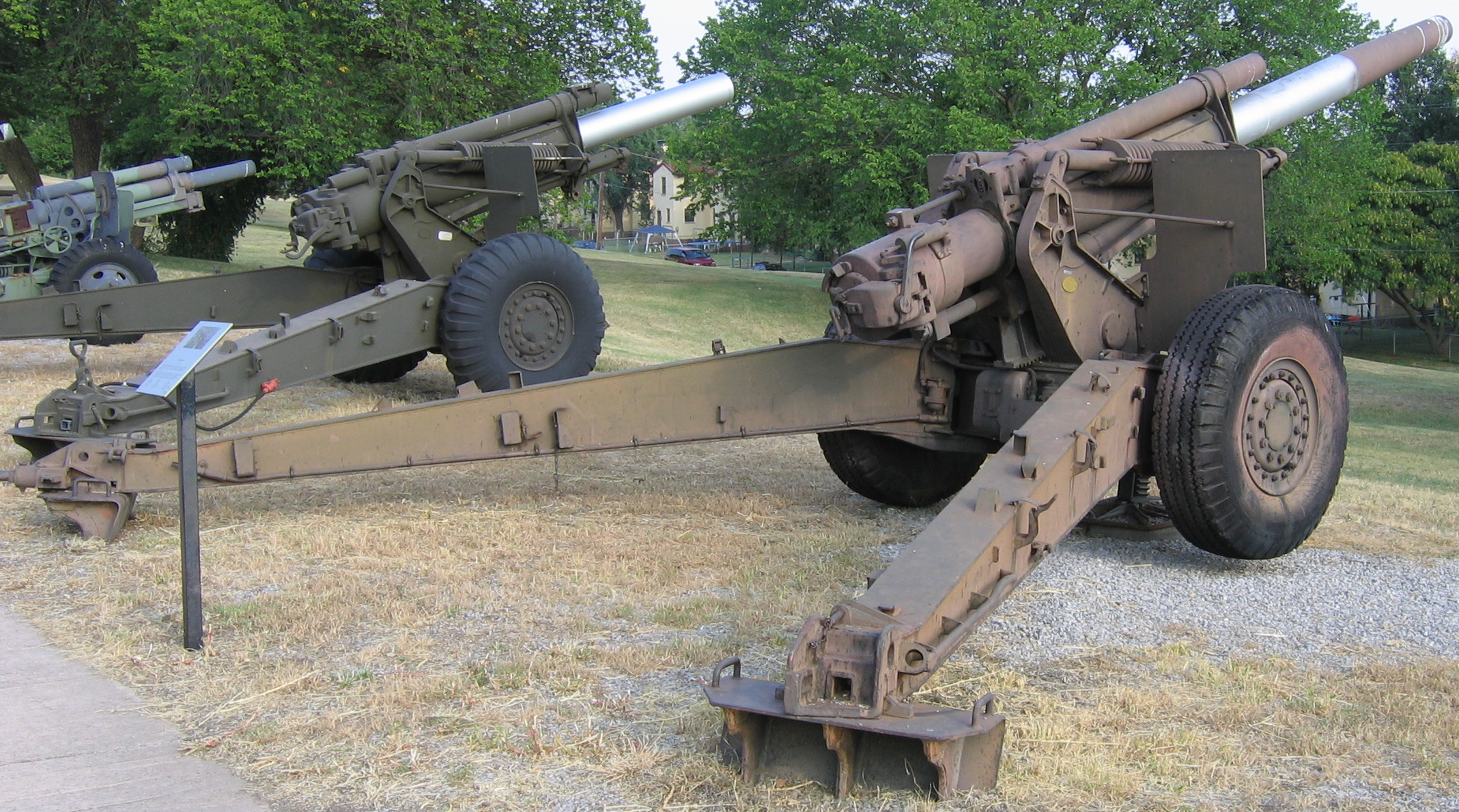
155 mm howitzer M1 (left) and 4.5-inch gun M1 (right) at the U.S. Army Field Artillery Museum, Ft. Sill, OK. Note the similarity between the two pieces.

The M1 equipped 16 field artillery battalions in Northwest Europe; the 172nd, 176th, 199th, 211th, 259th, 770th through 775th, 777th, 935th, 939th, 941st, and 959th.

It was employed for corps support. The M5 high-speed tractor was assigned as prime mover. The weapon was declared obsolete in September 1945. The gun had good range, longer than the World War I-era 155 mm gun M1918MI, and nearly five kilometers longer than its 155 mm howitzer sibling. It was out-ranged by the newer 155 mm gun M1, but this weapon was nearly three times heavier. On the other hand, the 4.5-inch gun was criticized for the insufficient power of its high-explosive shell. The shell was produced from low grade ("19 ton") steel, which necessitated thick walls. As a result, it carried only about two kilograms of TNT or substitute, less than the 105 mm high-explosive shell. Additionally, it was felt that having a small number of guns of an atypical caliber unnecessarily complicated logistics.

== Ammunition ==
The M1 utilized separate loading, bagged charge ammunition. Only high explosive projectile was available.

The projectile could be fired with propelling charge M7 (normal) at reduced velocity or with propelling charge M8 (super) to achieve full velocity. The dummy propelling charge M6 simulated the M8 charge. The velocity and range data in the table below is for the M8 charge.

Available ammunition.
Type	Model	Projectile weight, kg	Filler	Muzzle velocity, m/s	Range, m
HE	HE M65 Shell	24.9	TNT, 2.04 kg or Amatol 50/50, 1.85 kg or Trimonite, 2.10 kg	693	19,317
Dummy	Dummy M8 Projectile			-	-

Propelling charges
Model	Weight, complete, kg	Components
M7 (normal)	2.95	Single section
M8 (super)	5.08	Base charge and increment
M6 (dummy)	5.40	Base charge and increment

Concrete penetration, mm
Ammunition \ Distance, m	0	914	4,572	9,144
HE M65 Shell (meet angle 0°)	1,158	1,067	640	366
Different methods of measurement were used in different countries / periods. Therefore, direct comparison is often impossible.

== See also ==
- Field artillery
- List of U.S. Army weapons by supply catalog designation – Item C38
- BL 4.5-inch Medium Field Gun – British weapon using same ammunition
