= Broken Lines =

- Directed by: Sallie Aprahamian
- Screenplay by: Dan Fredenburgh; Doraly Rosa
- Produced by: Douglas Cummins
- Starring: Paul Bettany; Olivia Williams
- Cinematography: Jean-Louis Bompoint
- Edited by: Brand Thumim
- Music by: Laura Rossi
- Release date: 2008
- Country: United Kingdom
- Language: English

Broken Lines is a 2008 British romantic drama film directed by Sallie Aprahamian, in her feature directorial debut. It stars Paul Bettany, Dan Fredenburgh, Olivia Williams and Doraly Rosa. It premiered at the 65th Venice International Film Festival.

== Cast ==
- Paul Bettany as Chester
- Olivia Williams as Zoe
- Dan Fredenburgh as Jake
- Doraly Rosa as B
- Rita Tushingham as Rae
- Harriet Walter as Leah
- Nathan Constance as Yoss
- Nicholas Le Prevost as Alistair
- Steve Toussaint as Physio
- Sidney Kean as David

== Production ==
Dan Fredenburgh and Doraly Rosa began developing the screenplay in 2004, presenting it to Aprahamian in 2006. The film was produced by Axiom Films, with Aria Films and Matador Pictures serving as co-producers, on a budget of £1.1 million.

== Release ==
The film premiered at the 65th edition of the Venice Film Festival, in the Venice Days sidebar. It was theatrically released in United Kingdom on 30 September 2011.

== Reception ==
On the review aggregator website Rotten Tomatoes, 63% of 8 critics' reviews are positive.
