= BL 4.5-inch medium field gun =

BL 4.5 inch medium gun
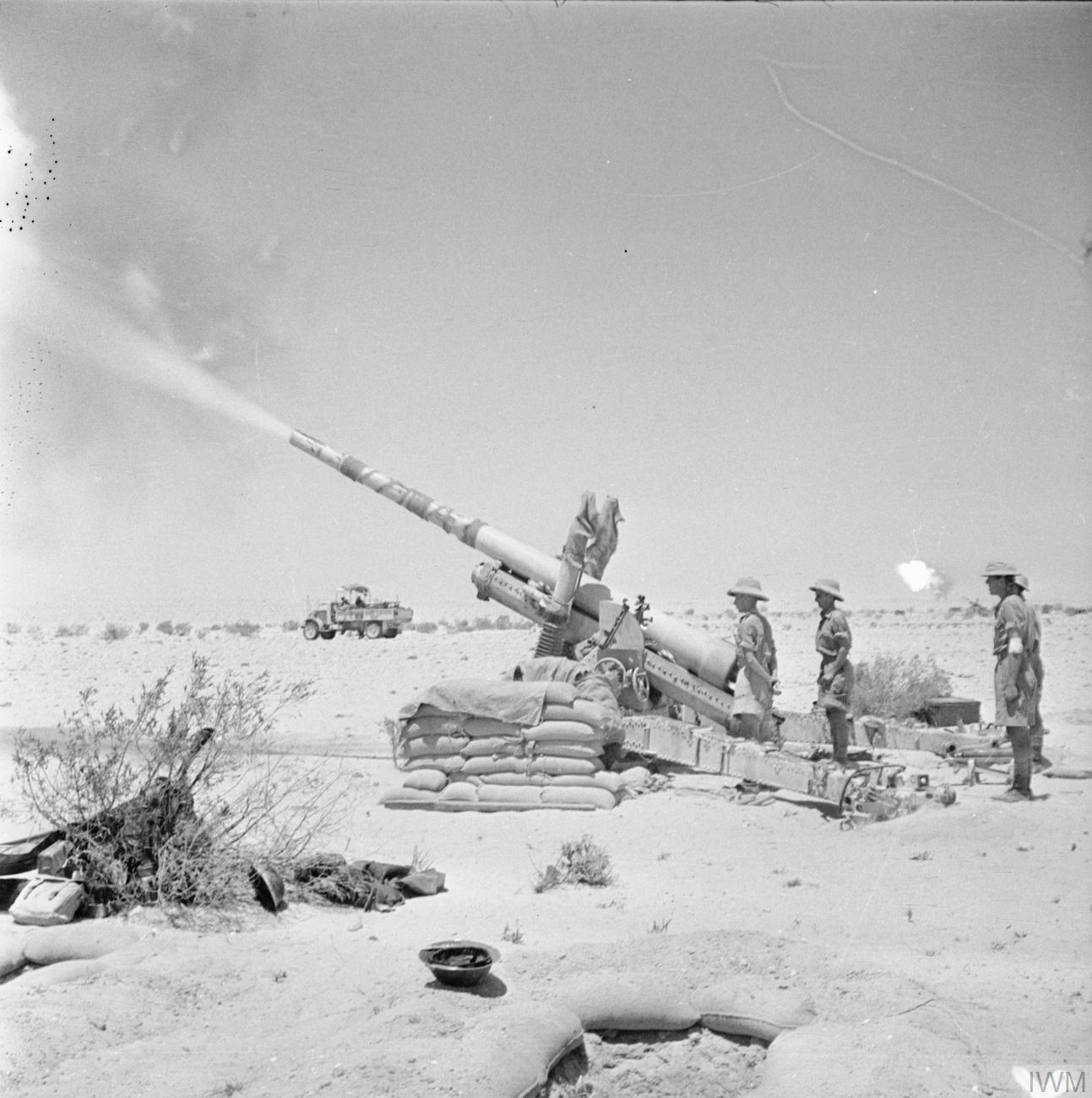
- 4.5 inch medium field gun in action in July 1942
- Type: Medium gun
- Place of origin: United Kingdom

Service history
- Used by: United Kingdom, Canada, Portugal
- Wars: World War II; Portuguese Colonial War

Production history
- Produced: 1938-1945
- No. built: ~650

Specifications
- Mass: Travel: 15,986 lb (7,251 kg); Action: 12,635 lb (5,731 kg)
- Barrel length: 15 ft 9 in (4.8 m); 42.8 calibres
- Crew: 10
- Shell: 114 x 695mmR 55 lb (25 kg) HE
- Calibre: 4.5 inch (114 mm)
- Breech: Welin breech and Asbury mechanism
- Elevation: 60-pdr carriage: 0 to +42° 5.5-inch gun carriage: -5° to +45°
- Traverse: 60-pdr carriage: 7° 5.5-inch gun carriage: 60° left to right
- Muzzle velocity: 2,250 ft/s (686 m/s)
- Maximum firing range: 20,500 yards (18,700 m)
- Sights: calibrating and reciprocating

The BL 4.5 inch medium gun was a British gun used by field artillery in the Second World War for counter-battery fire. Developed as a replacement for the BL 60-pounder gun it used the same carriage as the BL 5.5-inch medium gun but fired a lighter round further.

It had nothing in common with the QF 4.5 inch Howitzer or the QF 4.5 inch AA gun.

== Development ==
By the end of the 1930s, the First World War–era (5-inch calibre) BL 60-pounder gun Mk. I of 1905 and Mk. II of 1918 (two different designs) had become obsolete, and their barrels had mostly reached the end of their usable service life. A successor was sought and work began on an all-new design that would result in the Ordnance BL 4.5 inch medium field gun, a long-range medium gun designed for counter-battery fire. The gun was in use throughout the Second World War and it equipped a number of medium regiments, including half the Canadian ones. In service, the guns were fielded at the regiment level and were taken on by both British and Canadian artillery field groups during the war.

The 4.5 inch field gun could fire a 25 kg HE shell up to 11.6 miles with Charge 3. It matched German 10.5 cm and 150 mm howitzers in range and firepower.

For the sake of expediency, Mk I ordnance was designed to be mounted on the 1918 60-pounder carriage. The Mk I gun was first issued in 1938 and equipped one or two regiments of the British Expeditionary Force. The 4.5 inch Mk I due to lack of visual clues is sometimes mistaken for the 60-pounder.

The Mk II was on a new carriage that was also used with the BL 5.5 inch medium gun (which was being developed at the same time to replace the BL 6-inch 26 cwt howitzer). There were only slight differences between the Mk 1 and Mk 2 equipment and the maximum range was almost identical. Issues of the Mk 2 ordnance on the common carriage started in 1941.

== Production ==
Year	Pre-War	Sep−Dec 1939	1940	1941	1942	1943	1944	1945
60-pdr conversions	1	18	209	11	-	-	-	-
4.5" Guns	-	-	1	125	152	20	295	56

== Service ==
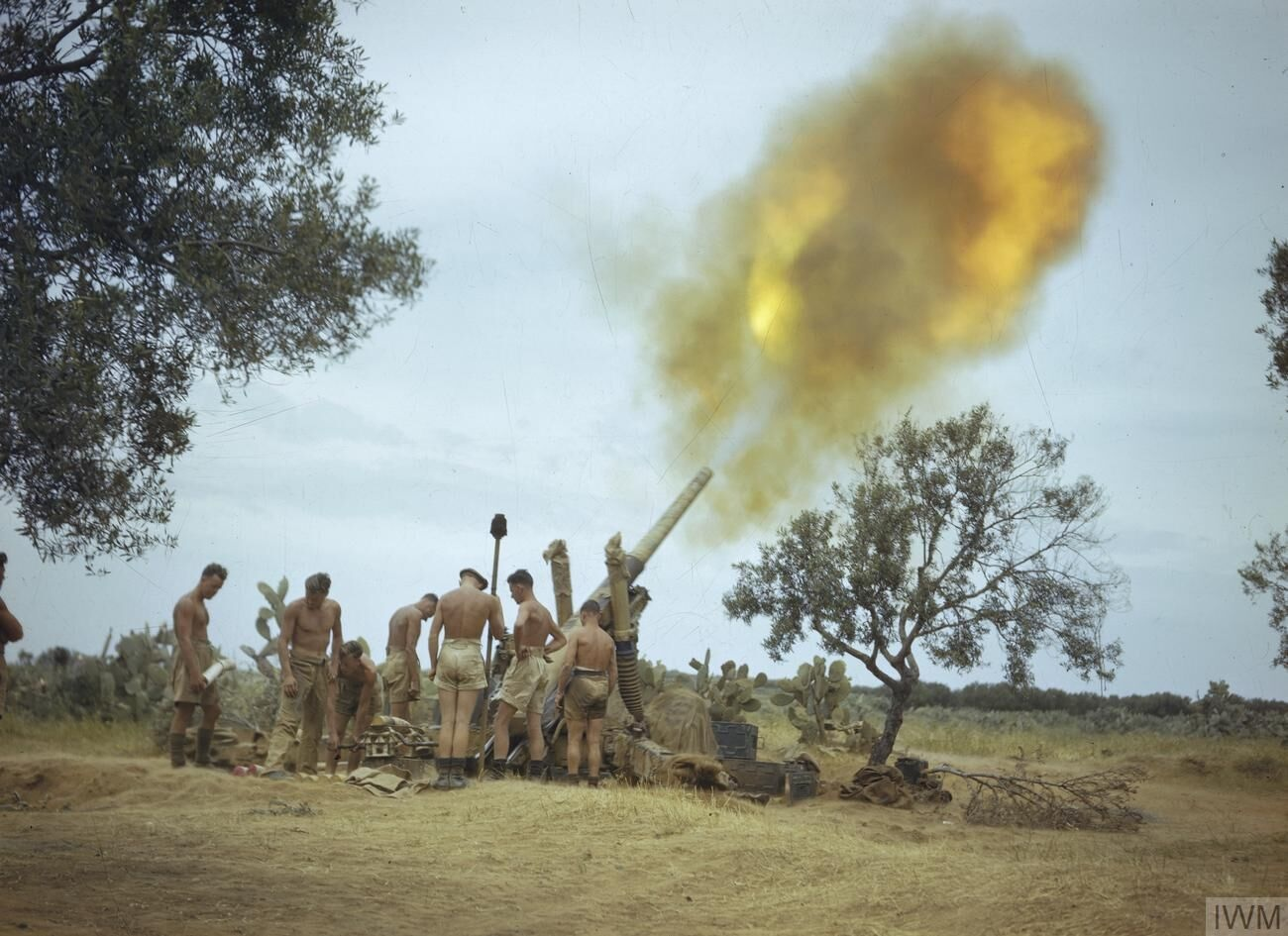
A British 4.5 inch gun firing in Tunisia, 1943

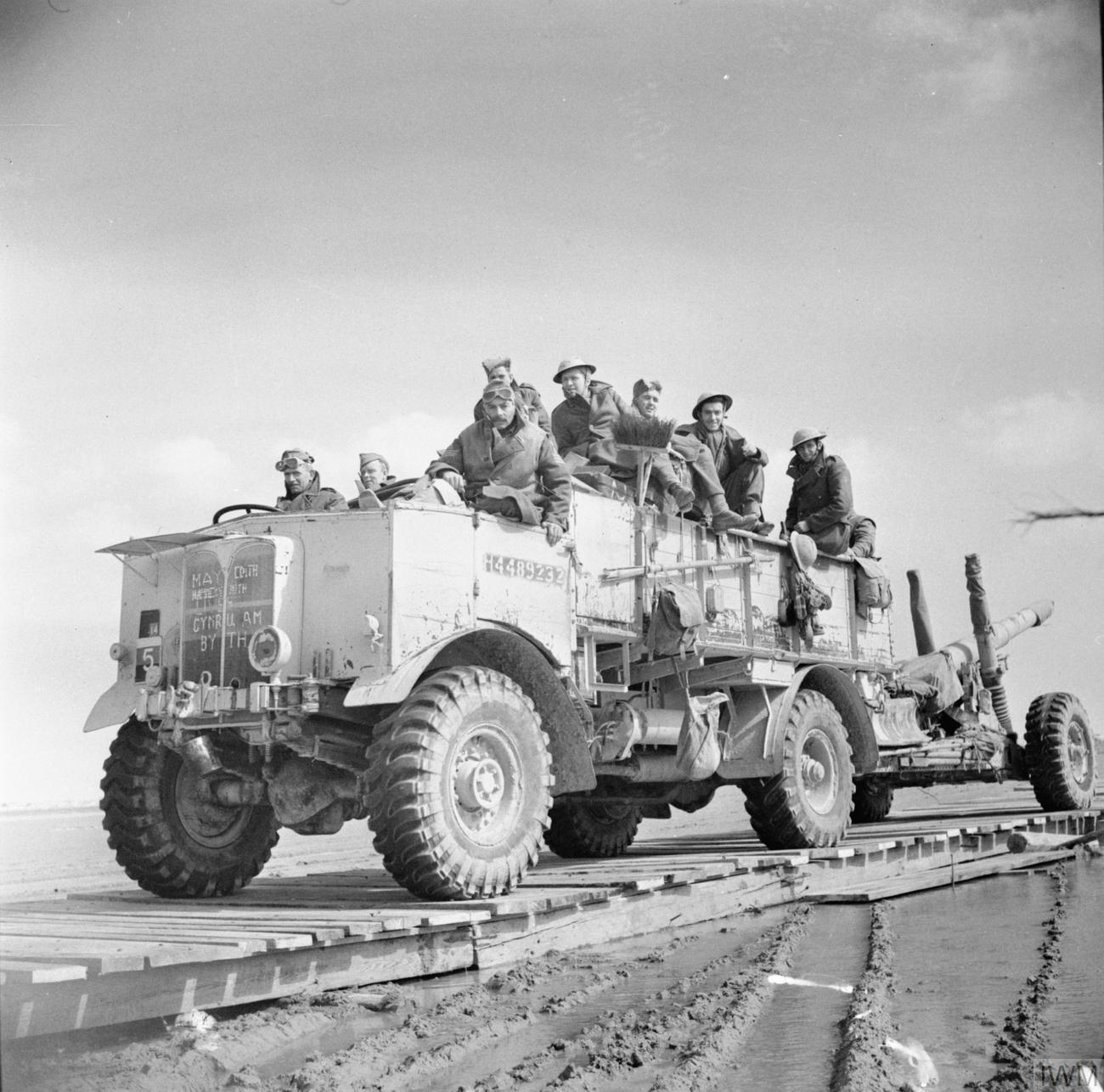
AEC Matador towing a 4.5-inch gun over wooden causeway in North Africa

The Mark I was used in the Battle of France in 1940. They also equipped at least one regiment in the North Africa campaign and some were lost during the Battle of Greece.

The Mk II gun served in North Africa, Italian campaign and North West Europe. It was withdrawn from field service in 1945, relegated to training purposes and finally declared obsolete in 1959 with the 5.5 inch gun replacing it. Both Mks were normally towed by the AEC Matador 4 × 4 medium artillery tractor. The Germans gave captured guns the designation 11.4 cm K 365(e).

The US 4.5 inch gun M1 used the same shell design, Mk 1D in UK service with a 6/10 crh. This design was noted for its small amount of HE (3.9 lb (1.8 kg) in a 55 lb (25 kg) shell) but the larger fragments that resulted were suited to its counter-battery role. Apart from HE, the only other type of shell was flare used to indicate targets for air attack. It had propellant in charges 1, 2 and 3. 'Intense' rate of fire was two rounds per minute, 'normal' rate was one round; 'gunfire' rate was two to three rounds per minute.

== Variants ==
Mark I

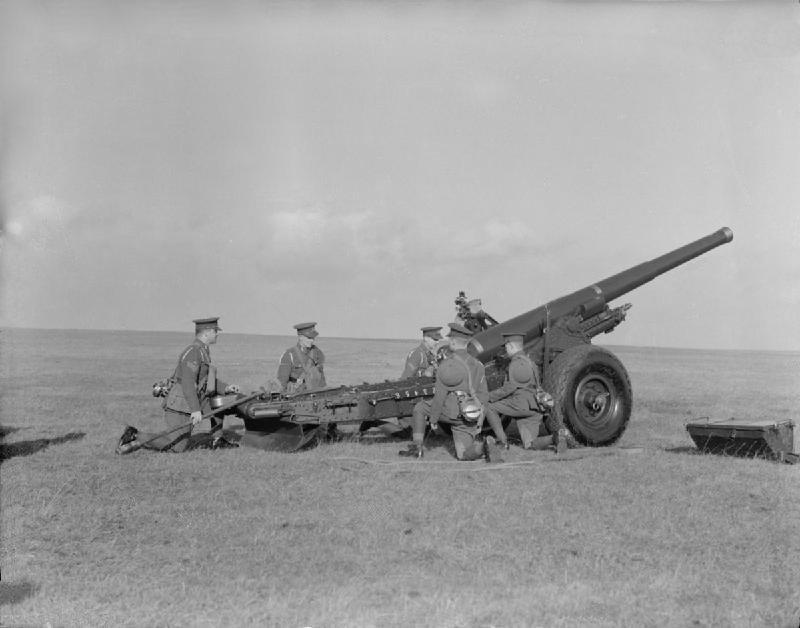
BL 60-pounder gun Mk II on Mk IV carriage, the same carriage as used in BL 4.5 inch Mk I

New 4.5 inch ordnance on 60 pounder carriage introduced in the 1930s used by the Royal Artillery in France and North Africa in the Second World War.
Mark II
Modified ordnance on carriage 4.5 inch and 5.5 inch in use in the Second World War from 1941 by British and Canadian artillery.

== See also ==
- 122 mm gun M1931/37 (A-19) approximate Soviet equivalent
- 10 cm sK 18 approximate German equivalent, smaller caliber
- 4.5-inch gun M1 United States equivalent, fired same ammunition
- BL 5.5-inch medium gun shared carriage
