= Dan Fredenburgh =

British actor and screenwriter

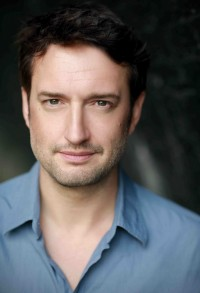
- Born: Daniel Rauff Fredenburgh; 1968 (age 57–58); Clapham, London, England
- Occupation: Actor

Daniel Rauff Fredenburgh (born 1968) is a British actor and screenwriter known for The Bourne Ultimatum (2007), Love Actually (2003) and the role of John Knightley in the BBC's adaptation of Emma (2009).

Since graduating from The Arts Educational School, he has worked in film, theatre and television for more than 20 years.

As a screenwriter, Fredenburgh has written a number of feature and TV projects. Notably, the film Broken Lines, starring Paul Bettany, Doraly Rosa and Olivia Williams, which was selected for the Venice Film Festival and London Film Festival and nominated for the FIPRESCI Critics’ Prize. He currently has a number of projects in development.

== Personal life ==
He was raised on a commune. Since the age of 10, Fredenburgh has lived in North London.

In 2002, he received an Ian Charleson Award commendation for his work in the title role of the Royal Shakespeare Company production of The Prince Of Homburg.

== Filmography ==
=== Television ===
| Year | Title | Role | Notes |
|---|---|---|---|
| 1994 | The Knock | Policeman | Episode: #1.1 |
| 2000 | Queen of Swords | Teodoro Selvera | Episode: "Running Wild" |
| 2001 | Sword of Honour | Radio Operator | Television film |
| 2001 | Bad Girls | Greg Hunt | Episode: "False Identity" |
| 2002 | Lexx | Gordon | 2 episodes |
| 2005 | Waking the Dead | Ben Elwes | 2 episodes |
| 2005–2006 | Donovan | Nick Pushko | 3 episodes |
| 2003–2007 | The Bill | Steve Fletcher Mark Turner | 3 episodes |
| 2008 | Ashes to Ashes | Simon Neary | Episode: #1.5 |
| 2009 | Emma | John Knightley | 4 episodes |
| 2013 | Father Brown | James Trewlove | Episode: "The Flying Stars" |
| 2013 | Spies of Warsaw | Armand | 3 episodes |
| 2003–2013 | Holby City | Daniel Hubbard Sean Horton | 2 episodes |
| 2013 | Love Matters | BB | Episode: "Officially Special" |
| 2013 | The Tunnel | Doctor Clacy | Episode: #1.3 |
| 2014 | The Evermoor Chronicles | Rob | 4 episodes |
| 2014 | The Missing | Greg Halpern | Episode: "Pray for Me" |
| 2015 | Sons of Liberty | Edward Rutledge | Episode: "Independence" |
| 2007–2016 | Silent Witness | Scott King Simon Kilvert | 4 episodes |
| 2007–2016 | Casualty | Various | 4 episodes |
| 2017 | Victoria | Chadwick | Episode: "Faith, Hope & Charity" |
| 2018 | The City and the City | Mikhel Buric | Episode: "Beszel" |
| 2018 | Press | Greg | Episode: "Don't Take My Heart, Don't Break My Heart" |
| 2019 | A Confession | Mark Ley-Morgan | Episode: "Episode 5" |
| 2019 | A Christmas Carol | Mr. Hooper | Episode: "Chapter One: The Human Beast" |
| 2002–2020 | Doctors | Graham Jason Farnham | 2 episodes |
| 2022 | This England | Doctor Nick | Episode: #1.5 |
| 2023 | Fifteen-Love | Rich Berrigan | Episode: #1.5 |

=== Film ===
| Year | Title | Role | Notes |
|---|---|---|---|
| 1999 | Café D'Paris | Mickey | Short film |
| 2000 | Brothers | Julian Davidson "The King" | |
| 2002 | Al's Lads | Frankie | |
| 2003 | Love Actually | Jamie's Bad Brother | |
| 2006 | Land of the Blind | Rep. Johnny Boy Barth | |
| 2007 | Earthquake | Joe | Short film |
| 2007 | The Bourne Ultimatum | Jimmy | |
| 2008 | Unborn | George | Short film |
| 2008 | Broken Lines | Jake | |
| 2009 | Maybe One Day | Dan | Short film |
| 2009 | Infidel | Miles | Short film |
| 2014 | Night Armour | Tony | Short film |
| 2015 | Kicking Off | Prof Jennings | |
| 2017 | Rise of the Footsoldier 3: The Pat Tate Story | Joss | |
| 2019 | A Boy, a Man and a Kite | Daniel | Short film |
| 2019 | Kurier | Major SOE | |
| 2019 | Adults in the Room | Osborne | |
| 2019 | Best Mom Ever | | Short film |
| 2019 | The Courier | Frank | |
| 2021 | A Christmas Number One | Josh | Uncredited |

== Radio ==
- Tender Is The Night – BBC Radio 4
