= BL 60-pounder gun =

Ordnance BL 60 Pounder
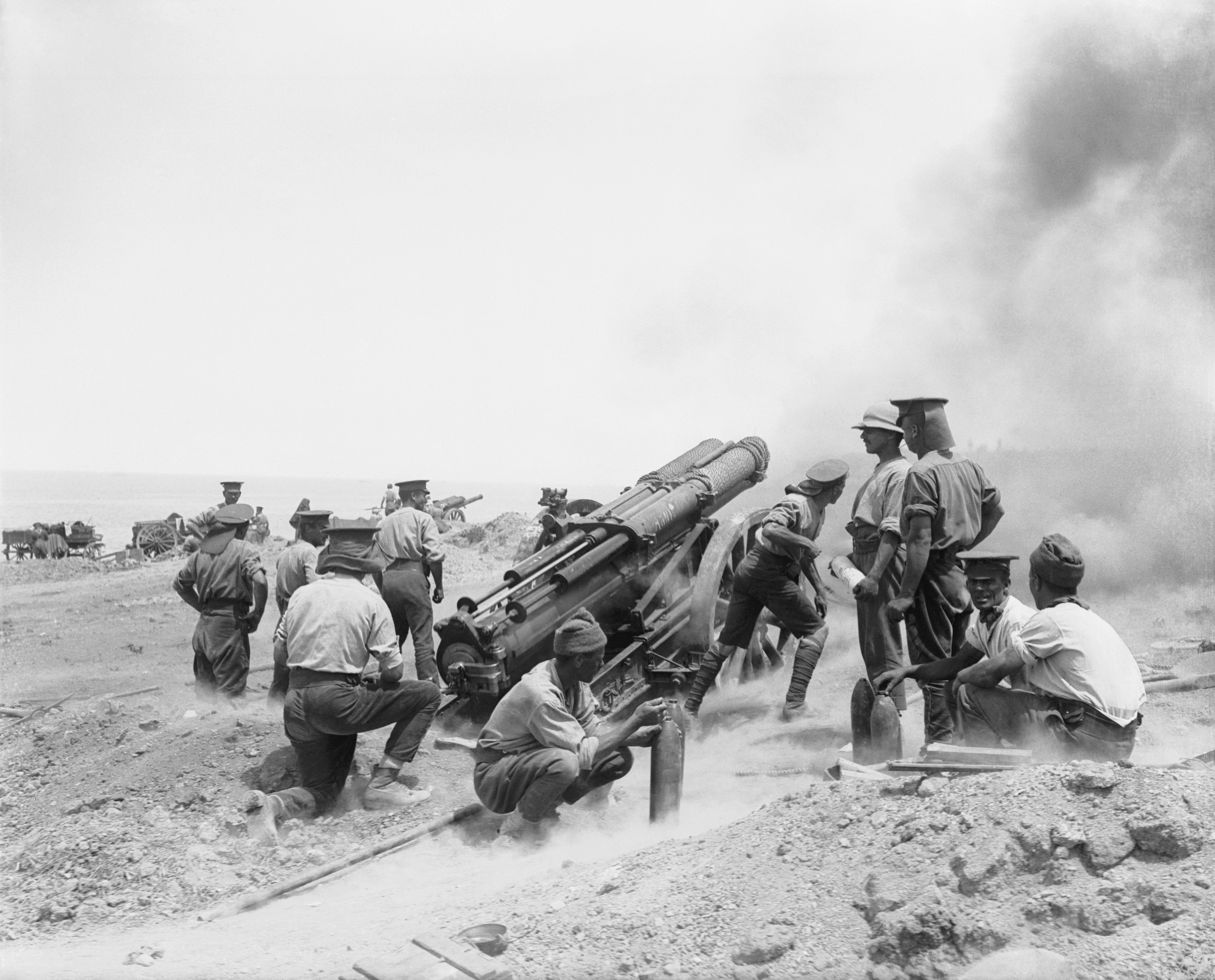
- A 60-pounder Mk I at full recoil. Photographed by Ernest Brooks in action at Cape Helles during the Battle of Gallipoli, June 1915.
- Type: Heavy field gun
- Place of origin: United Kingdom

Service history
- In service: 1905–1944
- Used by: British Empire; British Commonwealth; United States; Russian Empire; Soviet Union
- Wars: First World War; Second World War

Production history
- Designer: Elswick Ordnance
- Designed: 1904
- No. built: 1,756 (Mk. I)

Specifications (Mk I gun on Mk I carriage)
- Mass: 4 ton 11 cwt 3 qtr 7 lb (4.664 t)
- Length: 21 ft 7 in (6.6 m)
- Barrel length: 14 ft (4.3 m) total 13 ft 4 in (4.1 m) bore (L/32)
- Width: 6 ft 6 1/2 in (2.0 m)
- Height: 5 ft 8 in (1.7 m) without sights
- Crew: 10
- Shell weight: 60 lb (27 kg)
- Calibre: 5 in (130 mm)
- Elevation: 21½° max elevation 5° max depression
- Muzzle velocity: 2,080 ft/s (630 m/s)
- Maximum firing range: 10,300 yd (9,400 m) early 12,300 yd (11,200 m) later
- References: Handbook for 60 pdr Mk I & Allied Artillery of World War One

BL 60-pounder gun

Specifications (Mk II gun on Mk IV carriage)
- Mass: 5 ton 10 cwt 14 lb (5.594 t)
- Length: 24 ft 10 1/2 in (7.6 m)
- Barrel length: 16 ft 1/4 in (4.9 m) total 15 ft 5 in (4.7 m) bore (L/37)
- Width: 8 ft (2.4 m)
- Height: 5 ft 5 in (1.65 m)
- Crew: 10
- Shell weight: 60 lb (27 kg)
- Calibre: 5 in (127 mm)
- Recoil: 4 ft 6 in (1.37 m) horizontal 2 ft (0.61 m) max elevation
- Elevation: 35° max elevation 5° max depression
- Traverse: 4° left and right
- Muzzle velocity: 2,145 ft/s (654 m/s)
- Maximum firing range: 15,700 yd (14,400 m)
- References: Handbook for 60 pdr Mks II & II* on Mk IV carriage & Allied Artillery of World War One

The Ordnance BL 60-pounder (Note: At the time the gun was developed it was traditional British practice to designate field guns according to approximate weight of their standard projectile.) was a British 5-inch (127 mm) heavy field gun designed in 1903–05 to provide a new capability that had been partially met by the interim QF 4.7 inch gun. It was designed for both horse draft and mechanical traction and served throughout the First World War in the main theatres. It remained in service with British and Commonwealth forces in the inter-war period and in frontline service with British and South African batteries until 1942 being superseded by the BL 4.5-inch medium gun.

== History ==
=== Origin and use ===
The effective use of modern heavy field guns by the Boers during the Second Boer War (1899–1902) was a revelation to armies in Europe including the British. They were impressed by their mobility and range. Britain used some heavy guns in that war under ad hoc arrangements. After the capture of Pretoria in 1900 Lord Roberts, the commander-in-chief in South Africa (and an artillery officer), had stated the requirements of a heavy field gun: a range of 10,000 yards, weight behind the team of no more than 4 tons, and the largest possible shell. The Ordnance Committee in London then ordered experimental guns, and three were trialled.

In 1902 the Heavy Battery Committee was formed comprising officers experienced with heavy and siege artillery in South Africa and presided over by Colonel Perrott who had commanded the Siege Train there. In early 1903 their first report dismissed the 4.7-inch (120 mm, used in South Africa) and the 30 pounder (used in India) from further consideration because they lacked firepower. Of the three trial guns they accepted the Armstrong design but rejected all three carriage designs. New designs were sought that were easier for detachments to use. 1904 trials with a new design, including both horse and mechanised towing, resulted in further changes but in 1905 the design for the BL 60 pounder was accepted, although it was still a half ton over the target weight.

In 1900 the Secretary of State for War had announced a plan to give "Volunteer Position Batteries 4.7 inch guns", he also extolled the merits of 4.7, (which the army knew to be misleading) and in 1902 and 1903 Parliament voted to equip 60 Volunteer batteries with a 4.7-inch, despite the 60 pounder being in development. The 4.7-inch had many weaknesses as a field equipment, but it had captured the public's imagination. However, in 1903 a heavy brigade RGA was formed by converting three siege companies and equipping them with 4.7-inch guns. The following year a second brigade was formed from three more RGA companies. These regular army brigades were part of the corps artillery, although their equipment was an expedient.

The 60 pounder gun was used on most fronts during the First World War and replaced the 4.7-inch guns. At the outbreak of war they equipped, with 4 guns, the heavy battery RGA in each infantry division. In 1916 all batteries on the Western Front started being increased to 6 guns. By this time heavy batteries had ceased to be part of each infantry division and batteries became part of what were eventually called Heavy Artillery Groups with several batteries of different types. After the First World War they equipped medium brigades, later regiments.

=== Production ===
By the outbreak of war in 1914 41 guns had been produced, 13 being in Canada and India. Armstrong were the main supplier, with Vickers and the Ordnance Factory Woolwich also producing complete equipments. Major assemblies including barrels were also produced by many other companies. Total wartime production was 1,773 guns (i.e. barrels) and 1,397 carriages.

== Description ==
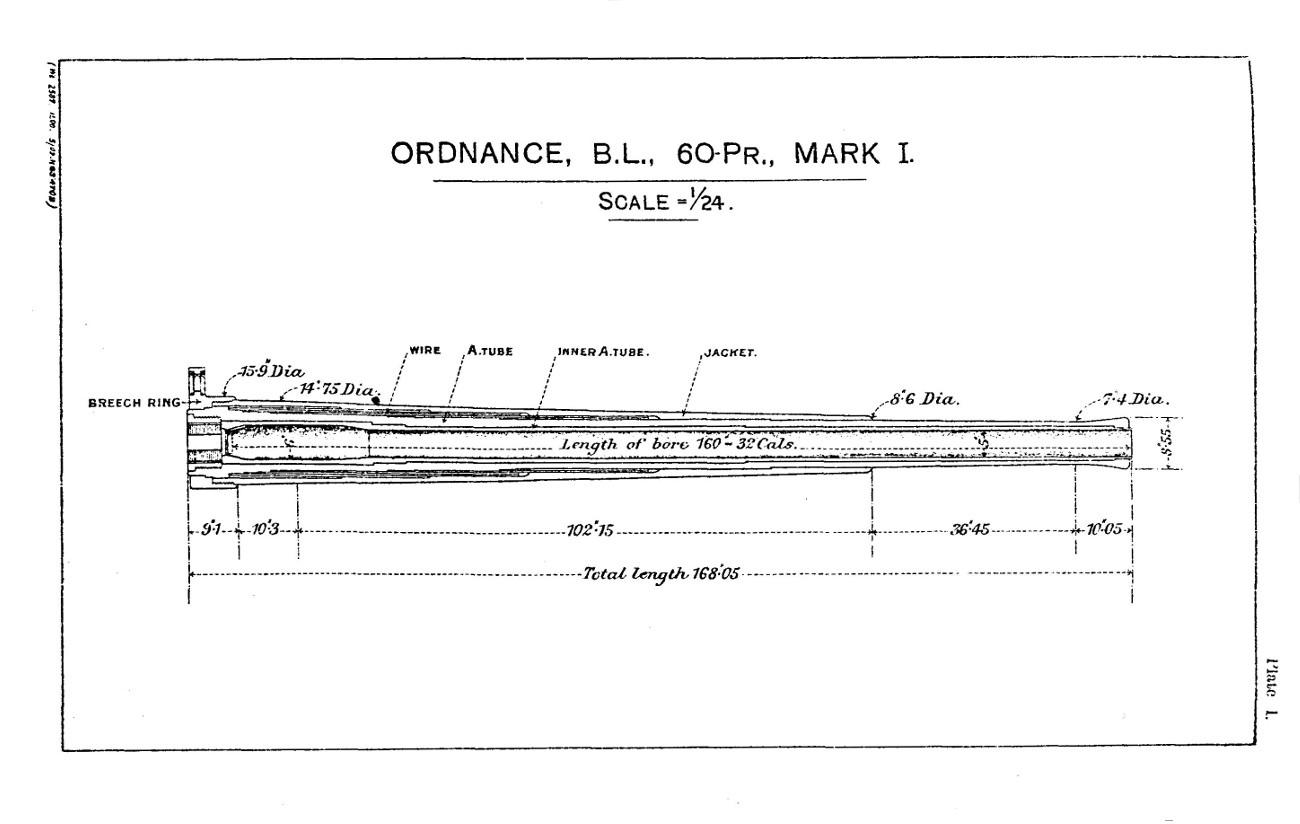
Mk I barrel design

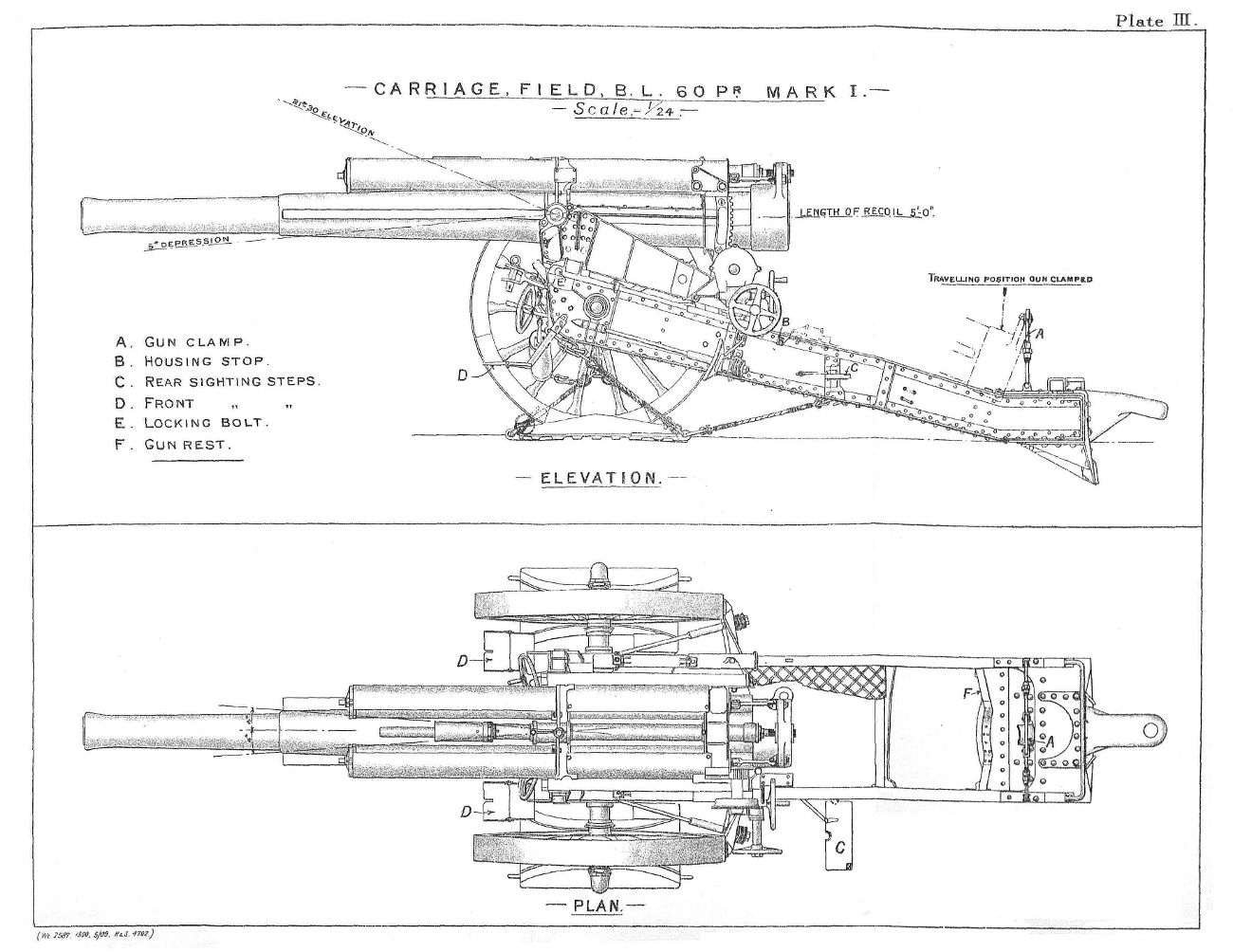
Drawing of the Mk. I carriage

=== General features ===
The 60-pounder was a heavy field gun or "gun of position" designed to be towed by either a horse team or mechanical vehicle. It had a quick firing recoil, meaning that the carriage did not move when the gun fired. The barrel was a wire wound tube in a jacket with a screw breech. It fired a separate round (i.e. shell and bagged cartridge were loaded separately). The lower carriage comprised a box trail. It was designed for one-man laying with both traverse and elevation sights and controls on the left.

The Mark I gun's recoil system was in two tubes above the barrel and used a hydraulic buffer with a hydro-spring recuperator to return the barrel to its firing position. The Mark II gun had a hydro-pneumatic system below the barrel.

Initially the 60 pounder was fitted with tangent sights on a rocking bar with the range scale graduated to 10,400 yards and 22 degrees, the rear sight had a deflection scale. Before the First World War it was fitted with oscillating (reciprocating) sights, using the older No 5 sighting telescope (x12 magnification) on either Sight Oscillating BL 60 pr Mk I or II, which included a sight clinometer and range scale as well as a deflection drum for the telescope. This was replaced by the No 3 carrier for the No 7 dial sight.

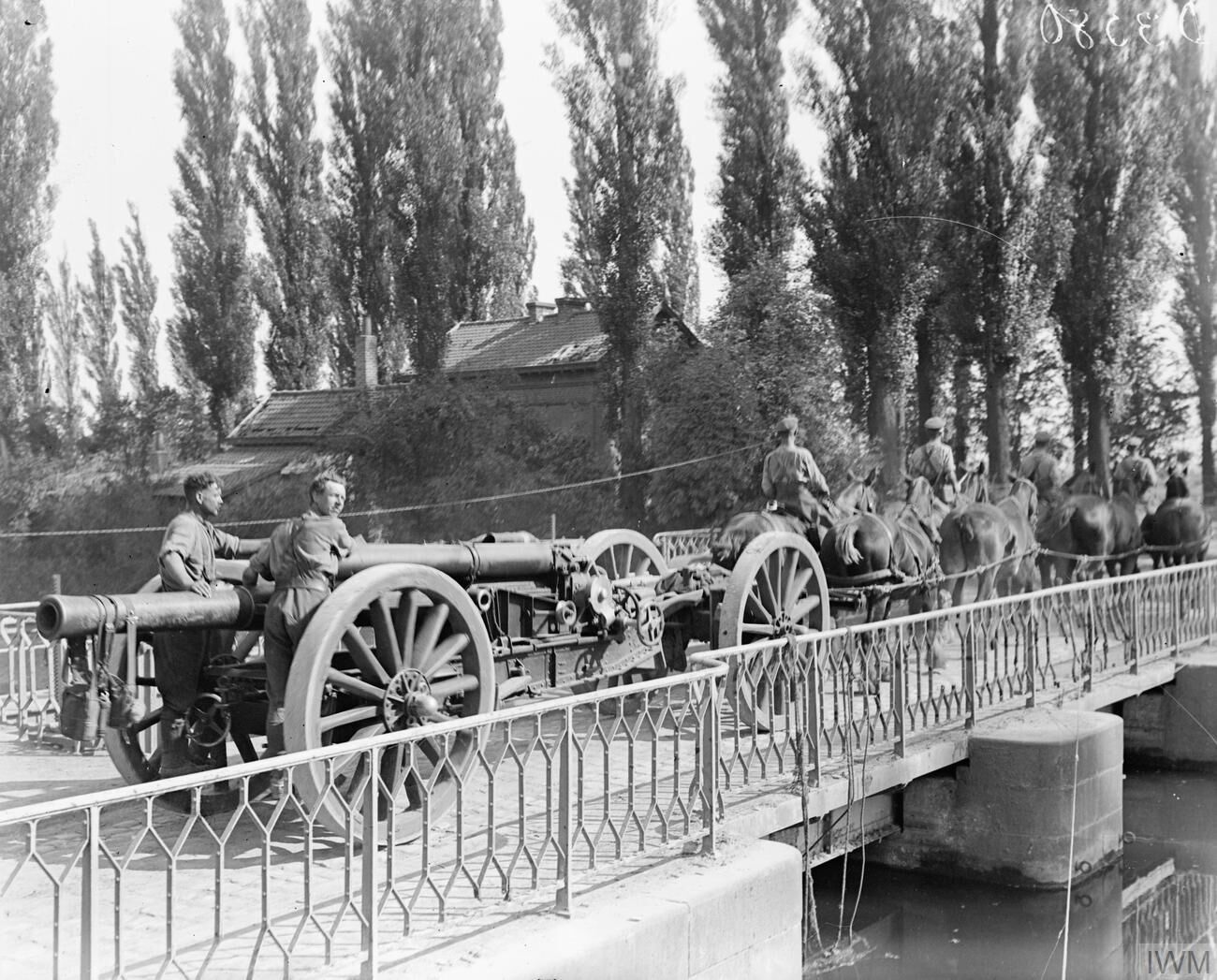
Gun on Mk I carriage being towed in Flanders, August 1918

=== Mk I gun on Mk I carriage ===
The original 1904 gun and carriage was designed for the gun barrel and recoil mechanism to be moved rearwards on its carriage (i.e. the breech moved towards the end of the trail) when traveling. This was intended to equalise the weight born by the 2 gun carriage wheels and the 2 wheels of the limber towing the gun, hence minimising the weight born by any single wheel. Its cradle was difficult to make. Mk I carriage had the usual field artillery wooden spoked wheels with iron tyres.

In February 1915, wartime manufacturing and maintenance requirements led to a simplification of the barrel construction, as gun Mk I* and Mk I**.

=== Mk I gun on Mk II carriage ===
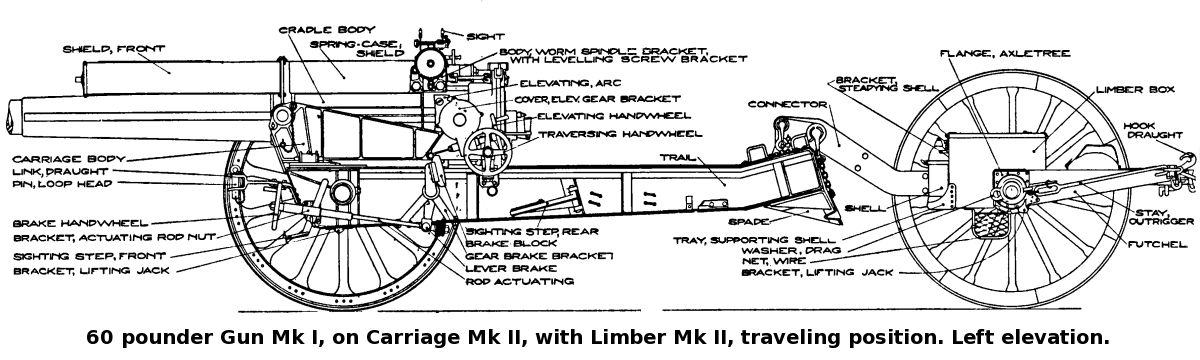
Mk I Gun on Mk II carriage, traveling position

Wartime manufacturing of the carriage was simplified in Mk II by removing the provision to retract the gun for traveling. This moved most of the weight when traveling away from the limber on to the carriage's own wheels – most weight was on the gun carriage wheels rather than the limber wheels and it was 1 ton heavier. 5 ft (1.5 m) diameter x 1 ft (0.30 m) wide steel traction engine wheels replaced the wooden wheels to cope with the added weight. The tractor wheels added more weight to be towed, requiring the use of Holt 75 artillery tractors to replace horses. In early 1917 new brakes, a new cradle design and calibrating sights were adopted.

=== Mk I gun on Mk III carriage ===
The increased weight with the traction engine wheels made maneuvering difficult in typical mud conditions. In June 1916 the BEF commander General Haig requested a return to the lighter Mk I carriage. This was not possible, but retracting the gun back on its carriage for traveling was re-introduced in simplified form by disconnecting the barrel from the recoil system and locking it on the trail in the recoiled position. This reduced the weight by 9 long hundredweight (457 kg). Wooden spoked wheels were re-introduced. This became the Mk III carriage, or Mk II* for converted Mk II carriages.

=== Mk II gun on Mk IV carriage ===
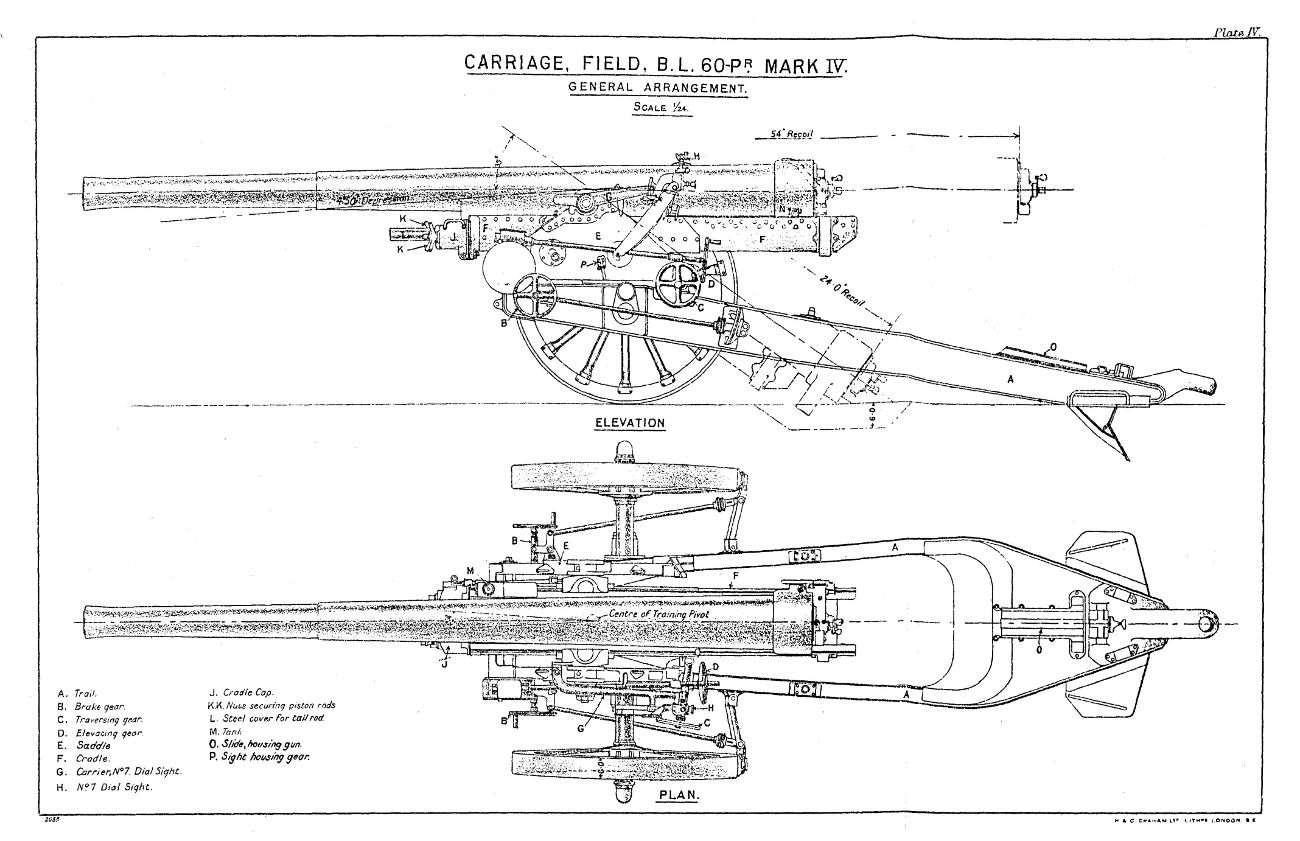
Drawing of the Mk. II gun on Mk. IV carriage

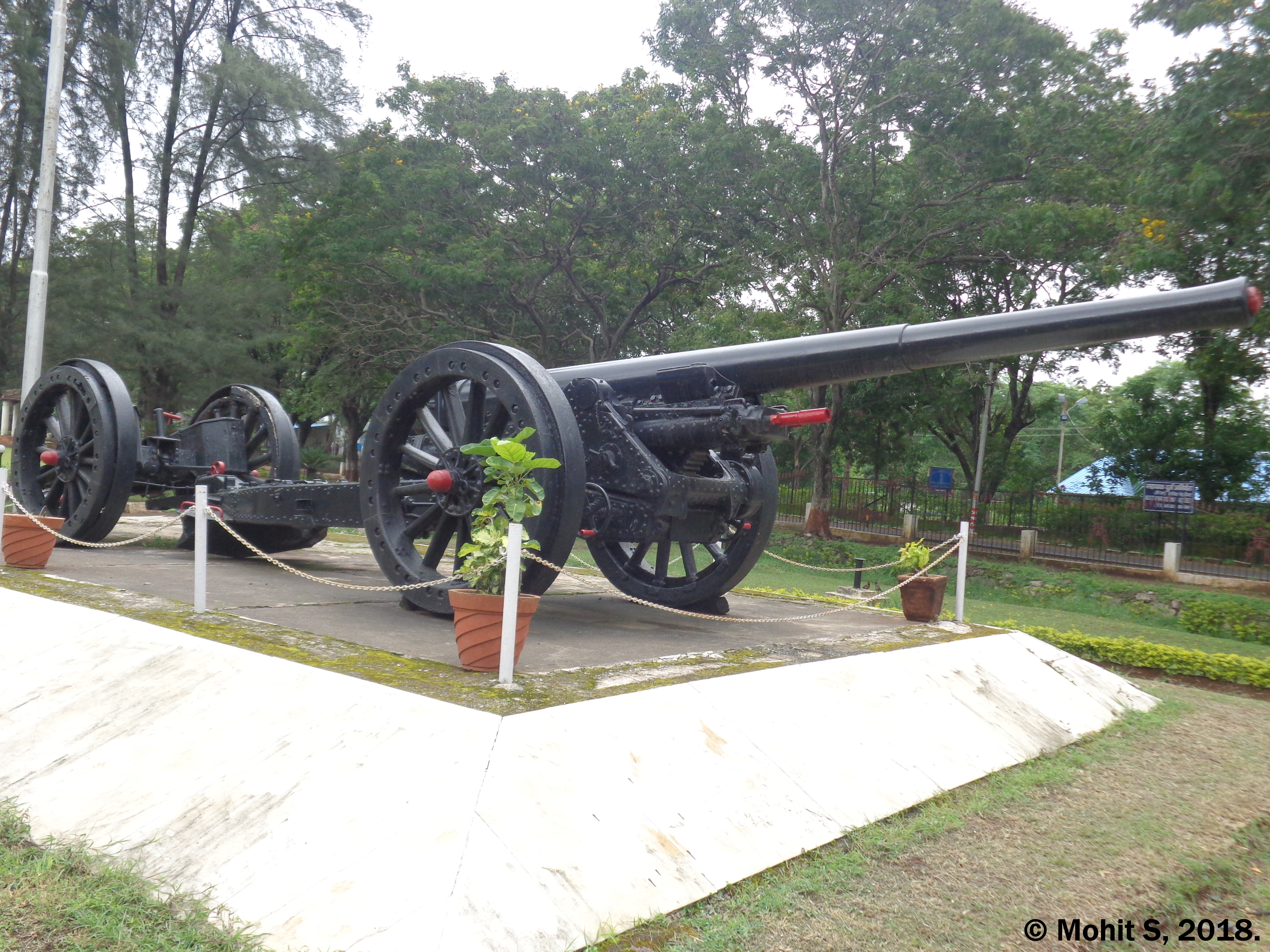
A gun on Mk IVR carriage as a monument in India

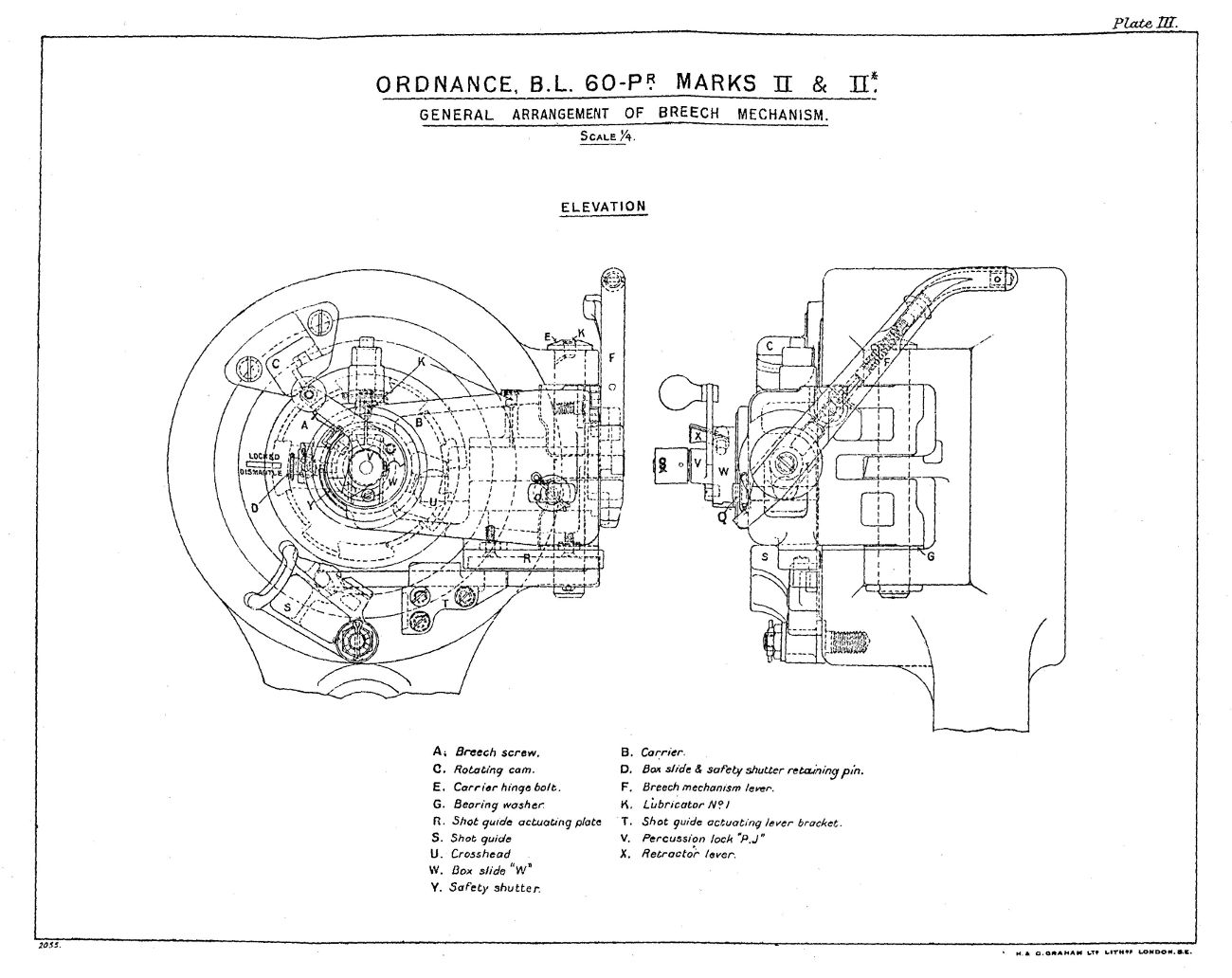
Mk II breech mechanism

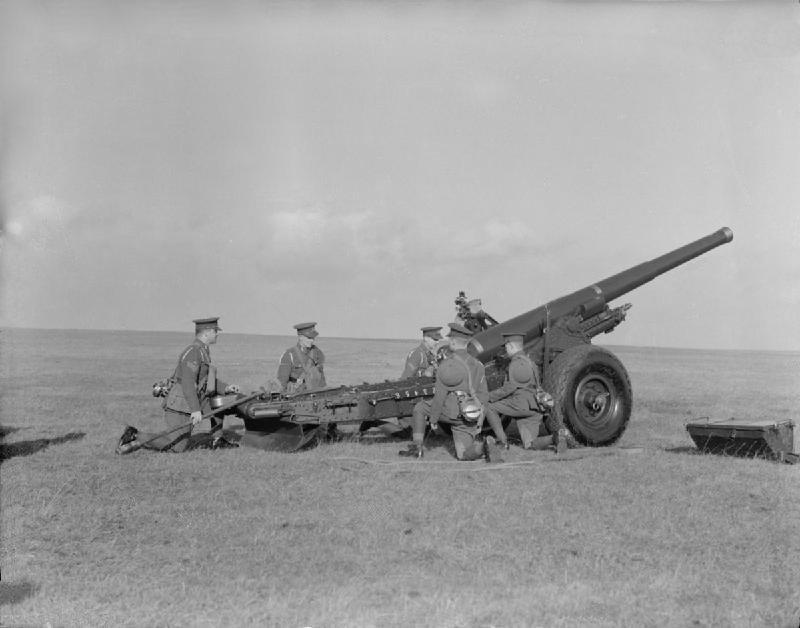
A gun on pneumatic tyres (Mk IVP carriage), ca. 1938

The Mk II gun introduced from 1918 had a longer barrel, new box trail carriage giving increased elevation to 35 degrees and cut-off gear to automatically reduce the recoil length from 54 to 24-inches with increasing elevation, hydro-pneumatic recoil system below the barrel, single-motion Asbury breech. It arrived too late to see service in the First World War and was effectively a new weapon. The gun was one of two types that could be carried by the tracked Gun Carrier Mark I.

=== Between the wars ===
After the First World War the various types of heavy artillery (including siege) were redesignated medium, heavy and super-heavy and these terms used to describe both the guns and in battery and brigade designations. The 60 pounder was officially classed as medium. These terms had been used in various documents in that war but not in the official designations of batteries.

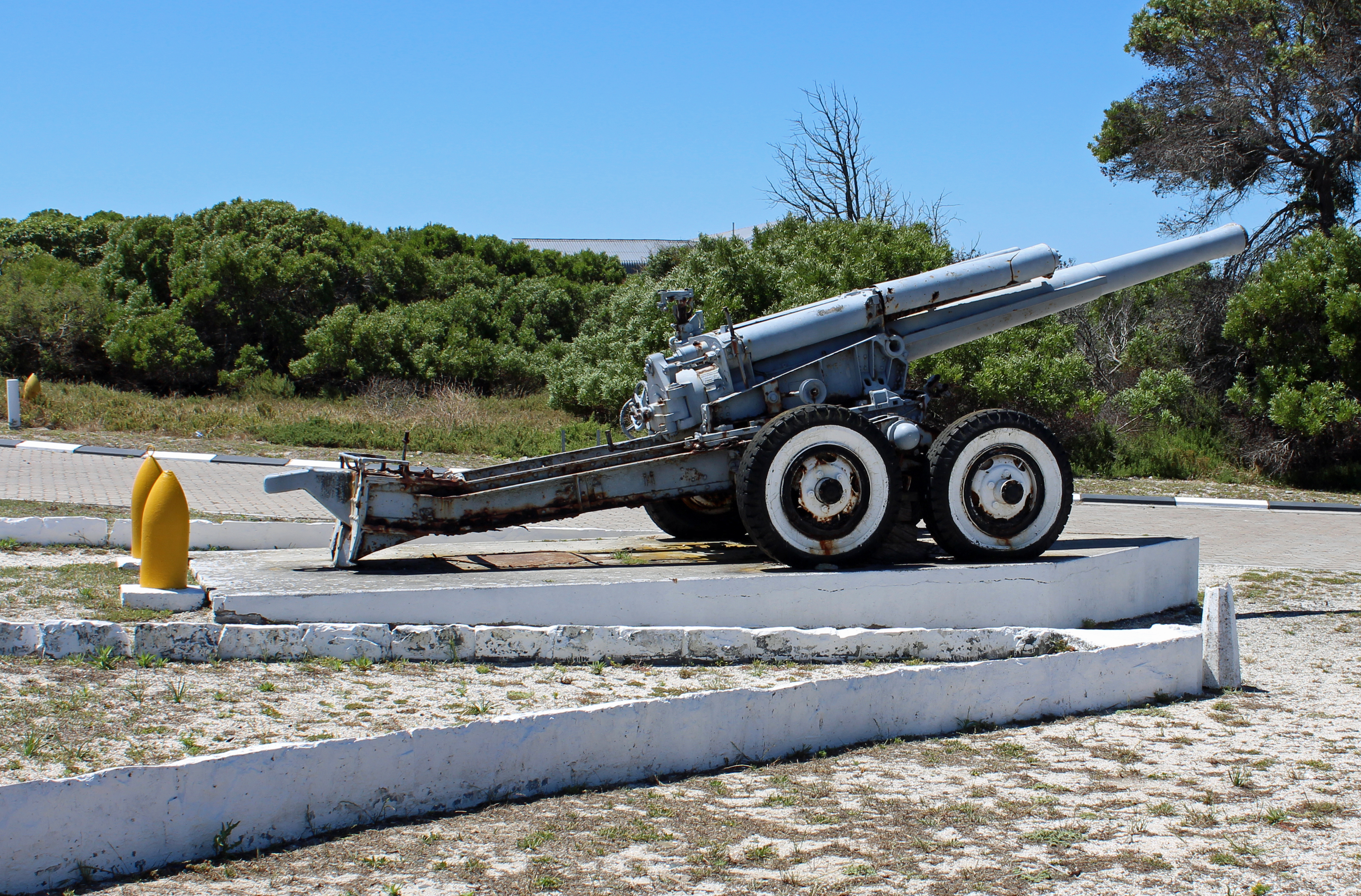
South African modernisation of the 60-pounder Mk. I on the Robben Island

The 60 pounder remained unchanged except for carriage modifications, to enable mechanisation, and new sights. The Mk IVR carriage had wooden wheels and solid rubber tyres. The later Mk IVP carriage had metal wheels, pneumatic tyres and appropriate brakes. South Africa developed a new carriage of their own design from the Mk. I, which replaced wooden wheels with pneumatic tyred ones on a two-wheel bogie.

Sights were changed to the calibrating type, initially to the No 9 Carrier for the No 7 Dial Sight. This carrier had a muzzle velocity corrector scale and an elevating arc below the sight mount; the arc was fitted with a choice of range scales depending on the ammunition being used. Subsequently, the No 14 carrier was issued, this was a Probert pattern calibrating sight, the range scale plate being double sided, 8 CRH shell full charge (13,700 yards) and reduced charge Mk IXC (8,300 yards) on one side. On the other side for the 56 lb shell (15,200 yards).

In the 1930s some carriages were converted to the new 4.5 inch (114 mm) BL ordnance to become "BL 4.5-inch gun Mk 1 on Carriage 60 pr Mark IV and IVP", which then started replacing the 60-pounder.

=== Second World War ===
The 60-pounder was withdrawn from active service in 1941 but remained in training use until 1944. It was replaced by the BL 4.5-inch and BL 5.5-inch medium guns.

== Combat use ==
=== First World War ===
The 60-pounder Mk. I were formed into "Heavy Batteries" in the First World War operated by the Royal Garrison Artillery and used mainly for counter-battery fire (i.e. suppressing or destroying the enemy's artillery). When the First World War began a single 4-gun battery was attached to each infantry division of the BEF as available – initial numbers restricted it to the Regular divisions 1 – 6, others were equipped with the obsolescent QF 4.7-inch gun. From early 1915, 60 pounder batteries moved from Division to Army control. As more 60 pounders became available the 4.7-inch guns were retired.

Writers such as General Farndale occasionally refer to 60 pounders as "medium" guns, but in the First World War they were officially referred to as heavy guns.

From 30 June 1916 the War Office adopted Major-General Noel Birch's recommendations to increase heavy battery sizes to 6 guns, as more guns with better concentration of firepower were required on the Western Front, while minimising the administrative overhead of more batteries. Batteries in the other minor theatres appear to have mostly retained a four-gun structure.

In the First World War the Mk I gun could fire the early 60 lb (27.3 kg) 2 c.r.h. shell 10,300 yd (9.4 km), and the later more streamlined 8 c.r.h. shell to 12,300 yards (11,200 m). Weighing 4.4 tonnes, the 60-pounder required a team of 8 horses to tow it, with a maximum of 12 possible in difficult conditions. Mechanical towing by Holt 75 tractors and later motor lorries took over from horses towards the end of the First World War.

At the end of the war no batteries were based within the United Kingdom, 74 batteries were in service with the BEF on the Western Front, three in Italy, 11 in Macedonia, seven in Palestine, and four in Mesopotamia. In addition 2 Canadian batteries were active on the Western Front and were the only other force using the weapon. 456 guns served on the Western Front, and over 110 served on all other location outside the British Isles.

=== Post–First World War ===
60 pounder remained in service during the inter-war period and was used in Russia (1919) and Mesopotamia 1920–21.

During the Second World War they served with the BEF in France and North Africa in medium regiments, by the South African artillery in East Africa and by an Australian battery (1/12th Regiment, Royal Australian Artillery) at Tobruk. Its last combat action was in the Western Desert. Nineteen were with the BEF and lost in France and total British holdings were expected to be 134 guns by August 1940, most being reconditioned or repaired guns.

== US service ==
Shortly after the Armistice, Britain offered the United States 200 60-pounders to resolve outstanding contractual obligations (primarily in lieu of additional 9.2-inch howitzers) and the offer was accepted. The weapons were primarily Mark I guns produced by the Elswick Ordnance Company. Their acquisition was reported in the US Army Ordnance Department's May 1920 Handbook of Artillery:

"The United States procured a number of batteries of 5-inch 60 pounder guns with the necessary accompanying vehicles from Great Britain. The materiel is of British design and manufacture throughout, and the units ceded to the United States include the Gun, Mark I, mounted on a carriage, Mark II; the gun carriage limber, Mark II, the ammunition wagon, Mark II; and the ammunition wagon limber, Mark II".

The accompanying photograph in the manual depicts a Mk I gun on Mk II carriage with traction-engine wheels typical of the Mk II carriage, and the accompanying diagram depicts the gun in the forward traveling position (i.e. with weight over the gun carriage) typical of the Mk II carriage mounting. The carriages had poles and other fittings for horse draft, but these could be replaced with a connector for tractor draft.

A few weapons delivered to the US before the Armistice for evaluation had the Mark I carriage, but most had the Mark II carriage. 200 weapons were delivered in January 1919, and 67,000 rounds of ammunition by the end of June 1919. Most of the weapons remained unused by June 1931, when the Secretary of War suggested they be disposed of through donation as war memorials. 197 guns were available for this. Despite many going to scrap drives in World War II, over thirty weapons remained on display in the US in the 2010s.

== Ammunition ==
At the beginning of the First World War 60 pounder ammunition scale was 70% shrapnel and 30% HE. The standard shell was 2 CRH, but in 1917 an 8 CRH shell was adopted.

Subsequently, after the First World War a 56-pound 10 CRH shell to 15,200 yards was introduced. However, its HE content was less than 2/3 that of the various 60 lb shells and it was some 3-inches shorter.

Shrapnel was also varied with bullet weights ranging from 35 to 41 bullets/pound and total loads varying from 616 (Mk ID) to 992 (Mk I) bullets.

Chemical shells were used with 60 pounder but not smoke or incendiary.

=== First World War ammunition ===
Cordite cartridge	Mk III common lyddite shell	No 17 D.A. percussion fuze for lyddite shell	Mk V HE shell	No. 101 fuze for HE shell	Mk I shrapnel shell	No. 83 fuze for shrapnel shell	Mk VII V.S. percussion tube

== Image gallery ==
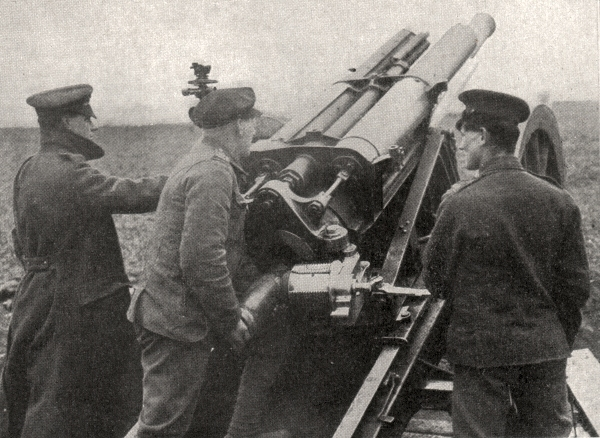
Loading a 60 pdr gun

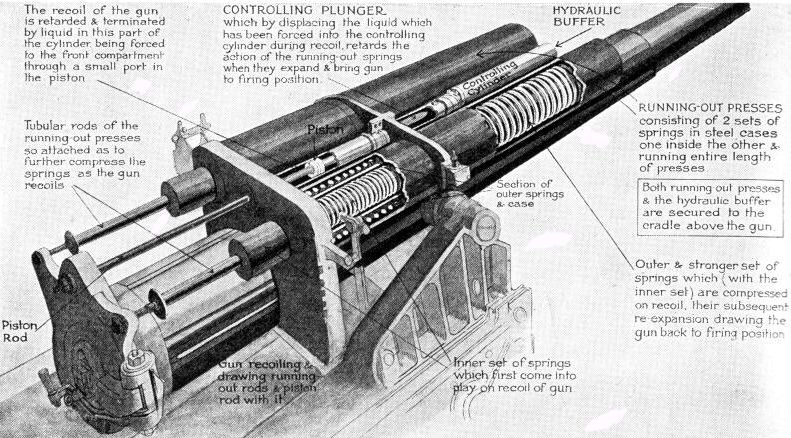
60 pounder gun Mk. I recoil mechanism, 1916

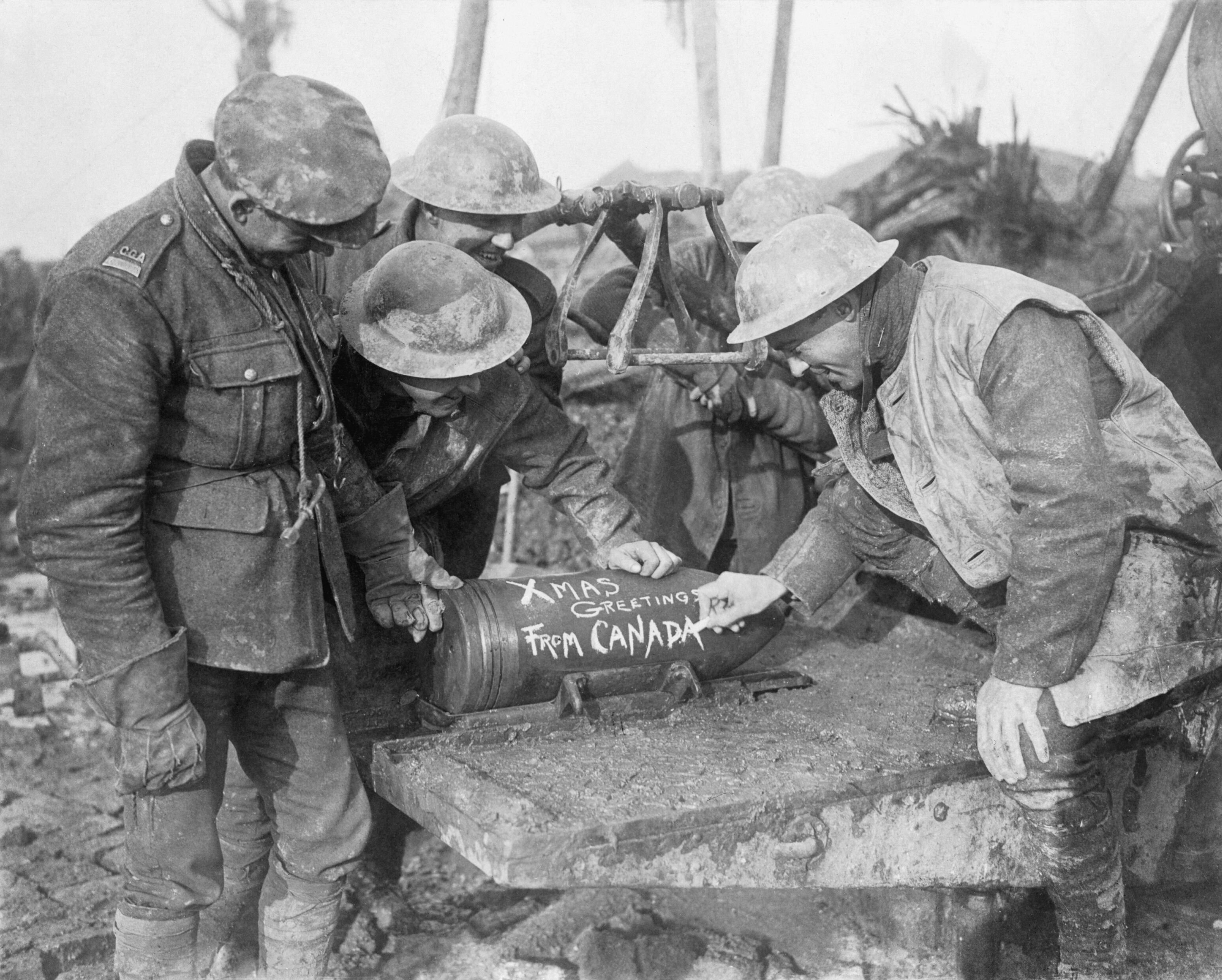
Canadian artillerymen with Xmas message on 60 pdr shell, Somme, November 1916

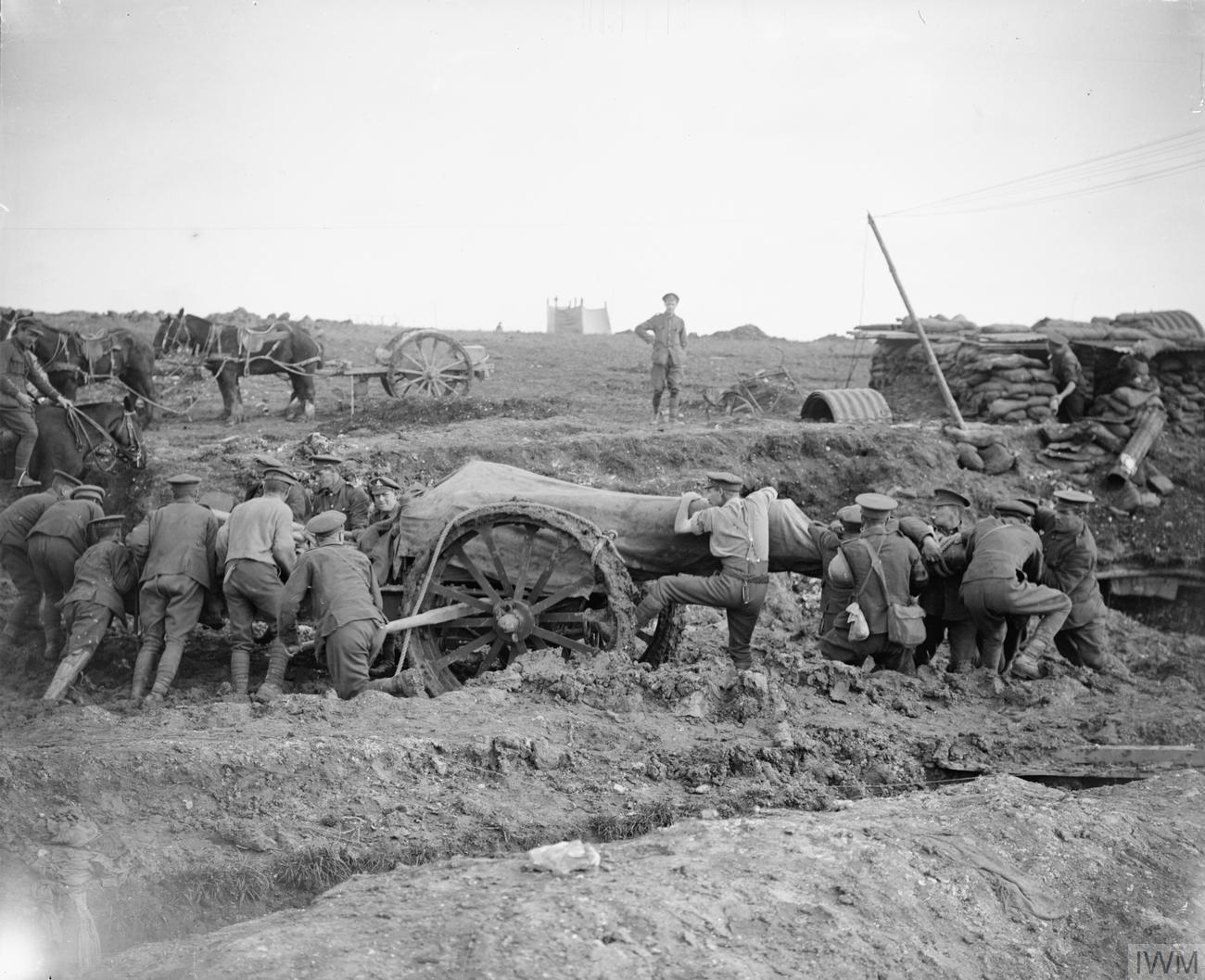
On Mk II carriage with tractor wheels, in the mud at Bazentin-le-Petit October 1916

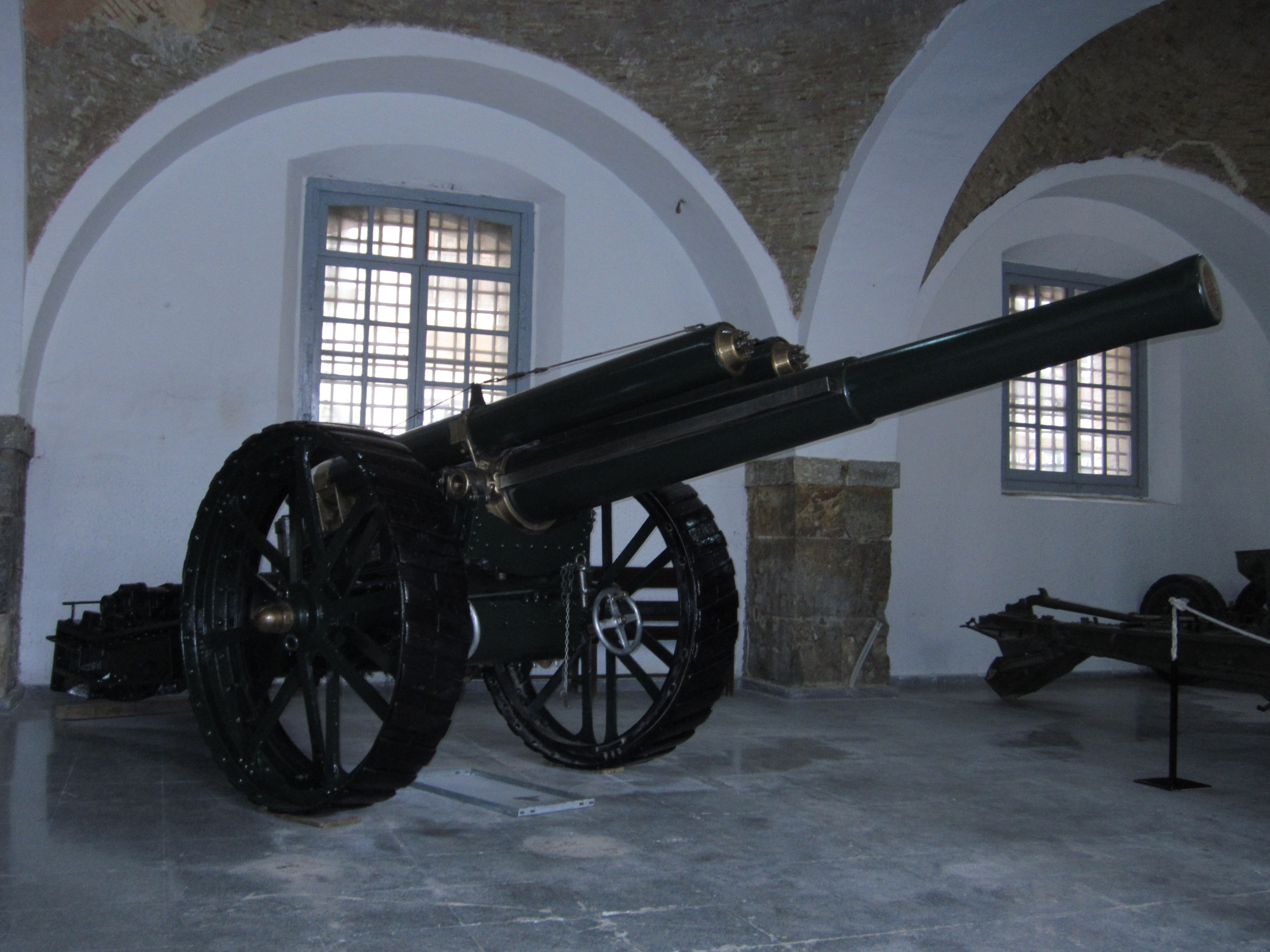
BL-60 pounder Mk I in Historical Military Museum of Cartagena (Spain)

== Surviving examples ==
=== In museums ===
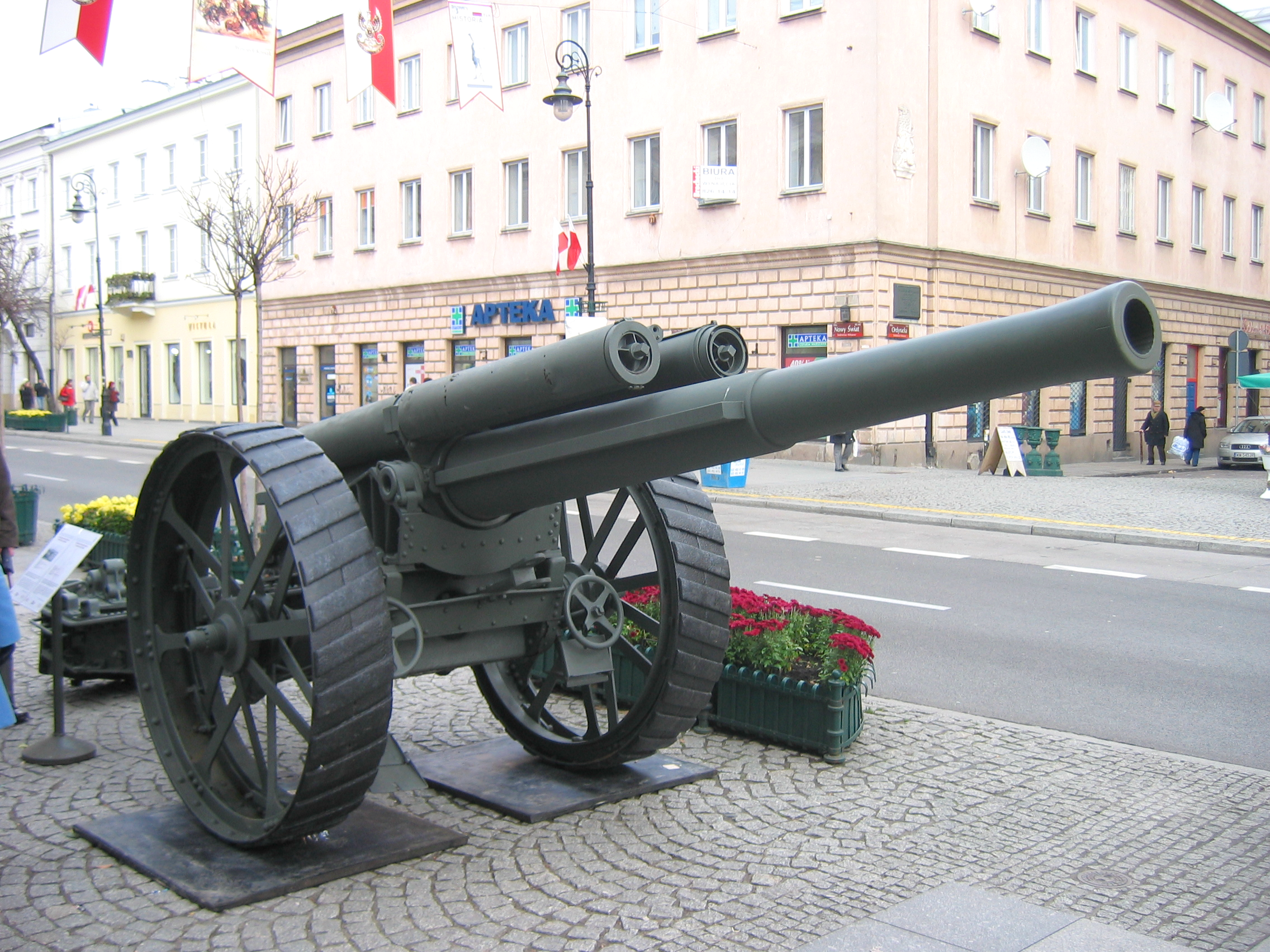
60 pounder gun of the Red Army captured by Polish soldiers during the Polish-Soviet War. Displayed during a temporary exhibition on a street in Warsaw

- Imperial War Museum, London, United Kingdom
- Royal Canadian Artillery Museum, Shilo, Manitoba, Canada
- Polish Army Museum, Warsaw, Poland
- Virginia War Museum, Newport News, Virginia. United States
- National World War I Museum, Kansas City, Missouri, United States
- Historical Military Museum of Cartagena, Spain
- Robben Island Museum, Robben Island, South Africa

=== Other surviving examples from the United States ===
- Benton Harbor, Michigan, Crystal Springs Cemetery.
- Bloomingdale, New Jersey, a MK 1 field gun stands at the entrance of Sloan Park.
- Cairo, Illinois, stands on the grounds of the Old Customs House.
- Clarion, Pennsylvania, Veterans Memorial Park (Mk II)
- Clayton, Indiana, Clayton Cemetery
- Fort Devens, Massachusetts
- Located in Wythougan Park, Knox, Indiana as a war memorial to the soldiers and sailors of World War I.
- Maywood, Illinois
- Medina, New York, manufactured by the Elswick Ordnance Company, Newcastle upon Tyne, England in 1916. Now a war memorial at State Street Park, State Street at East Center Street. The gun was restored in 2019.
- Oglesby, Illinois
- Rittman, Ohio, in the cemetery.
- Sainte Genevieve, Missouri, Veterans of Foreign Wars, Post 2210.
- Springfield, South Dakota, a MK I gun stands at Terrace Park
- Wabasha, Minnesota, a Mk II field gun stands in the center of Cannon Park, which is also at the center of the city of Wabasha.
- Auburn, California, outside the Auburn Veterans Memorial Hall
- Horicon, Wisconsin, a Mk I on a Mk II chassis sits in Bowling Green Park.

== See also ==
- List of field guns

== Bibliography ==
- "History of the Ministry of Munitions", 1922. Volume X : The Supply of Munitions. Facsimile reprint by Imperial War Museum and Naval & Military Press, 2008. ISBN 1-84734-884-X
- Clarke, Dale (2004). British Artillery 1914–1919. Field Army Artillery. New Vanguard 94. Oxford UK: Osprey Publishing. ISBN 1-84176-688-7.
- Nigel F Evans, Ordnance B.L. 60 pr Gun Mks 2 & 2* on Carriage 60 pr Mk 4P
- General Sir Martin Farndale, History of the Royal Regiment of Artillery. Western Front 1914–18. London: Royal Artillery Institution, 1986 ISBN 1-870114-00-0
- Major-General Sir John Headlam, The History of the Royal Artillery – from the Indian Mutiny to the Great War, Volume II 1899–1914, 1934. Facsimile reprint by Naval and Military Press 2005. ISBN 978-1-84574-043-6
- Hogg, Ian V. (1989). Allied Artillery of World War One. Ramsbury: The Crowood Press. ISBN 1-86126-104-7.
- I.V. Hogg & L.F. Thurston, British Artillery Weapons & Ammunition 1914–1918. London: Ian Allan, 1972
- Handbook of artillery: including mobile, anti-aircraft and trench matériel 1920. United States Army Ordnance Dept. May 1920 – via Internet Archive.
- Major General BP Hughes, History of the Royal Regiment of Artillery – Between the Wars 1919–39. London: Brassey's, 1992. ISBN 978-0-08-040984-9
- War Office (1907). Handbook for the 60-PR B.L. Gun, Mark I (Land Service). London: His Majesty's Stationery Office.
- War Office (1921). Handbook of the B.L. 60-PR., Marks II & II* Guns on Mark IV Field Carriage: Land service. London: His Majesty's Stationery Office.
