= Historical Military Museum of Cartagena (Spain) =

Museo Histórico Militar de Cartagena
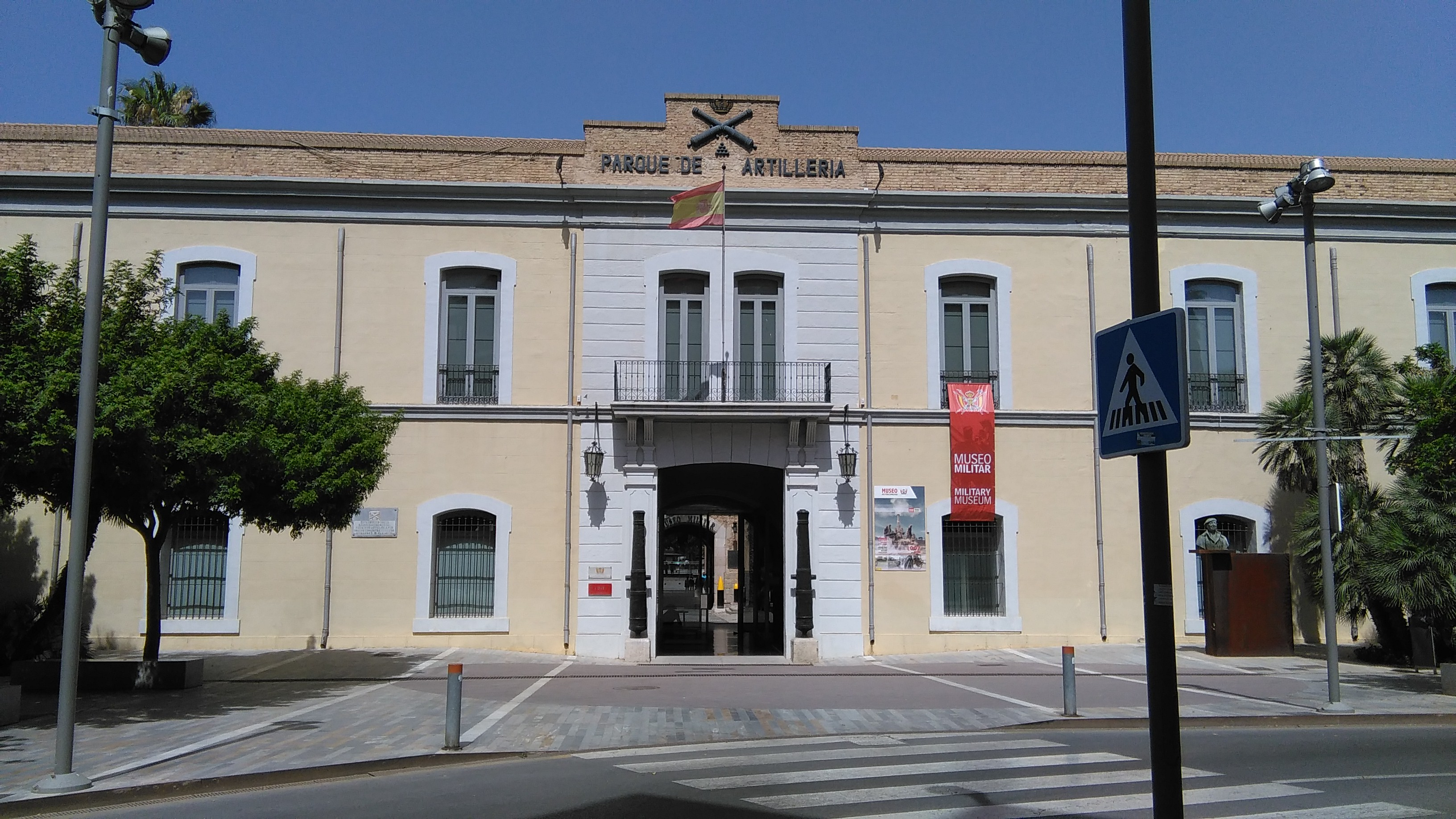
- Main wing
- Established: 1997
- Location: Plaza General López Pinto, Cartagena, Murcia Spain
- Coordinates: 37°36′16.56″N 0°59′7.4″W
- Type: Military museum
- Visitors: 24.000 (2015)
- Website: www.ejercito.mde.es/unidades/Madrid/ihycm/Museos/cartagena.html

The Museo Histórico Militar de Cartagena (Historical Military Museum of Cartagena) is a military museum dedicated to Spanish Army History. It is located in Cartagena, Spain.

== The Building ==
The building was originally rectangular in shape. It had an area of 17,302 m2, formed by four pavilions and a central one that divided it into two bodies with its two courtyards. The Patio of Weapons or Ironworks is the one that is totally conserved.

The first body of the current building is used by the Municipal Archive of Cartagena, the rest is the Museum.

== History of the building ==
It was designed by the architect Mateo Vodopich and built between 1777 and 1786.

== Units ==
- Royal Artillery Park, 1786-1802
- 2nd Department of Artillery Armoury Workshop, 1802-1867
- Command Headquarters and Coast Artillery Park, 1867-1924
- Coastal Artillery Regiment, 1924-1984
- Anti-aircraft Artillery Regiment number 73, 1984-1996
- Museum of Artillery, 1997

== Wars ==
- War of the Spanish Independence | War of the Independence, 1808-1814
- First site of the Plaza, Trienio Liberal, General Torrijos, 1823
- Second site of the Plaza, 'Esparterista uprising', General Ruíz Martínez, 1844
- Third site of the Plaza, Cantonal uprising, General Contreras, 1873-1874
- Spanish Civil War, 1936-1939

== The museum ==
Inaugurated on June 11, 1997 by Mr. Alfonso Pardo de Santayana y Coloma, General Chief of the Maneuver Force and the Military Region of Levante, it is a Delegated Section of the Historical Military Museum of Seville. It is distributed in several rooms and two floors, with an exhibiting surface of about 3520 m2 around a central courtyard, and covers the history of the different arms of the Army, focusing especially on the Artillery weapon.

You can see the displays and fortifications that protected the naval base of Cartagena through dioramas, models and projections, as well as several information panels in English and Spanish.

For people with mobility limitations, access to the Patio of Ironworks does not cause any problems since there are ramps available for access to the different rooms. There is no lift to go up to the first floor.

=== Patio ===
- Of Weapons and Ironworks, completely paved, is surrounded by 24 round arches. Around it the entire ground floor of the building revolves.
- In the body of what was the central building, a projectile that did not explode from the Cantonal Uprising can be observed.
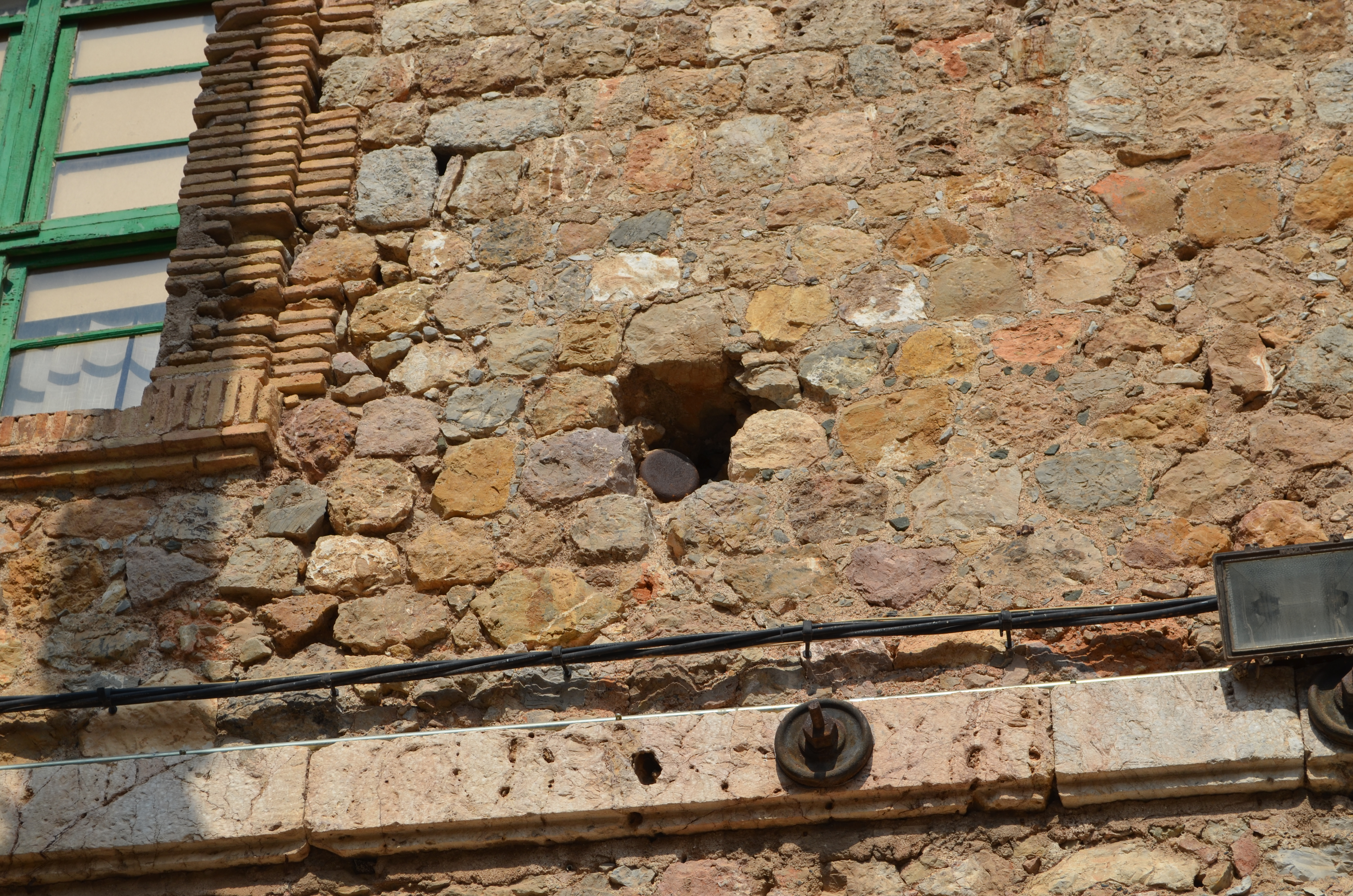

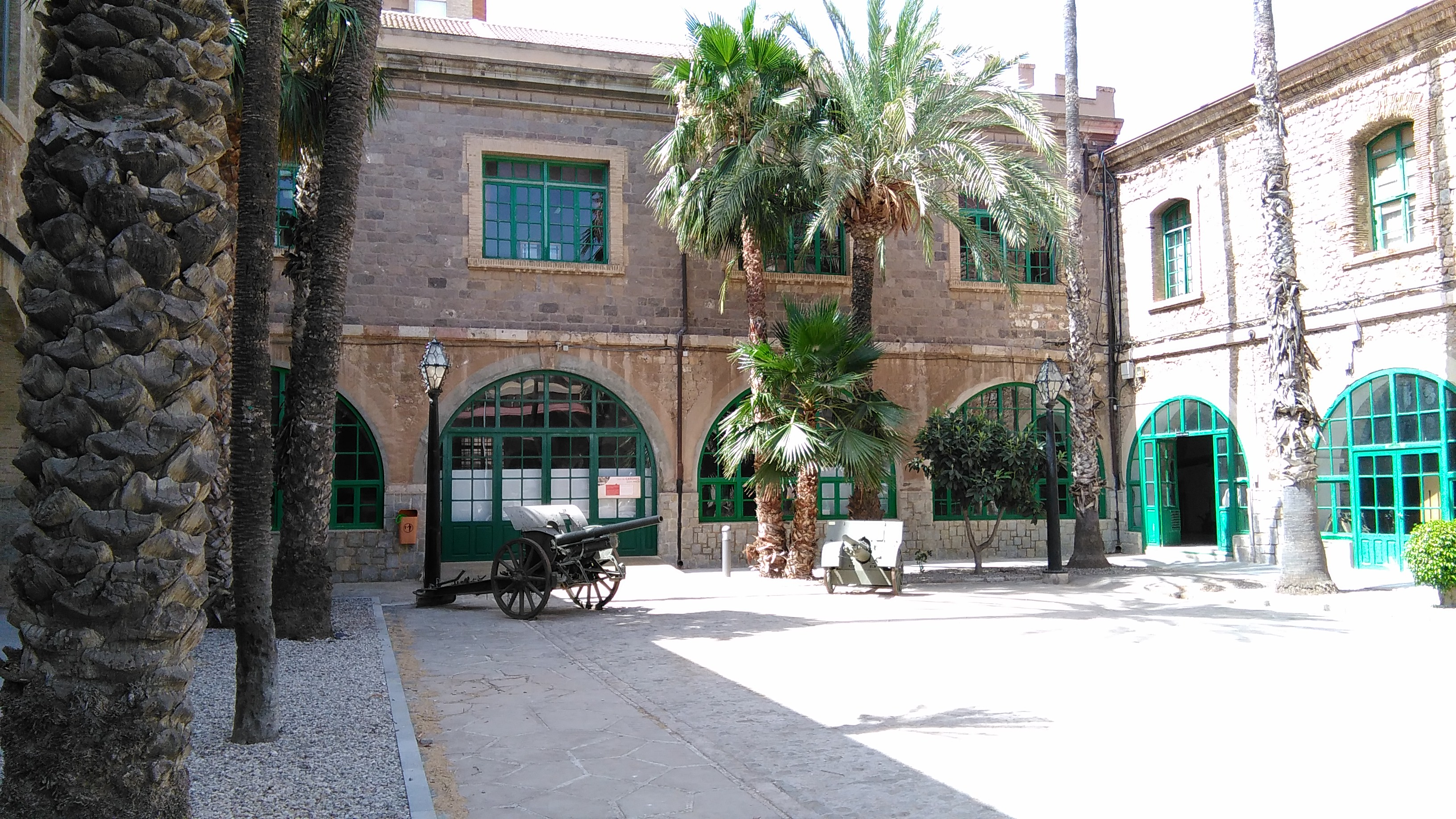

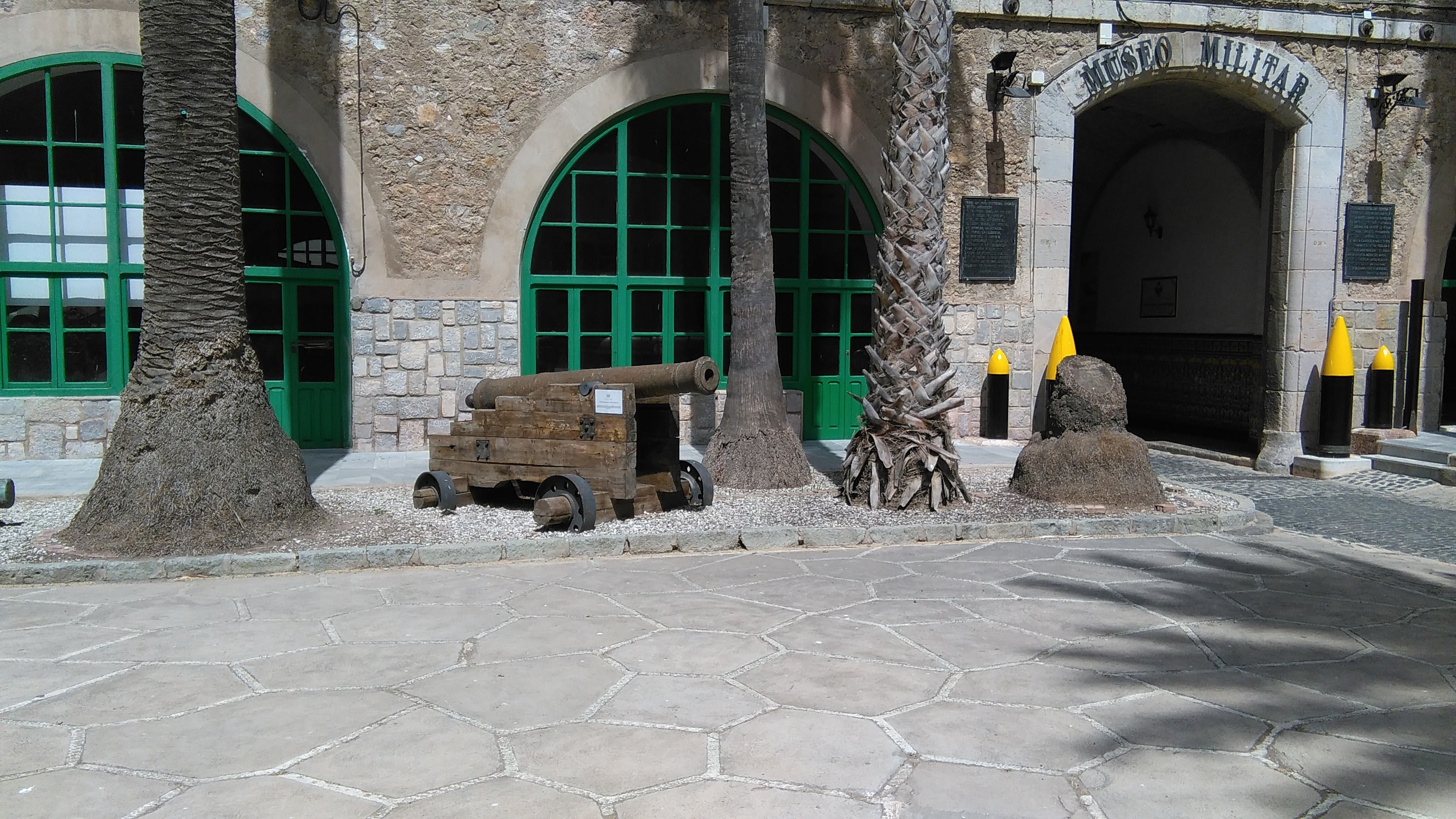

=== Ground floor ===
- Divided according to the material that shows: anti-aircraft guns, campaign (mountain, mortars, anti-tank defences, campaign, etc.) and coast. It shows different material used by the Spanish Army of diverse origin: Italian, French, German, Russian, Spanish, British, etc.
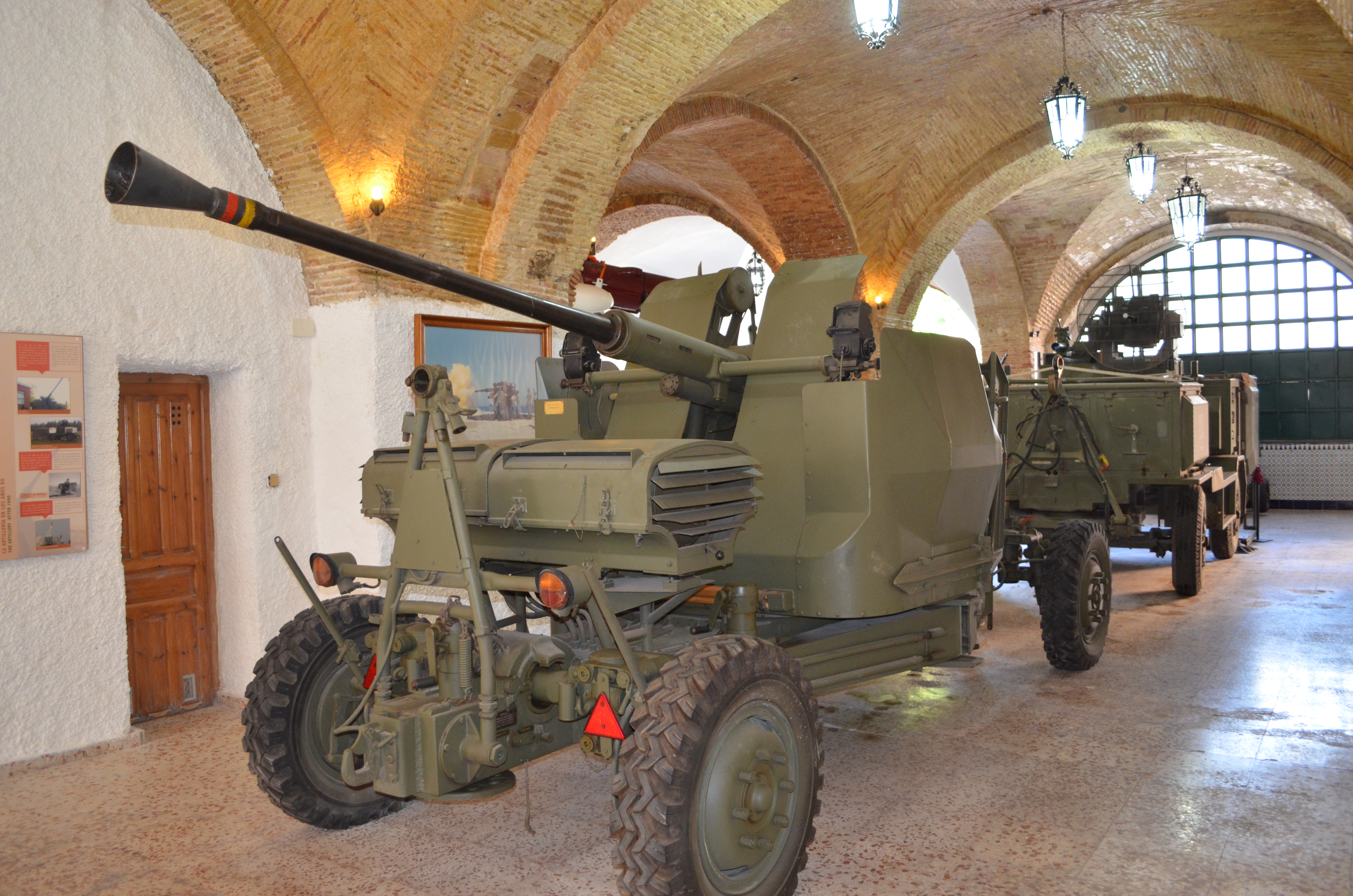

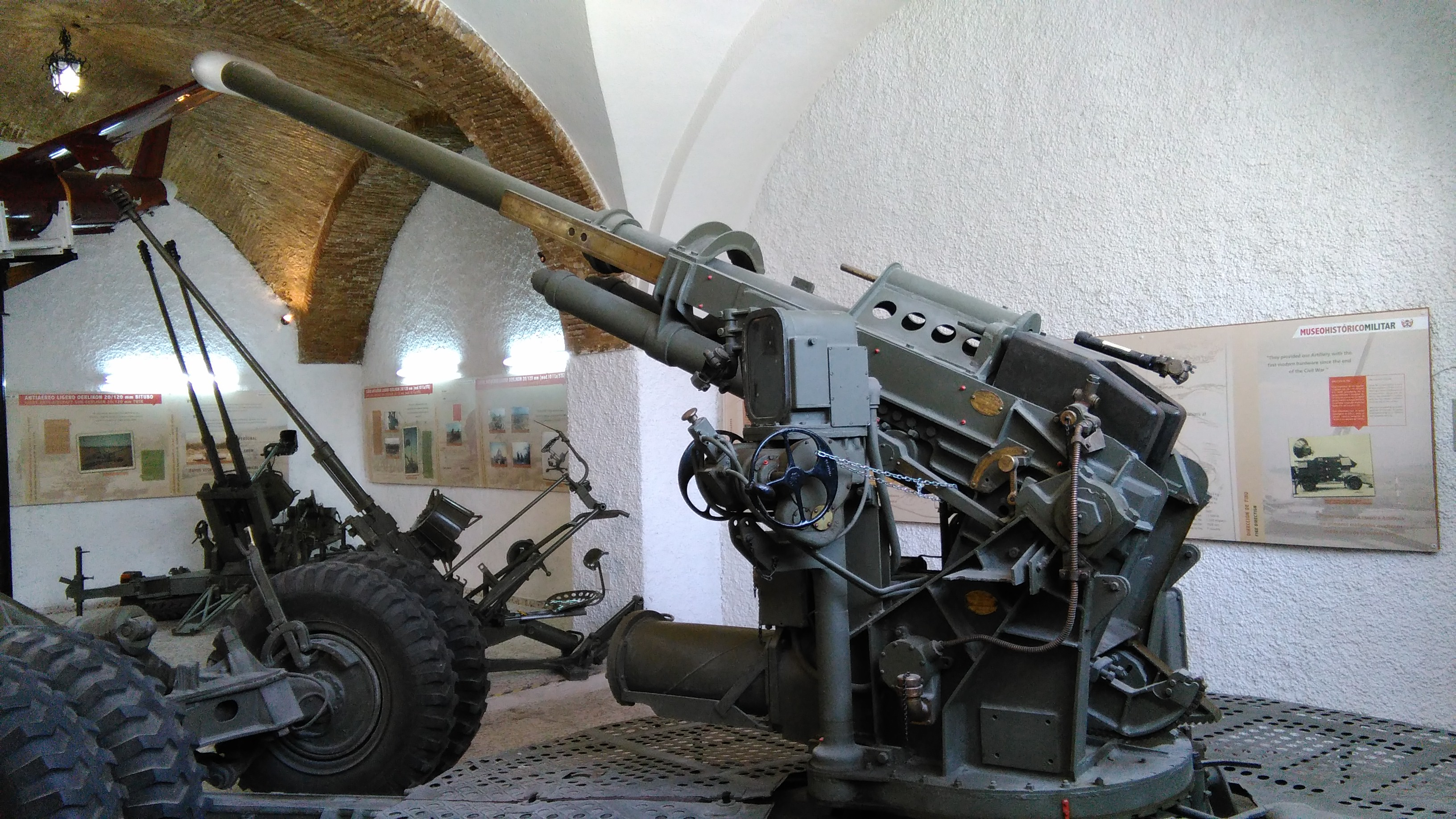

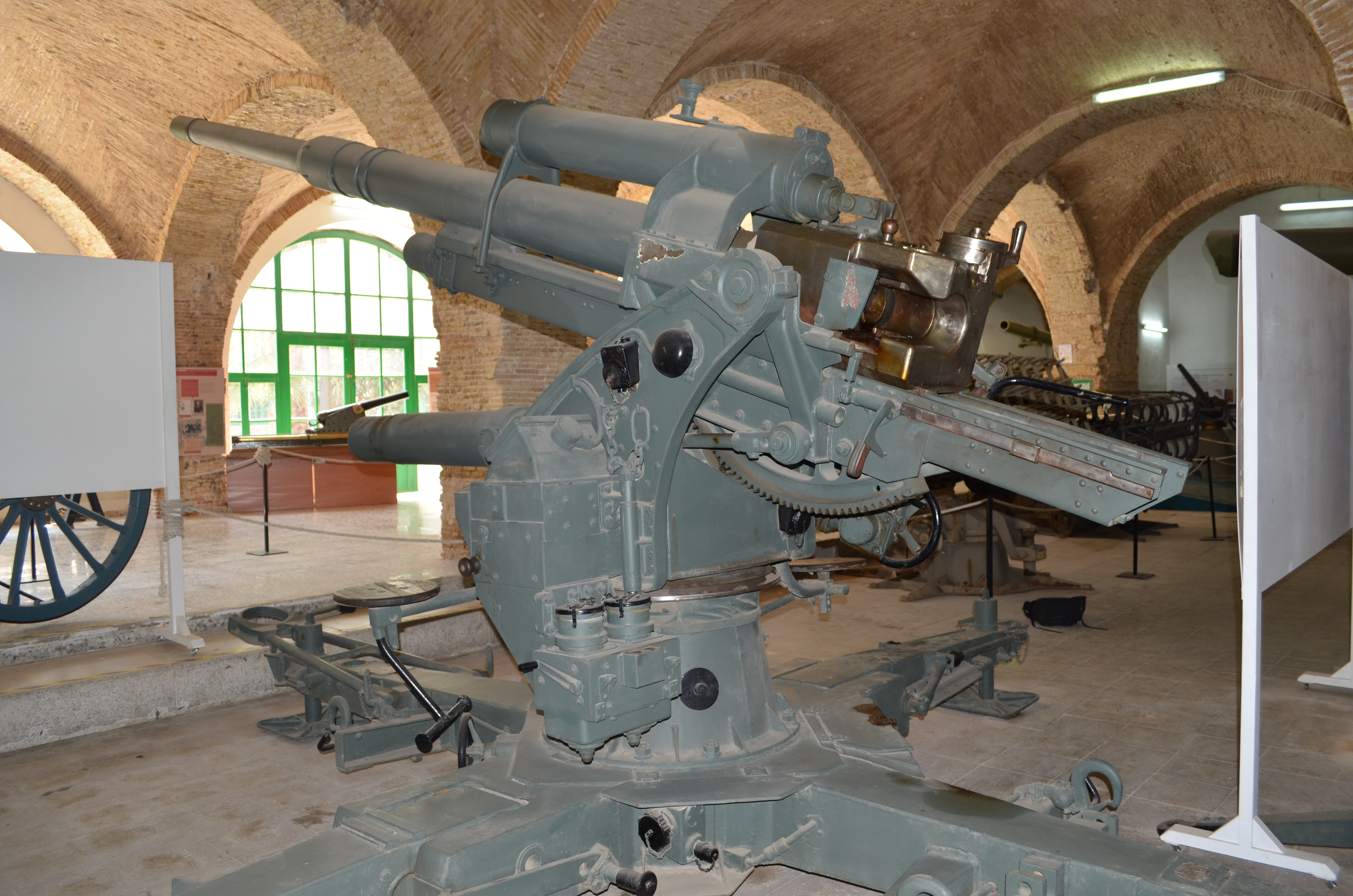

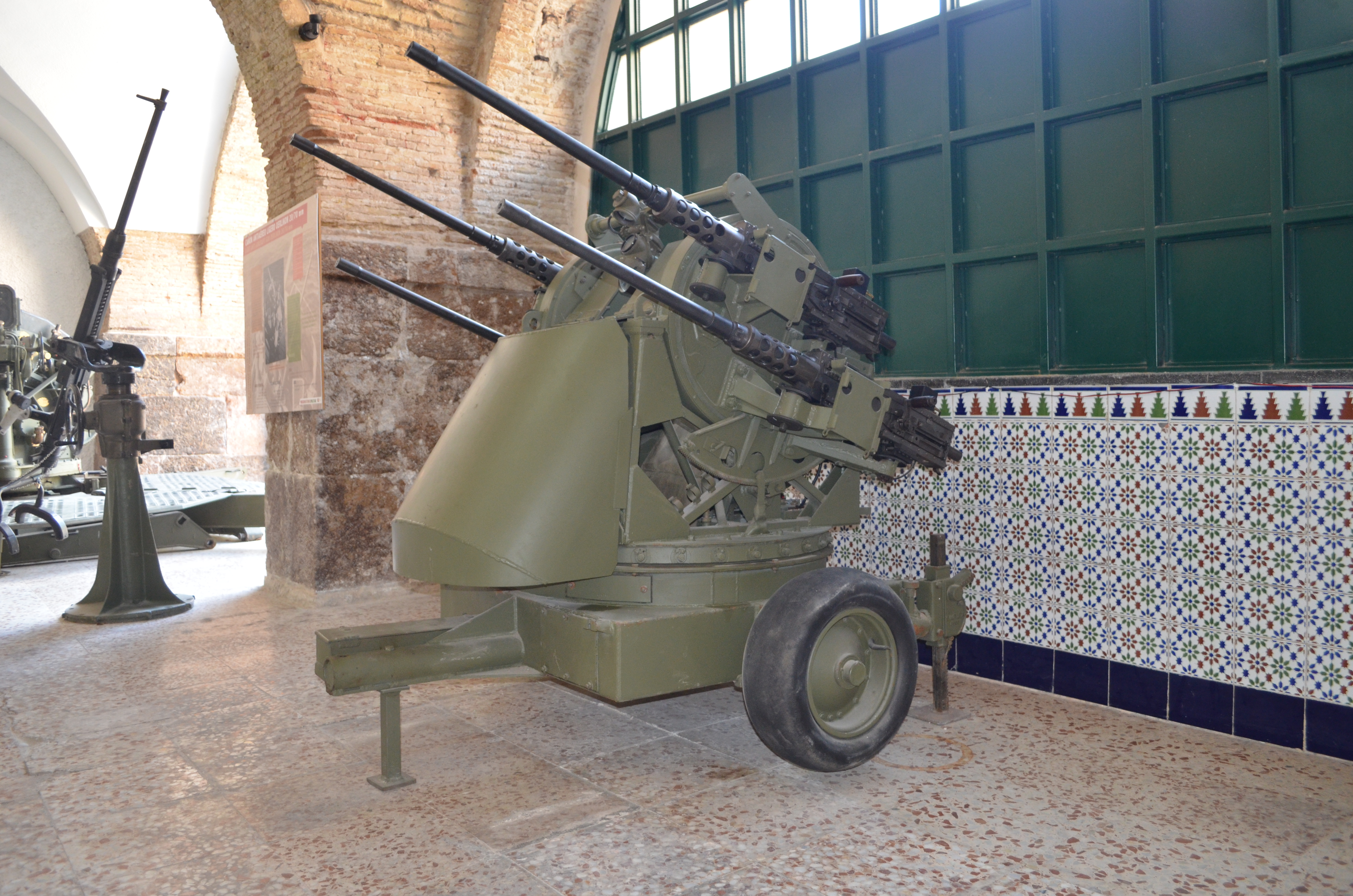

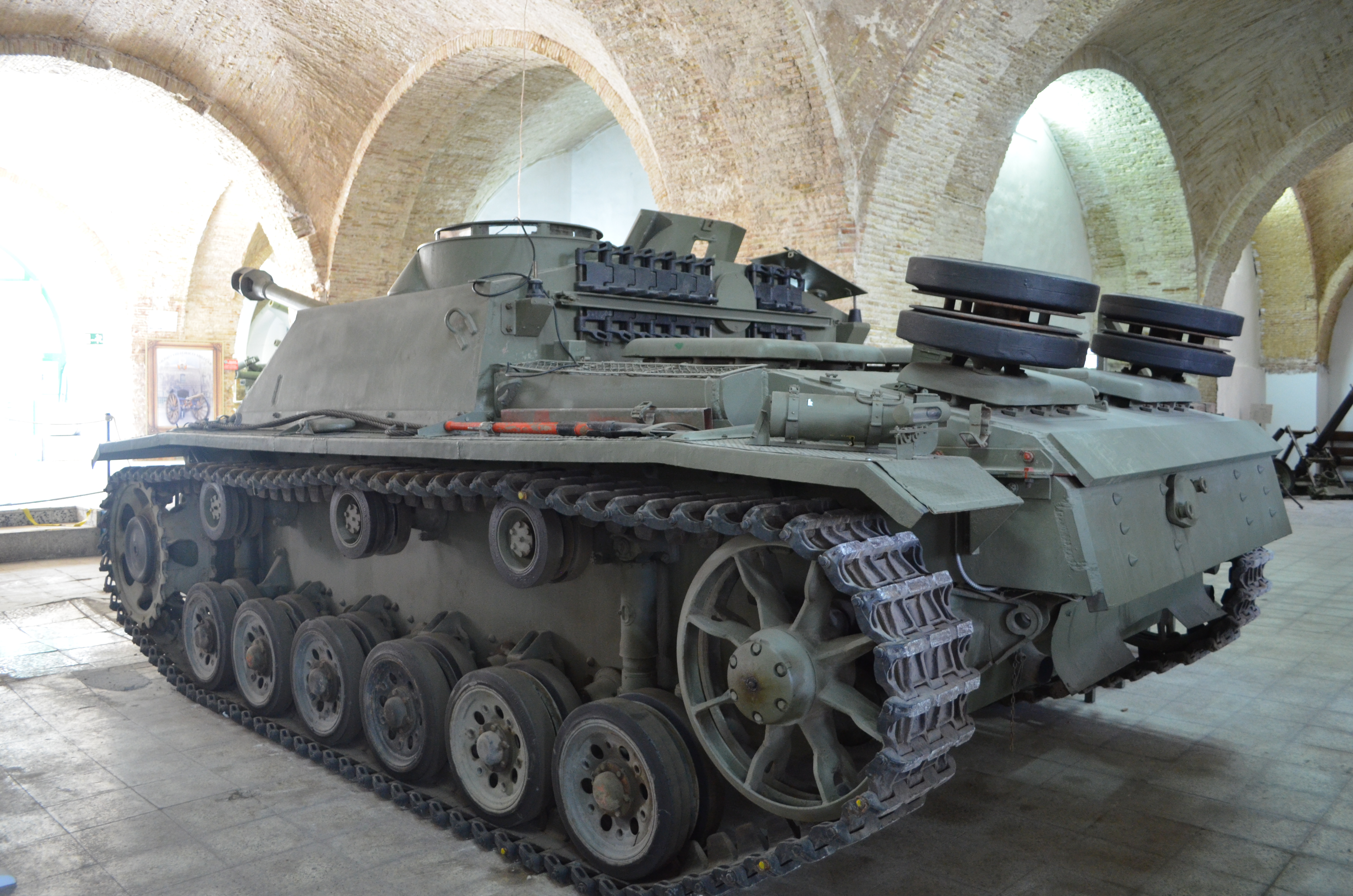

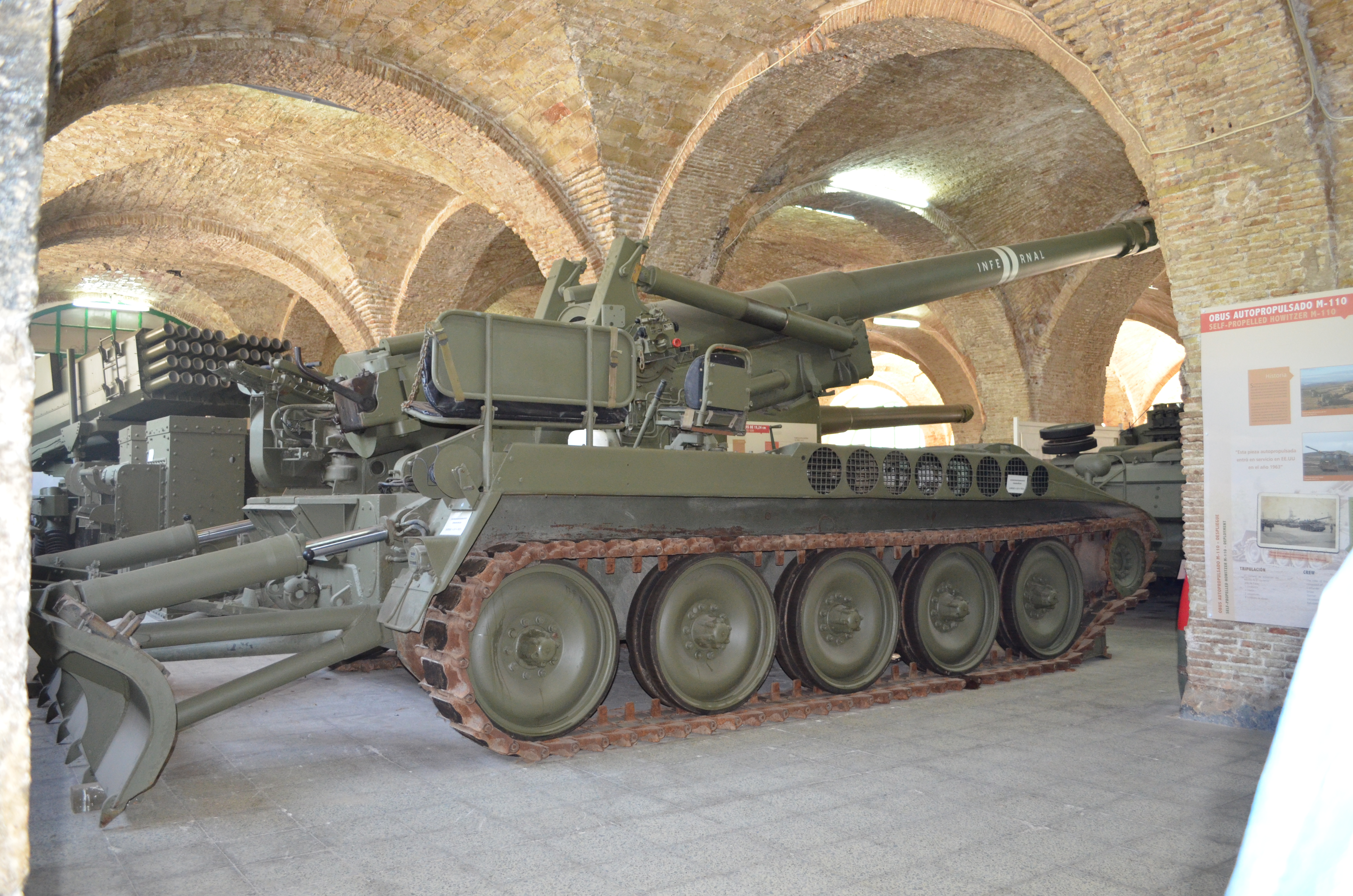

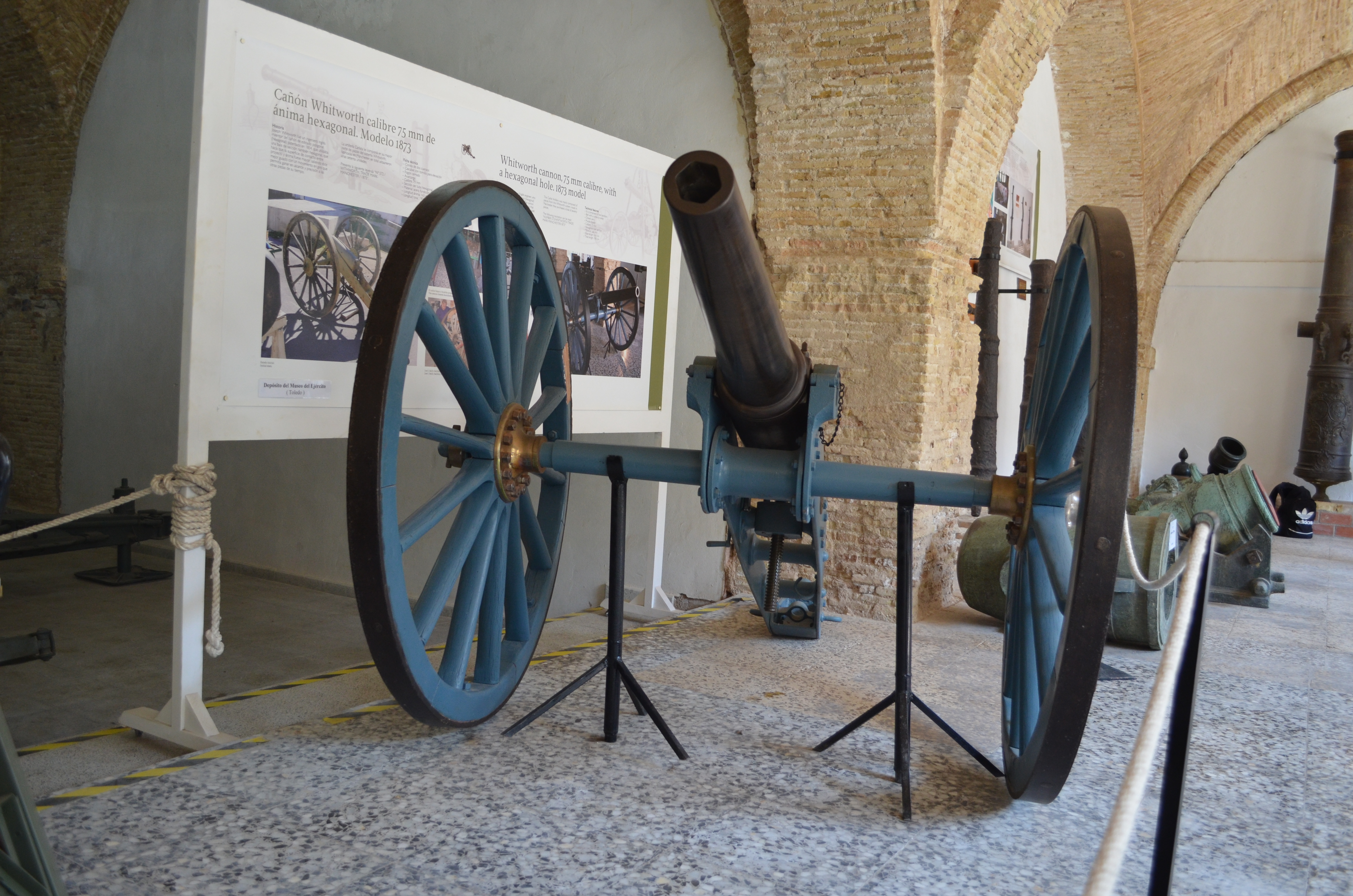

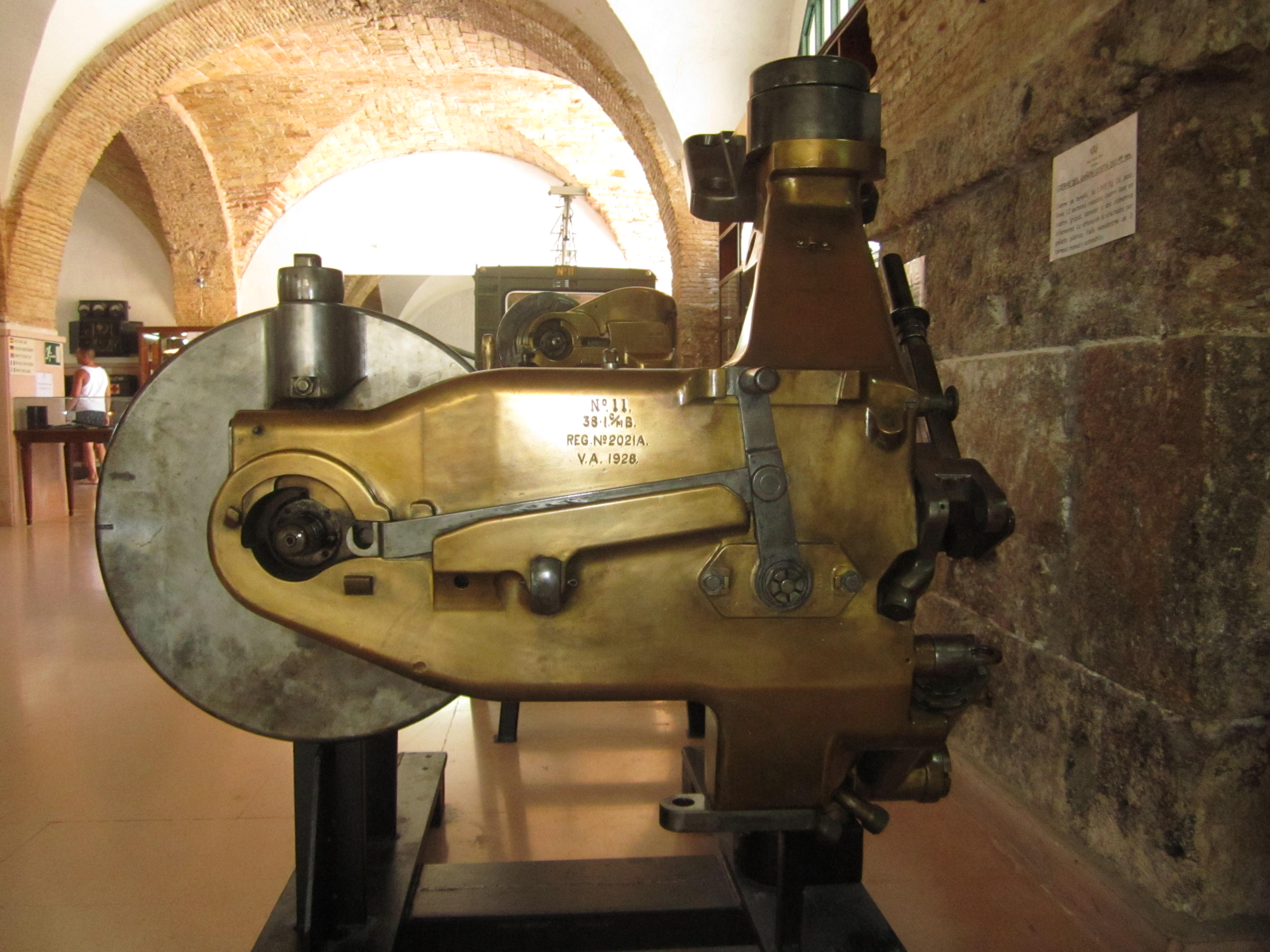

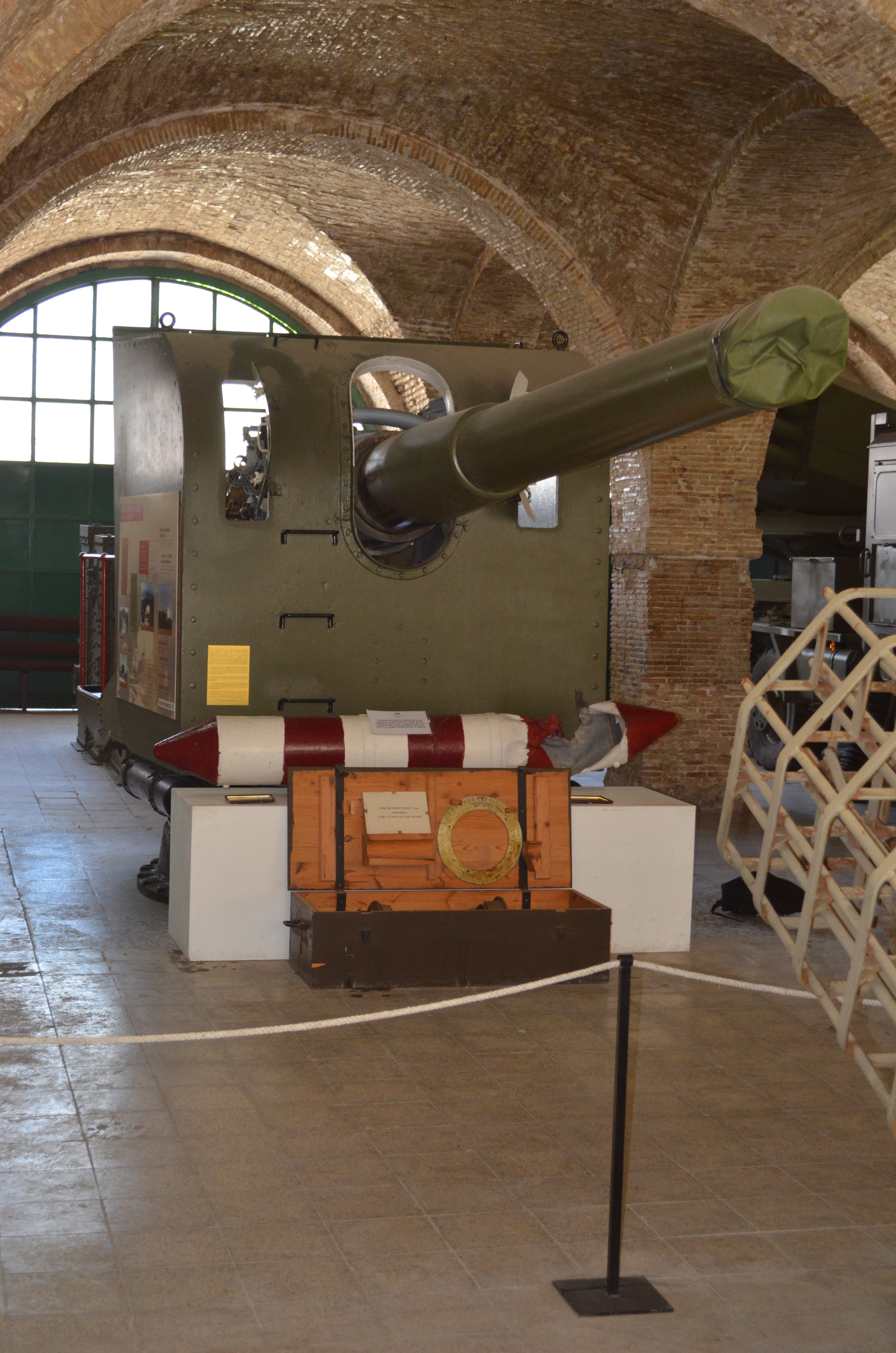

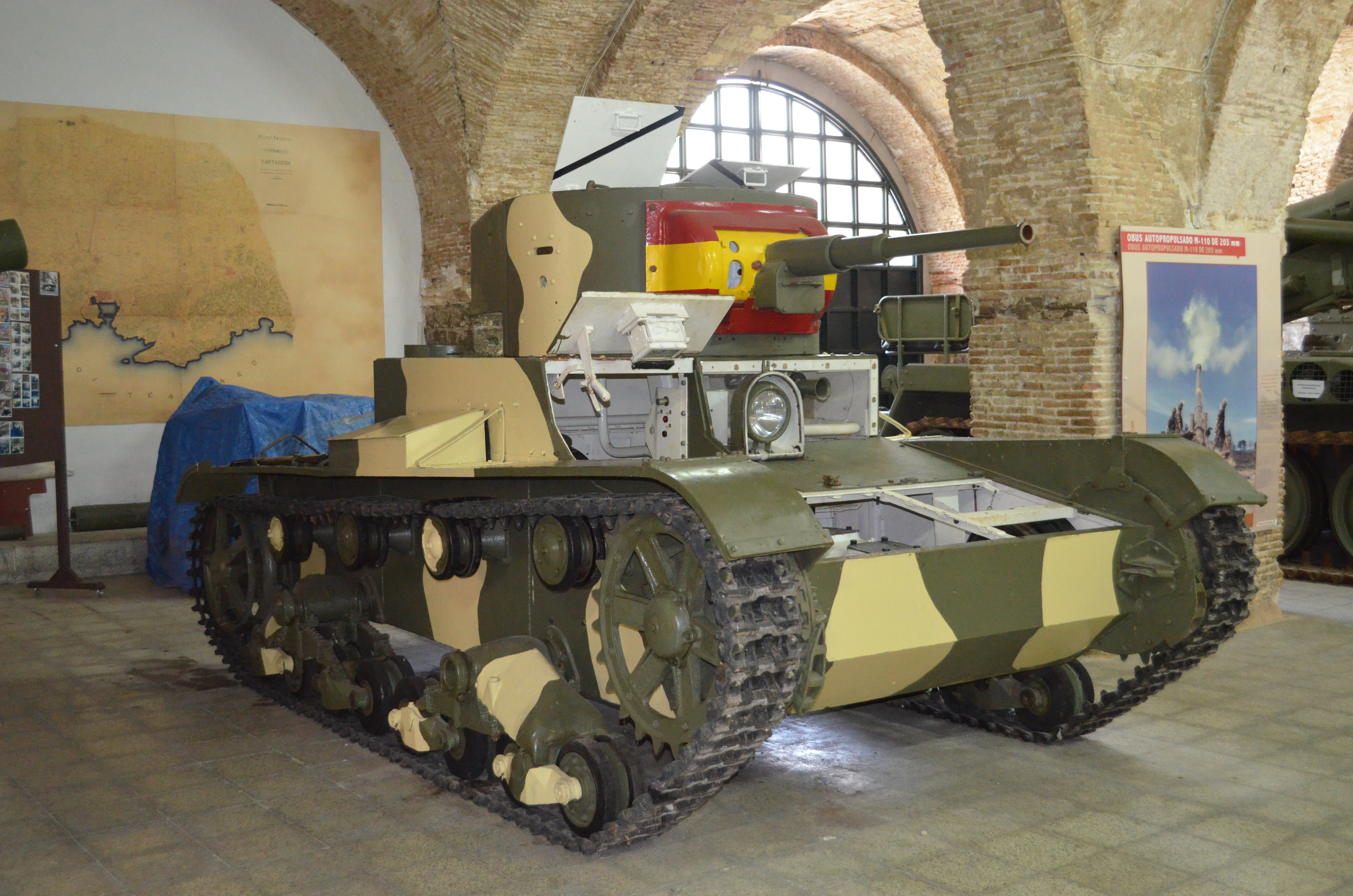

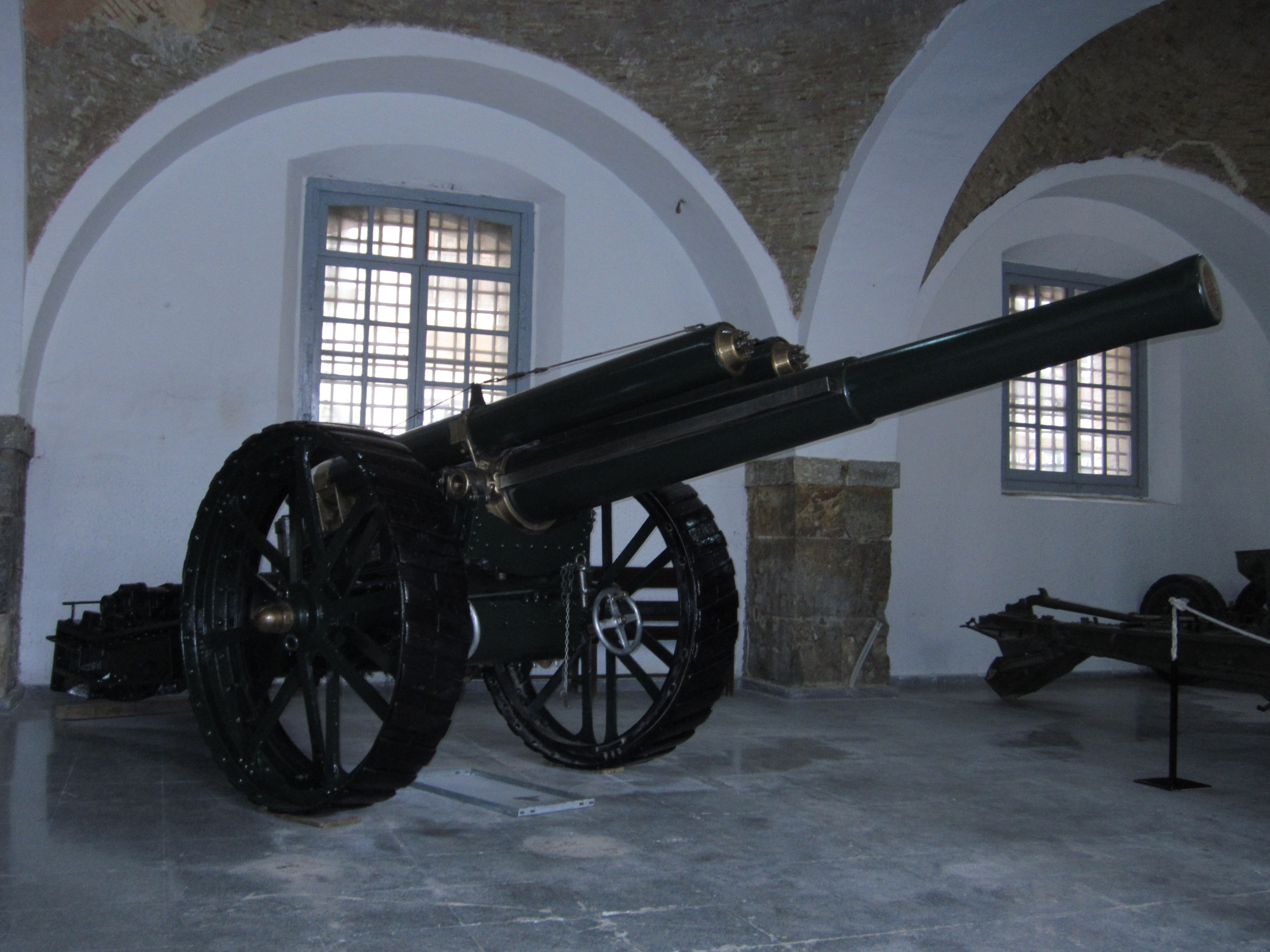
- Sacristy and chapel, with an image of Santa Barbara, patron saint of the Artillery, attributed to Salzillo or his disciple Roque López, is of the 18th century. According to the Museum it is the work of the sculptor Roque López. During Holy Week, it hosts the Throne of the Brotherhood San Juan.

- Three images of the San Juan Group of the California Brotherhood can also be seen: the Virgin of the Vuelta del Calvario, San Juan Evangelista and the Christ of the Judgment of Jesus, the latter, by the sculptor José Sánchez Lozano.
- Ammunition rooms, antiaircraft artillery room, optics and telemetry room, engineering room and a passageway, which connects the two courtyards of the Museum. On the right there are stairs leading up to the first floor. On that ladder, the Colonel of the Artillery Regiment, Gerardo Armentia Palacios, died on the first landing, on March 7, 1939, in the assault of the 206th Mixed Brigade of the People's Army of the Republic.
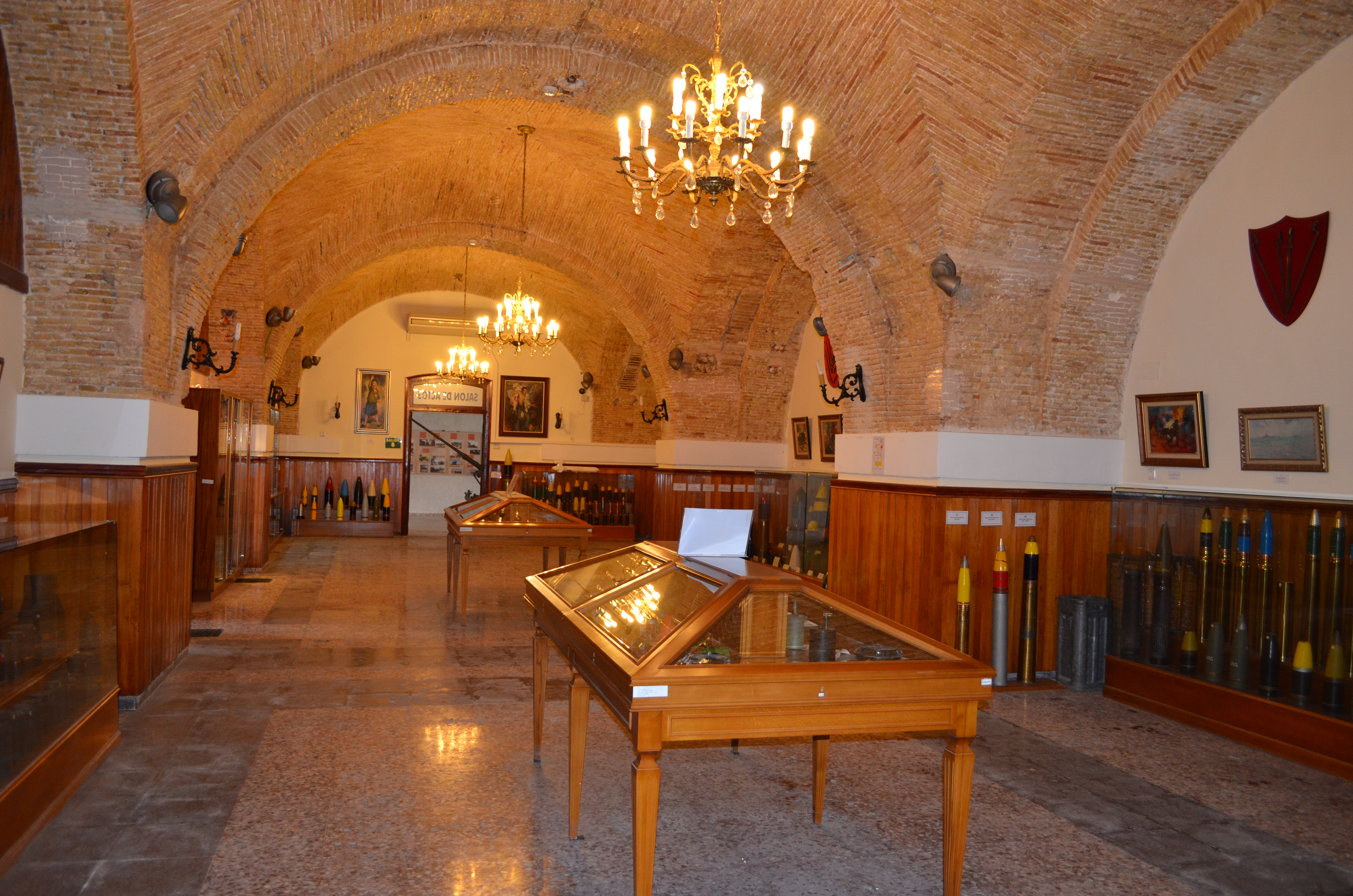

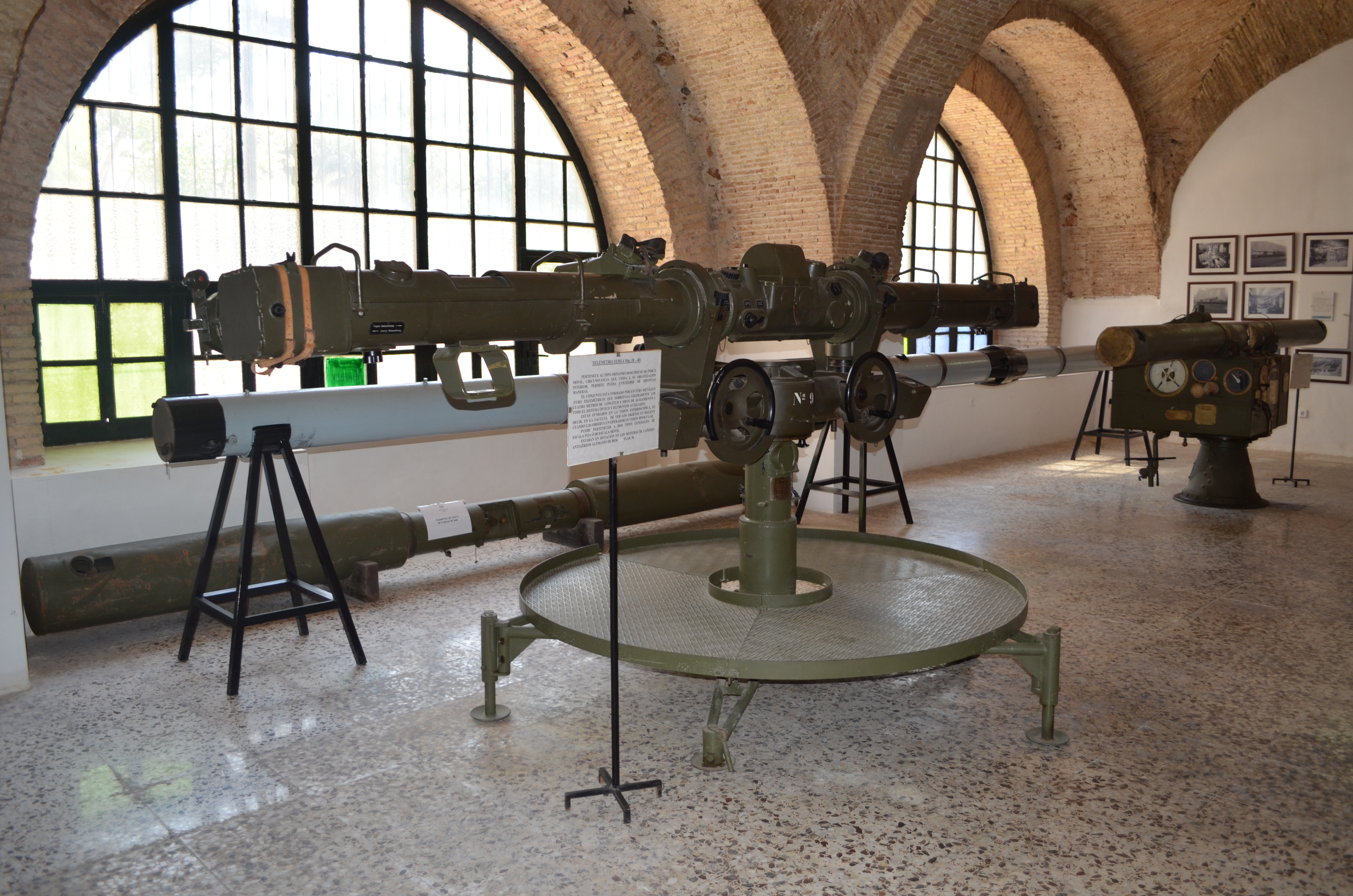
- It is decorated with tile and several plates with the history of the building, as the visit of King Alfonso XII of Spain.

=== First floor ===
- The staircase ends on the first floor, the library on the left, on the right the noble gallery or of colonels and opposite one of the rooms where the beginnings of the artillery in Cartagena until the 20th century are shown through a permanent exhibition Cartagena Plaza Fuerte 1503-1996. These rooms continue in the gallery of colonels.
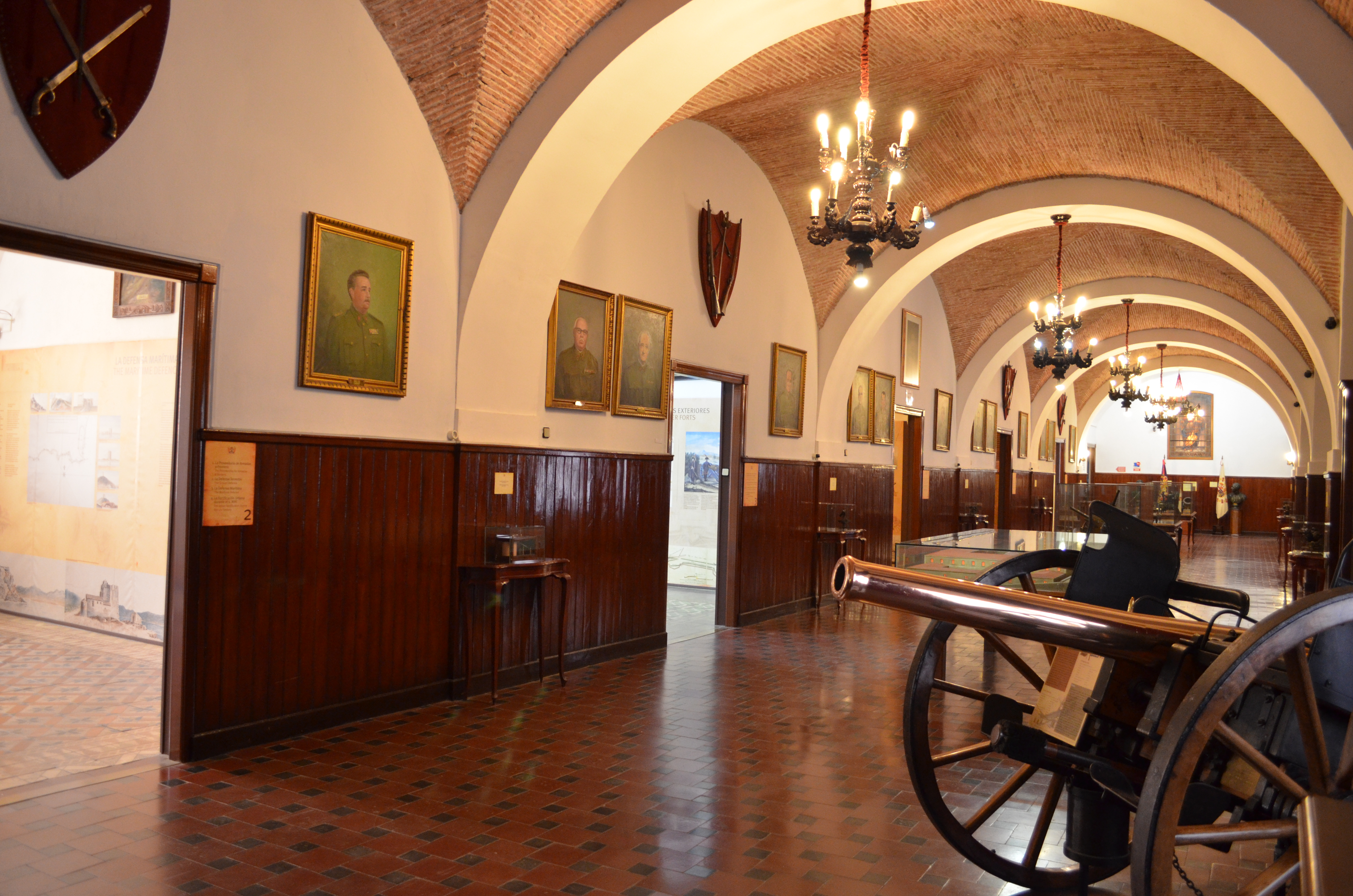

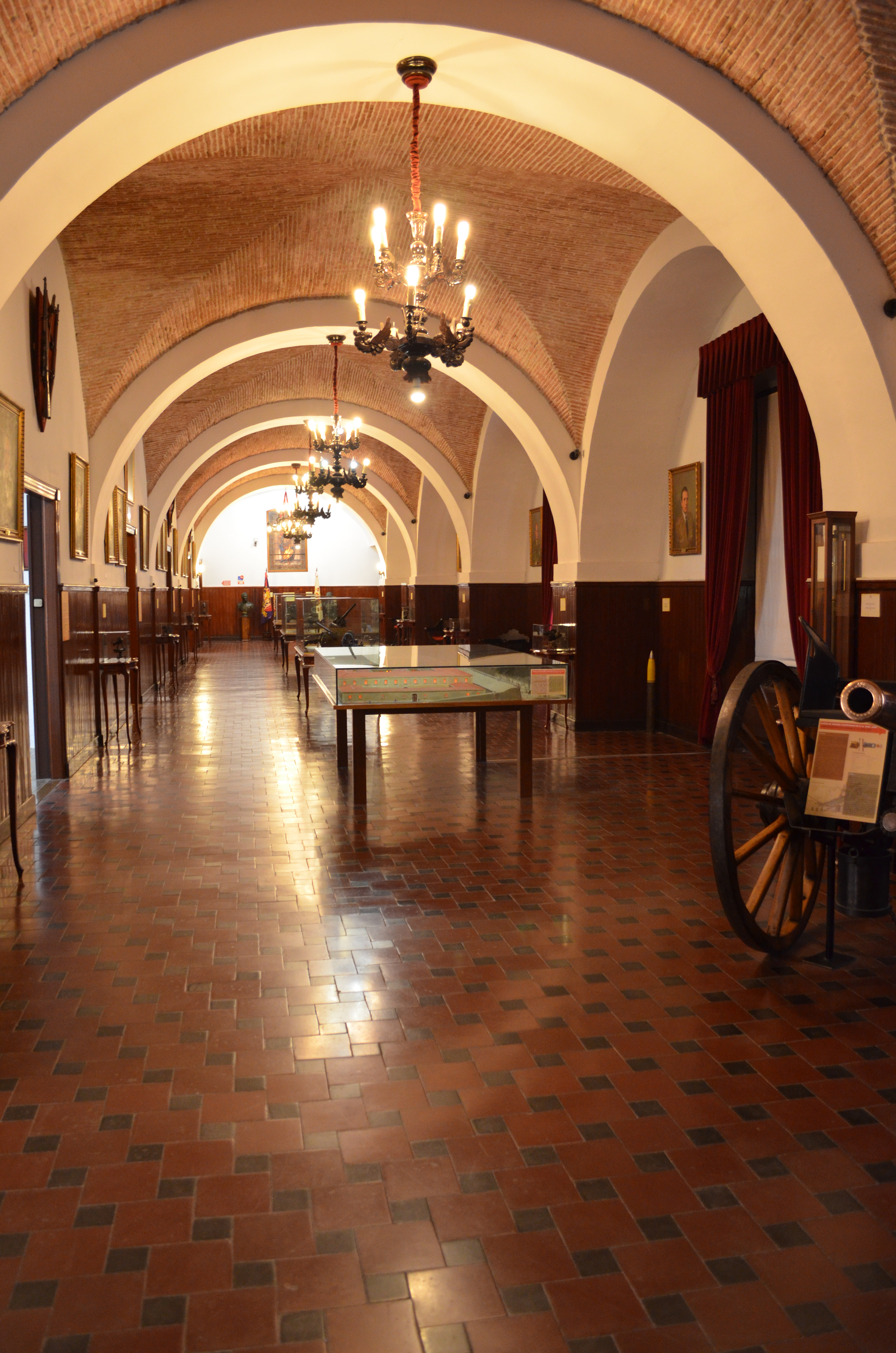
- In one of the rooms it is being built a model where it will be shown how was the city of Cartagena at the end of the 18th century.
- Highlighting the office of the Head of the Group of Coast, located in Cabo del Agua, from that office, there installed Lieutenant Colonel Arturo Espá Ruíz directed operations in the Spanish Civil War. A model of the ship Castillo de Olite is shown.
- First banner of the Regiment, year 1710, and flag of the Artillery Command, year 1802, next to the busts of the captains Daoíz and Velarde and the mortar El Jilguero, under an image of Santa Bárbara.
- Dispatch of the Chief of the artillery in the city of Cartagena. Converted into Command Post in times of crisis from the War of Independence to the Civil War of 1936-1939.
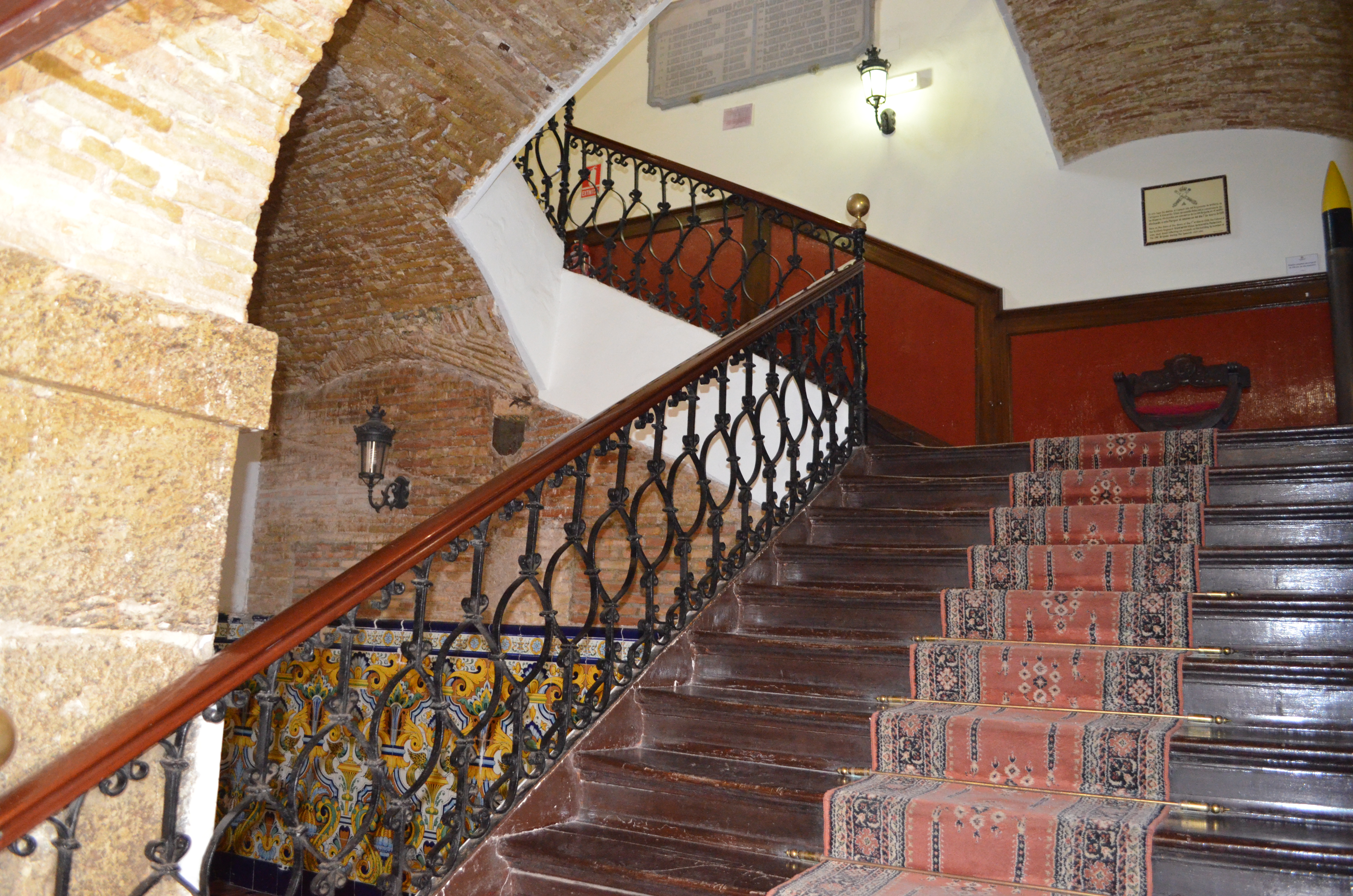

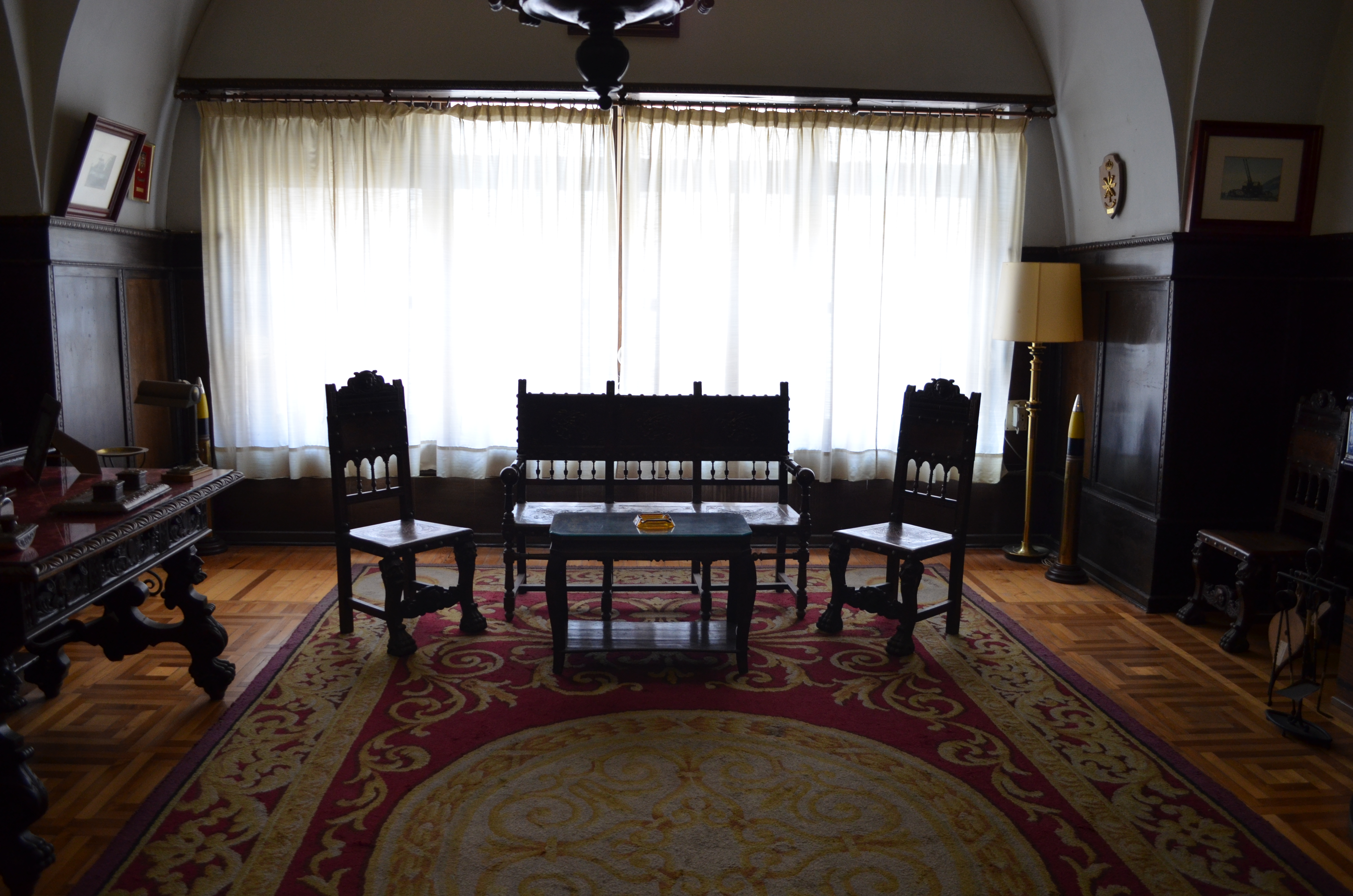
- Room of Mechanized Brigade XXXII, room of light armament, room of uniforms, room of models with a total of 1 of 2750 figures, yielded by the cartagenero gift Francisco J. Sánchez Abril. It has two guinness awards, mainly focused on tanks.
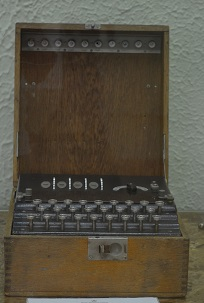

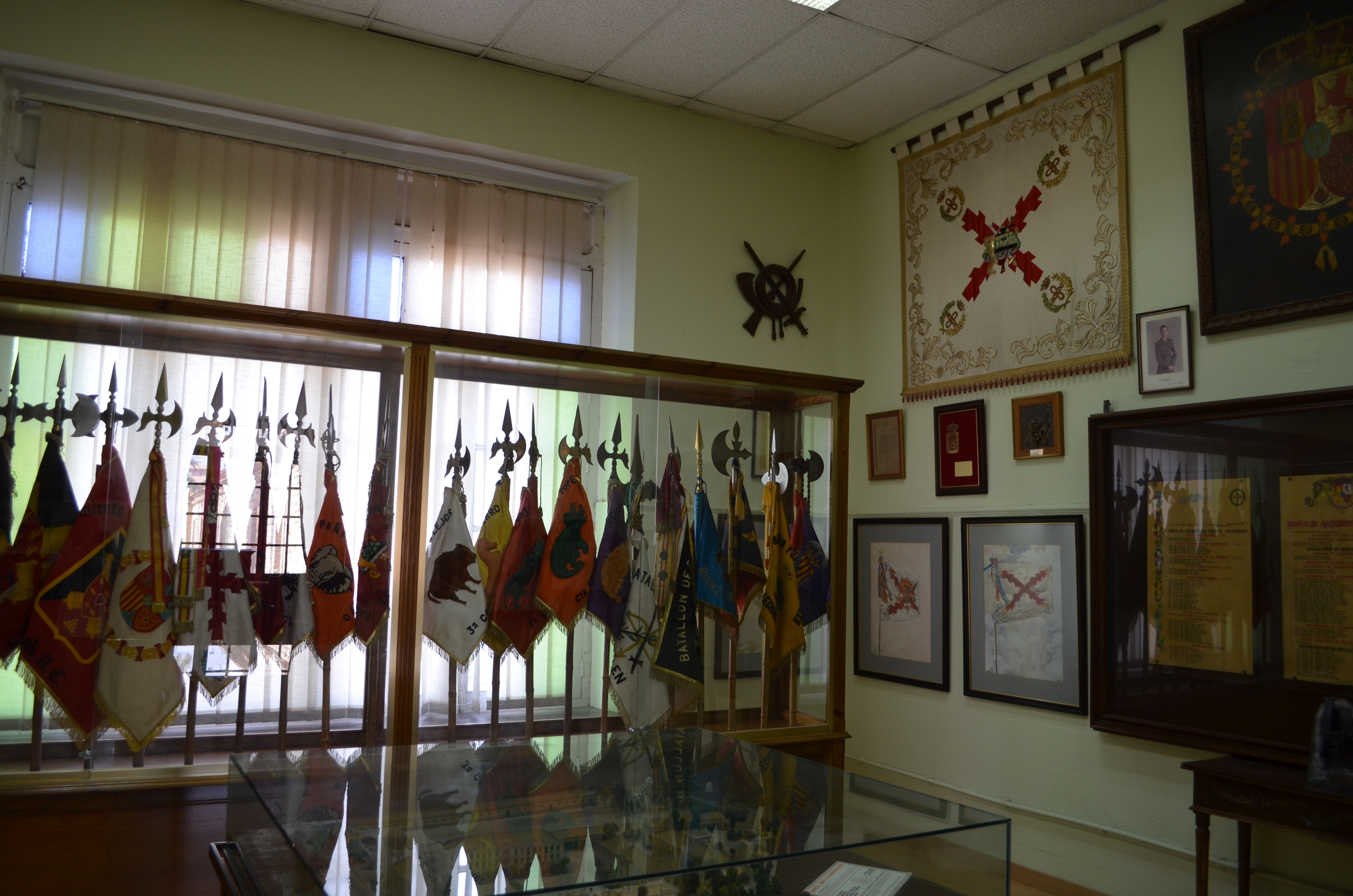

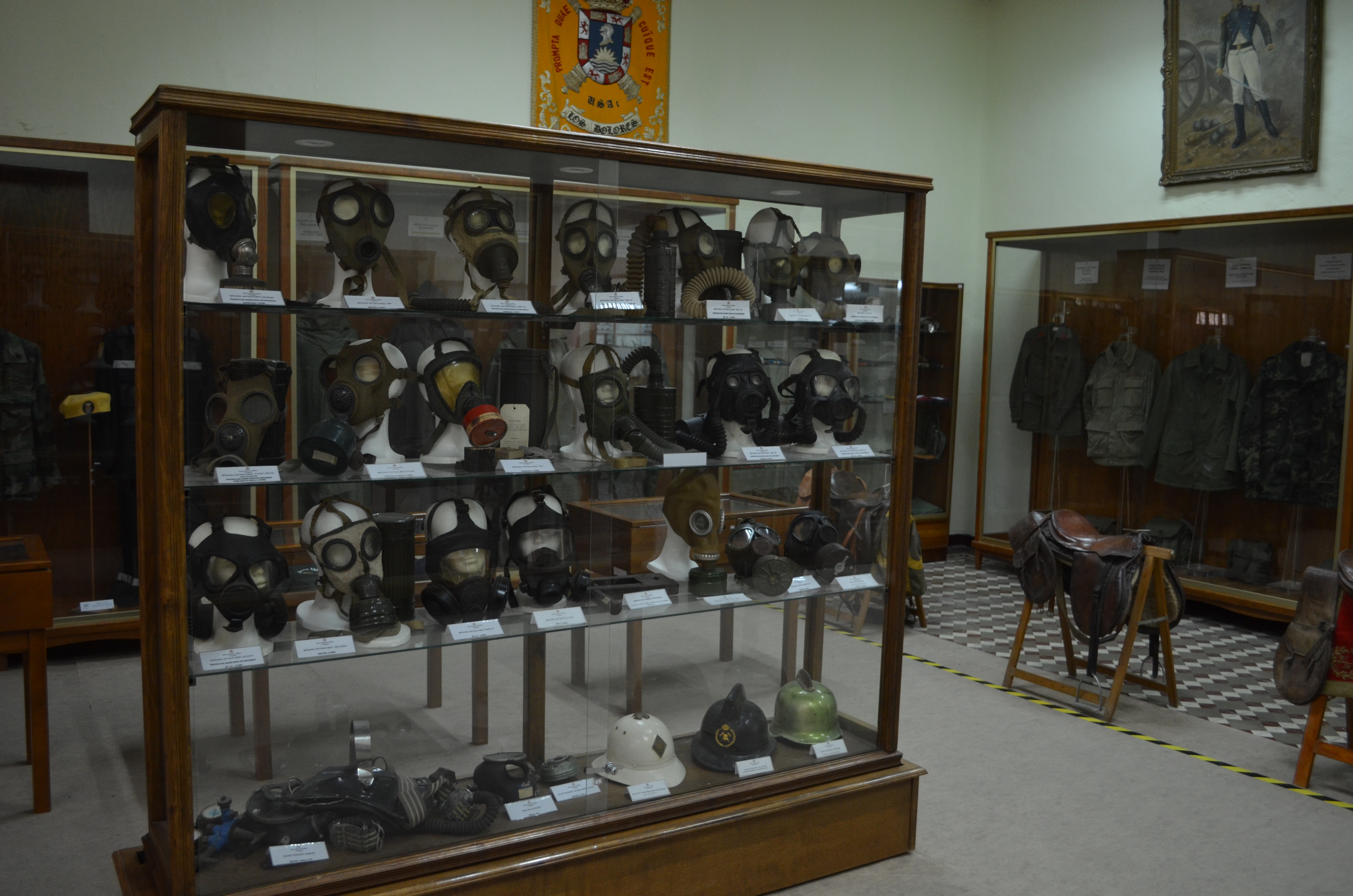

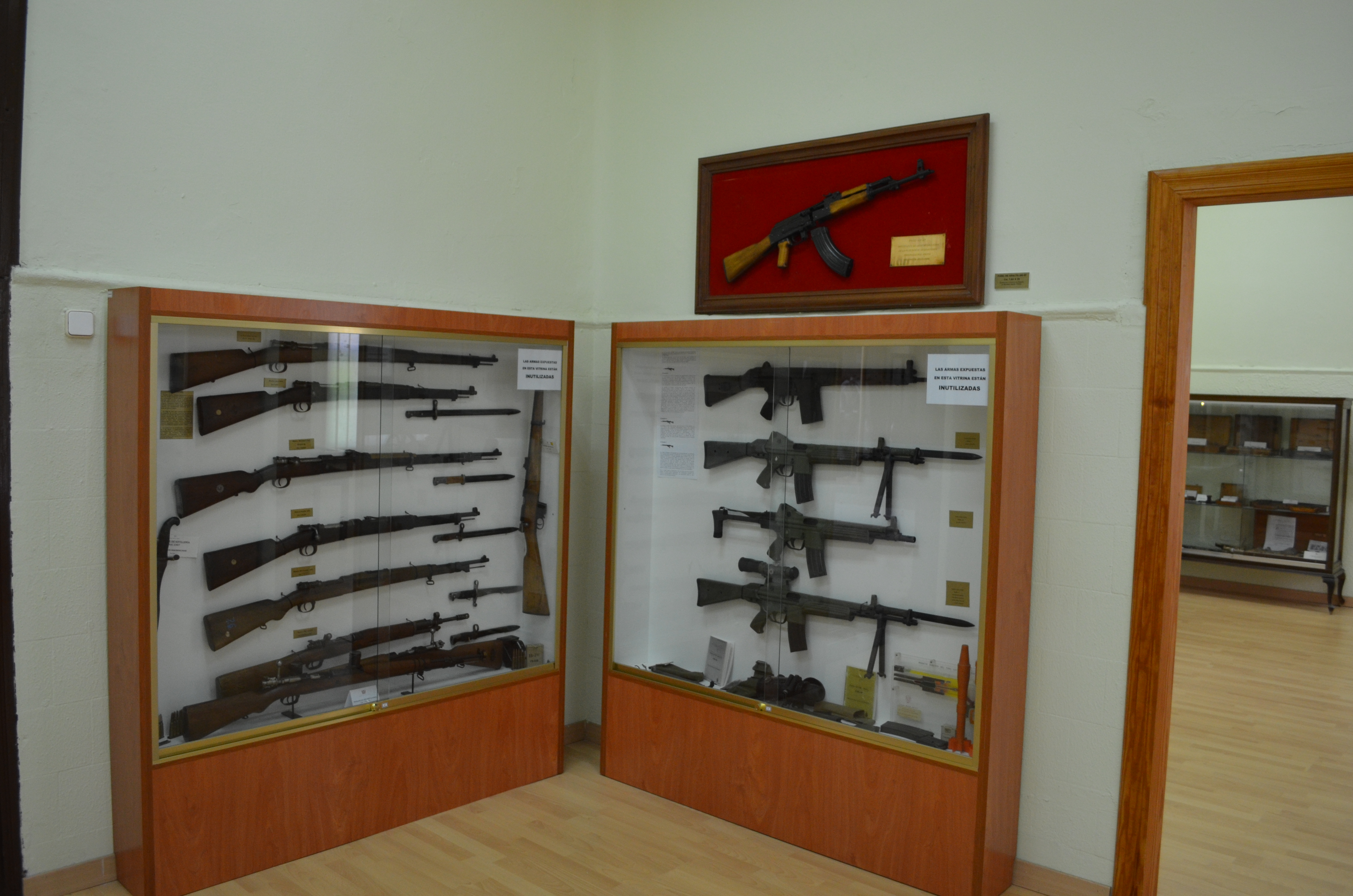

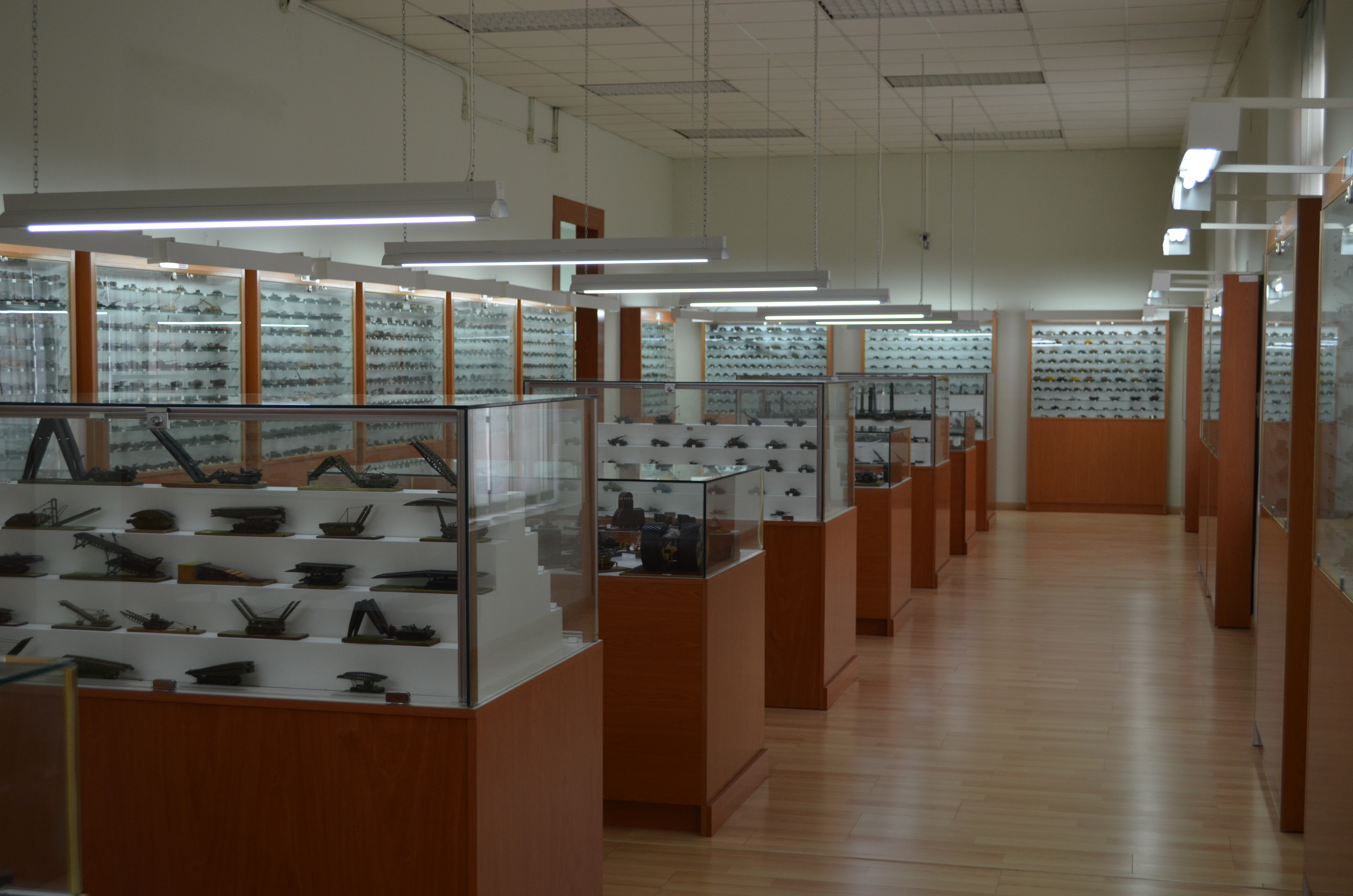

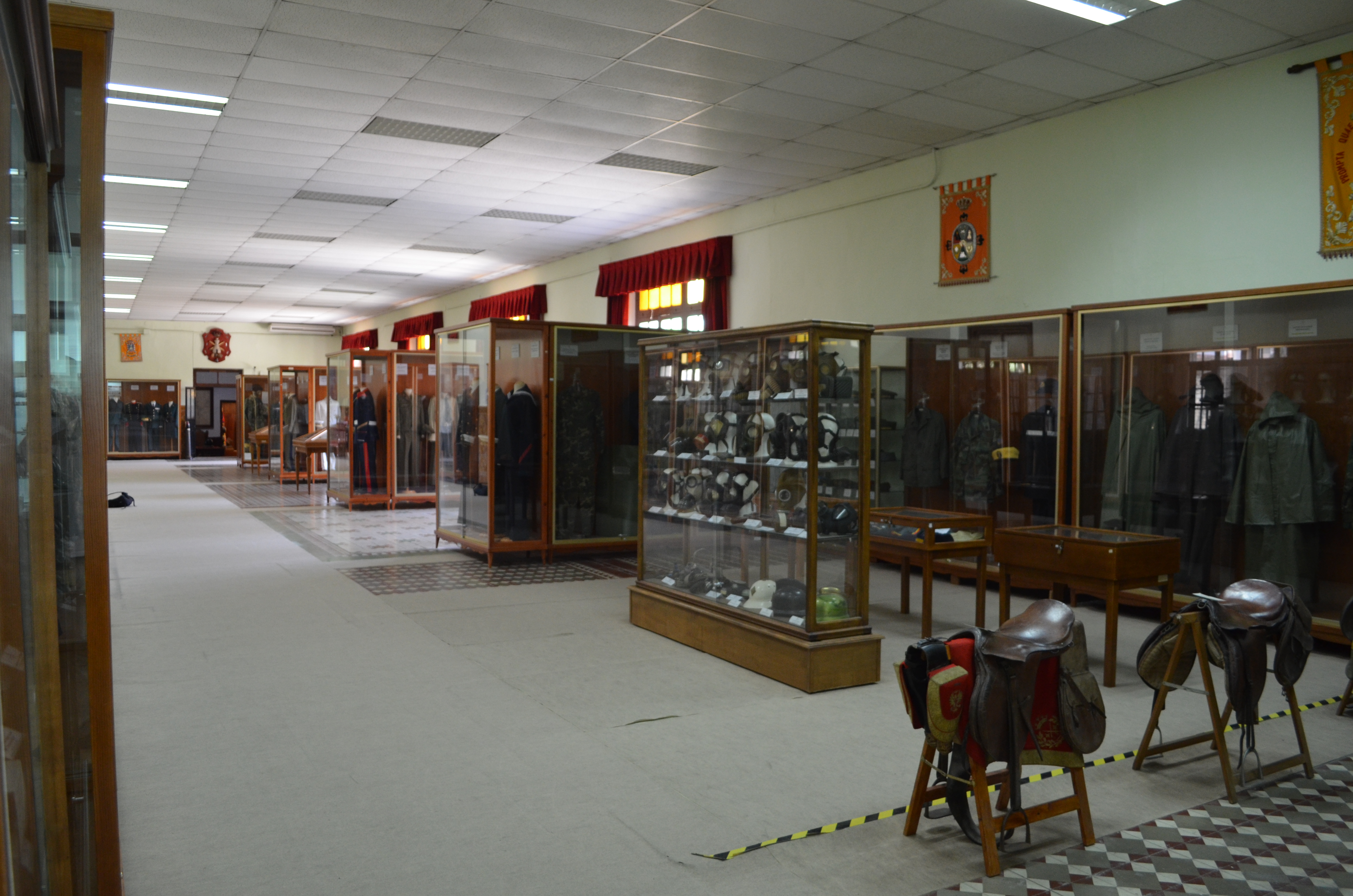

== Association of Friends of the Museum ==
- It begins in year 1996, in the old Artillery Park of Cartagena. In the year 2002 a gun of assault Stug III model G arrives to the Museum where with the support of several British citizens proceeded to its total restoration, having in the Museum several pieces and vehicles restored by the Association. At present, people of various nationalities contribute their work and backing to their support, as well as anonymous citizens with their donations.

== Record of the Museum ==
- Spain's largest artillery collection of the 20th century
- Largest ammunition collection in Spain
- Guinness to the world's largest miniature collection
