= Jason Bateman filmography =

Filmography of Jason Bateman

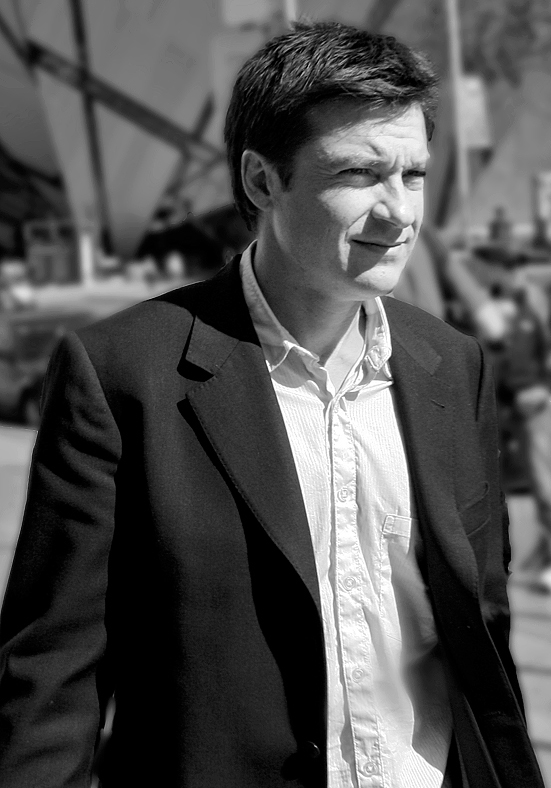
Bateman at the 2007 Toronto International Film Festival

Jason Bateman is an American actor, comedian, director and producer. The following are his roles in film, television and video games.

== Film ==
Year	Title	Role	Notes
1987	Teen Wolf Too	Todd Howard	
1991	Necessary Roughness	Jarvis Edison	
1992	Breaking the Rules	Phil Stepler	
1999	Love Stinks	Jesse Travis	
2001	Sol Goode	Spider	
2002	The Sweetest Thing	Roger Donahue	
2004	Starsky & Hutch	Kevin Jutsum	
2004	Dodgeball: A True Underdog Story	Pepper Brooks	
2006	The Break-Up	Mark Riggleman	
2006	Arthur and the Invisibles	Darkos	Voice, American dub
2006	The Ex	Chip Sanders	
2006	Smokin' Aces	Rupert "Rip" Reed	
2007	The Kingdom	Adam Leavitt	
2007	Juno	Mark Loring	
2007	Mr. Magorium's Wonder Emporium	Henry Weston	
2008	The Promotion	Camp Instructor	
2008	Forgetting Sarah Marshall	Animal Instincts detective	Cameo
2008	Hancock	Ray Embrey	
2008	Tropic Thunder	Himself	Cameo
2009	State of Play	Dominic Foy	
2009	The Invention of Lying	Doctor	Cameo
2009	Up in the Air	Craig Gregory	
2009	Extract	Joel Reynolds	
2009	Couples Retreat	Jason Smith	
2010	The Switch	Wally Mars	
2011	Paul	Agent Lorenzo Zoil	
2011	Horrible Bosses	Nick Hendricks	
2011	The Change-Up	Dave Lockwood / Mitch Planko	
2012	Hit and Run	Officer Keith Yert	
2012	Mansome	Himself	Documentary/executive producer
2012	Disconnect	Rich Boyd	
2013	Identity Thief	Sandy Bigelow Patterson	Also producer
2013	Bad Words	Guy Trilby	Also producer/director
2014	Pump	Narrator	
2014	The Longest Week	Conrad Valmont	
2014	This Is Where I Leave You	Judd Altman	
2014	Horrible Bosses 2	Nick Hendricks	
2015	A Lego Brickumentary	Narrator	Voice
2015	The Gift	Simon Callem	
2015	The Family Fang	Baxter Fang	Also producer/director
2016	Zootopia	Nick Wilde	Voice
2016	Central Intelligence	Trevor Olson	
2016	Office Christmas Party	Josh Parker	
2018	Game Night	Max Davis	Also producer
2021	Thunder Force	Jerry "The Crab"	
2023	LEGO Friends: The Next Chapter: New Beginnings & Other Stories	Olly	Voice
2023	Air	Rob Strasser	
2023	Fool's Paradise	SPFX Tech	
2023	Once Upon a Studio	Nick Wilde	Voice, short film
2024	Carry-On	Traveler	
2025	Zootopia 2	Nick Wilde	Voice
TBA	Superfans: Screaming. Crying. Throwing Up. †	—N/a	Producer, documentary
TBA	The Cackling of the Dodos †	—N/a	Post-production, producer/director
TBA	Preppy †	—N/a	Filming, producer

Key
†	Denotes films that have not yet been released

== Television ==
Year	Title	Role	Notes
1981–1982	Little House on the Prairie	James Cooper Ingalls	21 episodes
1982–1984	Silver Spoons	Derek Taylor	21 episodes
1984	The Fantastic World of D.C. Collins	Addison Cromwell	Television film
1984	Knight Rider	Doug Wainwright	Episode: "Lost Knight"
1984–1985	It's Your Move	Matthew Burton	18 episodes
1985	Robert Kennedy and His Times	Joseph P. Kennedy Jr.	3 episodes
1986	Mr. Belvedere	Sean	Episode: "Rivals"
1986	St. Elsewhere	Tim Moynihan	Episode: "You Beta Your Life"
1986	The Wonderful World of Disney	Steve Tilby	Episode: "The Thanksgiving Promise"
1986–1991	The Hogan Family	David Hogan	Originally titled Valerie and later Valerie's Family 110 episodes, also director
1987	Bates Motel	Tony Scotti	Television film
1988	Moving Target	Toby Kellogg	Television film
1988	Our House	Brian Gill	Episode: "The Fifth Beatle"
1988	Crossing the Mob	Philly	Television film
1992	A Taste for Killing	Blaine Stockard III	Television film
1994	Confessions: Two Faces of Evil	Bill Motorshed	Television film
1994	This Can't Be Love	Grant	Television film
1994	Black Sheep	Jonathan Kelley	Pilot
1995	Burke's Law	Jason Ripley	Episode: "Who Killed the Movie Mogul?"
1995	Hart to Hart: Secrets of the Hart	Stuart Morris	Television film
1995–1996	Simon	Carl Himple	21 episodes
1996	Ned & Stacey	Bobby Van Lowe	Episode: "Pals"
1997	Chicago Sons	Harry Kuichak	13 episodes
1997–1998	George and Leo	Ted Stoody	22 episodes
2000	Rude Awakening	Ryan	Episode: "Star 80 Proof"
2001	Some of My Best Friends	Warren Fairbanks	8 episodes
2002	The Jake Effect	Jake Galvin	7 episodes
2003	The Twilight Zone	Scott Crane	Episode: "Burned"
2003–2006, 2013–2019	Arrested Development	Michael Bluth	84 episodes, directed "Afternoon Delight"
2005, 2020	The Simpsons	Himself / Max Davis	Voice, 2 episodes
2005	King of the Hill	Dr. Leslie	Voice, episode: "The Petriot Act"
2005	Justice League Unlimited	Hermes	Voice, episode: "The Balance"
2005	The Fairly OddParents	Tommy	Voice, episode: "Oh, Brother!"
2005, 2020	Saturday Night Live	Himself (host)	2 episodes
2006	Scrubs	Mr. Sutton	Episode: "My Big Bird"
2008	Do Not Disturb	—N/a	Director of episodes: "Pilot" and "Work Sex"
2009	Sit Down, Shut Up	Larry Littlejunk	Voice, 13 episodes
2013	Yo Gabba Gabba!	Bateman	Episode: "Super Spies"
2014	Growing Up Fisher	Narrator	Voice, 13 episodes, also executive producer
2015	The Muppets	Himself	Episode: "Pig's in a Blackout"
2017	Nobodies	Himself	Episode: "Mr. First Lady"
2017–2022	Ozark	Martin "Marty" Byrde	44 episodes, also director and executive producer
2018–2020	Kidding	—N/a	Executive producer
2020	The Outsider	Terry Maitland	4 episodes, also director and executive producer
2020	A Teacher	—N/a	Miniseries, executive producer
2022	Under the Banner of Heaven	—N/a	Miniseries, executive producer
2022	Zootopia+	Nick Wilde	Voice, episode: "Dinner Rush" (archival audio)
2022	Murderville	Himself	Episode: "Who Killed Santa? A Murderville Murder Mystery"
2023	Florida Man	—N/a	Miniseries, executive producer
2023	Lessons in Chemistry	—N/a	Miniseries, executive producer
2023–2024	Based on a True Story	—N/a	Executive producer
2025	Black Rabbit	Vince Friedken	Miniseries, also director and executive producer
2026	DTF St. Louis	Clark Forrest	Miniseries, also executive producer

Key
†	Denotes television productions that have not yet been released

== Video games ==
Year	Title	Role	Notes	Ref.
2015	Disney Infinity 3.0	Nick Wilde	Voice	

== Music videos ==
Year	Title	Artist	Instrument
2013	"Hopeless Wanderer"	Mumford & Sons	Banjo
