= List of awards and nominations received by Jason Bateman =

Jason Bateman awards and nominations
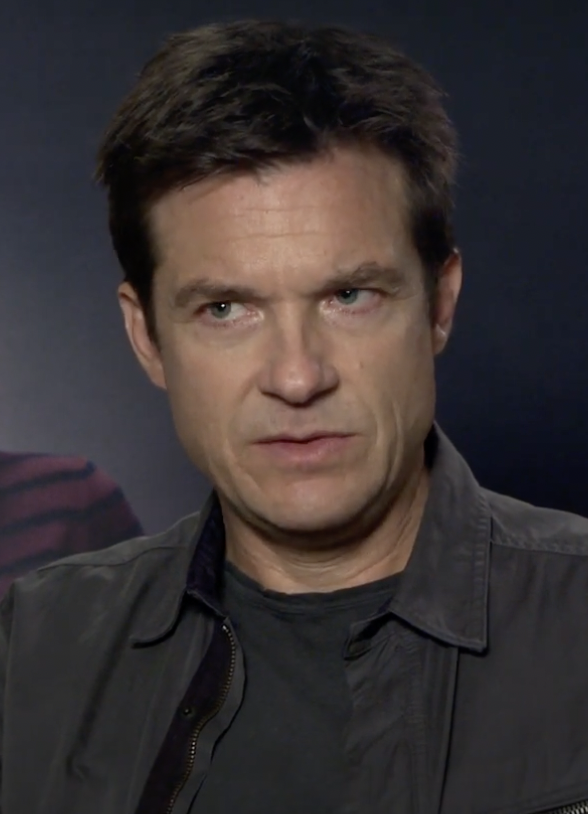
- Bateman in 2018
Awards and nominations
| Award | Wins | Nominations |
| Directors Guild Awards | 0 | 1 |
| Emmy Awards | 2 | 18 |
| Golden Globe Awards | 1 | 6 |
| Screen Actors Guild Awards | 3 | 10 |

Totals (Note: Certain award groups do not simply award one winner. They acknowledge several different recipients, have runners-up, and have third place. Since this is a specific recognition and is different from losing an award, runner-up mentions are considered wins in this award tally. For simplification and to avoid errors, each award in this list has been presumed to have had a prior nomination.)
- Wins: 6
- Nominations: 18

This article is a List of awards and nominations received by Jason Bateman.

Jason Bateman is an American actor, comedian, director, and producer. Over his career he has received a Primetime Emmy Award, a Golden Globe Award, and three Screen Actors Guild Award as well as nominations for a Directors Guild of America Award.

Bateman gained stardom for his portrayal of Michael Bluth in the Fox sitcom Arrested Development for which he was nominated for two Primetime Emmy Awards for Outstanding Lead Actor in a Comedy Series, two Golden Globe Awards for Best Actor – Television Series Musical or Comedy and two Screen Actors Guild Awards for Outstanding Performance by a Male Actor in a Comedy Series

He won the Primetime Emmy Award for Outstanding Directing for a Drama Series for directing the episode "Reparations" for the Netflix drama series Ozark in 2019. He was also nominated for the Directors Guild of America Award for Outstanding Directing – Drama Series. For his performance in the series he received nominations for four Primetime Emmy Award for Outstanding Lead Actor in a Drama Series, three Golden Globe Awards for Best Actor – Television Series Drama, and four Screen Actors Guild Award for Outstanding Performance by a Male Actor in a Comedy Series.

Bateman acted in the Netflix crime thriller series Black Rabbit (2025) for which he was nominated for the Primetime Emmy Award for Outstanding Lead Actor in a Limited Series or Movie and the Actor Award for Outstanding Actor in a Miniseries or Television Movie. He also served as a director earning nominations for the Primetime Emmy Award and the Directors Guild Award for Outstanding Directing for a Limited Series. The following year, Bateman starred in the HBO black comedy miniseries DTF St. Louis (2026) for which he was nominated for the Primetime Emmy Award for Outstanding Supporting Actor in a Limited Series or Movie.

== Major associations ==
=== Actor Awards ===
| Year | Category | Nominated work | Result | Ref. |
|---|---|---|---|---|
| 2005 | Outstanding Male Actor in a Comedy Series | Arrested Development | Nominated | |
| 2005 | Outstanding Ensemble in a Comedy Series | Arrested Development | Nominated | |
| 2006 | Outstanding Ensemble in a Comedy Series | Arrested Development | Nominated | |
| 2014 | Outstanding Ensemble in a Comedy Series | Arrested Development | Nominated | |
| 2014 | Outstanding Male Actor in a Comedy Series | Arrested Development | Nominated | |
| 2018 | Outstanding Male Actor in a Drama Series | Ozark | Nominated | |
| 2019 | Outstanding Male Actor in a Drama Series | Ozark | Won | |
| 2019 | Outstanding Ensemble in a Drama Series | Ozark | Nominated | |
| 2021 | Outstanding Male Actor in a Drama Series | Ozark | Won | |
| 2021 | Outstanding Ensemble in a Drama Series | Ozark | Nominated | |
| 2023 | Outstanding Male Actor in a Drama Series | Ozark | Won | |
| 2023 | Outstanding Ensemble in a Drama Series | Ozark | Nominated | |
| 2026 | Outstanding Actor in a Miniseries or Television Movie | Black Rabbit | Nominated | |

=== Directors Guild Awards ===
| Year | Category | Nominated work | Result | Ref. |
|---|---|---|---|---|
| 2018 | Outstanding Directional Achievement in Dramatic Series | Ozark (episode: "Reparations") | Nominated | |

=== Emmy Awards ===
| Year | Category | Nominated work | Result | Ref. |
Primetime Emmy Awards
| 2005 | Outstanding Lead Actor in a Comedy Series | Arrested Development (episode: "Good Grief") | Nominated | |
| 2013 | Outstanding Lead Actor in a Comedy Series | Arrested Development (episode: "Flight of the Phoenix") | Nominated | |
| 2018 | Outstanding Lead Actor in a Drama Series | Ozark (episode: "The Toll") | Nominated | |
| 2018 | Outstanding Directing for a Drama Series | Ozark (episode: "The Toll") | Nominated | |
| 2019 | Outstanding Drama Series (as Executive Producer) | Ozark (season 2) | Nominated | |
| 2019 | Outstanding Lead Actor in a Drama Series | Ozark (episode: "Reparations") | Nominated | |
| 2019 | Outstanding Directing for a Drama Series | Ozark (episode: "Reparations") | Won | |
| 2020 | Outstanding Drama Series (as Executive Producer) | Ozark (season 3) | Nominated | |
| 2020 | Outstanding Lead Actor in a Drama Series | Ozark (episode: "Su Casa Es Mi Casa") | Nominated | |
| 2020 | Outstanding Guest Actor in a Drama Series | The Outsider (episode: "Fish in a Barrel") | Nominated | |
| 2022 | Outstanding Drama Series (as Executive Producer) | Ozark (season 4) | Nominated | |
| 2022 | Outstanding Lead Actor in a Drama Series | Ozark (episode: "Pound of Flesh and Still Kickin’") | Nominated | |
| 2022 | Outstanding Directing for a Drama Series | Ozark (episode: "A Hard Way to Go") | Nominated | |
| 2024 | Outstanding Limited or Anthology Series | Lessons in Chemistry | Nominated | |
| 2026 | Outstanding Limited or Anthology Series (as a Executive Producer) | DTF St. Louis | Won | |
| 2026 | Outstanding Supporting Actor in a Limited Series or Movie | DTF St. Louis | Nominated | |
| 2026 | Outstanding Lead Actor in a Limited Series or Movie | Black Rabbit | Nominated | |
| 2026 | Outstanding Directing for a Limited Series or Movie | Black Rabbit | Nominated | |

=== Golden Globe Awards ===
| Year | Category | Nominated work | Result | Ref. |
|---|---|---|---|---|
| 2005 | Best Actor in a Television Series – Musical or Comedy | Arrested Development | Won | |
| 2014 | Best Actor in a Television Series – Musical or Comedy | Arrested Development | Nominated | |
| 2018 | Best Actor in a Television Series – Drama | Ozark | Nominated | |
| 2019 | Best Actor in a Television Series – Drama | Ozark | Nominated | |
| 2021 | Best Actor in a Television Series – Drama | Ozark | Nominated | |
| 2026 | Best Podcast | SmartLess | Nominated | |

== Miscellaneous awards ==
| Organizations | Year | Category | Work | Result | Ref. |
|---|---|---|---|---|---|
| AACTA International Awards | 2021 | Best Actor in a Series | Ozark | Nominated | |
| Annie Awards | 2017 | Outstanding Voice Acting in an Animated Feature | Zootopia | Won | |
| Critics' Choice Television Awards | 2021 | Best Actor in a Drama Series | Ozark | Nominated | |
| Independent Spirit Awards | 2021 | Best New Scripted Series | A Teacher | Nominated | |
| Kids' Choice Awards | 2017 | Favorite Frenemies (shared with Ginnifer Goodwin) | Zootopia | Won | |
| Kids' Choice Awards | 2026 | Favorite Male Animated Voice from a Movie | Zootopia 2 | Nominated | |
| Kids' Choice Awards | 2026 | Favorite On-Screen Duo/Trio (shared with Ginnifer Goodwin) | Zootopia 2 | Won | |
| Satellite Awards | 2005 | Best Actor in a Musical or Comedy | Arrested Development | Won | |
| Satellite Awards | 2018 | Best Actor in a Drama / Genre Series | Ozark | Nominated | |
| Satellite Awards | 2020 | Best Actor in a Drama / Genre Series | Ozark | Nominated | |
| TCA Awards | 2004 | Individual Achievement in Comedy | Arrested Development | Nominated | |
| TCA Awards | 2005 | Individual Achievement in Comedy | Arrested Development | Nominated | |
| Teen Choice Awards | 2013 | Choice Movie Actor – Comedy | Identity Thief | Nominated | |
| People's Choice Awards | 2017 | Favorite Animated Movie Voice | Zootopia | Nominated | |
| Young Artist Awards | 1983 | Best Young Actor in a New Television Series | Silver Spoons | Nominated | |
| Young Artist Awards | 1984 | Best Young Actor in a Comedy Series | Silver Spoons | Nominated | |
| Young Artist Awards | 1985 | Best Young Actor in a Television Comedy Series | It's Your Move | Nominated | |
| Young Artist Awards | 1988 | Best Young Male Superstar in Television | Valerie | Nominated | |

== Honorary awards ==
| Organizations | Year | Award | Result | Ref. |
|---|---|---|---|---|
| Hollywood Walk of Fame | 2017 | Motion Pictures | Inducted | |
| Hasty Pudding Theatricals | 2022 | Hasty Pudding Man of the Year | Inducted | |
