= Emily Fox (disambiguation) =

Emily Fox (born 1998) is an American soccer player.

Emily Fox may also refer to:

- Emily Fox (basketball) (born 1987), American basketball player and former world record holder at sport stacking
- Emily B. Fox, American statistician
- Emily Jane Fox (born c. 1988), American reporter
- Emily Fox (producer), creator of the TV series Hindsight
