= Joy Sunday =

Nigerian American actress

- Born: September 25, 1996 (age 30); Staten Island, New York, US
- Education: University of Southern California (BA)
- Occupation: Actress
- Years active: 2014–present

Joy Sunday (born September 25, 1996) is a Nigerian-American actress. She has performed in television, notably in Wednesday and Dear White People. In film, she is known for side roles in Bad Hair, Shithouse, and Dog. As of its March 2026 premiere, she starred in the HBO limited series DTF St. Louis, for which she received a Primetime Emmynomination for Outstanding Supporting Actress in a Limited or Anthology Series or Movie.

== Early life and education ==
Sunday was born in Staten Island, New York, to Nigerian parents. Her mother worked as a nurse’s assistant and her father was a social worker.

Sunday is a graduate of Fiorello H. LaGuardia High School in New York City, where she studied theatre. Sunday states that her time at LaGuardia was difficult, as "conservatories aren't always kind to Black and Brown actors [or] to poor actors." She chose to pursue filmmaking instead and enrolled at the University of Southern California in Los Angeles. There she studied at the USC School of Cinematic Arts and earned a degree in critical studies.

Outside of academia, she worked as a filmmaker with Tribeca Film Institute on the side, working on several shorts.

== Career ==
Sunday made her television debut in an episode of MacGyver in 2018, where she appeared in one episode. She joined the Screen Actors Guild in 2020 with her performance in Bad Hair. She had a side role as Sophia in Cooper Raiff's 2020 directorial debut film Shithouse. She had an appearance in one episode of the Netflix series Dear White People. Sunday followed that up with side roles in the film The Beta Test and Dog.

Her breakout role came in 2022 in the Netflix series Wednesday, produced by Tim Burton. She portrays siren Bianca Barclay, the rival to the titular character, Wednesday Addams. She stars alongside Jenna Ortega, Emma Myers, Hunter Doohan, Catherine Zeta-Jones, Luis Guzmán, and Gwendoline Christie. The show opened to rave reviews and became the most viewed English language series on Netflix.

In 2024, Sunday became a global ambassador for the cosmetics house Lancôme. In 2025, she joined the HBO limited dark comedy series DTF St. Louis, alongside Jason Bateman, David Harbour, Linda Cardellini, Richard Jenkins, and Chris Perfetti.

== Personal life ==
Sunday credits Nigerian actors Genevieve Nnaji and Nkem Owoh as her childhood inspiration in the film industry.

== Filmography ==
=== Film ===
Year	Title	Role	Notes
2014	Beautiful Hair	—N/a	Short film Director and writer
2015	Embody	Sasha	Short film
2017	Darling	Unnamed role	Short film Also director and writer
2018	Joy	Joy	Short film Also featured in Her Mind in Pieces anthology film
2018	Alive, Again	Sage	Short film
2019	Callback	Sarah	Short film
2019	Her Mind in Pieces	Joy	Anthology film Segment: Joy
2020	Bad Hair	Cynthia	
2020	Shithouse	Sophia	
2020	Take My Heart	Mac	Short film
2020	Limelight	Didienne	Short film
2021	The Beta Test	Celia	
2022	Dog	Dr. Gray	
2023	Rise	Rayowa	
2024	Under the Influencer	Rachel	

=== Television ===
Year	Title	Role	Notes
2018	MacGyver	Abina	Episode: "Scavengers + Hard Drive + Dragonfly"
2018	Yas Kween	Ria	5 episodes
2019	Carol's Second Act	Macy	Episode: "Therapy Dogs"
2019	Good Trouble	Janella	Episode: "A Very Coterie Christmas"
2021	Dear White People	Claire	Episode: "Volume 4: Chapter VII"
2022–present	Wednesday	Bianca Barclay	15 episodes
2026	DTF St. Louis	Jodie Plumb	7 episodes

== Awards and nominations ==
Award	Year	Category	Nominated work	Result	Ref.
Primetime Emmy Awards	2026	Outstanding Supporting Actress in a Limited or Anthology Series or Movie	DTF St. Louis	Nominated	
