= Zach Baylin =

American screenwriter

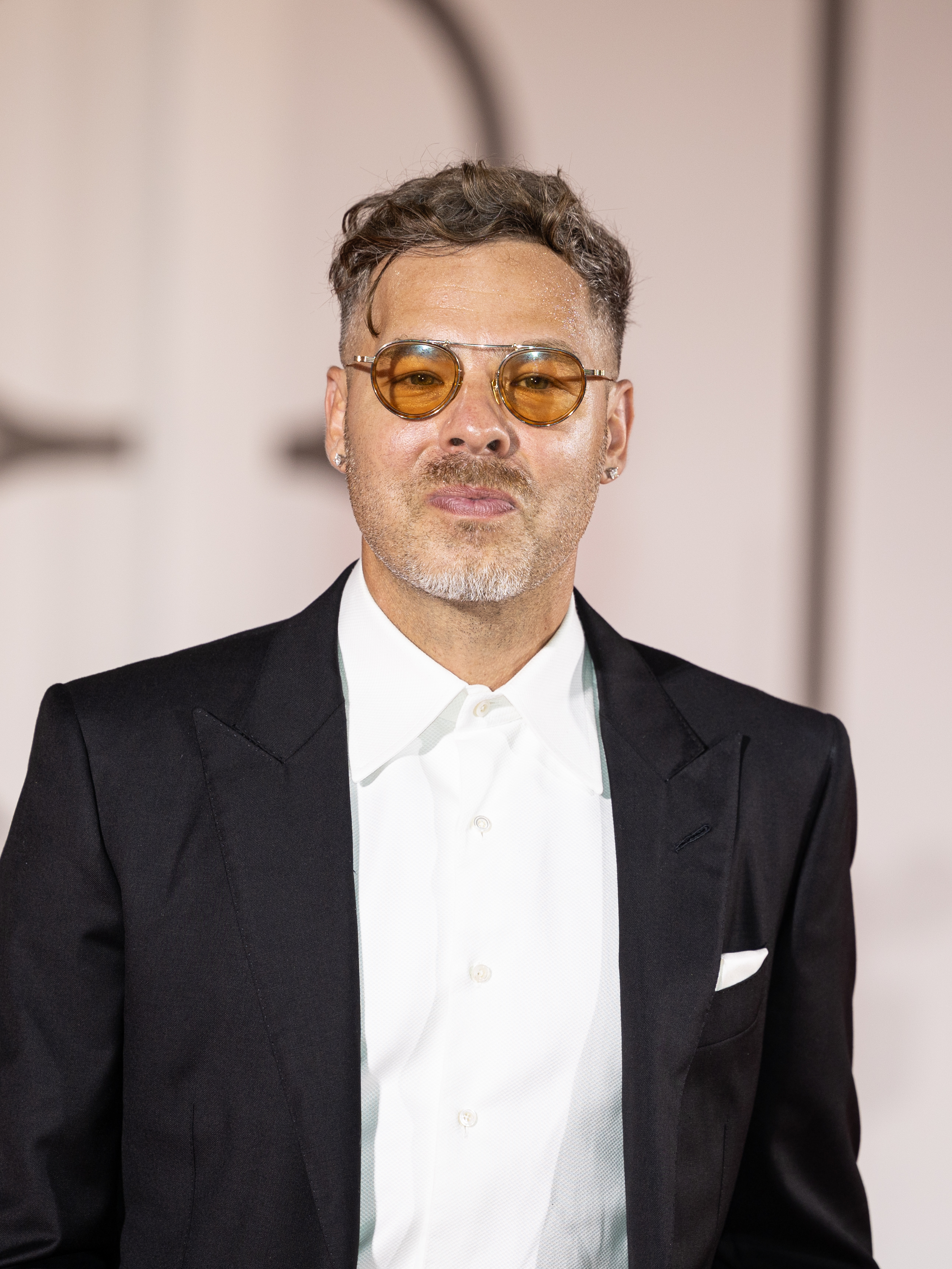
- Baylin in 2024
- Born: Zachary Jones Baylin
- Occupation: Screenwriter
- Years active: 2005–present
- Spouse: Kate Susman (m. 2010)
- Children: 2

Zachary Jones Baylin is an American screenwriter. He made his screenwriting debut with King Richard (2021), which was nominated for the Academy Award for Best Original Screenplay. He also wrote the screenplays for the films Creed III (2023), Gran Turismo (2023), Bob Marley: One Love (2024) and The Order (2024), and co-created the Netflix crime miniseries Black Rabbit (2025).

== Early life ==
Baylin is a native of Wilmington, Delaware. He attended the Tatnall School and graduated from Johns Hopkins University in 2002, where he was a two-time Academic All-America receiver on the football team.

== Career ==
After graduating, Baylin moved to New York City, where he worked as a production assistant and set dresser for films and television including Dave Chappelle's Block Party, Jack Goes Boating, Top Five, Boardwalk Empire, and Gossip Girl.

He wrote the screenplay to King Richard, which was listed on the 2018 Black List, the entertainment industry's annual report of best unproduced screenplays. The film earned him a nomination for the Academy Award for Best Original Screenplay.

Baylin co-wrote Creed III with Keenan Coogler, set for a wide release on March 3, 2023. In April 2022, he was announced as the writer of a new film based on The Crow, starring Bill Skarsgård, which released in 2024. The same year, Baylin wrote the script for Justin Kurzel's crime thriller film The Order, starring Jude Law, and co-wrote the biopic Bob Marley: One Love, directed by King Richard director Reinaldo Marcus Green.

In 2025, Baylin and his wife Kate Susman co-created the Netflix crime miniseries Black Rabbit, also starring Law alongside Jason Bateman, and Kurzel directing the final two episodes. In 2025, it was reported that Baylin had written an untitled UFO-whistleblower film to be directed by Joseph Kosinski for Apple TV+.

In February 2026, it was announced that Baylin would write a biopic about Lance Armstrong, which will star Austin Butler and be directed by Edward Berger.

== Personal life ==
Baylin is married to screenwriter Kate Susman, with whom he has two children. The two co-created Black Rabbit.

== Filmography ==
Film writer

Year	Title	Director
2021	King Richard	Reinaldo Marcus Green
2023	Creed III	Michael B. Jordan
2023	Gran Turismo	Neill Blomkamp
2024	Bob Marley: One Love	Reinaldo Marcus Green
2024	The Crow	Rupert Sanders
2024	The Order	Justin Kurzel

Television

Year	Title	Writer	Creator	Executive producer	Note
2025	Black Rabbit	Yes	Yes	Yes	Wrote 4 episodes

== Awards and nominations ==
Year	Award	Category	Title	Result
2022	Academy Awards	Best Original Screenplay	King Richard	Nominated
2022	British Academy Film Awards	Best Original Screenplay	King Richard	Nominated
2022	Critics' Choice Awards	Best Original Screenplay	King Richard	Nominated
2026	Producers Guild of America Awards	Best Limited Series Television	Black Rabbit	Nominated
2022	Satellite Awards	Best Original Screenplay	King Richard	Nominated
2022	Writers Guild of America Awards	Best Original Screenplay	King Richard	Nominated
2026	Writers Guild of America Awards	Limited Series	Black Rabbit	Nominated
