= List of awards and nominations received by Richard Jenkins =

Richard Jenkins awards and nominations
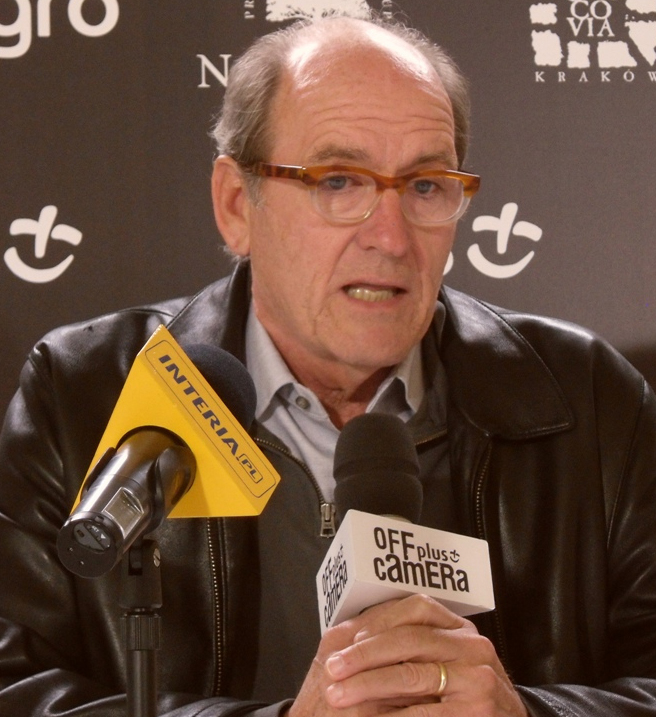
- Jenkins in 2011
Awards and nominations
Award	Wins	Nominations
Academy Awards	0	2
Actor Awards	0	4
Critics' Choice Awards	0	3
Emmy Award	1	4
Golden Globes	0	2

Totals (Note: Certain award groups do not simply award one winner. They acknowledge several different recipients, have runners-up, and have third place. Since this is a specific recognition and is different from losing an award, runner-up mentions are considered wins in this award tally. For simplification and to avoid errors, each award in this list has been presumed to have had a prior nomination.)
- Wins: 12
- Nominations: 57

Richard Jenkins is an American character actor known for his roles in film and television. He has received various accolades including a Primetime Emmy Award as well as nominations for two Academy Awards, two Actor Awards, three Critics' Choice Awards, and two Golden Globe Awards.

Jenkins acted in the David O. Russell black comedy Flirting with Disaster (1996) for which he was nominated for the Independent Spirit Award for Best Supporting Male. For his role as man in a midlife crisis in the independent drama The Visitor (2008) he earned widespread acclaim as well as nominations for the Academy Award for Best Actor, the Critics' Choice Movie Award for Best Actor, the Independent Spirit Award for Best Male Lead and the Actor Award for Outstanding Performance by a Male Actor in a Leading Role. He further broke out that year with roles in the comedy Step Brothers, the Coen brothers black comedy Burn After Reading, and the animated film The Tale of Despereaux.

He portrayed a Deputy in the Western drama Bone Tomahawk (2015) for which he was nominated for the Independent Spirit Award for Best Supporting Male. For his role as a lonely illustrator in Guillermo del Toro's romance fantasy The Shape of Water (2017) he was nominated for the Academy Award for Best Supporting Actor, the Critics' Choice Movie Award for Best Supporting Actor, the Golden Globe Award for Best Supporting Actor – Motion Picture and the Actor Award for Outstanding Performance by a Male Actor in a Supporting Role. He acted in del Toro's noir thriller Nightmare Alley (2021) for which he was nominated for the Saturn Award for Best Supporting Actor.

On television, he played Nathaniel Fisher Sr. in the HBO drama series Six Feet Under (2001–2005) for which he was nominated for the Actor Award for Outstanding Ensemble in a Drama Series. He played a loving husband and pharmacist in the HBO limited series Olive Kitteridge (2014) for which he won the Primetime Emmy Award for Outstanding Lead Actor in a Limited or Anthology Series or Movie. He was nominated for two Primetime Emmy Awards for Outstanding Supporting Actor in a Limited or Anthology Series or Movie for his portrayals of Lionel Dahmer in the Netflix anthology series Monster: The Jeffrey Dahmer Story (2022) and a county detective in the HBO black comedy miniseries DTF St. Louis (2026).

== Major associations ==
=== Academy Awards ===
Year	Category	Nominated work	Result	Ref.
2008	Best Actor	The Visitor	Nominated	
2017	Best Supporting Actor	The Shape of Water	Nominated	

=== Actor Awards ===
Year	Category	Nominated work	Result	Ref.
2001	Outstanding Ensemble in a Drama Series	Six Feet Under	Nominated	
2008	Outstanding Actor in a Leading Role	The Visitor	Nominated	
2014	Outstanding Actor in a Miniseries or TV Movie	Olive Kitteridge	Nominated	
2017	Outstanding Actor in a Supporting Role	The Shape of Water	Nominated	

=== Critics' Choice Awards ===
Year	Category	Nominated work	Result	Ref.
Critics' Choice Movie Awards
2008	Best Actor	The Visitor	Nominated	
2017	Best Supporting Actor	The Shape of Water	Nominated	
Critics' Choice Television Award
2015	Best Actor in a Movie/Miniseries	Olive Kitteridge	Nominated	

=== Emmy Awards ===
Year	Category	Nominated work	Result	Ref.
2015	Outstanding Lead Actor in a Miniseries or Movie	Olive Kitteridge	Won	
2022	Outstanding Limited or Anthology Series (as a producer)	Monster: The Jeffrey Dahmer Story	Nominated	
2022	Outstanding Supporting Actor in a Limited Series or Movie	Monster: The Jeffrey Dahmer Story	Nominated	
2026	Outstanding Supporting Actor in a Limited Series or Movie	DTF St. Louis	Nominated	

=== Golden Globe Awards ===
Year	Category	Nominated work	Result	Ref.
2017	Best Supporting Actor – Motion Picture	The Shape of Water	Nominated	
2022	Best Supporting Actor – Television	Monster: The Jeffrey Dahmer Story	Nominated	

== Miscellaneous awards ==
Year	Organizations	Category	Work	Result	Ref.
1996	Independent Spirit Award	Best Supporting Male	Flirting with Disaster	Nominated	
2008	Boston Society of Film Critics	Best Actor	The Visitor	3rd place	
2008	Boston Society of Film Critics	Best Cast	The Visitor	2nd place	
2008	Chicago Film Critics Association	Best Actor	The Visitor	Nominated	
2008	Dallas-Fort Worth Film Critics Association	Best Actor	The Visitor	Nominated	
2008	Gotham Awards	Best Ensemble Cast	The Visitor	Nominated	
2008	Independent Spirit Awards	Best Male Lead	The Visitor	Nominated	
2008	Method Fest Independent Film Festival	Best Actor	The Visitor	Won	
2008	Moscow International Film Festival	Best Actor	The Visitor	Won	
2008	National Board of Review	Spotlight Award	The Visitor	Won	
2008	Online Film Critics Society	Best Actor	The Visitor	Nominated	
2008	San Diego Film Critics Society	Special Award	The Visitor	Won	
2008	Santa Barbara International Film Festival	Virtuoso Award	The Visitor	Won	
2008	Satellite Award	Best Actor – Motion Picture	The Visitor	Won	
2008	San Diego Film Critics Society	Special Award	Step Brothers / Burn After Reading / The Tale of Despereaux	Won	
2010	Breckenridge Festival of Film	Best Ensemble Cast	Norman	Won	
2010	Fangoria Chainsaw Awards	Best Supporting Actor	Let Me In	Won	
2014	Satellite Award	Best Actor – Miniseries or Television Film	Olive Kitteridge	Nominated	
2015	Independent Spirit Awards	Best Supporting Male	Bone Tomahawk	Nominated	
2017	Austin Film Critics Association	Best Supporting Actor	The Shape of Water	Nominated	
2017	Dallas-Fort Worth Film Critics Association	Best Actor	The Shape of Water	3rd place	
2017	Detroit Film Critics Society	Best Supporting Actor	The Shape of Water	Nominated	
2017	Houston Film Critics Society	Best Supporting Actor	The Shape of Water	Nominated	
2017	Online Film Critics Society	Best Supporting Actor	The Shape of Water	2nd place	
2017	San Francisco Film Critics Circle	Best Supporting Actor	The Shape of Water	Nominated	
2017	St. Louis Gateway Film Critics Association	Best Supporting Actor	The Shape of Water	Won	
2021	Saturn Award	Best Supporting Actor	Nightmare Alley	Nominated	
2022	Satellite Award	Best Supporting Actor – Television	Monster: The Jeffrey Dahmer Story	Nominated	
