= Writers Guild of America Award for Television: Limited Series =

Annual television award

- Awarded for: Outstanding Writing for a Limited Series
- Country: United States
- Presented by: Writers Guild of America
- First award: 2022
- Currently held by: Dying for Sex (2026)
- Website: www.wga.org

The Writers Guild of America Award for Television: Best Written Limited Series is an award presented by the Writers Guild of America to the writers of the best limited television series of the season. It has been awarded since the 75th Annual Writers Guild of America Awards in 2022. Previously, limited series/miniseries were awarded in two separate categories: Long Form - Adapted and Long Form - Original. During this time, series were grouped with television/streaming films, which now have their own category (TV & New Media Motion Pictures).

The year indicates when each season aired. The winners are highlighted in gold.

== 2020s ==
Year	Program	Writer(s)	Network
2022 (75th)
2022 (75th)	The White Lotus	Mike White	HBO
2022 (75th)	The Dropout	Hilary Bettis, Liz Hannah, Liz Heldens, Dan LeFranc, Sofya Levitsky-Weitz, Matt Lutsky, Elizabeth Meriwether, Wei-Ning Yu	Hulu
2022 (75th)	Fleishman Is in Trouble	Taffy Brodesser-Akner, Cindy Chupack, Allison P. Davis, Mike Goldbach, Boo Killebrew	FX/Hulu
2022 (75th)	Pam & Tommy	Brooke Baker, Matthew Bass, Theodore Bressman, D.V. DeVincentis, Sarah Gubbins, Robert Siegel	Hulu
2022 (75th)	The Staircase	Aisha Bhoori, Antonio Campos, Maggie Cohn, Aja Gabel, Emily Kaczmarek, Craig Shilowich, Sebastian Silva	HBO Max
2023 (76th)
2023 (76th)	Beef	Joanna Calo, Bathsheba Doran, Jean Kyoung Frazier, Niko Gutierrez-Kovner, Lee Sung Jin, Alice Ju, Carrie Kemper, Mike Makowsky, Marie Hanhnhon Nguyen, Kevin Rosen, Alex Russell	Netflix
2023 (76th)	A Murder at the End of the World	Zal Batmanglij, Cherie Dimaline, Brit Marling, Melanie Marnich, Rebecca Roanhorse	FX/Hulu
2023 (76th)	Daisy Jones & the Six	Susan Coyne, Jihan Crowther, Harris Danow, Charmaine DeGraté, Will Graham, Nora Kirkpatrick, Jenny Klein, Liz Koe, Judalina Neira, Scott Neustadter, Stacy Traub, Michael H. Weber	Prime Video
2023 (76th)	Fargo	Thomas Bezucha, Bob DeLaurentis, Noah Hawley, April Shih	FX
2023 (76th)	Lessons in Chemistry	Victoria Bata, Lee Eisenberg, Hannah Fidell, Emily Jane Fox, Susannah Grant, Rosa Handelman, Elissa Karasik, Boo Killebrew, Mfoniso Udofia, Teagan Wall	Apple TV+
2024 (77th)
2024 (77th)	The Penguin	Vladimir Cvetko, Breannah Gibson, Erika L. Johnson, Lauren LeFranc, Corina Maritescu, Megan Martin, John McCutcheon, Shaye Ogbonna, Kira Snyder, Nick Towne, Noelle Valdivia	HBO
2024 (77th)	Presumed Innocent	Miki Johnson, David E. Kelley, Sharr White	Apple TV+
2024 (77th)	Ripley	Steven Zaillian	Netflix
2024 (77th)	Say Nothing	Clare Barron, Joe Murtagh, Kirsten Sheridan, Joshua Zetumer	FX/Hulu
2024 (77th)	True Detective: Night Country	Katrina Albright, Alan Page Arriaga, Namsi Khan, Issa López, Chris Mundy, Wenonah Wilms	HBO
2025 (78th)
2025 (78th)	Dying for Sex	Sheila Callaghan, Harris Danow, Madeleine George, Elizabeth Meriwether, Amelia Roper, Kim Rosenstock, Sasha Stewart, Sabrina Wu, Keisha Zollar	FX/Hulu
2025 (78th)	The Beast in Me	Howard Gordon, C.A. Johnson, Ali Liebegott, Daniel Pearle, Gabe Rotter, Erika Sheffer, Mike Skerrett	Netflix
2025 (78th)	Black Rabbit	Zach Baylin, Sarah Gubbins, Kate Susman, Andrew Hinderaker, Stacy Osei-Kuffour, Carlos Rios	Netflix
2025 (78th)	Death by Lightning	Mike Makowsky	Netflix
2025 (78th)	Sirens	Dan LeFranc, Colin McKenna, Molly Smith Metzler	Netflix

== Total awards by network ==
- HBO – 2 awards
- FX – 1 award
- Hulu – 1 award
- Netflix – 1 award

== Total nominations by network ==
- Hulu – 6 nominations
- Netflix – 6 nominations
- FX – 4 nominations
- HBO/HBO Max – 4 nominations
- Apple TV – 2 nominations
- Prime Video – 1 nomination
