= Primetime Emmy Award for Outstanding Supporting Actress in a Limited or Anthology Series or Movie =

American television award

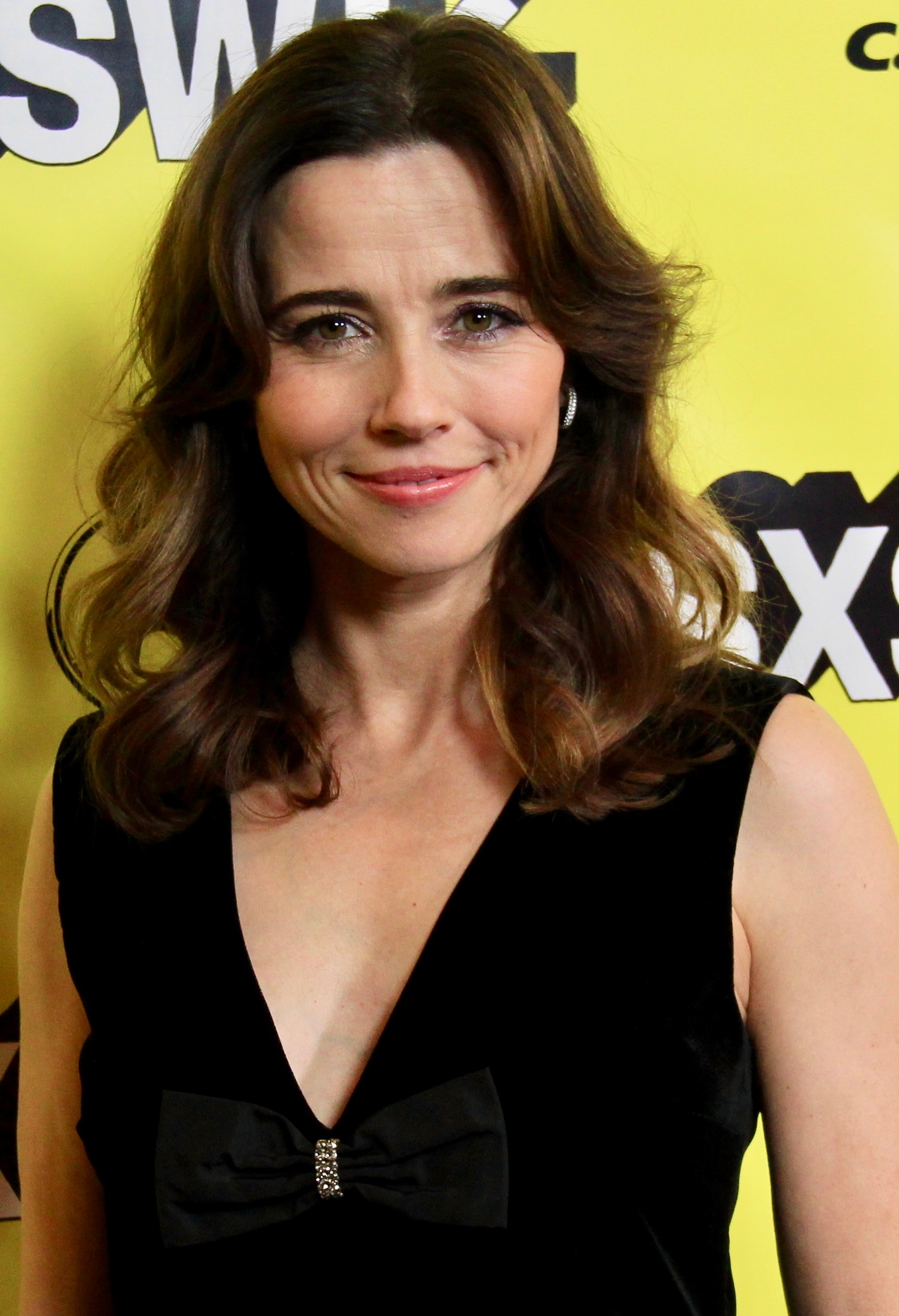
- 2026 recipient: Linda Cardellini
- Awarded for: Outstanding Supporting Actress in a Limited or Anthology Series or Movie
- Country: United States
- Presented by: Academy of Television Arts & Sciences
- First award: 1975
- Currently held by: Linda Cardellini, DTF St. Louis (2026)
- Website: emmys.com

The Primetime Emmy Award for Outstanding Supporting Actress in a Limited or Anthology Series or Movie is an award presented annually by the Academy of Television Arts & Sciences (ATAS). It is given in honor of an actress who has delivered an outstanding performance in a supporting role on a television limited series or television movie for the primetime network season.

The award was first presented at the 27th Primetime Emmy Awards on May 19, 1975, to Juliet Mills, for her role as Samantha Cady in QB VII (1974). The award ceremony garnered criticism during the 58th Primetime Emmy Awards, when Ellen Burstyn received a nomination for her work in Mrs. Harris (2005), despite having only 14 seconds of screen time and 38 words of dialogue. This resulted in a rule change, requiring nominees submitting for the category to have more than 5% screen-time on their respective projects.

Since its inception, the award has been given to 38 actresses. Regina King, Jane Alexander, Judy Davis, Colleen Dewhurst, and Mare Winningham have each won two awards. Kathy Bates is the most nominated actress in the category, with seven nominations.

== Winners and nominations ==
=== 1970s ===
Year	Actress	Role	Program	Network
Outstanding Single Performance by a Supporting Actress in a Comedy or Drama Special
1975 (27th)
1975 (27th)	Juliet Mills	Samantha Cady	QB VII	ABC
1975 (27th)	Eileen Heckart	Herman's Mother	Wedding Band	ABC
1975 (27th)	Charlotte Rae	Helen	Queen of the Stardust Ballroom	ABC
1975 (27th)	Lee Remick	Lady Margaret	QB VII	ABC
1976 (28th)
1976 (28th)	Rosemary Murphy	Sara Delano Roosevelt	Eleanor and Franklin	ABC
1976 (28th)	Lois Nettleton	Nan Claybourne	Fear on Trial	CBS
1976 (28th)	Lilia Skala	Mlle. Souvestre	Eleanor and Franklin	ABC
1976 (28th)	Irene Tedrow	Mary Hall	Eleanor and Franklin	ABC
1977 (29th)
1977 (29th)	Diana Hyland (posthumously)	Mickey Lubitch	The Boy in the Plastic Bubble	ABC
1977 (29th)	Ruth Gordon	Cecilia Weiss	The Great Houdini	ABC
1977 (29th)	Rosemary Murphy	Sara Roosevelt	Eleanor and Franklin: The White House Years	ABC
1977 (29th)	Patricia Neal	Sen. Margaret Chase Smith	Tail Gunner Joe	NBC
1977 (29th)	Susan Oliver	Neta "Snookie" Snook	Amelia Earhart	NBC
1978 (30th)
1978 (30th)	Eva Le Gallienne	Fanny Cavendish	The Royal Family	PBS
1978 (30th)	Tyne Daly	Karen Renshaw	Intimate Strangers	ABC
1978 (30th)	Patty Duke	Wendy	A Family Upside Down	NBC
1978 (30th)	Mariette Hartley	Clare Gardiner	The Last Hurrah	NBC
1978 (30th)	Cloris Leachman	Clara Oddbody	It Happened One Christmas	ABC
1978 (30th)	Viveca Lindfors	Dr. Rosen	A Question of Guilt	CBS
Outstanding Supporting Actress in a Limited Series or Special
1979 (31st)
1979 (31st)	Esther Rolle	Ruth	Summer of My German Soldier	NBC
1979 (31st)	Ruby Dee	Queen Haley	Roots: The Next Generations	ABC
1979 (31st)	Colleen Dewhurst	Mrs. O'Neil	Silent Victory: The Kitty O'Neil Story	CBS
1979 (31st)	Eileen Heckart	Eleanor Roosevelt	Backstairs at the White House	NBC
1979 (31st)	Celeste Holm	Florence Harding	Backstairs at the White House	NBC

=== 1980s ===
Year	Actress	Role	Program	Network
Outstanding Supporting Actress in a Limited Series or Special
1980 (32nd)
1980 (32nd)	Mare Winningham	Marlene Burkhardt	Amber Waves	ABC
1980 (32nd)	Eileen Heckart	Eleanor Roosevelt	F.D.R.: The Last Year	NBC
1980 (32nd)	Patricia Neal	Mrs. Baumer	All Quiet on the Western Front	CBS
1980 (32nd)	Carrie Nye	Tallulah Bankhead	Moviola: The Scarlett O'Hara War	NBC
1981 (33rd)
1981 (33rd)	Jane Alexander	Alma Rose	Playing for Time	CBS
1981 (33rd)	Colleen Dewhurst	Val	The Women's Room	ABC
1981 (33rd)	Patty Duke	Lily	The Women's Room	ABC
1981 (33rd)	Shirley Knight	Frau Lagerfuhrerin Maria Mandel	Playing for Time	CBS
1981 (33rd)	Piper Laurie	Magda Goebbels	The Bunker	CBS
1982 (34th)
1982 (34th)	Penny Fuller	Mrs. Kendal	The Elephant Man	ABC
1982 (34th)	Claire Bloom	Lady Marchmain	Brideshead Revisited	PBS
1982 (34th)	Judy Davis	Young Golda Meir	A Woman Called Golda	Syndicated
1982 (34th)	Vicki Lawrence	Thelma "Mama" Harper	Eunice	CBS
1982 (34th)	Rita Moreno	Rosella DeLeon	Portrait of a Showgirl	CBS
1983 (35th)
1983 (35th)	Jean Simmons	Fee Cleary	The Thorn Birds	ABC
1983 (35th)	Judith Anderson	Nurse	Kennedy Center Tonight: Medea	PBS
1983 (35th)	Polly Bergen	Rhoda Henry	The Winds of War	ABC
1983 (35th)	Bette Davis	Alice Gwynne Vanderbilt	Little Gloria... Happy at Last	NBC
1983 (35th)	Piper Laurie	Anne Mueller	The Thorn Birds	ABC
1984 (36th)
1984 (36th)	Roxana Zal	Amelia Bennett	Something About Amelia	ABC
1984 (36th)	Beverly D'Angelo	Stella DuBois Kowalski	A Streetcar Named Desire	ABC
1984 (36th)	Patty Duke	Martha Washington	George Washington	CBS
1984 (36th)	Cloris Leachman	Mary Kovacs	Ernie Kovacs: Between the Laughter	ABC
1984 (36th)	Tuesday Weld	Margie Young-Hunt	The Winter of Our Discontent	CBS
1985 (37th)
1985 (37th)	Kim Stanley	Big Mama	Cat on a Hot Tin Roof	PBS
1985 (37th)	Penny Fuller	Mae	Cat on a Hot Tin Roof	PBS
1985 (37th)	Ann Jillian	Nellie Byfield	Ellis Island	CBS
1985 (37th)	Deborah Kerr	Emma Harte	A Woman of Substance	OPT
1985 (37th)	Alfre Woodard	Claudie Sills	WonderWorks: Words by Heart	PBS
Outstanding Supporting Actress in a Miniseries or Special
1986 (38th)
1986 (38th)	Colleen Dewhurst	Barbara Petherton	Between Two Women	ABC
1986 (38th)	Phyllis Frelich	Janice Ryder	Love Is Never Silent	NBC
1986 (38th)	Dorothy McGuire	Hester Farrell	Amos	CBS
1986 (38th)	Vanessa Redgrave	Tsarevna Sophia	Peter the Great	NBC
1986 (38th)	Sylvia Sidney	Beatrice McKenna	An Early Frost	NBC
1987 (39th)
1987 (39th)	Piper Laurie	Annie Gilbert	Promise	CBS
1987 (39th)	Claudette Colbert	Alice Grenville	The Two Mrs. Grenvilles	NBC
1987 (39th)	Olivia de Havilland	Dowager Empress Maria	Anastasia: The Mystery of Anna	NBC
1987 (39th)	Christine Lahti	Althea Milford	Amerika	ABC
1987 (39th)	Elizabeth Wilson	Berenice Bradshaw	Nutcracker: Money, Madness and Murder	NBC
1988 (40th)
1988 (40th)	Jane Seymour	Maria Callas	Onassis: The Richest Man in the World	ABC
1988 (40th)	Stockard Channing	Susan Reinert	Echoes in the Darkness	CBS
1988 (40th)	Ruby Dee	Elizabeth Keckley	Lincoln	NBC
1988 (40th)	Julie Harris	Alice	The Woman He Loved	CBS
1988 (40th)	Lisa Jacobs	Anne Frank	The Attic: The Hiding of Anne Frank	CBS
1989 (41st)
1989 (41st)	Colleen Dewhurst	Margaret Page	Those She Left Behind	NBC
1989 (41st)	Peggy Ashcroft	Miss Duber	A Perfect Spy	PBS
1989 (41st)	Polly Bergen	Rhoda Henry	War and Remembrance	ABC
1989 (41st)	Glenne Headly	Elmira Johnson	Lonesome Dove	CBS
1989 (41st)	Paula Kelly	Theresa	The Women of Brewster Place	ABC

=== 1990s ===
Year	Actress	Role	Program	Network
Outstanding Supporting Actress in a Miniseries or Special
1990 (42nd)
1990 (42nd)	Eva Marie Saint	Lil Van Degan Altemus	People Like Us	NBC
1990 (42nd)	Stockard Channing	Liz Sapperstein	Perfect Witness	HBO
1990 (42nd)	Colleen Dewhurst	Hepzibah	Lantern Hill	Disney
1990 (42nd)	Swoosie Kurtz	Joanne Winstow-Darvish	The Image	HBO
1990 (42nd)	Irene Worth	Dolly Keeling	The Shell Seekers	ABC
1991 (43rd)
1991 (43rd)	Ruby Dee	Rowena	Decoration Day	NBC
1991 (43rd)	Olympia Dukakis	Katherine Campbell	Lucky Day	ABC
1991 (43rd)	Vanessa Redgrave	Empress Elizabeth	Young Catherine	TNT
1991 (43rd)	Doris Roberts	Mimi Finklestein	The Sunset Gang	PBS
1991 (43rd)	Elaine Stritch	Rose	An Inconvenient Woman	ABC
1992 (44th)
1992 (44th)	Amanda Plummer	Lusia	Miss Rose White	NBC
1992 (44th)	Anne Bancroft	Kate Jerome	Broadway Bound	ABC
1992 (44th)	Bibi Besch	Lisa Carter	Doing Time on Maple Drive	Fox
1992 (44th)	Penny Fuller	Miss Kate Ryan	Miss Rose White	NBC
1992 (44th)	Maureen Stapleton	Tanta Perla	Miss Rose White	NBC
1993 (45th)
1993 (45th)	Mary Tyler Moore	Georgia Tann	Stolen Babies	Lifetime
1993 (45th)	Ann-Margret	Sally Jackson	Alex Haley's Queen	CBS
1993 (45th)	Lee Grant	Dora Cohn	Citizen Cohn	HBO
1993 (45th)	Peggy McCay	Virginia Bembenek	Woman on the Run: The Lawrencia Bembenek Story	NBC
1993 (45th)	Joan Plowright	Olga	Stalin	HBO
1994 (46th)
1994 (46th)	Cicely Tyson	Castalia	Oldest Living Confederate Widow Tells All	CBS
1994 (46th)	Anne Bancroft	Lucy Marsden (age 99–100)	Oldest Living Confederate Widow Tells All	CBS
1994 (46th)	Swoosie Kurtz	Mrs. Johnstone	And the Band Played On	HBO
1994 (46th)	Lee Purcell	Ann Theilman	Secret Sins of the Father	NBC
1994 (46th)	Lily Tomlin	Dr. Selma Dritz	And the Band Played On	HBO
1995 (47th)
1995 (47th)	Judy Davis	Diane	Serving in Silence: The Margarethe Cammermeyer Story	NBC
1995 (47th)	Shirley Knight	Peggy Buckey	Indictment: The McMartin Trial	HBO
1995 (47th)	Sônia Braga	Regina de Carvalho	The Burning Season	HBO
1995 (47th)	Sissy Spacek	Spring Renfro	The Good Old Boys	TNT
1995 (47th)	Sada Thompson	Virginia McMartin	Indictment: The McMartin Trial	HBO
1996 (48th)
1996 (48th)	Greta Scacchi	Tsarina Alexandra	Rasputin	HBO
1996 (48th)	Kathy Bates	Helen Kushnick	The Late Shift	HBO
1996 (48th)	Diana Scarwid	Bess Truman	Truman	HBO
1996 (48th)	Mare Winningham	Sheila	The Boys Next Door	CBS
1996 (48th)	Alfre Woodard	Queen of Brobdingnag	Gulliver's Travels	NBC
1997 (49th)
1997 (49th)	Diana Rigg	Mrs. Danvers	Rebecca	PBS
1997 (49th)	Kirstie Alley	Rose Marie Clericuzio	The Last Don	CBS
1997 (49th)	Bridget Fonda	Anne	In the Gloaming	HBO
1997 (49th)	Glenne Headly	Aunt Ruth	Bastard Out of Carolina	Showtime
1997 (49th)	Frances McDormand	Gus	Hidden in America	Showtime
Outstanding Supporting Actress in a Miniseries or Movie
1998 (50th)
1998 (50th)	Mare Winningham	Lurleen Wallace	George Wallace	TNT
1998 (50th)	Helena Bonham Carter	Morgan le Fay	Merlin	NBC
1998 (50th)	Julie Harris	Leonora Nelson	Ellen Foster	CBS
1998 (50th)	Judith Ivey	Lucille	What the Deaf Man Heard	CBS
1998 (50th)	Angelina Jolie	Cornelia Wallace	George Wallace	TNT
1999 (51st)
1999 (51st)	Anne Bancroft	Gerry Eileen Cummins	Deep in My Heart	CBS
1999 (51st)	Jacqueline Bisset	Isabelle d'Arc	Joan of Arc	CBS
1999 (51st)	Olympia Dukakis	Mother Babette	Joan of Arc	CBS
1999 (51st)	Bebe Neuwirth	Dorothy Parker	Dash and Lilly	A&E
1999 (51st)	Cicely Tyson	Tante Lou	A Lesson Before Dying	HBO
1999 (51st)	Dianne Wiest	Sarah McClellan	The Simple Life of Noah Dearborn	CBS

=== 2000s ===
Year	Actress	Role	Program	Network
Outstanding Supporting Actress in a Miniseries or Movie
2000 (52nd)
2000 (52nd)	Vanessa Redgrave	Edith Tree	If These Walls Could Talk 2	HBO
2000 (52nd)	Kathy Bates	Agatha Hannigan	Annie	ABC
2000 (52nd)	Elizabeth Franz	Linda Loman	Death of a Salesman	Showtime
2000 (52nd)	Melanie Griffith	Marion Davies	RKO 281	HBO
2000 (52nd)	Maggie Smith	Betsey Trotwood	David Copperfield	PBS
2001 (53rd)
2001 (53rd)	Tammy Blanchard	Young Judy Garland	Life with Judy Garland: Me and My Shadows	ABC
2001 (53rd)	Anne Bancroft	Mama Gruber	Haven	CBS
2001 (53rd)	Brenda Blethyn	Auguste Van Pels	Anne Frank: The Whole Story	ABC
2001 (53rd)	Holly Hunter	Rebecca Waynon	Things You Can Tell Just by Looking at Her	Showtime
2001 (53rd)	Audra McDonald	Susie Monahan	Wit	HBO
2002 (54th)
2002 (54th)	Stockard Channing	Judy Shepard	The Matthew Shepard Story	NBC
2002 (54th)	Joan Allen	Morgause	The Mists of Avalon	TNT
2002 (54th)	Anjelica Huston	Viviane	The Mists of Avalon	TNT
2002 (54th)	Diana Rigg	Baroness Lehzen	Victoria and Albert	A&E
2002 (54th)	Sissy Spacek	Zelda Fitzgerald	Last Call	Showtime
2003 (55th)
2003 (55th)	Gena Rowlands	Virginia Miller	Hysterical Blindness	HBO
2003 (55th)	Kathy Baker	Gladys Sullivan	Door to Door	TNT
2003 (55th)	Anne Bancroft	Contessa	The Roman Spring of Mrs. Stone	Showtime
2003 (55th)	Juliette Lewis	Beth Tocyznski	Hysterical Blindness	HBO
2003 (55th)	Helen Mirren	Mrs. Porter	Door to Door	TNT
2004 (56th)
2004 (56th)	Mary-Louise Parker	Harper Pitt	Angels in America	HBO
2004 (56th)	Julie Andrews	Nanny	Eloise at Christmastime	ABC
2004 (56th)	Anne Heche	Rowena Larson	Gracie's Choice	Lifetime
2004 (56th)	Anjelica Huston	Carrie Chapman Catt	Iron Jawed Angels	HBO
2004 (56th)	Angela Lansbury	Dora	The Blackwater Lightship	CBS
2005 (57th)
2005 (57th)	Jane Alexander	Sara Roosevelt	Warm Springs	HBO
2005 (57th)	Kathy Bates	Helena Mahoney	Warm Springs	HBO
2005 (57th)	Camryn Manheim	Gladys Presley	Elvis	CBS
2005 (57th)	Charlize Theron	Britt Ekland	The Life and Death of Peter Sellers	HBO
2005 (57th)	Joanne Woodward	Francine Whiting	Empire Falls	HBO
2006 (58th)
2006 (58th)	Kelly Macdonald	Gina	The Girl in the Café	HBO
2006 (58th)	Ellen Burstyn	Gerda Stedman	Mrs. Harris	HBO
2006 (58th)	Shirley Jones	Aunt Batty	Hidden Places	Hallmark
2006 (58th)	Cloris Leachman	Pearl Schwartz	Mrs. Harris	HBO
2006 (58th)	Alfre Woodard	Mrs. Brown	The Water Is Wide	CBS
2007 (59th)
2007 (59th)	Judy Davis	Joan McAllister	The Starter Wife	USA
2007 (59th)	Toni Collette	Kathy Graham	Tsunami: The Aftermath	HBO
2007 (59th)	Samantha Morton	Myra Hindley	Longford	HBO
2007 (59th)	Anna Paquin	Elaine Goodale	Bury My Heart at Wounded Knee	HBO
2007 (59th)	Greta Scacchi	Mrs. Nola Johns	Broken Trail	AMC
2008 (60th)
2008 (60th)	Eileen Atkins	Deborah Jenkyns	Cranford	PBS
2008 (60th)	Laura Dern	Katherine Harris	Recount	HBO
2008 (60th)	Ashley Jensen	Maggie Jacobs	Extras: The Extra Special Series Finale	HBO
2008 (60th)	Audra McDonald	Ruth Younger	A Raisin in the Sun	ABC
2008 (60th)	Alfre Woodard	Edna Reilly	Pictures of Hollis Woods	CBS
2009 (61st)
2009 (61st)	Shohreh Aghdashloo	Sajida Khairallah Talfah	House of Saddam	HBO
2009 (61st)	Marcia Gay Harden	Janina Krzyżanowska	The Courageous Heart of Irena Sendler	CBS
2009 (61st)	Janet McTeer	Clementine Churchill	Into the Storm	HBO
2009 (61st)	Jeanne Tripplehorn	Jacqueline Kennedy Onassis	Grey Gardens	HBO
2009 (61st)	Cicely Tyson	Pearl	Relative Stranger	Hallmark

=== 2010s ===
Year	Actress	Role	Program	Network
Outstanding Supporting Actress in a Miniseries or Movie
2010 (62nd)
2010 (62nd)	Julia Ormond	Eustacia Grandin	Temple Grandin	HBO
2010 (62nd)	Kathy Bates	The Queen of Hearts	Alice	Syfy
2010 (62nd)	Catherine O'Hara	Aunt Ann	Temple Grandin	HBO
2010 (62nd)	Susan Sarandon	Janet Good	You Don't Know Jack	HBO
2010 (62nd)	Brenda Vaccaro	Margo Janus	You Don't Know Jack	HBO
2011 (63rd)
2011 (63rd)	Maggie Smith	Violet Crawley	Downton Abbey	PBS
2011 (63rd)	Eileen Atkins	Maud, Lady Holland	Upstairs, Downstairs	PBS
2011 (63rd)	Melissa Leo	Lucy Gessler	Mildred Pierce	HBO
2011 (63rd)	Mare Winningham	Ida Corwin	Mildred Pierce	HBO
2011 (63rd)	Evan Rachel Wood	Veda Pierce	Mildred Pierce	HBO
2012 (64th)
2012 (64th)	Jessica Lange	Constance Langdon	American Horror Story	FX
2012 (64th)	Frances Conroy	Moira O'Hara	American Horror Story	FX
2012 (64th)	Judy Davis	Jill Tankard	Page Eight	PBS
2012 (64th)	Sarah Paulson	Nicolle Wallace	Game Change	HBO
2012 (64th)	Mare Winningham	Sally McCoy	Hatfields & McCoys	History
2013 (65th)
2013 (65th)	Ellen Burstyn	Margaret Barrish	Political Animals	USA
2013 (65th)	Sarah Paulson	Lana Winters	American Horror Story: Asylum	FX
2013 (65th)	Charlotte Rampling	Sally Gilmartin / Eva Delectorskaya	Restless	Sundance
2013 (65th)	Imelda Staunton	Alma Reville	The Girl	HBO
2013 (65th)	Alfre Woodard	Louisa "Ouiser" Boudreaux	Steel Magnolias	Lifetime
2014 (66th)
2014 (66th)	Kathy Bates	Delphine LaLaurie	American Horror Story: Coven	FX
2014 (66th)	Angela Bassett	Marie Laveau	American Horror Story: Coven	FX
2014 (66th)	Ellen Burstyn	Olivia Foxworth	Flowers in the Attic	Lifetime
2014 (66th)	Frances Conroy	Myrtle Snow	American Horror Story: Coven	FX
2014 (66th)	Julia Roberts	Dr. Emma Brookner	The Normal Heart	HBO
2014 (66th)	Allison Tolman	Molly Solverson	Fargo	FX
Outstanding Supporting Actress in a Limited Series or Movie
2015 (67th)
2015 (67th)	Regina King	Aliyah Shadeed	American Crime	ABC
2015 (67th)	Angela Bassett	Desiree Dupree	American Horror Story: Freak Show	FX
2015 (67th)	Kathy Bates	Ethel Darling	American Horror Story: Freak Show	FX
2015 (67th)	Zoe Kazan	Denise Thibodeau	Olive Kitteridge	HBO
2015 (67th)	Mo'Nique	Ma Rainey	Bessie	HBO
2015 (67th)	Sarah Paulson	Bette and Dot Tattler	American Horror Story: Freak Show	FX
2016 (68th)
2016 (68th)	Regina King	Terri LaCroix	American Crime	ABC
2016 (68th)	Kathy Bates	Iris	American Horror Story: Hotel	FX
2016 (68th)	Olivia Colman	Angela Burr	The Night Manager	AMC
2016 (68th)	Melissa Leo	Lady Bird Johnson	All the Way	HBO
2016 (68th)	Sarah Paulson	Hypodermic Sally / Billie Dean Howard	American Horror Story: Hotel	FX
2016 (68th)	Jean Smart	Floyd Gerhardt	Fargo	FX
2017 (69th)
2017 (69th)	Laura Dern	Renata Klein	Big Little Lies	HBO
2017 (69th)	Judy Davis	Hedda Hopper	Feud: Bette and Joan	FX
2017 (69th)	Jackie Hoffman	Mamacita	Feud: Bette and Joan	FX
2017 (69th)	Regina King	Kimara Walters	American Crime	ABC
2017 (69th)	Michelle Pfeiffer	Ruth Madoff	The Wizard of Lies	HBO
2017 (69th)	Shailene Woodley	Jane Chapman	Big Little Lies	HBO
2018 (70th)
2018 (70th)	Merritt Wever	Mary Agnes McNue	Godless	Netflix
2018 (70th)	Sara Bareilles	Mary Magdalene	Jesus Christ Superstar Live in Concert	NBC
2018 (70th)	Penélope Cruz	Donatella Versace	The Assassination of Gianni Versace	FX
2018 (70th)	Judith Light	Marilyn Miglin	The Assassination of Gianni Versace	FX
2018 (70th)	Adina Porter	Beverly Hope	American Horror Story: Cult	FX
2018 (70th)	Letitia Wright	Nish Leigh	Black Museum (Black Mirror)	Netflix
2019 (71st)
2019 (71st)	Patricia Arquette	Dee Dee Blanchard	The Act	Hulu
2019 (71st)	Marsha Stephanie Blake	Linda McCray	When They See Us	Netflix
2019 (71st)	Patricia Clarkson	Adora Crellin	Sharp Objects	HBO
2019 (71st)	Vera Farmiga	Elizabeth Lederer	When They See Us	Netflix
2019 (71st)	Margaret Qualley	Ann Reinking	Fosse/Verdon	FX
2019 (71st)	Emily Watson	Ulana Khomyuk	Chernobyl	HBO

=== 2020s ===
Year	Actress	Role	Program	Network
Outstanding Supporting Actress in a Limited Series or Movie
2020 (72nd)
2020 (72nd)	Uzo Aduba	Shirley Chisholm	Mrs. America	FX
2020 (72nd)	Toni Collette	Detective Grace Rasmussen	Unbelievable	Netflix
2020 (72nd)	Margo Martindale	Bella Abzug	Mrs. America	FX
2020 (72nd)	Jean Smart	Agent Laurie Blake	Watchmen	HBO
2020 (72nd)	Holland Taylor	Ellen Kincaid	Hollywood	Netflix
2020 (72nd)	Tracey Ullman	Betty Friedan	Mrs. America	FX
Outstanding Supporting Actress in a Limited or Anthology Series or Movie
2021 (73rd)
2021 (73rd)	Julianne Nicholson	Lori Ross	Mare of Easttown	HBO
2021 (73rd)	Renée Elise Goldsberry	Angelica Schuyler	Hamilton	Disney+
2021 (73rd)	Kathryn Hahn	Agatha Harkness	WandaVision	Disney+
2021 (73rd)	Moses Ingram	Jolene	The Queen's Gambit	Netflix
2021 (73rd)	Jean Smart	Helen Fahey	Mare of Easttown	HBO
2021 (73rd)	Phillipa Soo	Eliza Hamilton	Hamilton	Disney+
2022 (74th)
2022 (74th)	Jennifer Coolidge	Tanya McQuoid	The White Lotus	HBO
2022 (74th)	Connie Britton	Nicole Mossbacher	The White Lotus	HBO
2022 (74th)	Alexandra Daddario	Rachel Patton	The White Lotus	HBO
2022 (74th)	Kaitlyn Dever	Betsy Mallum	Dopesick	Hulu
2022 (74th)	Natasha Rothwell	Belinda Lindsey	The White Lotus	HBO
2022 (74th)	Sydney Sweeney	Olivia Mossbacher	The White Lotus	HBO
2022 (74th)	Mare Winningham	Diane Mallum	Dopesick	Hulu
2023 (75th)
2023 (75th)	Niecy Nash-Betts	Glenda Cleveland	Dahmer – Monster: The Jeffrey Dahmer Story	Netflix
2023 (75th)	Annaleigh Ashford	Irene	Welcome to Chippendales	Hulu
2023 (75th)	Maria Bello	Jordan Forster	Beef	Netflix
2023 (75th)	Claire Danes	Rachel Fleishman	Fleishman Is in Trouble	FX
2023 (75th)	Juliette Lewis	Denise	Welcome to Chippendales	Hulu
2023 (75th)	Camila Morrone	Camila Alvarez	Daisy Jones & the Six	Prime Video
2023 (75th)	Merritt Wever	Frankie Pierce	Tiny Beautiful Things	Hulu
2024 (76th)
2024 (76th)	Jessica Gunning	Martha Scott	Baby Reindeer	Netflix
2024 (76th)	Dakota Fanning	Marge Sherwood	Ripley	Netflix
2024 (76th)	Lily Gladstone	Cam Bentland	Under the Bridge	Hulu
2024 (76th)	Aja Naomi King	Harriet Sloane	Lessons in Chemistry	Apple TV+
2024 (76th)	Diane Lane	Slim Keith	Feud: Capote vs. The Swans	FX
2024 (76th)	Nava Mau	Teri	Baby Reindeer	Netflix
2024 (76th)	Kali Reis	Detective Evangeline Navarro	True Detective: Night Country	HBO
2025 (77th)
2025 (77th)	Erin Doherty	Briony Ariston	Adolescence	Netflix
2025 (77th)	Ruth Negga	Barbara Sabich	Presumed Innocent	Apple TV+
2025 (77th)	Deirdre O'Connell	Francis Cobb	The Penguin	HBO
2025 (77th)	Chloë Sevigny	Mary Louise "Kitty" Menendez	Monsters: The Lyle and Erik Menendez Story	Netflix
2025 (77th)	Jenny Slate	Nikki Boyer	Dying for Sex	FX
2025 (77th)	Christine Tremarco	Manda Miller	Adolescence	Netflix
2026 (78th)
2026 (78th)	Linda Cardellini	Carol Love-Smernitch	DTF St. Louis	HBO
2026 (78th)	Dakota Fanning	Jenny Kaminski	All Her Fault	Peacock
2026 (78th)	Laurie Metcalf	Augusta Gein	Monster: The Ed Gein Story	Netflix
2026 (78th)	Joy Sunday	Jodie Plumb	DTF St. Louis	HBO
2026 (78th)	Youn Yuh-jung	Chairwoman Park	Beef	Netflix
2026 (78th)	Constance Zimmer	Ann Messina Freeman	Love Story: John F. Kennedy Jr. & Carolyn Bessette	FX

== Programs with multiple wins ==
2 wins

- American Crime
- American Horror Story

== Programs with multiple nominations ==
12 nominations

- American Horror Story

5 nominations

- The White Lotus

3 nominations

- American Crime
- Eleanor and Franklin
- Feud
- Mildred Pierce
- Miss Rose White
- Monster
- Mrs. America

2 nominations

- Adolescence
- American Crime Story
- And the Band Played On
- Baby Reindeer
- Backstairs at the White House
- Beef
- Big Little Lies
- Cat on a Hot Tin Roof
- Dopesick
- DTF St. Louis
- Fargo
- George Wallace
- Hamilton
- Hysterical Blindness
- Indictment: The McMartin Trial
- Joan of Arc
- Mare of Easttown
- The Mists of Avalon
- Mrs. Harris
- Oldest Living Confederate Widow Tells All
- Playing for Time
- QB VII
- Temple Grandin
- The Thorn Birds
- Warm Springs
- Welcome to Chippendales
- When They See Us
- The Women's Room
- You Don't Know Jack

== Performers with multiple wins ==
2 wins

- Jane Alexander
- Judy Davis
- Colleen Dewhurst
- Regina King (consecutive)
- Mare Winningham

== Performers with multiple nominations ==
7 nominations

- Kathy Bates

6 nominations

- Mare Winningham

5 nominations

- Anne Bancroft
- Judy Davis
- Colleen Dewhurst
- Alfre Woodard

4 nominations

- Sarah Paulson

3 nominations

- Ellen Burstyn
- Stockard Channing
- Ruby Dee
- Patty Duke
- Penny Fuller
- Eileen Heckart
- Regina King
- Piper Laurie
- Cloris Leachman
- Vanessa Redgrave
- Jean Smart
- Cicely Tyson

2 nominations

- Jane Alexander
- Eileen Atkins
- Angela Bassett
- Polly Bergen
- Toni Collette
- Frances Conroy
- Laura Dern
- Olympia Dukakis
- Dakota Fanning
- Julie Harris
- Glenne Headly
- Anjelica Huston
- Shirley Knight
- Swoosie Kurtz
- Melissa Leo
- Juliette Lewis
- Audra McDonald
- Rosemary Murphy
- Patricia Neal
- Diana Rigg
- Greta Scacchi
- Sissy Spacek
- Maggie Smith
- Merritt Wever

== See also ==
- TCA Award for Individual Achievement in Drama
- Critics' Choice Television Award for Best Supporting Actress in a Movie/Miniseries
- Golden Globe Award for Best Supporting Actress – Series, Miniseries, or Television Film
- Screen Actors Guild Award for Outstanding Performance by a Female Actor in a Miniseries or Television Movie
