= Emily B. Fox =

American data scientist and statistician

Emily Beth Fox is an American data scientist and statistician, a professor of statistics at Stanford University, and an executive for drug discovery firm insitro. Her research applies Bayesian modeling of time series, Hierarchical Dirichlet processes, and Monte Carlo methods to problems in health and neuroscience.

== Education and career ==
Fox majored in electrical engineering at the Massachusetts Institute of Technology (MIT), graduating in 2004. She continued at MIT for a master's degree in 2005 and a Ph.D. in 2009, with the dissertation Bayesian Nonparametric Learning of Complex Dynamical Phenomena jointly supervised by Alan S. Willsky and John W. Fisher III.

After postdoctoral research at Duke University, she became an assistant professor of statistics in the Wharton School of the University of Pennsylvania in 2011. She moved to the University of Washington in 2012 as Amazon Machine Learning Assistant Professor in Statistics. She was promoted to associate professor and full professor in 2016 and 2020 respectively. From 2018 to 2021 she was also a distinguished engineer and lead of Health AI at Apple Inc. In 2021 she moved to her present position as a professor of statistics at Stanford.

In 2024, drug discovery firm insitro announced that it had hired Fox to become senior vice president of AI/machine learning.

== Recognition ==
Fox was a Sloan Fellow from 2015 to 2017, and was a 2017 recipient of a Presidential Early Career Award for Scientists and Engineers.

In 2024 she was named as a Fellow of the Institute of Mathematical Statistics, "for broad-ranging and highly impactful seminal work on large-scale Bayesian dynamic modeling, sparse network models, and related development of efficient computational algorithms for Bayesian inference, and for applications in health and the study of biomedicine. algorithms for Bayesian inference".
