= Marty Byrde =

Fictional character in Ozark

- Ozark character
- Jason Bateman as Marty Byrde
- First appearance: "Sugarwood" (2017)
- Last appearance: "A Hard Way to Go" (2022)
- Created by: Bill Dubuque; Mark Williams
- Portrayed by: Jason Bateman; Jet Jurgensmeyer (young)

In-universe information
- Full name: Martin Byrde
- Occupation: Money launderer Financial advisor
- Spouse: Wendy Byrde
- Children: Jonah Byrde; Charlotte Byrde

Martin "Marty" Byrde is a fictional character and the protagonist in the Netflix crime drama series Ozark. He is the top money launderer for a Mexican drug cartel.

== Character biography ==
=== Background ===
Marty Byrde is a mild-mannered financial advisor and graduate of Indiana State University. He was raised in South Bend, Indiana. He initially runs a wealth management firm out of Chicago that he founded with Bruce Liddell, his best friend since college. Marty has been married since 1995 to his wife, Wendy Davis, a former political consultant, with whom he has two children, Charlotte and Jonah. Wendy suffered a miscarriage around the time of the Great Recession after she and Marty got into a car crash. In 2007, Marty was recruited by Camino Del Rio (known simply as "Del"), a top enforcer for Mexico's Navarro drug cartel, to launder money for the organization through his and Bruce's firm. In 2017, Del discovers that Marty's partner, Bruce Liddell, has skimmed $8 million of the cartel's money through the trucking company that transports the cash, and executes Bruce alongside the trucking company owners. In a last-ditch effort to plead for his life, Marty shows Del a vacation flier for the Lake of the Ozarks that Bruce had given him earlier in the day and claims that it is an optimal location for money laundering due to its separation from federal law enforcement. Marty says if he is allowed to live, he will launder $500 million in five years. The cartel partly agrees, and Marty replaces the skimmed money by liquidating his assets. He then sells his home and moves his family to Osage Beach, Missouri.

=== Season 1 ===
Before arriving in the Ozarks, Marty learns Wendy is cheating on him. This strains the Byrde family's transition from Chicago. After arriving in the Ozarks, Marty searches for local businesses to purchase that he can use to launder the cartel's money. He eventually purchases the Blue Cat Lodge, a boating resort run by Rachel Garrison, and the Lickety Splitz, a local strip club owned by Bobby Dean. Unbeknownst to Marty, the strip club is also a money-laundering racket for the local heroin-dealing Snell family, led by Darlene and Jacob Snell.

Throughout the season, Marty and his family encounter many obstacles in their money laundering scheme. Their cash is initially stolen by Ruth Langmore, a young woman belonging to a family of local criminals, but Marty negotiates it back from the Langmores and hires Ruth as a dishwasher at the Blue Cat, going on to enlist her aid in his money laundering schemes and developing a close, familial bond with her as a result. Marty's activities draw the attention of FBI agent Roy Petty, who has tailed him from Chicago and is working undercover in the Ozarks. Furthermore, the Snells, who use pastor Mason Young's waterfront boating church congregation as a heroin distribution racket, murder the pastor's pregnant wife after Marty and Wendy feign interest in building an actual church for him. The Snells leave the baby on Mason's doorstep, rendering him a single father. Rachel steals a significant amount of money from the Byrde family and disappears. Ruth murders her uncles Russ and Boyd when they try to kill Marty for his money.

When Del's lieutenant Garcia realizes little progress is being made, he begins spying on Wendy and the children and catches them in their home as they prepare to flee the Ozarks with identities Marty had arranged for them. However, Buddy, a terminally ill tenant living in the Byrdes' lakefront home, kills Garcia, and he and Marty dispose of the body at a funeral home Wendy had procured for the Byrdes' laundering. Del arrives in the Ozarks looking for Garcia tortures Marty in an attempt to locate his whereabouts. Concocting another plan, Marty tells Del that he will work with the Snells to build a riverboat casino to launder the rest of the money. Del and Marty meet with the Snells and finalize the deal, but Darlene shoots Del in the head with a shotgun after he calls them "rednecks". Marty is forced to continue with the casino plan. Wendy and the children decide to stay with Marty rather than flee.

=== Season 2 ===
Disillusioned by the Snells' impulsive violence and the perceived danger to his own family, Marty begins planning the family's escape to the Gold Coast of Australia. When Wendy finds out, she feels the plan is flawed and opts to protect the family using a different approach. While Wendy begins to establish important ties with the Kansas City mafia, her increasing disregard for Marty's input on decisions strains their relationship further.

Marty and Wendy must now deal with Navarro cartel attorney Helen Pierce and her bodyguard, James Franks, who have replaced Del as the cartel's representatives in the Ozarks. After FBI Agent Petty successfully raids the Byrde home, Helen assists with the damage control. Mason, however, kidnaps Wendy and ties her up in his cellar after his son, Zeke, is taken into state custody. Marty retrieves Zeke from the state and returns him to Mason, but he is forced to shoot and kill Mason when he threatens to stab Wendy in the neck with a screwdriver. The incident leaves Marty traumatized.

Ruth, meanwhile, is trapped between working for Cade, her volatile father recently released from prison, and Marty. Cade kills Agent Petty, solving a problem for the Byrdes, but Wendy has the cartel kill Cade in retaliation for assaulting Charlotte. Her decision to have Cade killed further widens the rift in her marriage to Marty. Now that it is safe to stay in the Ozarks, Marty prepares to open his casino.

=== Season 3 ===
Marty and Ruth now manage the Missouri Belle, the riverboat casino being used for the Byrdes' laundering scheme. Wendy and Charlotte handle public relations. While the FBI is constantly monitoring the casino's activities, they are unable to prove that Marty is laundering money. Wendy's brother, Ben Davis, shows up in the Ozarks and begins living with the Byrdes, soon forming a romance with Ruth. Marty, now immensely distrustful of Wendy, begins secretly monitoring her calls with Navarro. However, Navarro has Marty kidnapped and taken to his estate in Mexico to see if Wendy and Helen can launder the money without Marty, which ultimately fails. Marty is able to negotiate his release by promising to turn FBI agent Maya Miller to their side, despite knowing that she is incorruptible. Marty forms an uneasy partnership with Maya, who offers him a chance to work for the FBI in exchange for serving prison time.

Marty and Wendy begin seeing a therapist named Sue. Unbeknownst to Wendy, Marty is bribing Sue to side with her so that Wendy does not get upset. Their relationship is further strained when Wendy is forced to divulge the nature of the Byrdes' activities to Ben, who witnessed Marty's kidnapping. Ben, who is bipolar, grows disillusioned with their crimes and lashes out at Marty, Helen, and Helen's daughter Erin. Helen resolves to kill Ben, forcing Marty to escort him to safety.

When Wendy abandons Ben on a road trip and leaves him to die at Nelson's hands, Wendy has Ben's body cremated at the funeral home. Jonah discovers Ben's ashes and realizes what happened, permanently damaging his relationship with his mother. Ruth, infuriated with Wendy, quits working for the Byrdes and joins Darlene's heroin operation. Marty and Wendy win Navarro over, resulting in Helen's death and the Byrdes' position in the cartel cemented.

=== Season 4 ===
In Mexico, Marty and Wendy are introduced to Navarro's hotheaded nephew Javier "Javi" Elizondro, whom Navarro says has ambitions to take over the cartel and is awaiting an opportunity to kill them all. Navarro gives Marty and Wendy a final assignment that would fulfill their obligation to him: broker a deal with the FBI allowing Navarro to retire from the cartel with immunity.

Marty and Wendy start by arranging a deal with Clare Shaw, CEO of her family's Chicago-based pharmaceutical giant, to provide the cartel's heroin to the company as raw materials in exchange for the company donating to the Byrdes' charitable organization. Javi begins frequenting the Ozarks as the cartel's representative in the deal, jeopardizing the Byrdes' attempts to secure Navarro's immunity. Marty convinces Navarro to give up Javi's weapons shipments across the border to the FBI, leading Javi to cut off heroin shipments to Shaw Medical until the "mole" in the cartel is uncovered. As a stopgap, Marty privately offers to Ruth that he buy all of Darlene's heroin from her, without Darlene's knowledge. Ruth agrees, temporarily mending her relationship with Marty. Jonah, meanwhile, moves out of the Byrdes' home due to his strained relationship with his mother.

During their meeting with Navarro, the FBI suddenly changes course and asks him to remain in charge of the cartel for another five years while providing them with intelligence. An incensed Maya goes rogue and has Navarro arrested before news cameras, prompting Javi to nearly kill Marty until Wendy convinces Navarro to call Javi from jail to loop him in on the FBI's arrangement with the cartel. The FBI then make the same deal with Javi (but for a 10-year period). Afterwards, Javi executes Darlene and Wyatt in retaliation for the former's continued heroin sales. Ruth discovers the bodies and arrives at the Byrdes' home with a shotgun, threatening to kill Marty unless he identify Wyatt's killer. Jonah gives Javi's name to Ruth, who resolves to kill Javi despite Marty and Wendy's protestations.

== Reception ==
New York Times TV critic Mike Hale described Marty Byrde as a "middle-aged anti-hero" fueled by "a sense of unkept American promises". Hale likened Marty Byrde to Bryan Cranston's character, Walter White, the main character of the crime drama Breaking Bad. He further lauded the character's personality, writing: "Ozark uses Marty’s voice-over musings about hard work and the wages of parenthood to give the appearance of gravitas, but the show’s through-line is really just his resourcefulness in the face of gruesome, cartel-style justice."

=== Accolades ===
Award	Year	Category	Result	Ref.
AACTA International Awards	2021	Best Actor in a Series	Nominated	
Actor Awards	2018	Outstanding Male Actor in a Drama Series	Nominated	
Actor Awards	2019	Outstanding Male Actor in a Drama Series	Won	
Actor Awards	2019	Outstanding Ensemble in a Drama Series	Nominated	
Actor Awards	2021	Outstanding Male Actor in a Drama Series	Won	
Actor Awards	2021	Outstanding Ensemble in a Drama Series	Nominated	
Actor Awards	2023	Outstanding Male Actor in a Drama Series	Won	
Actor Awards	2023	Outstanding Ensemble in a Drama Series	Nominated	
Critics' Choice Television Awards	2021	Best Actor in a Drama Series	Nominated	
Golden Globes	2018	Best Actor in a Television Series – Drama	Nominated	
Golden Globes	2019	Best Actor in a Television Series – Drama	Nominated	
Golden Globes	2021	Best Actor in a Television Series – Drama	Nominated	
Primetime Emmy Awards	2018	Outstanding Lead Actor in a Drama Series	Nominated	
Primetime Emmy Awards	2018	Outstanding Directing for a Drama Series	Nominated	
Primetime Emmy Awards	2019	Outstanding Drama Series	Nominated	
Primetime Emmy Awards	2019	Outstanding Lead Actor in a Drama Series	Nominated	
Primetime Emmy Awards	2019	Outstanding Directing for a Drama Series	Won	
Primetime Emmy Awards	2020	Outstanding Drama Series	Nominated	
Primetime Emmy Awards	2020	Outstanding Lead Actor in a Drama Series	Nominated	
Primetime Emmy Awards	2022	Outstanding Drama Series	Nominated	
Primetime Emmy Awards	2022	Outstanding Lead Actor in a Drama Series	Nominated	
Primetime Emmy Awards	2022	Outstanding Directing for a Drama Series	Nominated	
Satellite Awards	2018	Best Actor in a Drama / Genre Series	Nominated	
Satellite Awards	2020	Best Actor in a Drama / Genre Series	Nominated	

== In popular culture ==
A restaurant located in Lake Ozark, Missouri is named after the character.
