= Jason Bateman =

American actor (born 1969)

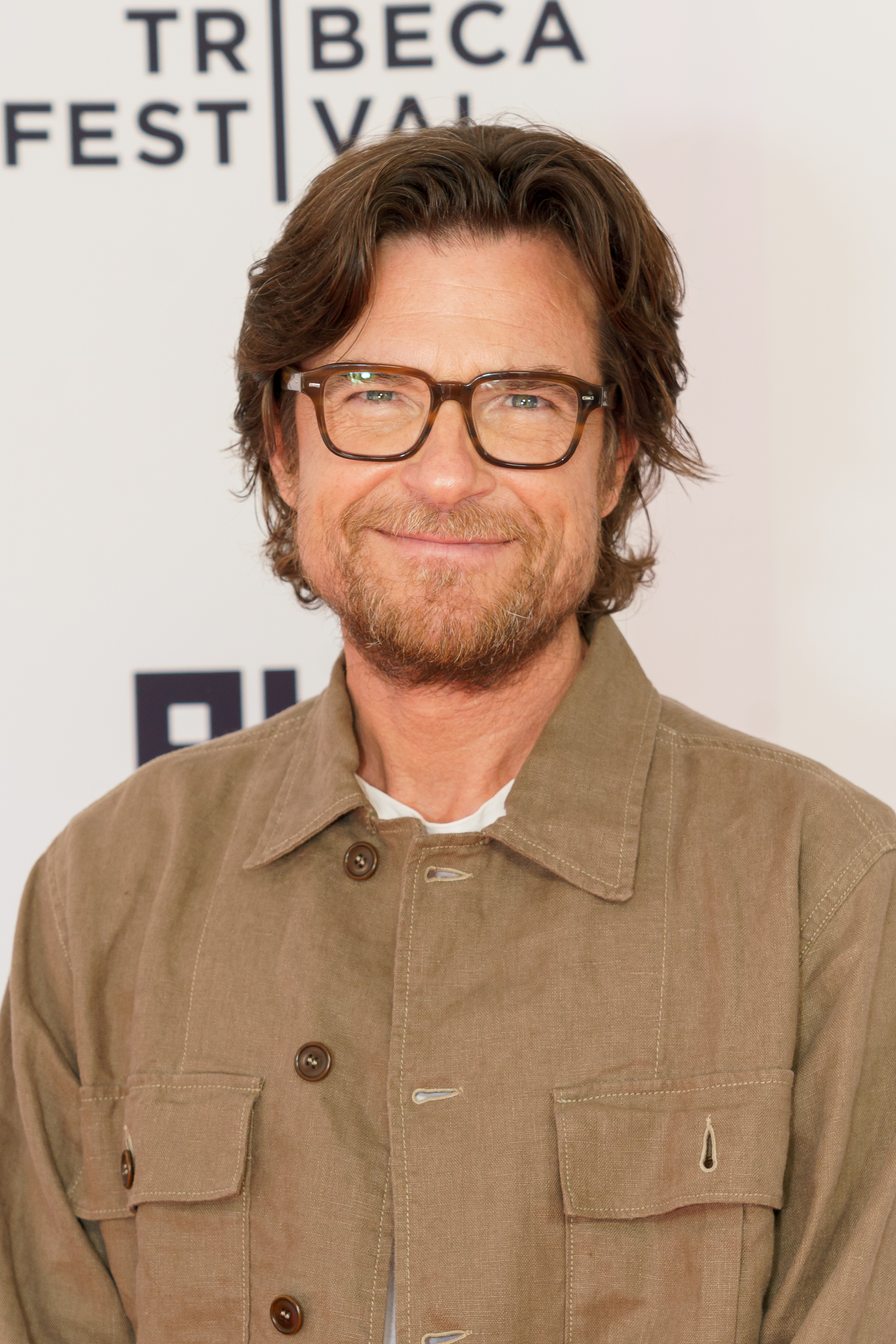
- Bateman in 2026
- Born: Jason Kent Bateman; January 14, 1969 (age 57); Rye, New York, U.S.
- Occupation: Actor
- Years active: 1981–present
- Works: Full list
- Spouse: Amanda Anka (m. 2001)
- Children: 2
- Father: Kent Bateman
- Relatives: Justine Bateman (sister)
- Awards: Full list

Jason Kent Bateman (born January 14, 1969) is an American actor. He is known for his roles as Michael Bluth in the Fox/Netflix sitcom Arrested Development (2003–2019), Nick Wilde in Disney’s Zootopia franchise (2016–present), and Marty Byrde in the Netflix crime drama series Ozark (2017–2022), as well as for his work in numerous comedy films. His accolades include a Golden Globe Award and two Primetime Emmy Awards.

Bateman began his career as a child actor, appearing on television in the early 1980s on shows such as the NBC drama series Little House on the Prairie from 1981 to 1982 and The Hogan Family from 1986 to 1991. Bateman's early film roles include Teen Wolf Too (1987) and Necessary Roughness (1991) before taking supporting roles in The Break-Up (2006), Juno (2007), Hancock (2008), and Up in the Air (2009).

Bateman went on to star in various successful comedy films such as The Switch (2010), The Change-Up (2011), Horrible Bosses (2011), Identity Thief (2013), This Is Where I Leave You (2014), Horrible Bosses 2 (2014), Office Christmas Party (2016), and Game Night (2018). He expanded into dramatic roles with The Gift (2015), The Outsider (2020), Air (2023), and Carry-On (2024).

Bateman made his directorial debut with an episode of The Hogan Family, at the time setting the record for the youngest director in the Directors Guild of America. He has since directed and starred in the films Bad Words (2013) and The Family Fang (2015), and the television series Ozark, The Outsider (2020), Black Rabbit (2025), and DTF St. Louis (2026). Bateman was awarded the Primetime Emmy Award for Outstanding Directing for a Drama Series in 2019 for his direction on Ozark.

== Early life ==
Bateman was born in Rye, New York, and was four years old when his family moved to Salt Lake City, Utah, and later to California. His mother, Victoria Elizabeth, was a flight attendant for Pan Am who was originally from Shrewsbury in the United Kingdom. His father, Kent Bateman, is an American actor, writer, and director of film and television. His older sister is actress Justine Bateman.

Bateman, like many child actors, attended Brighton Hall School, without graduating. In an interview with Wired Magazine, Bateman admitted that he never received his diploma due to not finishing his finals while filming Teen Wolf Too.

Bateman's and Justine's earnings from their television shows were a significant income source for their parents, allowing the family to afford their home and other essentials. The reliance on a portion of Bateman's earnings from acting caused him to feel anxious and under pressure to keep roles and remain in the acting industry as a whole. As an actor, Bateman was managed by his father until he was 20, when the business relationship was dissolved.

== Career ==
=== Television ===
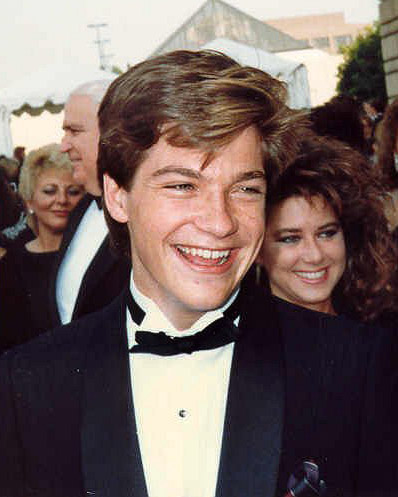
Bateman in 1987

Bateman first appeared in a cereal commercial for Golden Grahams in 1980 and began his television career on Little House on the Prairie as James Cooper, an orphaned boy who, along with his sister, is adopted by the Ingalls family. From 1982 to 1984, he was a supporting character on the television show Silver Spoons as Ricky Schroder's "bad boy" best friend Derek Taylor. He appeared in the Knight Rider third-season episode "Lost Knight" in 1984, and a number of other small television roles. In 1984, in response to his popularity on Silver Spoons, the show's producers gave Bateman his own starring role as Matthew Burton on the NBC sitcom It's Your Move, from September 1984 to February 1985. In 1987, he appeared with Burt Reynolds on the men's team in the inaugural week of game show Win, Lose or Draw.

Bateman earned the status of teen idol in the mid-1980s for his television work, most notably as David Hogan on The Hogan Family (originally titled Valerie and later, Valerie's Family, after Valerie Harper left the series). He became the Directors Guild of America's youngest-ever director when, at age 18, he directed three episodes of The Hogan Family. In 1987, he gained international recognition in the motion picture sequel Teen Wolf Too, which was a box office failure. In 1994 he played opposite Katharine Hepburn and Anthony Quinn in the television film This Can't Be Love. During this period, he had roles on four series – Simon, Chicago Sons, George & Leo, and Some of My Best Friends – none of which lasted longer than one season. He also directed an episode of Two of a Kind in 1999. In 2002, he played the frisky sibling of Thomas Jane's character in the feature film The Sweetest Thing.

In 2003, Bateman was cast as Michael Bluth in the comedy series Arrested Development. Although critically acclaimed, the series never achieved high ratings and ended on February 10, 2006. The show was revived in spring 2013. Bateman won several awards for his work on the series, including a Golden Globe for Best Actor in a Television Series Musical or Comedy. He was also nominated in 2005 for the Emmy Award for Outstanding Actor in a Comedy Series. New episodes of Arrested Development have been released on Netflix with the original cast, including Bateman. Bateman performed commentary on the 2004 Democratic National Convention for The Majority Report with Arrested Development co-star David Cross, and hosted NBC's Saturday Night Live on February 12, 2005. In 2006, he appeared as a guest star on the Scrubs episode "My Big Bird" as Mr. Sutton, a garbage man with a flock of vicious ostriches as pets. In 2009, Bateman became a regular voice actor for the short-lived Fox comedy series Sit Down, Shut Up. He voiced Larry Littlejunk, the gym teacher and only staff member who can teach.

In 2010, Bateman and Arrested Development co-star Will Arnett created "DumbDumb Productions", a production company focusing on digital content. Their first video was "Prom Date", the first in a series of "Dirty Shorts" for Orbit. In 2012, Bateman returned to his role of Michael Bluth for the revival of Arrested Development along with the rest of the original cast. The now-Netflix-sponsored series released season 4 on its Instant Watch website on May 26, 2013. The series was expected to continue its run as well as a potential feature film. For the new fourth season, Bateman was once again nominated for Outstanding Actor in a Comedy Series. Netflix confirmed that the entire cast of the show would be returning for a fifth season, which premiered on May 29, 2018 and concluded on March 15, 2019.

In 2017, Bateman returned to television as both actor and director in the Netflix crime drama Ozark, in which he plays a financial advisor who must relocate his family to Missouri in order to launder money for a Mexican drug cartel. Bateman's performance as Marty Byrde has drawn positive comparisons to Bryan Cranston's portrayal of Walter White in AMC's Breaking Bad. The series ran for four seasons till 2022, and Bateman directed seven episodes over the course of its run (including the series finale). He won a Primetime Emmy Award for Outstanding Directing for a Drama Series in 2019 for his work on the second-season premiere.

In 2020, Bateman directed, executive produced, and co-starred in the first two episodes of the HBO crime miniseries The Outsider, based on the Stephen King novel of the same name. He served as executive producer on several miniseries, including A Teacher (2020), Under the Banner of Heaven (2021), Florida Man and Lessons in Chemistry (both 2023), before returning to directing and acting with Netflix's Black Rabbit (2025), where he starred opposite Jude Law. In 2026, he starred in Steven Conrad's black comedy miniseries DTF St. Louis for HBO, alongside David Harbour and Linda Cardellini.

=== Film ===
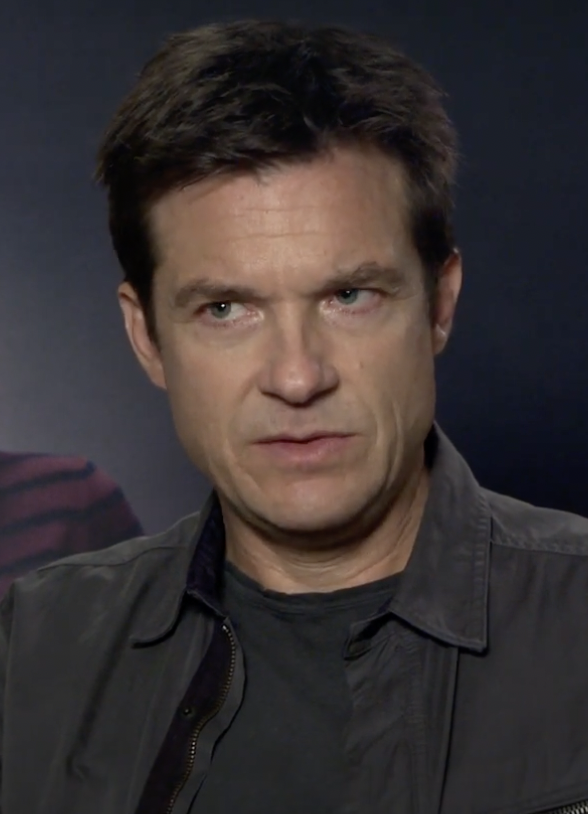
Bateman in March 2018

In 2004, Bateman appeared in Dodgeball: A True Underdog Story as ESPN 8 ("The Ocho") commentator Pepper Brooks, and in Starsky & Hutch as Kevin, Vince Vaughn's business partner. He reunited with Vaughn in 2006's The Break-Up. In 2007, he played former lawyer Rupert "Rip" Reed alongside Ben Affleck in Smokin' Aces and also starred in The Kingdom, Mr. Magorium's Wonder Emporium, and Juno. In 2008, he co-starred with Will Smith and Charlize Theron in the superhero film Hancock. Bateman's 2009 films included Extract, written and directed by Mike Judge, and Couples Retreat, reuniting with Vaughn in a comedy chronicling four couples who partake in therapy sessions at a tropical island resort (Kristen Bell played his wife). In 2010, he starred in The Switch, a romantic comedy, with Jennifer Aniston. In 2011, he played the role of Special Agent Lorenzo Zoil in the comedy Paul and starred in Horrible Bosses and The Change-Up.

In March 2012, Mansome, Bateman's first executive producer credit with Will Arnett, was announced as a Spotlight selection for the Tribeca Film Festival. The documentary, directed by Morgan Spurlock, is a comedic look at male identity as it is defined through men's grooming habits, featuring celebrity and expert commentary. He made a dramatic turn in 2012 with the thriller film Disconnect, and starred in the 2013 comedy film Identity Thief and the 2014 comedies This Is Where I Leave You and Horrible Bosses 2. He also narrated the 2014 documentary Pump. In 2015 Bateman headlined Joel Edgerton's thriller film The Gift, opposite Rebecca Hall and Edgerton. His production company Aggregate Films extended its deal with Universal.

In 2013, Bateman made his feature film directorial debut with Bad Words, in which he also starred. He also directed and starred in an adaptation of The Family Fang. Bateman voiced Nick Wilde, the con artist fox in Zootopia in 2016. In 2018 he starred in and produced the action comedy film Game Night. His performance was widely praised and he received nominations for best performance by a comedic actor at the San Diego Film Critics Society Awards and the Critics' Choice Awards.

Bateman is in the video for the Mumford & Sons song "Hopeless Wanderer".

In 2020, Bateman was set to co-star and direct the Clue remake with Ryan Reynolds. He later had to back out, reportedly due to schedule conflicts with Ozark. In March 2022, Bateman signed on to direct the film Project Artemis, starring Scarlett Johansson, for Apple Studios, but departed the project in June due to creative differences; he was eventually replaced as director by Greg Berlanti. Announced in September 2022, Bateman is tapped to direct Netflix's Dark Wire, a film based on Joseph Cox's novel of the same name. In January 2023, Bateman signed on to direct The Pinkerton for Warner Bros. Pictures and Bad Robot, and will also serve as executive producer. Bateman was an executive producer for Outlast, which premiered in 2023.

Bateman played supporting roles in Ben Affleck's docudrama Air (2023) as Nike marketing VP Rob Strasser, and the Netflix thriller Carry-On (2024), where he received praise for his against-type performance as the antagonist. He reprised his role as Nick Wilde in Zootopia 2, which was released on November 26, 2025, and will voice Nick Wilde again in Zootopia 3.

In October 2025, it was announced that Bateman is going to direct John Grisham's adaptation of The Partner, starring and produced by Tom Holland. In March 2026, it was announced that Bateman will be directing an original Netflix film starring Woody Harrelson and Sam Rockwell, entitled The Cackling of the Dodos.

=== Theme parks ===
Bateman voices Nick Wilde in the Disney Parks attraction Zootopia: Better Zoogether!, which opened November 7, 2025 at Disney's Animal Kingdom in Orlando, Florida. Bateman admitted in an interview alongside his Zootopia co-star Ginnifer Goodwin that he had no idea about the attraction's existence before its opening.

=== Podcast ===
In July 2020, Bateman, along with Will Arnett and Sean Hayes, created a comedy and talk podcast called SmartLess. In 2022, Bateman created a media company SmartLess Media in order to create four additional podcasts. In 2023, Apple revealed that SmartLess was #4 of the year's Top Shows.

== Personal life ==
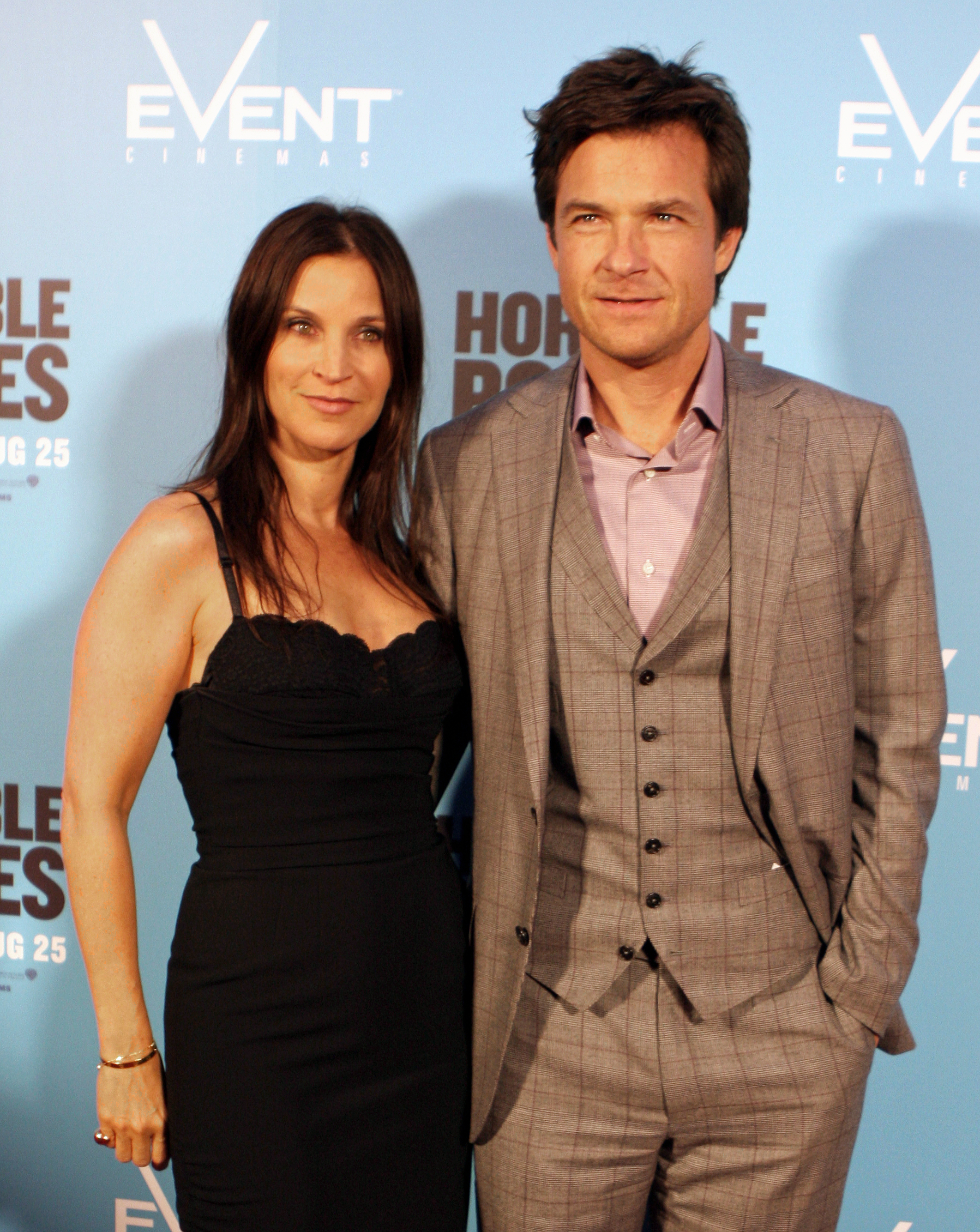
Bateman with wife Amanda Anka in August 2011

In 1987, Bateman won the celebrity portion of the Long Beach Grand Prix.

Bateman married actress Amanda Anka, daughter of Anne de Zogheb (1942–2017) and singer Paul Anka, on July 3, 2001. They have two daughters who were born in 2006 and 2012.

Throughout the 1990s, Bateman struggled with an addiction to alcohol and drugs; he stated in a 2009 interview, “I'd worked so hard that by the time I was 20, I wanted to play hard. And I did that really well ... it was like Risky Business for ten years."

Bateman, along with Arrested Development co-stars David Cross and Tony Hale, was criticized for seemingly defending Jeffrey Tambor's volatile behavior on the set of Arrested Development. During a May 2018 cast interview for The New York Times Bateman attempted to defuse the controversy. Within days after the interview, all three men issued apologies to Jessica Walter. Bateman retrospectively stated he had overreached in his attempt to analyze the cause of Tambor's behavior.

Bateman is a fan of the Los Angeles Dodgers baseball team.

Bateman endorsed the film The Promise, a movie about the Armenian genocide.
