= Emily Jane Fox =

American reporter and author

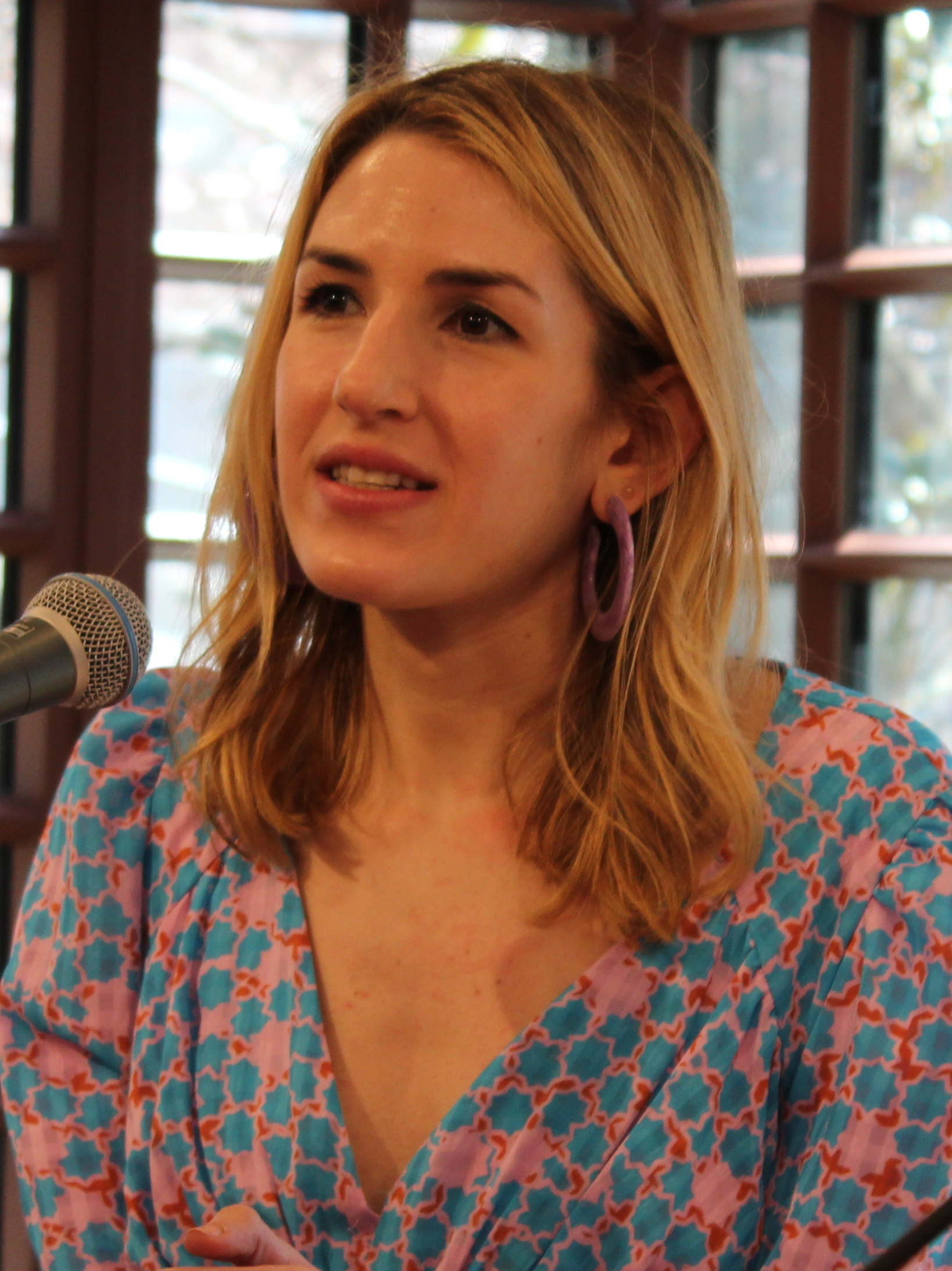
- Fox in 2019
- Born: 1988 or 1989 (age 37–38)
- Education: University of Pennsylvania; Columbia University
- Occupations: Journalist, author
- Years active: 2010–present
- Known for: Political reporting

Emily Jane Fox is a former American reporter for Vanity Fair online magazine The Hive and author of the 2018 book Born Trump: Inside America's First Family.

== Education ==
Fox graduated from the University of Pennsylvania in 2011. In the summer before her senior year she worked as an intern at the White House. She then studied at Columbia University Graduate School of Journalism.

== Career ==
Fox began her journalism career as a business reporter for CNN. She left to work for Vanity Fair's The Hive. She is also a contributor for NBC News and MSNBC. In 2015, she started covering Ivanka Trump for The Hive during the presidential campaign. In November 2016, Fox, after an agent contacted her, began writing a behind-the-scenes book about President Donald Trump's three marriages and his relationship with his five children, as well as his son-in-law and advisor Jared Kushner. For more than a year, she followed the Trump adult children and interviewed more than 150 people. Her book, Born Trump: Inside America's First Family, was released by HarperCollins Publishers in June 2018. Born Trump made The New York Times nonfiction bestseller list at number 8 in July 2018.

== Recognition ==
In 2013, while reporting for CNN Money, Fox received the Martha Coman Award for Best New Journalist from the Newswomen's Club of New York City.
