= Black Rabbit =

2025 American television miniseries

- Promotional poster
- Genre: Crime drama; Thriller
- Created by: Zach Baylin; Kate Susman
- Starring: Jude Law; Jason Bateman; Cleopatra Coleman; Sope Dirisu; Amaka Okafor; Troy Kotsur
- Music by: Danny Bensi; Saunder Jurriaans
- Country of origin: United States
- Original language: English
- No. of episodes: 8

Production
- Executive producers: Jason Bateman; Jude Law; Zach Baylin; Kate Susman; Michael Costigan; Ben Jackson; Zac Frognowski; David Bernon; Brian Kavanaugh-Jones; Justin Levy; Andrew Hinderaker; Erica Kay
- Cinematography: Igor Martinovic; Peter Konczal
- Editors: Vikash Patel; Kyle Reiter; Cedric Nairn-Smith
- Running time: 44–68 minutes
- Production companies: Aggregate Films; Riff Raff Entertainment; Youngblood Pictures; Range; Colossal Productions

Original release
- Network: Netflix
- Release: September 18, 2025

Black Rabbit is an American crime thriller television miniseries created by Zach Baylin and Kate Susman for Netflix starring Jude Law and Jason Bateman. It was released on Netflix on September 18, 2025.

== Premise ==
When the owner of a New York City hotspot allows his chaotic brother back into his life, he opens the door to escalating dangers that threaten to bring down everything he's built.

The events are partially based on the controversies surrounding NYC restaurant The Spotted Pig.

== Cast ==
=== Main ===
- Jude Law as Jake Friedken, the owner and co-founder of a restaurant and VIP lounge named Black Rabbit
- Jason Bateman as Vince Friedken, Jake's older brother and the co-founder and former co-owner of Black Rabbit
- Cleopatra Coleman as Estelle, Black Rabbit's interior designer and Wes' girlfriend
- Sope Dirisu as Wes, a successful recording artist and an investor in Black Rabbit, whose music career Jake used to manage
- Amaka Okafor as Roxie, Black Rabbit's head chef
- Troy Kotsur as Joe Mancuso, a major New York City loan shark

=== Recurring ===
- Robin de Jesús as Tony, the sous-chef at Black Rabbit
- Chris Coy as Babbitt, Joe's right-hand man
- Dagmara Domińczyk as Val, Jake's ex-wife and Hunter's mother
- Abbey Lee as Anna, a bartender at Black Rabbit
- Don Harvey as Matt, Vince's friend
- Odessa Young as Gen, Vince's estranged adult daughter
- Gus Birney as Mel Whitney, a hostess at Black Rabbit
- Forrest Weber as Junior, Joe's son
- Amir Malaklou as Naveen, another investor of Black Rabbit
- Michael Cash as Hunter, Jake and Val's son
- John Ales as Jules Zablonski, a VIP regular at Black Rabbit
- Morgan Spector as Campbell, Jules' fixer
- Hettienne Park as Detective Ellen Seung

== Production ==
The series was announced in 2022 with Zach Baylin and Kate Susman having created for Netflix with Jude Law and Jason Bateman set in the lead roles and executive producers alongside Baylin and Susman.

Executive producers also include Michael Costigan for Aggregate Films, Ben Jackson via Riff Raff Entertainment, Andrew Hinderaker, Zac Frognowski, Justin Levy, David Bernon and Erica Kay. Jason Bateman directed the first two episodes. The rest were directed by Laura Linney, Justin Kurzel and Ben Semanoff.

In March 2024, Cleopatra Coleman was confirmed in the cast alongside Amaka Okafor, Sope Dirisu and Dagmara Dominczyk in unconfirmed roles. Additional casting including Chris Coy, Troy Kotsur, Abbey Lee, Odessa Young, and Robin de Jesús was announced in April.

The series was filmed in New York City between April and September 2024.

== Release ==
Black Rabbit premiered at Toronto International Film Festival on September 7, 2025. It released on Netflix on September 18, 2025.

== Episodes ==
No.	Title	Directed by	Written by	Original release date
1	"The Cyclone"	Jason Bateman	Zach Baylin & Kate Susman	September 18, 2025
In New York City, Jake Friedken celebrates the success of his restaurant, "Black Rabbit," at a private party; he displays expensive jewelry that is on loan for the occasion. The party is robbed by two masked gunmen who are after the jewels, but Jake refuses to give up his own watch, and his friend and investor Wes is wounded as shots are exchanged by the robbers and a security guard. One month earlier, Jake and his head chef Roxie are determined to impress The New York Times food critic, and Jake informs his business partner Naveen of a promising location for another restaurant that he intends to run if Black Rabbit gets a favorable review. In Reno, Jake's brother Vince arranges an under-the-table sale of his late father's rare coins but is robbed instead, and drives over one of the thieves before fleeing. Jake reluctantly flies his brother back to New York to stay with family friend Matt, despite Vince's history with drugs and the financial mess he left as former co-owner of Black Rabbit. Threatened by loan shark Joe Mancuso's henchmen, Vince promises to repay the $140,000 debt he ran out on when he was last in New York through the sale of his late parents' house, but they take his watch as collateral. The restaurant critic's visit is a success, with Vince stepping in for absent bartender Anna, and Jake suggests his brother stay on.
2	"The Black Rabbits"	Jason Bateman	Zach Baylin & Kate Susman	September 18, 2025
Black Rabbit — named by Vince after the brothers' former band — receives a glowing review. Jake enlists his interior designer Estelle, Wes's girlfriend, to plan the new restaurant at the former Four Seasons' Pool Room without Wes's involvement. Vince unsuccessfully attempts to reconnect with his estranged daughter Gen, a tattoo artist. He learns the closing offer on his parents' house is too low to pay off his debt to Mancuso. He asks Wes for some of the money but is turned down. Jake asks his ex-wife Val to invest in his new restaurant but is also refused. Jake asks Wes to pay up his tab at Black Rabbit. Mancuso's son Junior is determined to prove himself by collecting the debt from Vince, who tries to raise the money by gambling at an underground casino. Anna tells chef Roxie that she was raped by restaurant regular Jules, whose inappropriate behavior was ignored by Jake. Having won and lost $150,000 at a blackjack table, Vince is chased down by Junior and his enforcer Babbitt, who cut off his finger and threaten his daughter Gen if Vince fails to pay up. Vince turns to Jake, who meets with Mancuso; having known their late mother, Mancuso agrees to weekly payments of $20,000, but warns that the restaurant will be treated as collateral.
3	"Skin Contact"	Laura Linney	Andrew Hinderaker	September 18, 2025
After Vince's mistakes two years prior landed him in jail and cost the restaurant $500,000, Jake bought him out of his ownership stake in Black Rabbit. Jake promises Roxie to get rid of Jules, and lies to Naveen about a missing $100,000 in their accounting. The brothers arrange a sham charity event to raise the money they need. Having demanded that Jake cut ties with Vince when the scam is done, Roxie is severely disappointed to see Vince re-establishing his position. She is also annoyed to see Jules in attendance and spots Jake kissing Estelle. Vince is confronted by a former employee who blames him for the incident two years earlier that left him a paraplegic. Reviewing security tapes after a host, Mel, overdoses on cocaine given to her by Jules, Jake finds previous footage of Jules drugging Anna's drink, and considers deleting it. The brothers manage to raise almost $120,000, unaware that Babbitt has inserted himself into Gen's life.
4	"No More F**k-Ups"	Laura Linney	Sarah Gubbins	September 18, 2025
Roxie confides in her ex-girlfriend, deciding to fight for her stake in Black Rabbit. Campbell, Jules's fixer, follows Anna as she meets with a reporter. An article is published about Mel's overdose. Jake begins an affair with Estelle and is threatened by Campbell. Vince learns that Jules's bad cocaine came from Matt, while Jake uses most of the money to square his own books, allowing him to proceed with the Pool Room expansion. Jake approaches Anna, who reminds him of his own sexual improprieties and tells him to stay away. When Vince is short on payment, Junior and Babbitt trash Jake's apartment until Vince accidentally tells them about Anna, and they plan to intimidate her into silence to protect Black Rabbit as their collateral. Anna accepts Campbell's offer to start a new life in Mexico, but as he waits outside, Junior and Babbitt enter her apartment. They soon leave, and Campbell returns inside to find Anna dead.
5	"Trailblazer"	Ben Semanoff	Stacy Osei-Kuffour	September 18, 2025
Anna's death is revealed to be an accident, not murder: when Junior and Babbitt forced their way inside, she fatally struck her head. Realizing he has lost Vince's watch, Junior returns to Anna's building but the authorities have already arrived. Roxie suggests to Wes that they buy Jake out, revealing Estelle's infidelity. Vince and Jake reminisce before burning down their parents' house and arranging a sizable insurance payout. Campbell warns Jules, assuming it was he who had Anna killed, and the Friedken family gathers for Jake's son Hunter's birthday. Estelle tells Wes that she is leaving him. Jake dismisses Roxie's plan to take over Black Rabbit. Detective Ellen Seung informs Anna's coworkers of her death. To cover up their visit to Anna, Junior and Babbitt kidnap Jake and Vince and prepare to execute them. In desperation, Jake reveals the restaurant will be hosting a private event with over $1 million in jewelry for Junior and Babbitt to steal. The brothers are cut loose, but angrily go their separate ways.
6	"Attaf**kinboy"	Ben Semanoff	Carlos Rios	September 18, 2025
As children, Jake and Vince were given their beloved counterfeit watches by their father. Jake comes clean to Estelle about Anna and walks Junior and Babbitt through the plan to steal the jewelry from his safe. Holding a memorial for Anna, Jake tells Detective Seung there is no saved security footage. Campbell offers Jake a $500,000 payoff tied to a non-disclosure agreement. Jake brings Mancuso the money and asks to call off the robbery, assuring him Vince has left for good. Wes and Roxie have acquired the Pool Room and convince Jake's partners to sell Black Rabbit out from under him. Roxie and fellow chef Tony report Anna's rape to Seung and Tony discovers the incriminating footage was deleted. Mancuso reprimands Junior and banishes him to Florida. Vince gets a tattoo from Gen before skipping town but he is caught by Junior and forced along on the robbery. With the jewelry already out of the safe, a masked Junior and Vince rob the party at gunpoint but Jake recognizes his brother. Wes, Tony and an armed guard are shot. Vince kills Junior before he can execute Jake and escapes with the jewelry.
7	"These Kids Nearly Got Munsoned"	Justin Kurzel	Zach Baylin & Kate Susman	September 18, 2025
As a child, Vince killed his violent father with a bowling ball to save his mother, who called on Mancuso for help. In the aftermath of the robbery, Vince calls Jake, promising to disappear if he will help Gen. Realizing the entire family is in danger, Jake sends Val and Hunter out of town but Gen refuses to go with them. Jake seeks out Campbell, who advises him to go to the hospital where his staff waits for updates on the critically injured Wes and Tony. Confronted by Roxie about the missing security footage and for leaving the scene, Jake refuses to cooperate with Detective Seung, who later finds Vince's watch at Anna's apartment. Vince delivers the jewelry to Junior's fence but is forced to flee with his cash when Mancuso arrives. Jake nearly reveals everything to Estelle but Babbitt has kidnapped Gen, forcing Jake to meet with Mancuso. On the run, Vince sees on the news that Wes has died.
8	"Isle of Joy"	Justin Kurzel	Zach Baylin & Kate Susman	September 18, 2025
Mancuso forces Jake to call Vince, who reveals he is visiting Matt's bar before leaving town and Gen is set free. Jake races to warn his brother but Mancuso and Babbitt ambush Vince and kill Matt. Revealing that he protected young Vince by staging his father's death as an accident, Mancuso allows him a final request of Scotch and drugs. Vince subdues Babbitt with Matt's cocaine and escapes with Jake, who saved the incriminating footage of Jules and blackmails Campbell into arranging a private plane. With a manhunt for Vince underway, the brothers flee from the police and return to Black Rabbit to retrieve the footage. A guilt-stricken Vince confesses that he killed their father but Jake has known it all along and the brothers forgive each other. Summoning the police and taking the fall for everything, Vince throws himself from the restaurant's roof. Jake gives the footage to Seung and is confronted by Mancuso, who lets him live. After Vince's funeral, Jake apologizes to Estelle before parting ways. Jules is arrested while Roxie and Tony open a new restaurant, "Anna's". With his family safe, Jake closes the Black Rabbit and starts a new life bartending.

== Reception ==
=== Critical response ===
The review aggregator website Rotten Tomatoes reported a 68% approval rating based on 62 critic reviews. The website's critics consensus reads, "Elegantly plated but over-seasoned with grit, Black Rabbit's unrelenting edginess can be off-putting but Jason Bateman and Jude Law's committed performances make for a satiating enough meal." Metacritic, which uses a weighted average, assigned a score of 63 out of 100 based on 24 critics, indicating "generally favorable".

=== Accolades ===
Year (Note: The listed year refers to the date of the ceremony, not necessarily the year in which the corresponding season or episode aired.)	Award	Category	Nominee(s)	Result	Ref.
2026	Actor Awards	Outstanding Performance by a Male Actor in a Television Movie or Limited Series	Jason Bateman	Nominated	
2026	American Society of Cinematographers Awards	Limited or Anthology Series or Motion Picture Made for Television	Pete Konczal (for "Isle of Joy")	Won	
2026	American Society of Cinematographers Awards	Limited or Anthology Series or Motion Picture Made for Television	Igor Martinović (for "Attaf**kinboy")	Nominated	
2026	Art Directors Guild Awards	Excellence in Production Design for a Television Movie or Limited Series	Alex DiGerlando	Nominated	
2026	Directors Guild of America Awards	Limited and Anthology Series	Jason Bateman (for "The Black Rabbits")	Nominated	
2026	Golden Globe Awards	Best Actor – Miniseries or Motion Picture Made for Television	Jude Law	Nominated	
2026	Primetime Emmy Awards	Outstanding Lead Actor in a Limited or Anthology Series or Movie	Jason Bateman	Nominated	
2026	Primetime Creative Arts Emmy Awards	Outstanding Cinematography for a Limited or Anthology Series or Movie	Peter Konczal (for "Isle of Joy")	Nominated	
2026	Primetime Creative Arts Emmy Awards	Outstanding Contemporary Costumes for a Limited or Anthology Series or Movie	Amy Westcott, Min Ji Kim, Jessica Trejos, and Amy Burt (for "The Black Rabbits")	Nominated	
2026	Primetime Creative Arts Emmy Awards	Outstanding Directing for a Limited or Anthology Series or Movie	Jason Bateman (for "The Black Rabbits")	Nominated	
2026	Primetime Creative Arts Emmy Awards	Outstanding Music Composition for a Limited or Anthology Series, Movie, or Special (Original Dramatic Score)	Danny Bensi and Saunder Jurriaans (for "Isle of Joy")	Nominated	
2026	Primetime Creative Arts Emmy Awards	Outstanding Picture Editing for a Limited or Anthology Series or Movie	Vikash Patel (for "Isle of Joy")	Nominated	
2026	Primetime Creative Arts Emmy Awards	Outstanding Sound Mixing for a Limited or Anthology Series or Movie	Larry Benjamin, Tim Hoogenakker, James Weidner, Phil McGowan, Paul Drenning, and Ron Mellegers (for "Isle of Joy")	Nominated	
2026	Producers Guild of America Awards	David L. Wolper Award for Outstanding Producer of Limited or Anthology Series Television	Black Rabbit	Nominated	
2026	Satellite Awards	Best Actor in a Miniseries or Television Film	Jude Law	Nominated	
2026	Writers Guild of America Awards	Limited Series	Zach Baylin, Sarah Gubbins, Kate Susman, Andrew Hinderaker, Stacy Osei-Kuffour, Carlos Rios	Nominated	
