= DTF St. Louis =

2026 American television miniseries

- Promotional poster
- Genre: Dark comedy; Crime drama
- Created by: Steven Conrad
- Written by: Steven Conrad
- Directed by: Steven Conrad
- Starring: Jason Bateman; Linda Cardellini; David Harbour; Richard Jenkins; Joy Sunday; Arlan Ruf; Peter Sarsgaard; Chris Perfetti
- Music by: Alex Wurman
- Opening theme: "Let the Sunshine In" by the 5th Dimension
- Country of origin: United States
- Original language: English
- No. of episodes: 7

Production
- Executive producers: James Lasdun; Michael Nelson; Jennifer Scher; Bruce Terris; Todd Black; Molly Allen; Jason Blumenthal; Steven Hoey; Steve Tisch; Steven Conrad; David Harbour; KC Wenson; Jason Bateman; Michael Costigan
- Producer: Christina M. Fitzgerald
- Cinematography: James Whitaker
- Editors: Kevin D. Ross; Max Koepke; Whitfield Scheidegger
- Running time: 47–58 minutes
- Production companies: Elephant Pictures; Bravo Axolotl; Aggregate Films; Escape Artists; MGM Television

Original release
- Network: HBO
- Release: March 1 – April 12, 2026

DTF St. Louis is an American dark comedy television miniseries created by Steven Conrad for HBO. The series stars Jason Bateman, Linda Cardellini, and David Harbour, and premiered on March 1, 2026. It received positive reviews and 7 wins at the 78th Primetime Emmy Awards, including for Outstanding Limited or Anthology Series, as well as acting wins for Cardellini and Harbour.

== Premise ==
The seven-part series is about a love triangle between three adults experiencing middle-age malaise, which leads to one of them ending up dead. Two detectives investigate and learn the crime is connected to a dating app called "DTF St. Louis", which enables married couples to have affairs. The series is presented in a nonlinear narrative, with episodes often revisiting previous scenes to reveal their place in the overall chronology of events.

== Cast and characters ==
=== Main ===
- Jason Bateman as Clark Forrest, a weatherman
- Linda Cardellini as Carol Love-Smernitch, Floyd's wife
- David Harbour as Floyd Smernitch, an American Sign Language interpreter
- Richard Jenkins as Detective Donoghue Homer, a county detective
- Joy Sunday as Jodie Plumb, a special crimes officer from the Twyla police department
- Arlan Ruf as Richard, Carol's son and Floyd's stepson
- Peter Sarsgaard as Christopher Spurce / "Modern Love", a man Floyd meets on the DTF St. Louis app
- Chris Perfetti as Kevin Van Der Lonse / "Tiger Tiger", a man Clark tries to hire to pretend to be "Tiger Tiger"

=== Recurring ===
- Wynn Everett as Eimy Forrest, Clark's wife
- Aizley Ford as Anabel, Clark's daughter
- Maddyn Kendall as Genevieve, Clark's daughter
- Asher Miles Fallica as Stephen Queece
- Chastity Dotson as Clara Gilchrist

=== Guest ===
- Chris Conrad as Bob Dalt
- Todrick Hall as himself

== Production ==
The seven-part series has Steven Conrad as the series writer, showrunner, executive producer, and director. It started development in 2022 with David Harbour and Pedro Pascal attached to star and executive produce, and was originally inspired by the 2017 James Lasdun article in The New Yorker entitled "My Dentist's Murder Trial: Adultery, False Identities, and a Lethal Sedation".

However, in October 2024, it was announced that Pascal was no longer involved and the creative direction of the series had evolved into a wholly original idea with no connection to the original article, with Jason Bateman joining the series to star alongside Harbour and serve as an executive producer for Aggregate Films. Additional executive producers include James Lasdun, as well as Todd Black, Jason Blumenthal and Steve Tisch for Escape Artists, Molly Allen, Bruce Terris, and Michael Costigan for Aggregate Films, Kristina Wenson for Bravo Axolotl, and MGM Television.

Linda Cardellini joined the cast in December 2024. Richard Jenkins and Arlan Ruf joined the cast in January 2025. Chris Perfetti and Joy Sunday were added to the cast in February.

The main story takes place in Twyla, Missouri, a fictional suburb of St. Louis. A city website was created by the show's production designers, and follows along with the timeline of Floyd's death, and subsequent investigation.

Filming took place in Atlanta, Georgia, in May 2025. The first trailer showed locations in Cumming and Johns Creek, Georgia.

== Episodes ==
| No. | Title | Directed by | Written by | Original release date |
|---|---|---|---|---|
| 1 | "Cornhole" | Steven Conrad | Steven Conrad | March 1, 2026 |
In 2018, Floyd Smernitch is a sign language interpreter who lives with his wife Carol and her troubled teenage son Richard. During a televised storm report, he protects meteorologist Clark Forrest from being injured, and the two quickly become close friends. At a family get-together, Clark tells Floyd about DTF St. Louis, an app for married people to have affairs. Both men confess that their marital sex lives are not going well. Eventually, Floyd agrees to meet Clark to set up their profiles on the app. Weeks later, Floyd's dead body is found inside the local community pool house. Detective Donoghue Homer and special crimes officer Jodie Plumb disagree over the evidence and their theories about Floyd's death. Plumb obtains surveillance footage capturing a recumbent bicycle leaving the scene and identifies Clark as the likely owner. Homer questions Clark, who denies being at the scene, and seizes his phone as potential evidence. Homer discovers through Clark's texts that he had been having an affair with Carol for several months but became obsessed when she ended it. The toxicology report reveals that Floyd was poisoned. Homer and his deputies arrive at the news station and arrest Clark during a live weather report.
| 2 | "Snag It" | Steven Conrad | Steven Conrad | March 8, 2026 |
Clark and Carol begin an affair after a series of flirtatious encounters lead them to arrange secret sexual trysts that Carol calls "dream meetings", in which they act out each other's sexual fantasies. During a concert for which Floyd is interpreting, Carol is unexpectedly moved by his energetic performance and tells Clark she wants to remain with Floyd. Clark nevertheless grows closer to Floyd, which is when he introduces him to the DTF St. Louis app. Floyd later agrees to meet a user named "Tiger Tiger", leading to his poisoning. In the present, Homer traces the "Tiger Tiger" account to Clark's IP address and credit card, and charges him with Floyd's murder, informing Clark that the prosecution intends to seek the death penalty. Plumb later examines Floyd's belongings and discovers multiple copies of a Playgirl magazine matching one found at the crime scene, depicting a nude male model dressed as Indiana Jones. Homer believes Floyd brought the magazine page to sexually arouse himself prior to meeting "Tiger Tiger", but Plumb learns from Carol that Floyd himself is the model in the photos. Plumb tells Homer she believes Carol is lying about Clark instigating their affair. Clark calls his wife from jail and admits to having an affair with Carol, though he insists he did not kill Floyd.
| 3 | "The Go Getter" | Steven Conrad | Steven Conrad | March 15, 2026 |
Clark and Carol's affair intensifies; Carol tells Clark about her dissatisfaction with her marriage and describes Floyd's financial problems, including debt and limited income from his work as an interpreter. Clark is later revealed to have set up Floyd's life insurance policy; Carol tells him Floyd must never know about it. Floyd matches with a user named "Modern Love" on the DTF St. Louis app and arranges a date, only to learn that the user is a man. He nevertheless has breakfast with him and lets the man kiss him, later telling Clark that they engaged in more intimate foreplay that Floyd allowed to avoid hurting the man's feelings. Floyd also spends time with his stepson Richard and bonds with him during a visit to a skate park. In the present, Clark tells Homer and Plumb that he loved Floyd and would not harm him. When the detectives present a key connected to the investigation, Clark stops answering their questions and requests a lawyer. Later, Carol reassures Richard that they will be financially secure after Floyd's death.
| 4 | "Missouri Mutual Life & Health Insurance Company" | Steven Conrad | Steven Conrad | March 22, 2026 |
| 5 | "Amphezyne" | Steven Conrad | Steven Conrad | March 29, 2026 |
Floyd reveals to Clark that he has been aware of his affair with Carol for some time, and instead of being angry, asks to participate as a voyeur during their trysts at the Quality Garden Suites Hotel. Later, Floyd confides in Clark more about his sexual dysfunction and asks him to get a prescription for the (fictional) male enhancement drug amphezyne so he may perform again with Carol, since he cannot get one himself due to his condition. Clark reluctantly agrees and warns Floyd to be careful using it. Floyd proposes to Carol that Clark be there to watch once he is able to perform with her again, indicating a polyamorous shift in their relationship. In the present, Plumb learns from the hotel manager while investigating Clark and Carol's activity that the pair would occasionally arrive with Floyd in tow as a "threesome". Carol feigns ignorance to the existence of Floyd's life insurance policy while being questioned by Homer and Plumb, and inadvertently reveals that she has a past sealed criminal conviction, but invokes her right to withhold any details about it as her record is sealed. Homer and Plumb grow suspicious of Carol and serve her a search warrant, finding Clark's second bike in her garage. Homer suggests they find Carol's past conviction through indirect means.
| 6 | "The Denny's Plan" | Steven Conrad | Steven Conrad | April 5, 2026 |
Carol struggles to enjoy having sex with Floyd, leading him into a deep depression. To cheer him up, Clark creates a fake profile on DTF St. Louis named "Tiger Tiger" and connects with Floyd. Clark is surprised when Floyd says he wants to meet "Tiger Tiger", since Clark intentionally created a male profile assuming Floyd would not engage but instead enjoy the validation. To perpetuate the farce, Clark attempts to pay a homosexual man to pose as "Tiger Tiger" to meet Floyd and achieve an erection for him, who initially agrees. However, the man follows Clark one day while at the park with Floyd and cancels the meetup after seeing Floyd and deciding he could not be aroused by him. In the present, Clark is more forthcoming with Homer and Plumb against his attorney's advice, but appears ignorant as to who Floyd would be meeting at the pool house if it was not "Tiger Tiger".
| 7 | "No One's Normal. It Just Looks That Way from Across the Street" | Steven Conrad | Steven Conrad | April 12, 2026 |

== Release ==
The series premiered on HBO on March 1, 2026.

== Reception ==
=== Critical response ===
The review aggregator website Rotten Tomatoes reported an 89% approval rating, based on 55 critic reviews, with an average rating of 7.5/10. The website's critics consensus reads: "Steve Conrad zeroes in on the crossroads between the suburbanite mundane and insane with this sly yet telling crime thriller that boasts strong performances by David Harbour, Linda Cardellini, and Jason Bateman." Metacritic, which uses a weighted average, assigned a score of 71 out of 100, based on 22 critics, indicating "generally favorable" reviews.

=== Accolades ===
| Award | Date of ceremony | Category | Recipient(s) | Result | Ref. |
|---|---|---|---|---|---|
| Astra TV Awards | August 15, 2026 | Best Limited Series | DTF St. Louis | Nominated | |
| Astra TV Awards | August 15, 2026 | Best Supporting Actor in a Limited Series or TV Movie | Jason Bateman | Nominated | |
| Astra TV Awards | August 15, 2026 | Best Supporting Actor in a Limited Series or TV Movie | David Harbour | Nominated | |
| Astra TV Awards | August 15, 2026 | Best Supporting Actress in a Limited Series or TV Movie | Linda Cardellini | Won | |
| Astra TV Awards | August 15, 2026 | Best Directing in a Limited Series or TV Movie | Steven Conrad | Nominated | |
| Astra TV Awards | August 15, 2026 | Best Writing in a Limited Series or TV Movie | Steven Conrad | Nominated | |
| Black Reel TV Awards | August 17, 2026 | Outstanding Supporting Performance in a TV Movie or Limited Series | Joy Sunday | Nominated | |
| Dorian TV Awards | August 15, 2026 | Best TV Movie or Limited Series | DTF St. Louis | Nominated | |
| Gotham TV Awards | June 1, 2026 | Outstanding Limited or Anthology Series | Steven Conrad, Molly Allen, Jason Bateman, Todd Black, Jason Blumenthal, Michael Costigan, David Harbour, James Lasdun, Michael Nelson, Jennifer Scher, Bruce Terris, Steve Tisch, and K.C. Wenson | Won | |
| Gotham TV Awards | June 1, 2026 | Outstanding Supporting Performance in a Limited or Anthology Series | Linda Cardellini | Nominated | |
| Gotham TV Awards | June 1, 2026 | Outstanding Supporting Performance in a Limited or Anthology Series | David Harbour | Won | |
| Humanitas Prize | September 9, 2026 | Limited Series Teleplay | Steven Conrad (for "No One's Normal. It Just Looks That Way from Across the Street") | Nominated | |
| MacGuffin Awards | September 12, 2026 | Television Miniseries | Katrina Rice | Nominated | |
| Primetime Emmy Awards | September 14, 2026 | Outstanding Limited or Anthology Series | Jason Bateman, Michael Costigan, David Harbour, KC Wenson, Steven Conrad, Todd Black, Molly Allen, Jason Blumenthal, Steve Tisch, Bruce Terris, Jennifer Scher, Michael Nelson, James Lasdun, Taylor Latham, and Christina M. Fitzgerald | Won | |
| Primetime Creative Arts Emmy Awards | September 5–6, 2026 | Outstanding Supporting Actor in a Limited or Anthology Series or Movie | Jason Bateman (for "No One's Normal. It Just Looks That Way from Across the Street") | Nominated | |
| Primetime Creative Arts Emmy Awards | September 5–6, 2026 | Outstanding Supporting Actor in a Limited or Anthology Series or Movie | David Harbour (for "Amphezyne") | Won | |
| Primetime Creative Arts Emmy Awards | September 5–6, 2026 | Outstanding Supporting Actor in a Limited or Anthology Series or Movie | Richard Jenkins (for "No One's Normal. It Just Looks That Way from Across the Street") | Nominated | |
| Primetime Creative Arts Emmy Awards | September 5–6, 2026 | Outstanding Supporting Actress in a Limited or Anthology Series or Movie | Linda Cardellini (for "Missouri Mutual Life & Health Insurance Company") | Won | |
| Primetime Creative Arts Emmy Awards | September 5–6, 2026 | Outstanding Supporting Actress in a Limited or Anthology Series or Movie | Joy Sunday (for "No One's Normal. It Just Looks That Way from Across the Street") | Nominated | |
| Primetime Creative Arts Emmy Awards | September 5–6, 2026 | Outstanding Directing for a Limited or Anthology Series or Movie | Steven Conrad | Won | |
| Primetime Creative Arts Emmy Awards | September 5–6, 2026 | Outstanding Writing for a Limited or Anthology Series or Movie | Steven Conrad | Won | |
| Primetime Creative Arts Emmy Awards | September 5–6, 2026 | Outstanding Casting for a Limited or Anthology Series or Movie | Francine Maisler, Amber Wakefield, Molly Rose, Chase Paris, and Tara Feldstein | Nominated | |
| Primetime Creative Arts Emmy Awards | September 5–6, 2026 | Outstanding Cinematography for a Limited or Anthology Series or Movie | James Whitaker (for "Cornhole") | Won | |
| Primetime Creative Arts Emmy Awards | September 5–6, 2026 | Outstanding Contemporary Costumes for a Limited or Anthology Series or Movie | Molly Maginnis, Nadia Durham, and Brenda Maben (for "Cornhole") | Nominated | |
| Primetime Creative Arts Emmy Awards | September 5–6, 2026 | Outstanding Picture Editing for a Limited or Anthology Series or Movie | Kevin D. Ross and Max Koepke (for "No One's Normal. It Just Looks That Way from Across the Street") | Won | |
| Primetime Creative Arts Emmy Awards | September 5–6, 2026 | Outstanding Sound Mixing for a Limited or Anthology Series or Movie | John W. Cook II, James Parnell, Akira Fukasawa, Fernanda Domene, James Howe, and Alex Wurman (for "Amphezyne") | Nominated | |
| TCA Awards | August 20, 2026 | Outstanding Achievement in Movies, Miniseries or Specials | DTF St. Louis | Nominated | |
| TCA Awards | August 20, 2026 | Individual Achievement in Drama | David Harbour | Nominated | |
