= The Marriage Plot (miniseries) =

Upcoming American drama miniseries

- Genre: Drama
- Created by: Will Arbery
- Based on: The Marriage Plot by Jeffrey Eugenides
- Directed by: Hiro Murai
- Starring: Sadie Sink
- Country of origin: United States
- Original language: English

Production
- Executive producers: Will Arbery; Hiro Murai; Steven Prinz; Rachel Jacobs; Michael Costigan; Jason Bateman; Jeffrey Eugenides; Sadie Sink; Carver Karaszewski; Claudia Shin
- Producer: Yiyi Huang
- Production companies: Borderless Pictures; Aggregate Films; Chum Films; A24; FX Productions

Original release
- Network: FX; FX on Hulu

The Marriage Plot is an upcoming American television drama miniseries created by Will Arbery for FX. It is based on Jeffrey Eugenides' 2011 novel of the same name.

== Premise ==
The Marriage Plot follows three recent college graduates caught in an all-consuming love triangle as they reconcile their youthful romantic aspirations with looming adulthood and make life-altering choices about love and identity.

— Deadline Hollywood

== Cast ==
- Sadie Sink

== Production ==
=== Development ===
On June 4, 2026, it was announced that FX had greenlit a limited series adaptation of Jeffrey Eugenides' 2011 novel The Marriage Plot from playwright Will Arbery, who is set to write and executive produce alongside Hiro Murai, who is set to direct, Steven Prinz and Rachel Jacobs of Borderless Pictures; Michael Costigan and Jason Bateman of Aggregate Films, Eugenides, who wrote the original novel, Sadie Sink, and Carver Karaszewski and Claudia Shin of Chum Films with Yiyi Huang as producer. It is produced by A24 and FX Productions.

=== Casting ===
Alongside the series order, it was also announced that Sink will also star in the series in addition to executive producing.
