= South Forsyth High School =

Public high school in Cumming, Georgia, United States

Coordinates: 34°8′51.55″N 84°10′19.82″W

Location
- 585 Peachtree Parkway; Cumming, Georgia; United States

Information
- Type: Public school
- Motto: Connect to Achieve; Lead to Inspire.
- Established: 1989
- Principal: Pam Bibik
- Teaching staff: 129.70 (FTE)
- Grades: 9-12
- Gender: Co-ed
- Enrollment: 2,508 (2023-2024)
- Student to teacher ratio: 19.34
- Campus size: 10 acres
- Colors: Royal blue, silver, black, and white
- Mascot: Wilson the War Eagle
- National ranking: 315 (national), 8 (state)
- Affiliation: Forsyth County Schools
- Website: South Forsyth High School

South Forsyth High School is a public high school, built in 1989, located in Cumming, Georgia, a suburb northeast of Atlanta. It is one of eight public high schools in the Forsyth County School District, and serves students who live in parts of unincorporated Cumming. In 2023, South Forsyth High School was ranked number 276 on US News' "Best High Schools Ranking". The school has been given an "A" rating and Platinum status by the Governor's Office of Student Achievement for more than five years. South Forsyth High School has offered the International Baccalaureate Diploma Programme and the Career-Related Programme since 2000 and 2012, respectively.

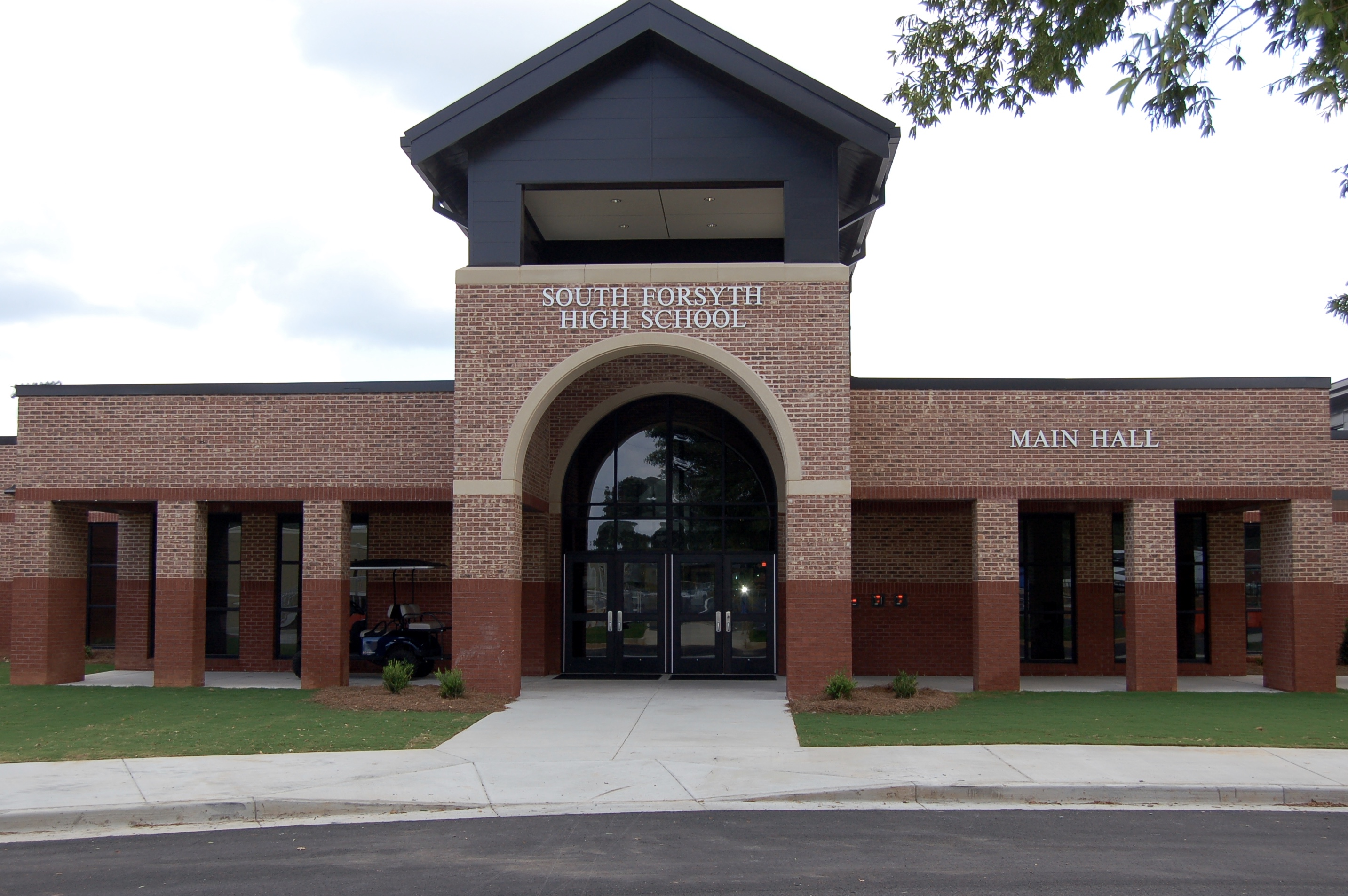
Main Hall at South Forsyth High School opened in July 2016.

== History ==
South Forsyth High School first opened in 1989 as both a middle and high school, named South Forsyth Junior High. An additional building, East Hall, was later added to allow the high school and middle school to operate separately. In 1998, a new middle school, South Forsyth Middle School, was built on a separate property, allowing the high school to utilize the entire campus. After this, students were moved from Forsyth County High, now Forsyth Central High School, to alleviate overcrowding. Eventually, South Forsyth High School experienced its own overcrowding, which prompted the construction and opening of West Forsyth High School in 2007, Lambert High School in 2009, and Denmark High School in 2018.

=== Renovations ===
As a result of district-wide overcrowding at all of the middle schools, such as Lakeside Middle School, Piney Grove Middle School, and South Forsyth Middle School, a $195 million bond referendum was passed, which included significant improvements to South Forsyth High School. These included a new cafeteria, a new 42,000 square foot competition gym, improved traffic flow, a new administration center, 23 new classrooms, a new front façade, and a new courtyard in front of East Hall featuring walkways to connect the several separate buildings on campus. The renovations were designed by Manley Spangler Smith Architects. Balfour Beatty was selected as the construction manager, with a maximum of $25.7 million budgeted for the project. In July 2016, the new additions were opened to the public. The new additions include administrative offices, nine new classrooms, a large dining hall, a competition style gym, and the South Forsyth Plaza.

=== 1990 hostage stand-off ===
On September 7, 1990, Randy Floyd Addis entered the school with a rifle, a shotgun and a semi-automatic pistol. After a teacher wrestled the rifle away from him, he used the pistol to hold many of his classmates hostage. Most of the students were released over the course of the morning. In the early afternoon, Floyd became dizzy and gave himself up, releasing the final nine students after five hours. No one was injured. U.S. representative Marjorie Taylor Greene referenced this incident in a 2021 speech on the House floor in support of gun rights.

== Athletics ==
South Forsyth currently competes in Region 6-AAAAAAA (Area 3 AAAAAAA for lacrosse),← and has since 2012. SFHS has seven varsity sports for boys and girls. The school fields junior varsity teams for most sports and freshmen teams in football and volleyball. The school is a member of the Georgia High School Association.

The school has won state championships in competition cheerleading in 1997, 1998, 1999 and 2000, girls' cross country in 2016, boys’ cross country 2018, and men's quartet in 2009.

== Other studies ==
South Forsyth High School offers a fairly wide selection of Advanced Placement (AP), and International Baccalaureate (IB) accredited classes. South Forsyth is currently the only school in the Forsyth County School District to offer the IB program. South Forsyth also offers other study alternatives, including work-based learning and dual enrollment. The former allows students to work during part of the day for a variety of companies, while the latter allows students to take college classes for both college and high school credit at either the Lanier Technical College, University of North Georgia (UNG), Georgia State University, or Georgia Institute of Technology. South Forsyth also has world languages, such as Spanish, French, etc. They also have IB and AP Spanish and French. Through the Move On When Ready program, some students take all their classes at a college (typically UNG) and never come to South Forsyth's campus, save for the occasional counselor visit.

Additionally, the school offers distance learning courses in association with the Georgia Institute of Technology in courses such as Intro Computer Science, Intro to Object Oriented Programming, Linear Algebra, Multivariable Calculus, Applied Combinatorics, and Differential Equations for students who have met the requirements.

== Marching band ==
The South Forsyth War Eagle Marching Band is an extracurricular program in which band students can join and perform. The current director of all South Forsyth Bands is Nathaniel Hughes. It consists of roughly 150 members who specialize in wind instruments, percussion, and color guard. The program's past shows include the following: K The Phenomenon (2020), Dies Irae (2021), Medusa (2022), [IM]PERFECT (2023), Web of Shadows (2024), Element 79 (2025), and their current show, On Time (2026). They have been awarded the title of superior at various marching band competitions, as well as the titles of grand champion and recipient of the Randall Coleman Award for Musical Excellence for their show Dies Irae at the White Columns Invitational in Milton, Georgia, as well as scoring highly at Music for All Affiliate Shows. The marching band has also attended and performed at the Bands of America (BOA) Ballad Health East Tennessee Regional 2024 in Johnson City, Tennessee, on October 19, 2024.

== Student data ==
Students are drawn from Piney Grove Middle School, Lakeside Middle School, and South Forsyth Middle School. South currently serves students in grades 9-12. Students can also ask to transfer to South from other schools to participate in the competitive IB program.

=== Demographics ===
During the 2023–24 school year, South Forsyth had an enrollment of 2,508 students, with 1,264 male and 1,244 female students. The student body was 43.8% Asian, 41.5% White, 7.5% Hispanic, 2.6% Black, 4.0% Multiracial, and 0.6% American Indian or Native Alaskan.

== Notable alumni ==
- Zac Brown: founder and leader of the Zac Brown Band
- Jalen Camp: NFL wide receiver
- Billy Magnussen: actor
- Ryann Redmond: actress and singer
- Ruwa Romman: Georgia state representative and 2026 gubernatorial candidate
- Chris Rowley: MLB pitcher
- Landon Sims: MLB draftee
- Marjorie Taylor Greene (née Taylor): congresswoman from Georgia's 14th congressional district
- Mackenzie Lintz: Actor in The Hunger Games, Under the Dome and Love, Simon
- Megan Lawless: Actor in Obsession and The Hate U Give
