= The Marriage Plot =

2011 novel by Jeffrey Eugenides

- First edition cover
- Author: Jeffrey Eugenides
- Cover artist: Rodrigo Corral
- Language: English
- Genre: Campus novel
- Publisher: Farrar, Straus and Giroux
- Publication date: 2011
- Publication place: United States
- Media type: Print (hardcover and paperback)
- Pages: 406
- ISBN: 978-0374203054

The Marriage Plot is a 2011 novel by American writer Jeffrey Eugenides. The novel grew out of a manuscript that Eugenides began after the publication of his Pulitzer Prize-winning novel, Middlesex. Eugenides has stated that he worked on the novel for about five or six years, and that portions are loosely based on his collegiate and post-collegiate experiences. The book is both a realist story about marriage and a commentary on the kind of story it tells.

The novel was well received by many critics, and was featured on year-end best of 2011 lists.

== Summary ==
The story focuses on three college friends from Brown University — Madeleine Hanna, Leonard Bankhead, and Mitchell Grammaticus — beginning in their senior year, 1982, and subsequently follows them during their first year post-graduation.

== Characters ==
- Madeleine Hanna: An English major at Brown University and the daughter of affluent parents. During the course of the novel she is concerned with the writing of her undergraduate thesis, which revolves around the concept of "the marriage plot" in the 19th century novel. She is also ensnared in a love triangle of sorts with her classmates, Leonard Bankhead and Mitchell Grammaticus.
- Leonard Bankhead: A Biology major with a side interest in Philosophy, who quickly becomes Madeleine's paramour. Following graduation Madeleine and Leonard move to Cape Cod where Leonard takes up postgraduate work at a biology lab. It is also noted that Leonard has bipolar disorder and this informs many of his actions and thought processes throughout.
- Mitchell Grammaticus: A Religious Studies major who spends the majority of the novel lusting after spiritual truth and Madeleine. Following graduation, Mitchell and his classmate, Larry, embark on a lengthy tour of Europe and India.

== Development ==
Eugenides began the novel after the publication of his novel Middlesex. He intended to write a “more tightly dramatized” novel than Middlesex, taking place over a year or several years, rather than 70. Originally, the plot concerned a debutante party, or a large family reunion, but after writing about the arrival of a daughter Madeleine to the party, he changed the plot to focus on her and her education.

Certain aspects of the novel are autobiographical. Mitchell, like Eugenides, is Greek, was raised in Detroit, carried a briefcase in college, and traveled to India after his graduation. Eugenides has said that certain traits of Madeleine and Leonard are also drawn from his experience and personality. Eugenides chose to set the novel at Brown, his alma mater, after choosing not to set it at a fictional college, saying that it would have been "too much trouble for what it was worth".

There is some debate as to whether the character Leonard is based on the author David Foster Wallace. Although Eugenides and Wallace were not friends, both were acquainted with Jonathan Franzen. Critics have pointed out that both Leonard and Wallace wear a bandana, have long hair, chew tobacco, study philosophy, and struggled with mental illness. Furthermore, both the character and Wallace had an interest in time and the passage of time and at least some of Leonard's dialogue appears to have been directly lifted from an article about Wallace. Eugenides has denied that the character is based on Wallace and cited two inspirations for the bandana: that the practice was fairly common among his friends at Brown, and that he was basing Leonard off of "Guns N' Roses and heavy metal guys".

== Literary connections ==
An oft-quoted work in the novel, particularly by Madeleine, is Roland Barthes' 1977 book A Lover's Discourse: Fragments.

== Reception ==
=== Honors and awards ===
The Guardian, Salon, NPR, and The Washington Post considered the novel to be one of the best books of 2011.

It also received the 2011 Salon Book Award for Fiction and was featured on the Library Journal Best Books of the Year list.

=== Critical reception ===
In The New York Times Book Review, William Deresiewicz wrote, "'The Marriage Plot' is a new departure...intimate in tone and scale.... It’s about what Eugenides’s books are always about, no matter how they differ: the drama of coming of age.... It possesses the texture and pain of lived experience." C. Romano called it "the most entertaining campus novel since Wolfe's I Am Charlotte Simmons."

However, reviews of the novel were not without criticism; Eleanor Barkhorn, writing for The Atlantic, praised the heroine Madeleine as "smart" and in many other ways realistic, but nonetheless criticized the novel for its lack of "believability" in depicting a modern female character whose "relationships [with almost all other women] are characterized more by spite than affection". Barkhorn noted that the book is not unique in this manner, making reference to the Bechdel Test and stating that The Marriage Plot was a prime example of the storytelling trend the Test criticizes: "[t]here are countless other Madeleines in modern-day literature and film: smart, self-assured women who have all the trappings of contemporary womanhood except a group of friends to confide in".

== Television adaptation ==
In June 2026, FX ordered the series adaptation of the same name, starring Sadie Sink. The series is set to premiere on FX and FX on Hulu. The project hails from writer Will Arbery and director Hiro Murai. Sink, Arbery and Murai serve as executive producers along with Steven Prinz and Rachel Jacobs for Borderless Pictures, Michael Costigan and Jason Bateman for Aggregate Films, Carver Karaszewski and Claudia Shin for Chum Films, and the author of the novel Jeffrey Eugenides. Yiyi Huang serves as producer. The series is produced by A24 and FX Productions.
