= Curry Barker =

American filmmaker and YouTuber (born 1999)

- Barker in 2026
- Born: September 22, 1999 (age 27); Mobile, Alabama, U.S.
- Occupations: Director; producer; screenwriter; editor; actor; comedian; YouTuber
- Years active: 2017–present

YouTube information
- Channel: that's a bad idea
- Genres: Sketch comedy; cringe comedy; horror comedy
- Subscribers: 1.72 million
- Views: 878 million
- Last updated: November 1, 2026

Curry Barker (born September 22, 1999) is an American filmmaker, actor, comedian, and YouTuber. He is known for creating and starring on the sketch comedy YouTube channel "that's a bad idea" with his creative partner Cooper Tomlinson. Barker directed, wrote, and acted in the horror films Milk & Serial (2024), Obsession (2025), and Anything but Ghosts (2027). His film Obsession grossed over $524 million worldwide, making it one of the highest-grossing independent films of all time.

== Early life ==
Barker was born on September 22, 1999, and grew up in Mobile, Alabama. His mother is a graphic designer, and his father was a psychiatric nurse practitioner who later became a professional screenwriter. He has two brothers named Riley and Jeffrey, both of whom have collaborated on his films.

In a 2026 interview, he stated that he had an interest in horror from a young age, noting that his viewing of The Texas Chainsaw Massacre (2003) when he was 11 years old led him to want to chase the feeling of being shocked. A self-described "straight-C and -D student", Barker participated in the marching band, had his own rock band, and ran a YouTube channel with friends. He attended Baker High School.

== Career ==
Comedy duo "that's a bad idea" Barker (left) and Cooper Tomlinson at the 2025 Toronto International Film Festival

Aspiring to be an actor, Barker left home at age 18 to study at the New York Film Academy (NYFA) campus in Los Angeles. During his first week, he met fellow student Cooper Tomlinson, and they soon began making videos together on YouTube, which they described as "our film school outside of film school", forming the sketch comedy duo "that's a bad idea". (Note: Stylized in lower case) Barker and Tomlinson soon dropped out, moved in together, and began publishing comedy sketches and short films on YouTube and TikTok, while Barker worked at Starbucks. Barker had occasional acting roles in other productions, including guest appearances in television series Dave and It's Always Sunny in Philadelphia in 2023.

Barker spent several years on various short films. In 2023, Barker wrote and directed the horror short film The Chair and uploaded it to YouTube, where it was watched more than 10 million times. Film producer James Harris of Tea Shop Productions contacted Barker, suggesting he adapt it into a feature. Barker refused, and instead pitched Harris the story that would become Obsession (2025). The following year, Barker directed and released Milk & Serial (2024), a found footage horror film made with about $800. After spending a year trying to get distribution, Barker ultimately decided to release the full film on YouTube. The film went viral, leading to a representation deal with United Talent Agency in early 2025.

On September 3, 2025, in advance of Obsession's Toronto International Film Festival (TIFF) premiere, it was announced that Barker would direct and co-write his third feature horror film, Anything but Ghosts, and co-star in it. The project is produced by Jason Blum, Roy Lee, and Steven Schneider through their Blumhouse Atomic and Spooky Pictures banners, respectively, alongside Divide/Conquer. The film is set to be released by Focus Features on May 7, 2027.

Made on a $750,000 budget, Obsession became a worldwide sensation, grossing over $500 million globally. TheWrap compared Barker and Kane Parsons, whose film Backrooms was released and gained success at the same time as Obsession, to Swedish filmmaker David F. Sandberg, since all three filmmakers began by creating YouTube videos before directing Hollywood feature films.

In April 2026, it was announced that Barker would be writing and directing a reboot of The Texas Chain Saw Massacre with A24.

In June 2026, it was announced that Barker would be writing, directing, and producing an original horror film for Universal Pictures. Blum, James Wan, Lee, Schneider, Adam Hendricks and Greg Gilreath will produce through their Blumhouse Atomic, Spooky Pictures and Divide/Conquer banners, respectively.

In September 2026, Barker was named on the TIME100 Next 2026: The World's Most Influential Rising Stars list.

== Filmography ==
Key
†	Denotes film or television show still in production

=== Feature film ===
Year	Title	Director	Writer	Producer	Editor	Actor	Role	Ref.
2024	Milk & Serial	Yes	Yes	Yes	Yes	Yes	Marshall "Milk"	
2025	Obsession	Yes	Yes	No	Yes	Yes	One Wish Willow customer service representative	
2027	Anything but Ghosts †	Yes	Yes	Executive	Yes	Yes	Mouse	

=== Short film ===
Year	Title	Director	Writer	Producer	Editor	Actor	Role	Notes	Ref.
2019	Real World	Yes	Yes	Yes	Yes	Yes	Rivers Rivera		
2020	Contemplation	Yes	Yes	Yes	Yes	Yes	Greg		
2020	We Don't Feel Pain!! (we tried a ritual)	Yes	Yes	Yes	Yes	Yes	Himself		
2020	Meanwhile Outside the Bank	Yes	Yes	Yes	Yes	Yes	Ryan		
2021	Drywall	Yes	Yes	Yes	Yes	Yes	David		
2022	Heavy Eyes	Yes	Yes	Yes	Yes	Yes	Seth		
2022	The Cowboy with No Hat	No	No	No	No	Yes	Andre Curtis		
2023	Warnings	Yes	Yes	Yes	Yes	Yes	Seán / Kyle		
2023	Enigma	Yes	Yes	Yes	Yes	Yes	Mikey		
2023	The Chair	Yes	Yes	Yes	Yes	No	—N/a		
2023	I Can't Cry	No	Yes	No	No	Yes	Justin		
2024	Striking Gold	Yes	Yes	Yes	Yes	Yes	Jimmy the Bartender	Also titled Western Town	
2025	Fly Me to the Earth	No	Yes	Yes	Yes	Yes	Cotton Weary		
2025	The Chip Thief	No	No	No	No	Yes	Officer Barker		
2026	Mama Bear	Yes	Yes	No	Yes	No			

=== Television ===
Year	Title	Role	Notes
2023	Dave	Seymore Tamzarian	Episode: "Rebirthday"
2023	It's Always Sunny in Philadelphia	Joey McPoyle	Episode: "Risk E. Rat's Pizza and Amusement Center"

=== Web series ===
Year	Title	Role	Notes
2017–present	That's a Bad Idea	Various, himself	Sketch comedy YouTube channel

=== Music video ===
Year	Title	Director	Writer	Producer	Editor	Actor	Singer	Role	Ref.
2024	"That's a Bad Idea"	Yes	Yes	Yes	Yes	Yes	Yes	Himself	
2026	"C.E.O."	No	No	No	No	Yes	No	Music Video Director / Himself	

== That's A Bad Idea,LLC ==
That's a bad idea
- Genre: Sketch comedy Horror; Black Comedy
- Founded: 2017
- Founder: Curry Barker; Cooper Tomlinson
- Services: Film Production|Content Creation

That's A Bad Idea(simply Bad Idea) is the Youtube channel and production company founded by Curry Barker and Cooper Tomlinson. They made short horror movies and now they are producing Anything but Ghosts, a movie with Roy Lee and Steven Schneider under Spooky Pictures label and Jason Blum under the Blumhouse Atomic label as producers.
