= The Cackling of the Dodos =

- Directed by: Jason Bateman
- Written by: Rye Curtis
- Produced by: Michael Costigan; Jason Bateman; Mark Berger; Anna Schwartz; Elise Konialian; Jeremy Plager
- Starring: Sam Rockwell; Woody Harrelson; Fred Hechinger; Michael McKean; Esther McGregor; Jenn Lyon; Emy Coligado
- Production companies: Aggregate Films; Children at Play in the Attic Productions; Untitled Entertainment
- Distributed by: Netflix
- Country: United States
- Language: English

The Cackling of the Dodos is an upcoming American comedy crime thriller film directed and produced by Jason Bateman and written by Rye Curtis. It stars Sam Rockwell, Woody Harrelson, Fred Hechinger, Michael McKean, Esther McGregor, Jenn Lyon, and Emy Coligado.

== Cast ==
- Sam Rockwell as George
- Woody Harrelson as Denny
- Fred Hechinger
- Michael McKean
- Esther McGregor
- Jenn Lyon
- Emy Coligado

== Production ==
In March 2026, it was announced during a Netflix press event that Jason Bateman would direct the film based from an original screenplay by novelist Rye Curtis and produce along with Michael Costigan under their Aggregate Films banner, with Sam Rockwell and Woody Harrelson were set to star. In May, Fred Hechinger, Michael McKean, Esther McGregor, Jenn Lyon, and Emy Coligado were also added to the cast with Hechinger landing a key role.

Filming began on June 1, and had wrapped a month later on July 12, 2026, after six weeks of shooting in Cranford, New Jersey.

== Release ==
The film is set to be released on Netflix.
