= Outlast (TV series) =

American TV reality series

- Streaming release poster
- Genre: Reality competition
- Showrunner: Mike Adair
- Theme music composer: Rosie Okumura Marc Cazorla (season 3)
- Composers: Rosie Okumura; Christopher Fudurich (season 1-2); Marc Cazorla (season 3)
- Country of origin: United States
- Original language: English
- No. of seasons: 2
- No. of episodes: 16

Production
- Executive producers: Jason Bateman; Grant Kahler; Michael Costigan; Emma Ho; Mike Odair
- Production locations: Alaska (season 1-2); Panama (season 3)
- Cinematography: Jeff Santos; Ross Radcliffe
- Running time: 37–61 minutes
- Production companies: Aggregate Films; Nomad Entertainment

Original release
- Network: Netflix
- Release: March 10, 2023 – present

Related
- Outlast: The Jungle

Outlast is an American survival reality competition television series held in Alaska and Panama. The first season premiered on March 10, 2023, on Netflix with eight episodes. It is produced by Aggregate Films and Nomad Entertainment, with Mike Odair serving as the showrunner. Jason Bateman, Grant Kahler, Michael Costigan, Emma Ho, and Odair are executive producers. In May 2023, the series was renewed for a second season. In February 2025, the series was renewed for a third season.

In the series 16 players must survive off the land with meager supplies in the Alaskan wilderness. In season one, the players were referenced as "lone wolf" survivalists at times by critics. For each season, players begin in four teams of four players each. Players leave the game by firing a flare gun, which triggers an emergency rescue, medical evacuation, or extraction. The last remaining team of two or more people wins a million dollars divided among the winners. After a certain number of days pass with only two teams in the game, a navigation and endurance race is begun to gain the prize money.

== Format ==
Players compete for a $1,000,000 prize split with the members of the winning team. Rules include:

1. Must be on a team with at least two people

2. Teams may vote someone off and that someone must accept the vote

3. May not physically harm anyone

4. Can not lay traps to protect your camp which may harm each other

5. There can not be more than four teams

6. If a player is without a team, they have 24 hours to be accepted into another team or they are eliminated

7. A player may ask for a medical evaluation. If it is determined the player is unable to remain or accept help, they are eliminated

8. When only two teams are left, the producers begin a race to determine the final team

== Production ==
Season 1 filmed in the autumn of 2021 in Alaska, near Neka River, on Chichagof Island, west of Juneau. On May 15, 2023, Netflix renewed the series for a second season which filmed at Little Duncan Bay southwest of Petersburg, Alaska. Season 3 took place in Panama. For the third season, Team Alpha began with a hunting advantage and received three bows with arrows. Team Bravo had a fire advantage and made use of char cloths, ferro rods, and dry kindling. Team Charlie's advantage was having tarps, nails, rope, and paracord.

== Series overview ==
Series overview
Season	Episodes	Originally released
1	8	March 10, 2023
2	8	September 4, 2024

== Season 1 (2023) ==
=== Contestants ===
List of Outlast contestants
Contestant	Age	From	First Team	Final Team	Result	Episode							
Contestant	Age	From	First Team	Final Team	Result	Episode	Andrea Hilderbrand	51	Charlotte, North Carolina	Charlie	Charlie	Walked	1
Corey Johnson	28	Parker, Colorado	Bravo	Bravo	Walked	2							
Timothy Spears	33	Fort Collins, Colorado	Bravo	Bravo	Walked	2							
Lee Ettinger	57	Bigfork, Montana	Alpha	Alpha	Walked	2							
Jordan Williams	25	Fort Collins, Colorado	Delta	Delta	Evacuated	4							
Brian Kahrs	59	Holiday, Florida	Bravo	Bravo	Walked	5							
Dawn Nelson	43	Creston, Washington	Delta	Bravo	Walked	5							
Joel Hungate	33	McCordsville, Indiana	Delta	Bravo	Walked	5							
Javier Colón	42	San Francisco, California	Bravo	Bravo	Walked	6							
Angie Kenai	30	San Antonio, Texas	Charlie	Charlie	Evacuated	6							
Justin Court	44	La Grange, Kentucky	Alpha	Charlie	Walked	8							
Amber Asay	34	Phoenix, Arizona	Alpha	Alpha	Runners-up	8							
Jill Ashock	40	New Haven, Kentucky	Alpha	Alpha	Runners-up	8							
Nick Radner	36	Tampa, Florida	Charlie	Charlie	Winners	8							
Paul Preece	47	Knoxville, Tennessee	Delta	Charlie	Winners	8							
Seth Lueker	31	Winchester, Virginia	Charlie	Charlie	Winners	8							

=== Episodes ===
No. overall	No. in season	Title	Original release date
1	1	"Fire. Water. Flare."	March 10, 2023
2	2	"Hunger Pains"	March 10, 2023
3	3	"Man-Down"	March 10, 2023
4	4	"Hunting the Thief"	March 10, 2023
5	5	"Burn It to the Ground"	March 10, 2023
6	6	"Luring the Enemy"	March 10, 2023
7	7	"Desperate Measures"	March 10, 2023
8	8	"The Final Straw"	March 10, 2023

== Season 2 (2024) ==
=== Contestants ===
List of Outlast Contestants
Contestant	Age	From	First Team	Final Team	Result	Episode							
Contestant	Age	From	First Team	Final Team	Result	Episode	Bayardo "Bayo" Hernandez	51	Miami, Florida	Alpha	Alpha	Voted off	2
Zach Owens	33	Melba, Idaho	Alpha	Alpha	Evacuated	3							
Julio Laboy	56	Buckeye, Arizona	Charlie	Charlie	Walked	3							
Meghan Buchanan	49	Vail, Colorado	Charlie	Charlie	Walked	3							
Tonia Willman	53	Molalla, Oregon	Alpha	Alpha	Evacuated	5							
Deontre "Tre" Thomas	32	Austin, Texas	Alpha	Alpha	Walked	5							
Emily Johnston	32	Boulder, Colorado	Bravo	Bravo	Walked	6							
Bri Walston	26	Las Vegas, Nevada	Charlie	Bravo	Walked	6							
Sammy Norris	27	Flag Pond, Tennessee	Bravo	Bravo	Walked	7							
Brendon Ash	41	Gooding, Idaho	Delta	Delta	Runners-up	8							
Eric Shevchenko	49	Saginaw, Michigan	Delta	Delta	Runners-up	8							
Joey DiDesidero	35	Benton City, Washington	Charlie	Delta	Runners-up	8							
Joseph Malbrough	30	Lafayette, Louisiana	Delta	Delta	Runners-up	8							
Tina Grimm	41	Simi Valley, California	Delta	Delta	Runners-up	8							
Drake Vliem II	29	Midland, Texas	Bravo	Bravo	Winners	8							
Drew Haas	28	Hallettsville, Texas	Bravo	Bravo	Winners	8							

=== Episodes ===
No. overall	No. in season	Title	Original release date
9	1	"The Game Begins"	September 4, 2024
10	2	"Around the Bay"	September 4, 2024
11	3	"Two Battles at Once"	September 4, 2024
12	4	"The New Kid"	September 4, 2024
13	5	"The Tides Are Changing"	September 4, 2024
14	6	"Current Stress"	September 4, 2024
15	7	"Meeting the Enemy"	September 4, 2024
16	8	"Winners Are Made"	September 4, 2024

== Critical reception ==
The Guardian's Lucy Mangan found the first season "completely addictive, ridiculous and great". The Age's Karl Quinn also noted the addictive nature of the series, but bemoaned the lack of clear rules in the competition, which in turn enabled players to cheat and potentially endanger other players. Andy Dehnart of Reality Blurred says "With no rules Netflix's Outlast spawns brilliant, odious, predictable play... (it's) an average survival show that has shocking but predictable behavior to get its $1 million prize."

== Spinoffs ==
=== Outlast: The Jungle ===
On a remote tropical island, 16 players have to survive in the wild, beat their rivals, and team up to win a one-million-dollar prize.

List of Outlast: The Jungle Contestants
Contestant	Age	Occupation	First Team	Final Team	Result	Episode
Mary Wedell	27	Farmhand	Bravo	Bravo	Voted off	1
Sean Jacobs	38	African aid worker	Bravo	Bravo	Evacuated	2
Dave Cecchini	32	Expedition leader	Alpha	Alpha	Walked	3
Halle Cooley	20	Model	Alpha	Alpha	Walked	5
Marshall Strain	31	General contractor	Bravo	Bravo	Walked	5
Ben Orndorff	41	Former federal agent	Alpha	Alpha	Voted off	6
Sarah Awad	25	Former rugby player	Charlie	Bravo	Voted off	7
Morgan Colburn	26	Sales manager	Bravo	Bravo	Voted off	7
Braxton Fish	24	Adventure vlogger	Charlie	Charlie	Lose	8
Brett Johnson	21	Commercial fisherman	Charlie	Charlie	Lose	8
Wes Saunders	36	Former NFL player	Charlie	Charlie	Lose	8
Leiya Pillitteri	26	Makeup Artist	Charlie	Alpha	Voted off	8
Abby Chu	32	Dive master	Bravo	Bravo	Runners-up	8
Pharaoh Gayles	34	Wildlife educator	Bravo	Bravo	Runners-up	8
Maddy Jones	28	Photographer	Alpha	Alpha	Winners	8
Nikki Hru	28	Boxer	Alpha	Alpha	Winners	8
