= Cat Jahnke =

Canadian singer-songwriter

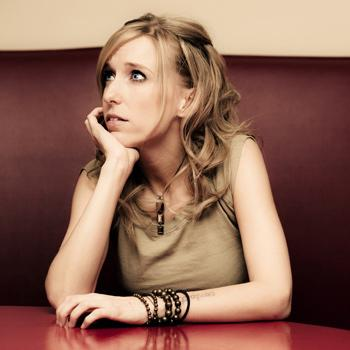
- Cat Jahnke promotional photo

Background information
- Born: Winnipeg, Manitoba, Canada
- Genres: Pop, folk rock
- Occupations: Singer-songwriter, musician
- Instruments: Piano, guitar, vocals
- Years active: 2003–present
- Label: Independent
- Website: catjahnke.com

Cat Jahnke (Yong-Kee) is a Canadian singer-songwriter. Her song "Apple" served as the theme song for the NBC web series Ctrl, while her "Happy Song" appeared in an episode of Degrassi: The Next Generation.

Jahnke, along with Darren Johnston, won Best Original Score in the 168 Hour Film Project (2006) for the film Free of Charge. Jahnke's song "None of Those Things" was also a finalist in the 2006 John Lennon Songwriting Contest.

Two of Jahnke's songs were featured in the music video game iDance 2. Her song "Apple" was also used in the fourth season of the reality show Dance Moms, in the teams group dance.

She also wrote songs for Mateusz Skutnik's videogames. "Better" for Daymare Cat, and "Let me go home" for Slice of Sea.

== Discography ==
- 2003: Cathartic
- 2006: None of Those Things
- 2008: O Night Divine
- 2010: The Stories Are Taking Their Toll
- 2019: The Boy, The Girl, The Wolf
