= Table 19 =

2017 film directed by Jeffrey Blitz

- Theatrical release poster
- Directed by: Jeffrey Blitz
- Screenplay by: Jeffrey Blitz
- Story by: Jay Duplass; Mark Duplass; Jeffrey Blitz
- Produced by: Shawn Levy; Tom McNulty; Mark Roberts; P. Jennifer Dana
- Starring: Anna Kendrick; Craig Robinson; June Squibb; Lisa Kudrow; Stephen Merchant; Tony Revolori; Wyatt Russell; Amanda Crew
- Cinematography: Ben Richardson
- Edited by: Yana Gorskaya
- Music by: John Swihart
- Production companies: 3311 Productions; 21 Laps Entertainment
- Distributed by: Fox Searchlight Pictures
- Release date: March 3, 2017
- Running time: 87 minutes
- Country: United States
- Language: English
- Budget: $5 million
- Box office: $5 million

Table 19 is a 2017 American romantic comedy film written and directed by Jeffrey Blitz, from a story originally written by brothers Jay and Mark Duplass. The film stars Anna Kendrick, Craig Robinson, June Squibb, Lisa Kudrow, Stephen Merchant, Wyatt Russell, and Tony Revolori.

The film was released on March 3, 2017, by Fox Searchlight Pictures, receiving generally mixed reviews from critics and grossed $5 million.

== Plot ==
Eloise McGarry attends her oldest friend Francie Millner's wedding. Originally maid of honor, she "dropped out" two months ago after her (now) ex-boyfriend Teddy, the best man and the bride's brother, broke up with her by text after two years together and returned to his old girlfriend. At the reception, Eloise discovers she is seated at Table 19. As she considers leaving, a fellow guest named Huck offers unsolicited advice, and she decides to stay.

Eloise meets her table mates: Jerry and Bina Kepp, Facebook friends of the groom's father; teen Renzo Eckberg, whose mom is an acquaintance of the groom; Jo Flanagan, Teddy and Francie's childhood nanny; and Walter Thimble, the bride's cousin, who is out on parole. They discuss whether Table 19 is a "good table," Eloise telling them that she helped plan the wedding, and she knows Table 19 is for misfits.

As the newlyweds arrive and begin dancing, Eloise starts feeling insecure and dances with Huck, whom she kisses. When he refuses to sit with her, she realizes he is a wedding crasher and "Huck" is not his real name, and he leaves.

Although not bonding initially, they come together when Jo realizes Eloise is pregnant. With the table's help, Eloise confronts Teddy about dumping her when she told him about the baby. Teddy says he broke up with her because she said they would be ridiculous parents, leaving Teddy hurt and worried he would disappoint her. The argument ends with them accidentally destroying the cake and hastily covering it up.

Bitter and covered in cake, Table 19 changes clothes and moves to Jo's room to smoke marijuana and talk. Walter reveals he went to prison for stealing $125,000 from the father of the bride because a former friend conned him. Renzo came to the wedding in lieu of his junior prom, as his mom thought he could meet someone. Jo feels she has wasted her life and the children she cared for have forgotten her.

The table goes for a walk, and Jerry gives Renzo advice on how to pick up girls, while Eloise realizes Jo has terminal cancer and will die in the next year. Jo tells Eloise that if she has a daughter she should not name her "Jo" as it is a tough name for a girl. Bina admits to Jerry she came to the wedding to have an affair with an ex, who did not show. They fight, and she heads back inside with Walter.

On Jo's suggestion, the six try to find the wedding crasher Eloise met earlier. They learn "Huck" is actually the groom from another wedding. As payback, Walter steals Huck's wedding cake to replace the one they destroyed earlier.

Returning to the reception, Table 19 is visited by the bride and groom, who express genuine happiness that everyone there has attended. Francie and Eloise talk briefly, Francie apologizes that she was seated so far away from her, and Eloise decides to leave early. Francie then assures Jo she has not forgotten her, telling a brief but touching childhood story about Teddy, inspiring the table to see him differently. They track down Eloise, encouraging her to tell him how she really feels. As the core wedding party leaves on a ferry, she tries to apologize to him from the dock, but he is too far away to hear her.

Eloise, Walter, Jo, and Renzo return to the wedding hall for the last of the cake. In their room, the Kepps discuss their fragile marriage and reconcile before joining them. Teddy suddenly reappears, dripping wet from jumping off the ferry, and asks Eloise to repeat what she said. Eloise asks that they be willing to forgive each other and they reconcile, and the entire group dances to one last song.

A few months later, the Kepps have repaired their strained marriage, Jo has died of cancer, and the Kepps have taken in Jo's dog. Renzo has a girlfriend, and Walter refers to the other Table 19 guests as family. Eloise and Teddy are together and have had their baby. They mail birth announcements to their friends and family, including Table 19. The card reveals they had a son whom they named Joe.

== Cast ==
- Anna Kendrick as Eloise McGarry
- Craig Robinson as Jerry Kepp
- June Squibb as Jo Flanagan
- Lisa Kudrow as Bina Kepp
- Stephen Merchant as Walter Thimble
- Tony Revolori as Renzo Eckberg
- Wyatt Russell as Teddy Millner
- Amanda Crew as Nikki
- Thomas Cocquerel as Huck
- Becky Ann Baker as Carol Millner
- Andy Daly as Luke Pfaffler
- Maria Thayer as Infamous Kate Millner
- Andy Blitz as Notorious Donny Haczyk
- Brad Oberhofer as Wedding Singer
- Rya Meyers as Francie Millner
- Margo Martindale as Freda Eckberg
- Megan Lawless as Megan-Ann

== Production ==
In April 2009, Fox Searchlight Pictures acquired the film, with Jay Duplass and Mark Duplass set to direct their own screenplay. In October 2011, Jeffrey Blitz was brought in to rewrite the script and direct the film. On March 24, 2015, it was announced that Anna Kendrick, Craig Robinson, Lisa Kudrow, Stephen Merchant, Tony Revolori, June Squibb, Wyatt Russell, and Amanda Crew would star in the film.

Principal photography began in the Atlanta area on March 27, 2015, and ended on April 30, 2015. While the plot places the wedding at a resort on an island in the fictional "Lake Alma", in Michigan, filming took place on the Lake Lanier Islands, northeast of Atlanta and at The Ritz-Carlton Reynolds on Lake Oconee, southeast of Atlanta. Other scenes were filmed in Douglasville, west of Atlanta. Foxhall Resort is one of the production sites of the movie. It was filmed in a venue called "Legacy".

== Music ==
In February 2016, it was announced that John Swihart would score the film. Several songs from popular folk band The Oh Hellos are used throughout the film. Popular music for the film drew from 1980s new wave songs covered by the New York band Oberhofer, sounding as if they were performed by a wedding band. These cover songs were released as the film's soundtrack album.

== Release ==
The film was originally scheduled to be released on January 20, 2017, before being pushed back to March 3.

=== Critical response ===
On Rotten Tomatoes, the film has an approval rating of 25% based on 118 reviews, with an average rating of 4.55/10. The website's critical consensus reads, "Table 19 is marginally more entertaining than actually sitting with a table full of strangers at a wedding — although most screenings won't come with an open bar, which makes it a wash." On Metacritic, the film has a score of 40 out of 100, based on reviews from 29 critics, indicating "mixed or average reviews".

David Fear of Rolling Stone magazine called the film “[a] tonally uneven mishmash of Wes Anderson quirk, John Cassavetes guts-spilling and The Breakfast Club, all of which somehow manages to dampen the talents of its crack ensemble cast." Owen Gleiberman of Variety magazine wrote that “[a]lmost everything that happens in this movie rings cloyingly false. It wants to make you laugh and cry, but you may be too busy cringing."
