= State v. Lafferty =

1984 murder case in Utah, U.S.

Murders of Brenda Wright Lafferty and Erica Lafferty
- Location: American Fork, Utah, United States of America
- Date: July 24, 1984; 42 years ago
- Weapon: Knife
- Deaths: 2 (Brenda Wright Lafferty and Erica Lafferty)
- Perpetrators: Ron Lafferty; Dan Lafferty

State of Utah v. Lafferty was a 1984 murder case in the U.S. state of Utah. Brothers Ron and Dan Lafferty were found guilty of murdering their brother Allen's wife Brenda Lafferty, along with Brenda's young daughter. The case gained substantial publicity due to statements by the accused that the murders were the result of a divine revelation related to the defendants' extremist interpretation of Mormon fundamentalist beliefs.

== History ==
Ron Lafferty and his younger brother Dan were charged with the homicides of their sister-in-law Brenda Wright Lafferty and her 15-month-old daughter Erica that occurred on July 24, 1984 in the city of American Fork, Utah. Both victims died after their throats were cut.

Ron was a self-proclaimed prophet, affiliated with the School of Prophets, a fundamentalist Mormon sect. Ron and Dan had both been excommunicated from the mainline Church of Jesus Christ of Latter-day Saints in 1983. Ron claimed to have received a revelation from God in which he was instructed to "remove" several people, including the two victims. Ron planned several additional homicides, but fled Utah after killing Brenda and Erica. The brothers were arrested in Reno, Nevada several weeks after the crime, and quickly confessed.

The Lafferty brothers were charged with homicide in August 1984. Dan Lafferty represented himself, but attorneys Michael Esplin and Gary Weight were appointed to serve as "standby" counsel for the brothers. Esplin and Weight also represented the brothers during their competency hearings. At the conclusion of the competency evaluations, and while incarcerated in the Utah County jail, Ron attempted suicide in December 1984. This suicide attempt resulted in severe injury and mental damage. Following the suicide attempt, Ron was held at the Utah State Hospital for several months.

== Dan's case ==
The brothers were tried separately. Dan's jury trial resulted in a guilty verdict. He was sentenced to two life terms, to be served concurrently without the possibility of parole. Esplin and Weight appealed the case to the Utah Supreme Court, which upheld his conviction.

Dan Lafferty was alive as of 2022, still imprisoned in Utah.

== Ron's case ==
Ron Lafferty was found competent to stand trial by doctors at the Utah State Hospital. Ron was tried in 1985, convicted, and sentenced to death. The penalty was upheld after an appeal to the Utah Supreme Court. The United States Supreme Court rejected a further appeal.

The U.S. District Court for the District of Utah upheld the conviction; however, the 10th Circuit Court of Appeals overturned the lower court's verdict and reversed the conviction, finding that the state and the lower court judge had committed an error in finding Ron competent to stand trial. The state of Utah filed an appeal with the United States Supreme Court, which was turned down.

Ron was remanded to the Fourth District Court for Utah to undergo competency proceedings. Ron was found incompetent to stand trial, and was sent to the Utah State Hospital for treatment.

Three years later, a court found that Ron's competency was "restored" and in 1996 he was retried for the crimes. After a three-week trial, Ron was found guilty of a capital offense. Further appeals to the Supreme Court of Utah and the U.S. Supreme Court were denied.

On August 12, 2019, the 10th Circuit Court of Appeals refused to hear Ron's case by a unanimous decision. Judge Mary Beck Briscoe wrote:

Lafferty has failed to make this showing with respect to any of the four claims on which he seeks a COA [certificate of appealability].

The court's decision gave Ron few options left to appeal his execution. Ron elected to be executed by firing squad.

Ron Lafferty died in prison of natural causes in November 2019, at the age of 78.

== In popular culture ==
Jon Krakauer's 2003 true crime book Under the Banner of Heaven is partly based upon interviews with Dan Lafferty.

Krakauer's book was adapted into drama television miniseries created by Dustin Lance Black, Under the Banner of Heaven. The series was premiered on April 28, 2022, on FX on Hulu. Ron and Dan are portrayed by Sam Worthington and Wyatt Russell, respectively.

The Investigation Discovery show American Monster (Season 3 Episode 5) titled "Band of Brothers" covers the case.
