= Anything but Ghosts =

Upcoming film by Curry Barker

- Official title treatment
- Directed by: Curry Barker
- Written by: Curry Barker; Cooper Tomlinson
- Produced by: Roy Lee; Steven Schneider; Jason Blum; Adam Hendricks; Greg Gilreath
- Starring: Cooper Tomlinson; Curry Barker; Violet McGraw; Chris Reinacher; Bryce Dallas Howard; Aaron Paul; Matthew Lillard
- Cinematography: Taylor Clemons
- Edited by: Curry Barker
- Music by: Rock Burwell
- Production companies: Blumhouse Atomic; Spooky Pictures; Divide/Conquer
- Distributed by: Focus Features (United States); Universal Pictures (International)
- Release date: May 7, 2027
- Country: United States
- Language: English
- Budget: $5 million

Anything but Ghosts is an upcoming American comedy horror film directed by Curry Barker who co-wrote the script with Cooper Tomlinson. The film stars Tomlinson, Barker, Violet McGraw, Chris Reinacher, Bryce Dallas Howard, Aaron Paul, and Matthew Lillard. Its plot follows two fake paranormal investigators who eventually face actual ghosts while operating their deceptive business. The film takes place in the same fictional universe as Barker's previous film, Obsession (2025).

Jason Blum, Roy Lee, and Steven Schneider serve as producers through their Blumhouse Atomic and Spooky Pictures banners, respectively, alongside Divide/Conquer, Image Nation Studios, and That's a Bad Idea.

Anything but Ghosts is scheduled to be released in the United States by Focus Features and Universal Pictures on May 7, 2027.

== Premise ==
Two fake paranormal investigators must face real ghosts while dealing with the deception of their own fraudulent business.

In June 2026, Tomlinson described the film "like if Key and Peele walked into Hereditary" while on a podcast.

== Cast ==
- Cooper Tomlinson as Eddy
- Curry Barker as Mouse
- Bryce Dallas Howard
- Aaron Paul
- Violet McGraw
- Chris Reinacher
- Matthew Lillard

== Production ==
=== Development ===
In September 2025, it was announced that Curry Barker would direct, co-write, and co-star in Anything but Ghosts with Cooper Tomlinson. Jason Blum would produce for Blumhouse-Atomic Monster, Roy Lee and Steven Schneider for Spooky Pictures, Adam Hendricks and Greg Gilreath for Divide/Conquer, with Image Nation Abu Dhabi and That's a Bad Idea backing the film.

=== Casting ===
In April 2026, Aaron Paul, Bryce Dallas Howard, and Violet McGraw joined the cast of the film. In June 2026, actor and comedian Chris Reinacher joined the cast. In November 2026, it was revealed that Matthew Lillard would join the cast.

=== Filming ===
Principal photography began on March 9, 2026, in Vancouver, under the working title Faraday and wrapped on April 11, 2026.

== Release ==
Anything but Ghosts is scheduled to be released in theaters on May 7, 2027.

In March 2026, Focus Features acquired distribution rights to the film, having previously acquired Barker's directorial debut Obsession.
