= Under the Banner of Heaven (miniseries) =

2022 American television miniseries

- Official poster
- Genre: True crime; Psychological drama
- Created by: Dustin Lance Black
- Based on: Under the Banner of Heaven by Jon Krakauer
- Starring: Andrew Garfield; Sam Worthington; Daisy Edgar-Jones; Denise Gough; Wyatt Russell; Billy Howle; Chloe Pirrie; Seth Numrich; Adelaide Clemens; Rory Culkin; Sandra Seacat; Gil Birmingham
- Composers: Jeff Ament; Josh Klinghoffer; John Wicks
- Country of origin: United States
- Original language: English
- No. of episodes: 7

Production
- Executive producers: Jason Bateman; Gillian Berrie; Dustin Lance Black; Michael Costigan; Anna Culp; Samie Kim Falvey; Brian Grazer; Ron Howard; David Mackenzie
- Producers: Leslie Cowan; Brian Dennis
- Production location: Calgary
- Cinematography: Gonzalo Amat
- Editors: Justin Lachance; Mark Manos; Chris McKinley
- Running time: 63–88 minutes
- Production companies: Hungry Jackal Productions; Aggregate Films; Imagine Television; FXP

Original release
- Network: FX on Hulu
- Release: April 28 – June 2, 2022

Under the Banner of Heaven is an American true crime drama television miniseries created by Dustin Lance Black, based on the 2003 non-fiction book by Jon Krakauer about the case of brothers Ron and Dan Lafferty who killed their sister-in-law and her young daughter in 1984. The series premiered on April 28, 2022, on FX on Hulu. Andrew Garfield and Gil Birmingham star as two detectives investigating a brutal murder and its connections to the Church of Jesus Christ of Latter-day Saints (LDS Church).

The series earned positive reviews, particularly for the performances of Garfield and Wyatt Russell. However, it also reignited controversy about depictions of the LDS Church, and while the victims' relatives and police involved in the case acknowledged that it was not meant to be a documentary series, they did note areas where the fictionalized series deviated from the specific facts.

== Premise ==
The faith of police detective Jeb Pyre is shaken when investigating the murder of a Latter-day Saint mother and her baby daughter that seems to involve the LDS Church.

== Cast ==
=== Main ===
- Andrew Garfield as Detective Jeb Pyre, a Latter-day Saint detective for the East Rockwell, Utah police department
- Gil Birmingham as Detective Bill Taba, a Southern Paiute man and Jeb's partner
- Adelaide Clemens as Rebecca Pyre, Jeb's wife
- Sandra Seacat as Josie Pyre, Jeb's mother who is suffering from dementia

=== Lafferty Family ===
- Daisy Edgar-Jones as Brenda Lafferty, Allen's wife
- Billy Howle as Allen Lafferty, Brenda's husband
- Wyatt Russell as Dan Lafferty, Matilda's husband
- Chloe Pirrie as Matilda Lafferty, Dan's wife
- Sam Worthington as Ron Lafferty, Dianna's husband
- Denise Gough as Dianna Lafferty, Ron's wife
- Seth Numrich as Robin Lafferty, based on Mark Lafferty
- Rory Culkin as Samuel Lafferty, Sarah's husband, based on Watson Lafferty, Jr.
- Britt Irvin as Sarah Lafferty, Samuel's wife
- Christopher Heyerdahl as Ammon Lafferty, Doreen's husband and father to Ron, Dan, Robin, Jacob, Samuel and Allen, based on Watson Lafferty
- Megan Leitch as Doreen Lafferty, Ammon's wife and mother to Ron, Dan, Robin, Jacob, Samuel and Allen
- Taylor St. Pierre as Jacob Lafferty, based on Tim Lafferty

Lafferty family tree

Ammon
Doreen
Ron	Dan	Robin	Jacob	Samuel	Allen
Dianna	Matilda	Lynn	Sarah	Brenda

=== Recurring ===
- Darren Goldstein as Mr. Wright
- Andrew Burnap as Joseph Smith
- Tyner Rushing as Emma Smith
- Scott Michael Campbell as Brigham Young
- Nicholas Carella as Bernard Brady
- Barclay Hope as Chief Rick Belnap
- Rohan Mead as Officer Morris
- Dean Paul Gibson as Prophet Onias
- Daniel Libman as Stake President Roy Ballard
- Jerod Blake as Desk Cop
- Scott Olynek as Officer Denney

== Episodes ==
No.	Title	Directed by	Written by	Original release date
1	"When God Was Love"	David Mackenzie	Dustin Lance Black	April 28, 2022
In 1984, in the fictional city of East Rockwell, Utah, LDS Detective Jeb Pyre and Paiute Detective Bill Taba investigate the brutal murder of Brenda Wright Lafferty, an LDS woman, and her baby daughter, Erica. Brenda's husband, Allen Lafferty, is arrested but claims men with beards committed the murders. He says he is no longer part of the LDS Church, which upsets the devout Pyre. Flashbacks show Brenda was the vivacious daughter of an Idaho bishop, and she met Allen while attending Brigham Young University. The Lafferty family is a highly respected and conservative LDS family. Allen recalls that when his parents (Ammon and Doreen) were assigned a two-year-long mission, Ammon chose middle sons Dan and Robin to oversee the family and run his chiropractic business; he purposely snubbed his eldest son, Ron. Another set of flashbacks portrays Joseph Smith, the founder of Mormonism, having a religious revelation and proposing to Emma Hale. In the present, police arrest a bearded Robin Lafferty at a motel.
2	"Rightful Place"	David Mackenzie	Dustin Lance Black	April 28, 2022
Pyre questions Robin and Allen in separate rooms at the police station. Detective Taba investigates reports of gunfire, and is lured deep into the woods by a mysterious girl. Flashbacks to 1830s Kirtland, Ohio reveal the tense relations between the Church of Latter-Day Saints and other residents, resulting in the Mormons being forced to leave. Robin explains to Pyre that the family business ran into financial difficulties and they could not afford to pay federal taxes. As a result, Dan and Robin filed lawsuits and became tax protesters. Allen knew his brothers did not like Brenda, as they considered her too independent for a woman. He feared for Brenda's safety, recalling how Ammon once killed the family dog to punish the boys for not doing chores. Taba finds a cabin in the woods and is confronted with a gun.
3	"Surrender"	Courtney Hunt	Story by : Emer Gillespie and Dustin Lance Black; Teleplay by : Dustin Lance Black	May 5, 2022
Pyre and backup arrive to help Taba. They arrest Sam Lafferty and he speaks of a list consisting of sinners that need to be cleansed by blood atonement. The list includes several prominent LDS families, and police quickly search for them. Sam's daughter reveals to Pyre that tensions between the brothers and Ammon reached the point of violence when Ammon did not approve of Dan's extreme views. Pyre consults his bishop about violent teachings in the LDS Church's past, and is told to not question it. Brenda tries to convince Dan to end his anti-tax stance but he refuses. She then asks Allen to distance himself from his brothers, to which he agrees only if she puts off her career to have children. Allen says he now realizes he was putting Brenda in a cage. Robin discovers Brenda and his niece were murdered and tearfully insists he had nothing to do with it.
4	"Church and State"	Courtney Hunt	Gina Welch	May 12, 2022
Pyre, Taba, and Officer Morris investigate Bishop Low's empty house, which has been vandalized. Pyre discovers a letter that Dianna (Ron's wife) wrote, with Brenda's help, to LDS President Spencer W. Kimball, as she was concerned about the Lafferty brothers' extreme behavior. Bank employee LaConte Bascom reports that Ron was denied a loan to save his construction business because the church did not approve of his brothers' libertarian anti-tax activism. Dan had visited a Fundamentalist LDS community and studied The Peace Maker, a document by Udney Hays Jacob that preaches polygamy as a man's holy right. He also convinced Ron to support his radical beliefs. Pyre connects the Lafferty family to Bishop Low's house invasion. Officer Morris locates Bishop Low, who was on a fishing trip.
5	"One Mighty and Strong"	Dustin Lance Black	Brandon Boyce	May 19, 2022
Sam mentions a group called the School of the Prophets. Pyre and Taba learn from Bishop Low that Dan and Ron were excommunicated: Dan for wanting to take his two underage step-daughters as plural wives, and Ron for his controversial politics and for beating Dianna. The detectives question Bernard Brady, who was in the School of the Prophets with the Lafferty brothers and a man called Prophet Onias. Brady and Allen guide Pyre and Taba to the Lafferty farm, where they discover three women from a Canadian community alone, having been abandoned by Ron and Dan. Pyre discovers Ron's list of people who they believe must face blood atonement. Brady reveals that Ammon died because Ron refused to provide him with medical care, citing Ammon's own beliefs and abuse toward the brothers in the past. Flashbacks to the 19th-century recount Emma Smith's rejection of polygamy, Joseph Smith's killing, and Brigham Young's rise to lead the LDS Church.
6	"Revelation"	Isabel Sandoval	Gina Welch	May 26, 2022
Ron sought out a fundamentalist Mormon group that practiced polygamy. Their mother reveals to Pyre that there were two men named Chip and Ricky with her sons the night of Brenda's murder. The School of the Prophets encouraged a return to old and racist practices. Onias tells Ron he is their "One" chosen by God to receive God's revelations, which Ron believes. Brenda and Allen's marriage was on the rocks due to Allen's devotion to his extremist brothers. After he struck her, Brenda had asked the Church to grant her a divorce, but she was instead charged with saving the Lafferty clan from their ways. When she attempted to do so, she was threatened by Dan and Matilda with blood atonement. Bishop Low and Brenda help Dianna and her children flee town for their safety, but Pyre worries Ron may have found and killed Dianna. Pyre breaks down as he confronts his now-wavering faith, reading the book Allen directed him to, Mormonism: Shadow or Reality?. Taba encounters Onias in the wilderness.
7	"Blood Atonement"	Thomas Schlamme	Brandon Boyce and Dustin Lance Black	June 2, 2022
Onias tells Taba that the power of being the "One" corrupted Ron. Flashbacks address the Mountain Meadows Massacre of 1857 and conflicting accounts of what occurred. Pyre is asked to twist the law to save the LDS Church from bad publicity, but he refuses. Pyre's loss of faith causes a rift in his marriage. Allen tells Pyre that he and Brenda reconciled before her death. Jacob gives Dan's journal to the police, which Pyre uses to identify leads. Pyre and Taba go to Wyoming to interview Chip and Ricky, who recall Dan slashed Brenda and Erica's throats while Ron helped. Taba confronts Pyre about blindly believing the LDS Church's version of history. In Miami, Florida, Dianna's children are taken to a safe house. Dianna returns to the Lafferty home, finds Matilda, and they flee Utah. Pyre and Taba locate Ron and Dan in the Circus Circus Casino in Reno, Nevada. The brothers are arrested just as Ron attempts to murder Dan in a bid to become the true "One." Pyre returns home and reconciles with his wife, no longer a believing man but seeing his family as his faith like Allen before him.

== Production ==
Initially intended to be adapted as a film beginning in 2011, it was announced in June 2021 that it would now be developed as a miniseries, with Dustin Lance Black retained as screenwriter and David Mackenzie serving as director. Andrew Garfield and Daisy Edgar-Jones were cast to star. The cast was rounded out in August, with Sam Worthington, Wyatt Russell, Denise Gough, Rory Culkin, and Gil Birmingham among the new additions.

[A] criticism was the overuse of the word "brother". Everyone calls [each other] "brother" and "sister" in the show. And while that does happen in Utah — especially in the 80s, especially in small towns — I agree that it's sort of overused to our ears. But again we're trying to communicate that this is an insular community where everybody's a member of this organization, to someone who has no outside interaction with Mormonism.

— Lindsay Hansen Park, The Jimmy Rex Show

Lindsay Hansen Park (of the Sunstone Education Foundation) and Troy Williams (of Equality Utah) worked as cultural and historical consultants. Lindsay Hansen Park says that when the show's creator employed her, he said her job was to "keep us honest."

Filming in Calgary began in August 2021 and was completed in December 2021.

== Release and reception ==
The series premiered on April 28, 2022, on FX on Hulu. It is also set to premiere on Disney+ (Star) in international markets and Star+ In Latin America soon after. The series made its linear television premiere on the FX channel on March 7, 2023.

In November 2023, Disney Entertainment reached a deal with ITV to distribute Under the Banner of Heaven on ITVX in the United Kingdom, where it was released on February 26, 2024.

=== Viewership ===
Whip Media, which tracks viewership data for the more than 21 million worldwide users of its TV Time app, calculated that Under the Banner of Heaven was the most anticipated new televisions series of April 2022. According to market research company Parrot Analytics, which looks at consumer engagement in consumer research, streaming, downloads, and on social media, Under the Banner of Heaven experienced a 98% increase in demand following the debut of its third episode, securing the fifth spot on the charts from the week ending April 30 to the week ending May 6. The streaming aggregator Reelgood, which monitors real-time data from 5 million users in the U.S. for original and acquired streaming programs and movies across subscription video-on-demand (SVOD) and ad-supported video-on-demand (AVOD) services, reported that Under the Banner of Heaven was the seventh most-streamed program across all platforms during the week of May 4 and moved to the eighth position during the week of May 11, 2022. It later reached the fifth spot for the week of May 14 before settling at the ninth position during the week of May 21. Parrot Analytics reported that for the week ending June 3, Under the Banner of Heaven experienced a 9% increase in demand, reaching 19.4 times the average series demand in the U.S. following its finale on June 2, 2022.

=== Critical response ===
The review aggregator website Rotten Tomatoes reported an 87% approval rating with an average rating of 7.50/10, based on 52 critic reviews. The website's critics consensus reads, "While Under the Banner of Heaven gets bogged down by an overabundance of backstory, its procedural through-line is enriched by thoughtfully grappling with personal faith." Metacritic, which uses a weighted average, assigned a score of 71 out of 100 based on 25 critics, indicating "generally favorable reviews".

Historian Patrick Q. Mason, in a review of the show, pointed out that it is the most recent entry in a long history of American media portrayals of Mormons as inherently violent. McKay Coppins, a Mormon journalist, stated in an article in The Atlantic that the series demonizes Mormons and misrepresents the faith. He said that "no one involved in the show felt compelled to check the customary boxes Hollywood creators have been trained to check in this era of inclusiveness and representation. Black did not hire any practicing Mormons to write or consult on the show." Lindsay Hansen Park later disputed Coppins's assertion, saying numerous Latter-day Saints were consulted for the series, some of whom were identified on a Facebook page while others preferred anonymity: "We had bishops, we had Relief Society Presidents, we had a good number of faithful people that we consulted."

Randy Johnson, the American Fork chief of police in charge of the 1984 murder investigation said, "I find the book to be substantially more accurate than the miniseries. ... I cannot recognize any actual person that I knew or came to know, accurately depicted in the series. The series does not reflect the actual investigation that I oversaw. Nor does it reflect the attitudes, behaviors and conduct of me or any of my officers. It is clearly a work of fiction as indicated by the disclaimer.” Sharon Wright Weeks, Brenda's sister, said she felt no ill-will towards Edgar-Jones but also added: "I do not recognize her [Brenda] at all in any of the show."

=== Awards and nominations ===
Year	Award	Category	Nominee	Result	Ref.
2022	HCA TV Awards	Best Streaming Limited or Anthology Series	Under the Banner of Heaven	Nominated	
2022	HCA TV Awards	Best Actor in a Streaming Limited or Anthology Series	Andrew Garfield	Nominated	
2022	HCA TV Awards	Best Supporting Actor in a Streaming Limited or Anthology Series	Wyatt Russell	Nominated	
2022	HCA TV Awards	Best Supporting Actress in a Streaming Limited or Anthology Series	Daisy Edgar-Jones	Nominated	
2022	HCA TV Awards	Best Directing in a Streaming Limited or Anthology Series	Isabel Sandoval (for "Revelation")	Nominated	
2022	HCA TV Awards	Best Writing in a Streaming Limited or Anthology Series	Dustin Lance Black (for "When God Was Love")	Nominated	
2022	Primetime Emmy Awards	Outstanding Lead Actor in a Limited or Anthology Series or Movie	Andrew Garfield	Nominated	
2022	TCA Awards	Outstanding Achievement in Movies, Miniseries and Specials	Under the Banner of Heaven	Nominated	
2023	Critics' Choice Awards	Best Movie/ Miniseries	Under the Banner of Heaven	Nominated	
2023	Critics' Choice Awards	Best Actor in a Movie/ Miniseries	Andrew Garfield	Nominated	
2023	Golden Globe Awards	Best Actor – Miniseries or TV Film	Andrew Garfield	Nominated	
2023	Golden Globe Awards	Best Supporting Actress - TV	Daisy Edgar-Jones	Nominated	
2023	Satellite Awards	Best Miniseries	Under the Banner of Heaven	Won	
2023	Satellite Awards	Best Actor – Miniseries or TV Film	Andrew Garfield	Nominated	
2023	Satellite Awards	Best Supporting Actor – TV	Sam Worthington	Nominated	
