= Emy Coligado =

American actress (born 1971)

- Born: June 5, 1971 (age 55); Borger, Texas, U.S.
- Occupation: Actress
- Years active: 2000–present
- Website: emycoligado.com

Emy Coligado (born June 5, 1971) is an American actress known for her role as Piama Tananahaakna on the sitcom Malcolm in the Middle. In 2001, Coligado landed a recurring role as Emmy, the medical examiner's assistant, on the drama Crossing Jordan. Coligado also appears on NBC's web series CTRL as well as Poppy Tang in NBC's Chuck. She also played Ling in the 2012 film The Three Stooges. Most recently, Coligado played the role of Helen Yung in Archive 81 and Carlotta in the Apple TV series The Changeling starring Lakeith Stanfield.

Coligado was born in Borger, Texas, and is of Filipino descent. On Broadway she portrayed Yvonne in Miss Saigon (1991).

== Filmography ==
=== Film ===
Year	Title	Role	Notes
2005	Miss Congeniality 2: Armed and Fabulous	Gate Agent	
2005	Don't Come Knocking	Desk Clerk	
2005	Kids in America	Emily Chua	
2007	Ctrl Z	Elizabeth Carter	Short film
2010	Pie	Kat	Short film
2011	Marathoners	Dottie Bueno	Short film
2012	The Three Stooges	Ling	
2020	First One In	CeeCee	
2020	The Girl Who Left Home	Mary Santos	
2020	The Catch	Lily McManus	
2025	Summer of 69	Margaret	
TBA	The Cackling of the Dodos		Filming

=== Television ===
Year	Title	Role	Notes
2000	Sabrina the Teenage Witch	Felice	Episode: "House of Pi's"
2001	ER	Student #6	Episode: "A Walk in the Woods"
2001	The Brothers García	Neeko	Episode: "Larry's Curse"
2001–07	Crossing Jordan	Emmy	Recurring role (seasons 1–6); 30 episodes
2002	Strong Medicine	Nurse Betsy Welling	Episode: "Shok"
2002–06	Malcolm in the Middle	Piama	Recurring role (seasons 3–7); 28 episodes
2003	Everybody Loves Raymond	Claudia	Episode: "Sweet Charity"
2004	Fillmore!	Rochelle	Voice role; "A Dark Score Evened"
2006	Grey's Anatomy	Janelle Duco	Episode: "From a Whisper to a Scream"
2007	Men in Trees	Lucy Woo	Episode: "No Man Is an Iceland"
2007	Chuck	Poppy Tang	Episode: "Chuck Versus the Truth"
2009	Ctrl	Elizabeth	Web series; Main cast (season 1); 10 episodes
2010	Stalker Chronicles	Angel	Episode: "Jenny"
2011	And Boris	Angelica	Television short series
2014	Shameless	Wesley Gretsky	Episode: "Emily"
2017	Fresh Off the Boat	Norma	Episode: "The Masters"
2017	Claws	Mrs. Choi	Episode: "Batshit"
2021	Run the World	Julie	Episode: "Phenomenal Women"
2022	Archive 81	Helen Yung	Episode: "Spirit Receivers"
2023	The Changeling	Carlotta	5 episodes
2024	Based on a True Story	Tanya	Episode: "Liquid Gold"
2026	Malcolm in the Middle: Life's Still Unfair	Piama	Recurring role
