= Hit Man (2023 film) =

2023 film by Richard Linklater

- Release poster
- Directed by: Richard Linklater
- Screenplay by: Richard Linklater; Glen Powell
- Based on: "Hit Man" by Skip Hollandsworth
- Produced by: Mike Blizzard; Richard Linklater; Glen Powell; Jason Bateman; Michael Costigan
- Starring: Glen Powell; Adria Arjona; Austin Amelio; Retta; Sanjay Rao
- Cinematography: Shane F. Kelly
- Edited by: Sandra Adair
- Music by: Graham Reynolds
- Production companies: AGC Studios; S.H. Pictures; Monarch Media; Barnstorm Co.; Aggregate Films; Cinetic Media; Detour Filmproduction
- Distributed by: Netflix
- Release dates: September 5, 2023 (Venice); May 24, 2024 (United States); June 7, 2024 (Netflix)
- Running time: 115 minutes
- Country: United States
- Language: English
- Budget: $8.8 million
- Box office: $4 million

Hit Man is a 2023 American romantic crime comedy film produced and directed by Richard Linklater, who co-wrote the screenplay with Glen Powell. The film stars Powell, Adria Arjona, Austin Amelio, Retta, and Sanjay Rao. It follows an undercover New Orleans police contractor who poses as a reliable hitman as he tries to save a woman in need. The basic premise was based on the true story of a college professor who worked for the Houston police in the late 1980s and 1990s as a fake hitman, as described in a 2001 magazine article by Skip Hollandsworth.

Hit Man premiered at the 80th Venice International Film Festival on September 5, 2023. It was released in select theaters in the United States on May 24, 2024, before its streaming debut by Netflix on June 7, to critical acclaim.

== Plot ==
Gary Johnson is a mild-mannered professor of psychology and philosophy at the University of New Orleans who also works for the New Orleans Police Department to assist in sting operations. When Jasper, an undercover detective who portrays fake hitmen to solicit and then prevent murder-for-hire schemes is suspended for brutality, Gary is unwillingly ushered into the role.

Gary quickly finds himself to be a natural in garnering solicitations, researching suspects in advance, and tailoring a unique hitman persona for each. He becomes a confident and charismatic man named Ron for a discontented married woman named Madison, who is trying to have her abusive husband killed. Gary quickly finds himself both sympathetic and attracted to her, ultimately refusing the money and suggesting she use it to restart her life, much to the disappointment of Jasper and Gary's co-workers, Claudette and Phil.

Gary later begins a sexual relationship with Madison without revealing his true identity to her. To keep up the appearance of being a hitman, Gary shows her how to use a gun, advising her to aim for the heart. While leaving a nightclub, Gary and Madison have a heated encounter with Ray, Madison's husband, which ends with Gary pulling a gun to back him off. Later that night, the couple encounter Jasper, who is suspicious of their being together. A furious Ray attempts to have Madison killed, unknowingly contacting Gary.

Upon recognizing Gary as Madison's boyfriend, Ray rushes out of the sting, proclaiming that he will kill her himself. Gary informs Madison and attempts to move her out of her house, but she dismisses his fears, stating that Ray would not follow through. Gary later learns that Ray was killed after being shot in the heart. He confronts Madison, and she admits to the murder, prompting him to reveal his true identity in a panic.

After being kicked out by Madison, Gary returns to the police, who reveal their evidence on her is building after discovering Ray increased his life insurance policy before he died. Jasper, who knows of Gary and Madison's relationship and is jealous that he took his job, suggests Gary try to elicit a confession out of her using the character of Ron.

Gary arrives at Madison's house with a wire and pretends to interrogate her while giving her acting cues typed on his phone. Their charade convinces the police that she is innocent, but Jasper later comes to Madison's home, blackmailing her and Gary to pay him the money that Madison inherited from Ray's life insurance policy, lest he send them both to prison for Ray's murder. Madison drugs Jasper's drink, causing him to pass out, and Gary ties a plastic bag over his head, planning to stage his murder as a suicide.

Years later, Gary and Madison are happily married with two children.

== Cast ==
- Glen Powell as Gary Johnson, college professor and tech guy turned undercover mole
- Adria Arjona as Madison Figueroa Masters, an unhappily married woman who tries to hire Gary to kill her husband
- Austin Amelio as Jasper, an undercover police officer
- Retta as Claudette, a police officer
- Sanjay Rao as Phil, a police officer
- Molly Bernard as Alicia, Gary's ex-wife
- Evan Holtzman as Ray, Madison's ex-husband

== Production ==
Before the 2022 Cannes Film Market, Hit Man was announced to international buyers with Richard Linklater directing and writing and Glen Powell starring and producing. The screenplay, based on the article "Hit Man" by Skip Hollandsworth published in Texas Monthly in 2001, was written by Richard Linklater and Glen Powell, who also directed and starred, respectively. The article told the true story of Gary Johnson, a college professor who worked for the Houston police in the late 1980s and 1990s, pretending to be a contract killer. Much of the rest of the plot is fiction, and takes place in a modern setting. He died in 2022, and the film includes a dedication before the end credits: "Dedicated to Gary Johnson, 1947 – 2022".

AGC Studios reported strong sales for international distribution at the 2022 Toronto International Film Festival. Powell was joined by Austin Amelio, Retta, and Molly Bernard in October 2022. Filming began in New Orleans in October 2022, and production was completed that November.

== Release ==
Hit Man had its world premiere at the 80th Venice International Film Festival on September 5, 2023. It was followed afterward by its North American premiere at the 2023 Toronto International Film Festival (TIFF) on September 11. It also screened at the 2023 BFI London Film Festival on October 6, 2023.

Netflix acquired distribution rights to the film in the US, UK, Ireland, Australia, New Zealand, India, South Korea, Hong Kong, Malaysia, Vietnam, Indonesia, Singapore, Philippines, and Iceland for $20 million at TIFF, making it the largest film deal of the festival and of 2023, with plans for a theatrical release as well. It was released in select theaters in the United States on May 24, 2024, before streaming on Netflix starting on June 7, 2024.

== Reception ==
=== Critical response ===
The film received critical acclaim. (Note: Multiple references:) On the review aggregator website Rotten Tomatoes, 95% of 301 critics' reviews are positive, with an average rating of 8/10. The website's consensus reads: "A deceptively dark thriller that's also loaded with laughs, Hit Man is an outstanding showcase for leading man Glen Powell—and one of the most purely entertaining films of Richard Linklater's career." Metacritic, which uses a weighted average, assigned the film a score of 82 out of 100, based on 55 critics, indicating "universal acclaim".

Writing for The Washington Post, Ty Burr awarded the film four out of four, calling it "a blast of pure pleasure and one of the year's best films". In another positive review, Alissa Wilkinson of The New York Times described Hit Man as "romantic, sexy, hilarious, satisfying and a genuine star-clinching turn for Glen Powell". Wilkinson, along with several other reviewers, remarked on the philosophical questions posed by the film. Peter Bradshaw of The Guardian wrote that the multiple identities assumed by Gary allow both the character and the viewer to consider "the question of whether there is in fact a true 'self', an irreducible core of authentic identity that remains behind when all imitations or influences are removed". Brian Tallerico of RogerEbert.com also described the movie as a "philosophical study of the human capacity to change". However, Zachary Barnes of The Wall Street Journal noted a lack of subtlety, calling Gary's lectures in philosophy class "overly obvious as expressions of the movie's themes". Chris Evangelista of Slashfilm wrote a mixed review in which he described the film as "forgettable, and often uninspired", though he praised the performances.

=== Accolades ===
Award	Date of ceremony	Category	Recipient(s)	Result	Ref.
Astra Midseason Movie Awards	July 3, 2024	Best Picture	Hit Man	Nominated	
Astra Midseason Movie Awards	July 3, 2024	Best Actor	Glen Powell	Won	
Astra Midseason Movie Awards	July 3, 2024	Best Supporting Actress	Adria Arjona	Runner-up	
Astra Midseason Movie Awards	July 3, 2024	Best Screenplay	Glen Powell and Richard Linklater	Runner-up	
SCAD Savannah Film Festival	November 2, 2024	Lifetime Achievement in Screenwriting Award	Richard Linklater	Honored	
Astra Film Awards	December 8, 2024	Best Actor	Glen Powell	Nominated	
Astra Film Awards	December 8, 2024	Best Adapted Screenplay	Glen Powell and Richard Linklater	Nominated	
Greater Western New York Film Critics Association	January 4, 2025	Best Adapted Screenplay	Glen Powell and Richard Linklater	Nominated	
Golden Globe Awards	January 5, 2025	Best Actor in a Motion Picture – Musical or Comedy	Glen Powell	Nominated	
Austin Film Critics Association	January 6, 2025	Best Austin Film	Hit Man	Nominated	
Satellite Awards	January 26, 2025	Best Motion Picture – Comedy or Musical	Hit Man	Nominated	
Satellite Awards	January 26, 2025	Best Actor in a Motion Picture – Comedy or Musical	Glen Powell	Nominated	
Critics' Choice Awards	February 7, 2025	Best Comedy	Hit Man	Nominated	
Artios Awards	February 12, 2025	Feature: Studio or Independent – Comedy	Vicky Boone (casting director) and Liz Kelley (associate casting director)	Nominated	
Writers Guild of America Awards	February 15, 2025	Best Adapted Screenplay	Richard Linklater and Glen Powell	Nominated	
