= Megan Lawless =

American actress (born 2000)

- Lawless in 2025
- Born: April 11, 2000 (age 26); Washington, D.C., U.S.
- Education: University of California, Los Angeles (BA)
- Occupation: Actress
- Years active: 2015–present

Megan Lawless (born April 11, 2000) is an American actress. She starred as Sarah Harper in the 2025 film Obsession.

== Early life and career ==
Lawless was born on April 11, 2000, in Washington, D.C. Her father is Irish-American, and her mother is Taiwanese. She attended South Forsyth High School and the University of California, Los Angeles, earning her BA degree in economics and Chinese. She began acting at the age of 13.

In 2015, Lawless began her screen career, debuting as Heidi in an episode of the MTV teen drama television series Finding Carter. She played Megan-Ann in the film Table 19, and in 2018, she played Maya Yang in the film The Hate U Give. In 2022, she played the recurring role of Riley Anderson in the Hulu biographical crime drama miniseries The Girl from Plainville.

In 2025, Lawless starred as Sarah Harper in the film Obsession, starring along with Michael Johnston, Inde Navarrette, Cooper Tomlinson, and Andy Richter. Before starring in Obsession, she worked part-time as a receptionist at a tennis club. In June 2026, it was announced Lawless would star in Ping, a psychological drama film.

== Filmography ==
=== Film ===
Year	Title	Role	Notes
2017	Table 19	Megan-Ann	
2018	The Hate U Give	Maya Yang	
2024	The Death That Awaits	Nina Ward	
2025	Obsession	Sarah Harper	
2025	Killer Rental	Jenny	
TBA	Ping †	Annie	Post-production
TBA	Crushed †	Joss	Filming
TBA	Preppy †		Filming

=== Television ===
Year	Title	Role	Notes
2015	Finding Carter	Heidi	1 episode
2019	Play by Play	Tracy	5 episodes
2022	The Girl from Plainville	Riley Anderson	2 episodes
