= Ctrl (web series) =

- Genre: Sci Fi, Comedy
- Starring: Tony Hale; Steve Howey; Emy Coligado
- Theme music composer: Cat Jahnke
- Ending theme: "Apple"
- Composer: Cat Jahnke
- Country of origin: United States
- Original language: English
- No. of seasons: 1
- No. of episodes: 10

Production
- Running time: Approx. 5 minutes
- Production companies: SXM inc NBCUniversal Digital Studio

Original release
- Network: NBC.com
- Release: July 14 – August 25, 2009

Ctrl is an American comedy web series by NBC. It is the first stand-alone web series launched by a major television network. The series stars Tony Hale as a typical office-working, self-confidence-lacking nerd who discovers he can undo things (as well as employ other keyboard functions) in real life. It is an adaptation and expansion of the short film Ctrl Z by Robert Kirbyson, which was a winner at the 2008 Sundance Film Festival.

CTRL was spotted and developed by SXM from the original short film Ctrl Z, which was screened at the Sundance Film Festival in 2008. SXM ultimately partnered with NBC's digital studio to produce the online series. By 2012, the episodes were no longer on the NBC website, and was removed from Hulu sometime later.

== Cast ==
- Tony Hale as Stuart Grundy
- Steve Howey as Ben Piller
- Emy Coligado as Elizabeth
- Edgar Morais as Jeremy
- Richard Karn as Arthur Piller
- Scott L. Schwartz as a security guard

== Episodes ==
| No. | Title | Original release date |
|---|---|---|
| 1 | "Ctrl" | July 14, 2009 |
After his boss spills Nestea on his computer keyboard, Stuart discovers he can change the reality of his office with it. Featured Keystroke: General Functions
| 2 | "Ctrl B" | July 15, 2009 |
Stuart presses Ctrl+B and is empowered to confront his immature boss. Featured Keystroke: Bold
| 3 | "Ctrl Z" | July 16, 2009 |
Stuart breaks into his office after being fired to find that his old, sticky keyboard has been replaced. Featured Keystroke: Undo
| 4 | "F1" | July 21, 2009 |
Stuart lets Elizabeth in on the secret of his magical keyboard. Featured Keystroke: Help
| 5 | "Ctrl C, Ctrl V" | July 28, 2009 |
There are three copies of Stuart wandering around the office. Featured Keystroke: Copy and Paste
| 6 | "Ctrl Home" | August 4, 2009 |
The three "Stuarts" cause problems for Stuart and Elizabeth. Things get worse when CTRL sends Elizabeth back to the Philippines. Featured Keystroke: Go to the Beginning
| 7 | "Ctrl X" | August 11, 2009 |
Ben is now aware of the keyboard's power, and Stuart has to find a way to keep him from taking it for himself. Featured Keystroke: Actual command is Cut, episode erroneously uses it as Send to Recycle Bin
| 8 | "Ctrl Zzzzzzzzzz" | August 11, 2009 |
Stuart replaces the missing 'Z' key with one from another keyboard, but it jams and takes him all the way back to his first day on the job. Featured Keystroke: Repeated Undos
| 9 | "Ctrl Y" | August 18, 2009 |
After giving some choice advice to a young Ben, Stuart uses Ctrl+Y to move back to the present, only to find that his words have changed history for better - and worse. Featured Keystroke: Redo
| 10 | "Ctrl Alt Delete" | August 25, 2009 |
Stuart considers starting over. Featured Keystroke: Hard Reboot (on modern machines Launches Task Manager, but the older usage is implied); Actual episode only makes use of Pause/Break

== Games ==
There are also two games on the NBC website. The first lets you guess Stuart's password ("MERLIN'S IVORY BEARD") and watch some extra video clips. The second lets you explore Stuart's desktop. You can use Stuart's password from the first game to watch more of the second. By manipulating the flash file by going "back" in the flash file, you can get the option to type in a Username and Password with a submit button below.
