= Cooper Tomlinson =

American actor and YouTuber

- Tomlinson in 2025
- Born: Woodinville, Washington, U.S.
- Occupations: Actor; comedian; producer; screenwriter; YouTuber
- Years active: 2016–present

YouTube information
- Channel: that's a bad idea
- Genres: Sketch comedy; cringe comedy; horror comedy
- Subscribers: 1.62 million
- Views: 827 million
- Last updated: August 8, 2026

Cooper Tomlinson is an American actor, comedian, filmmaker, and YouTuber. He co-created the sketch comedy YouTube channel "that's a bad idea", with Curry Barker. Tomlinson starred in and co-produced the 2024 film Milk & Serial with Barker, and co-produced and starred as Ian in Barker's 2025 film Obsession. He also starred in, co-wrote, and executive produced the upcoming film Anything but Ghosts.

== Early life and career ==
Tomlinson was born in Woodinville, Washington. He studied at the New York Film Academy campus in Los Angeles, California. There, he met Curry Barker, a fellow student at the academy. He began making videos together with Barker on YouTube, which they described as "our film school outside of film school". After they formed the sketch comedy channel "that's a bad idea", Barker and Tomlinson dropped out of the academy and moved in together.

They created and published numerous comedy sketches and short films on their YouTube channel and TikTok. In 2024, he and Barker made their feature film debut with Milk & Serial starred in and co-produced the film with Barker, a slasher film with a budget of $800 that was released for free on YouTube.

After the success of Milk & Serial, Tomlinson began co-writing and producing Obsession with Barker. He starred as Ian in the film, starring along with Michael Johnston, Inde Navarrette, Megan Lawless, and Andy Richter. The film was a massive critical and commercial success. Largely by word-of-mouth, the film grossed $519 million on a budget of $750,000.

Tomlinson began co-writing and executive producing Barker's upcoming film Anything but Ghosts. He is set to star in the film. The film is set to be released by Focus Features on May 7, 2027.

== Filmography ==
=== Film ===
Year	Title	Role	Notes	Ref.
2019	Aberdeen	Connor Corie	Also associate producer	
2019	Real World	Brant Phillip	Short film	
2020	Meanwhile Outside the Bank	Scott	Short film	
2021	Drywall	Jason	Short film	
2023	Enigma	Adam	Short film; also co-producer and writer	
2023	Warnings	Kendal Troy	Short film; also producer	
2024	That's a Bad Idea		Music video	
2024	Milk & Serial	Steven "Seven"	Also co-producer and cinematographer	
2025	Fly Me to the Earth	Angus	Short film; also co-writer and co-producer	
2025	My Dead Dad's Funeral	Jason	Short film	
2025	Obsession	Ian	Also associate producer	
2026	The Incident Report	Brett Matthews	Short film	
2027	Anything but Ghosts	Eddy	Post-production; also co-writer and executive producer	

=== Web series ===
Year	Title	Role	Notes	Ref.
2018–2019; on hiatus	Roommates	Chad Churchill	Main cast, also writer	
2024; on hiatus	Privately Investigated	Benji	Main cast, also co-creator	

=== Television series ===
Year	Title	Role	Notes	Ref.
2026	Dutton Ranch	Deputy Cecil Post	2 episodes	
