= Lindsay Hansen Park =

American Mormon feminist blogger and podcaster

- Born: 1982 (age 43–44)
- Occupations: Activist; writer; podcaster
- Children: 3
- Website: www.yearofpolygamy.com

Lindsay Hansen Park (born 1982) is an American Mormon feminist, writer, podcaster, and executive director of the Salt Lake City-based Sunstone Education Foundation. She is best known as the creator and host of the podcast Year of Polygamy, which examines the history of Mormon polygamy, with particular attention to the experiences of women.

Park has self-identified as an "Independent Mormon".

== Early life ==
Park was raised in the Church of Jesus Christ of Latter-day Saints in the Salt Lake Valley. Her mother was a public historian who spoke on pioneer history. Park resides in Salt Lake City with her family.

== Career and activism ==
Park co-founded Utah for Congo, an organization raising awareness about sexual violence in the Democratic Republic of the Congo. She also served as Director of Counseling Services for the Whitefields Education Foundation, which provided counseling and resources for Latter-day Saints experiencing disruptions in religious identity.

Park wrote for Feminist Mormon Housewives under the pseudonym "Winterbuzz" and hosted the site's podcast. Her work and commentary have been referenced in The Wall Street Journal, The Salt Lake Tribune, Salt Lake City Weekly, The Guardian, and Quartz.

As executive director of the Sunstone Education Foundation, Park has been credited with helping broaden the organization's magazine readership and annual conference attendance.

=== Year of Polygamy ===
In 2014, Park founded the Year of Polygamy podcast. The podcast began with biographical episodes about women sealed to Joseph Smith and later expanded to cover the history of plural marriage in the Latter Day Saint movement and its continuation among Mormon fundamentalist groups.

The podcast was referenced in a New York Times article on Leslie Olpin Petersen's Forgotten Wives series of paintings.

=== Media consulting ===
Park worked as a consultant on the television series Under the Banner of Heaven and the Netflix limited series American Primeval.

== Podcasts ==
Year	Title	Host	Notes
2012–2014	Feminist Mormon Housewives Official Podcast	Self	124 episodes
2014–2024	Year of Polygamy	Self	195 episodes
2019–2026	Sunstone Mormon History Podcast	Self	165 episodes
2021	Was I in a Cult?	Liz Iacuzzi and Tyler Measom	Episode: "The Order: 'Feel Like a Number'"; Credited as producer

== Filmography ==
Year	Title	Role	Producer	Consultant	Notes
2018	Warren Jeffs: Prophet of Evil	Self (Polygamy historian)	No	No	TV documentary
2022	Under the Banner of Heaven	—	No	Yes	7 episodes; Historical and cultural consultant
2024	Daughters of the Cult	Self	Yes	Yes	3 episodes
2025	American Primeval	—	No	Yes	6 episodes; Historical consultant
2025	How I Escaped My Cult	Self (Historian)	No	No	Episode: "Yearning for Zion/FLDS"
