= Wyatt Russell =

American actor and ice hockey player (born 1986)

- Russell in 2026
- Born: Wyatt Hawn Russell; July 10, 1986 (age 40); Los Angeles, California, U.S.
- Occupations: Actor; hockey player
- Years active: 1987–present
- Spouses: Sanne Hamers (m. 2012; div. 2017) Meredith Hagner (m. 2019)
- Children: 2
- Parents: Kurt Russell; Goldie Hawn
- Relatives: Oliver Hudson (half-brother); Kate Hudson (half-sister); Bing Russell (grandfather); Matt Franco (cousin)
Ice hockey career
- Height: 186 cm (6 ft 1 in)
- Weight: 85 kg (187 lb; 13 st 5 lb)
- Position: Goaltender
- Played for: EHC Timmendorfer Strand; Groningen Grizzlies
- Playing career: 2009–2010

Wyatt Hawn Russell (born July 10, 1986) is an American actor and former professional ice hockey goaltender. Since 2021, he has played John Walker / U.S. Agent in the Marvel Cinematic Universe media franchise, beginning with the Disney+ series The Falcon and the Winter Soldier (2021).

Russell has starred in various films including 22 Jump Street (2014), Everybody Wants Some!! (2016), Goon: Last of the Enforcers (2017), Overlord (2018), Night Swim (2024) and Disclosure Day (2026). Russell also had starring roles in television shows including Black Mirror (2016), Lodge 49 (2018–2019), and Monarch: Legacy of Monsters (2023–present).

== Early life ==
Wyatt Russell was born on July 10, 1986, in Los Angeles, California, to actors Goldie Hawn and Kurt Russell. He is a grandson of the late character actor Bing Russell, paternal half-brother of Boston Russell, and maternal half-brother of Oliver Hudson and Kate Hudson.

== Career ==
=== Ice hockey ===
A goaltender, Russell played junior hockey for the Richmond Sockeyes, Langley Hornets, Coquitlam Express, Chicago Steel, and Brampton Capitals before enrolling to play collegiate hockey for the Chargers at the University of Alabama in Huntsville. He moved to Europe in 2009, playing professional hockey for EHC Timmendorfer Strand in the German Regionalliga and the Groningen Grizzlies in the Dutch Eredivisie. His pro hockey career was cut short in 2010 due to injuries.

=== Acting ===
In 2013, Russell appeared in Love and Honor and We Are What We Are. In December 2013, it was announced that he was cast as Duane Allman in Randall Miller's Midnight Rider, a biopic of Gregg Allman. He also appeared in the 2014 film 22 Jump Street. In 2016, he co-starred in a film that premiered at the Tribeca Film Festival called Folk Hero & Funny Guy and starred in "Playtest", an episode of the anthology series Black Mirror. In 2017, he starred in Goon: Last of the Enforcers as Anders Cain, the captain of minor league hockey team the Halifax Highlanders.

In 2018, he and Jovan Adepo played the leads in the World War II-set horror film Overlord. In 2021, he starred as John Walker in the Disney+ series The Falcon and the Winter Soldier. He reprised the role in the 2025 film Thunderbolts* and will appear in the 2026 film Avengers: Doomsday.

In 2022, Russell took on the role of real-life murderer Dan Lafferty in the FX on Hulu miniseries Under the Banner of Heaven. In July 2022, he joined his father in Apple TV+ and Legendary Television's Godzilla series, Monarch: Legacy of Monsters which is set in the world of Legendary's MonsterVerse franchise.

Russell starred in the 2024 supernatural film Night Swim. He also starred in Steven Spielberg's Disclosure Day (2026).

== Personal life ==
In 2012, Russell married stylist Sanne Hamers, whom he met in the Netherlands while playing hockey. The couple separated in 2015 and divorced in 2017. Russell began a relationship with actress Meredith Hagner in 2015 after meeting her on the set of the film Folk Hero & Funny Guy. They married in 2019. They have two sons, Buddy Prine and Boone Joseph, born in March 2021 and February 2024.

Russell was a goaltender for the 2022 NHL All-Star Game's breakaway challenge.

Russell co-founded Lake Hour, a premium sparkling cocktail brand, with film producer Richard Peete in 2023.

== Filmography ==
=== Film ===
Year	Title	Role	Notes
1987	Overboard	Baby at Golf Course	Uncredited
1996	Escape from L.A.	Orphan Boy	Uncredited
1998	Soldier	Todd (age 11)	
2006	The Last Supper	Doubting Thomas	Short film
2010	High School	Drug PSA Stoned Teenager	
2011	Cowboys & Aliens	Little Mickey	
2012	This Is 40	Flirty Hockey Player	
2013	We Are What We Are	Deputy Anders	
2013	Love and Honor	Topher Lincoln	
2014	22 Jump Street	Zook Haythe	
2014	Cold in July	Freddy Russell	
2014	At the Devil's Door	Sam	
2015	Prisoner	Will	Short film
2016	Everybody Wants Some!!	Charlie Willoughby	
2016	Folk Hero & Funny Guy	Jason	
2017	Ingrid Goes West	Ezra O'Keefe	
2017	Table 19	Teddy	
2017	Goon: Last of the Enforcers	Anders Cain	
2017	Shimmer Lake	Ed Burton	
2018	Blaze	Glyn	
2018	Overlord	Corporal Lewis Ford	
2021	The Woman in the Window	David Winter	
2024	Night Swim	Ray Waller	
2025	You're Cordially Invited	Masked Dancer Host	Cameo
2025	Thunderbolts*	John F. Walker / U.S. Agent	
2025	Broke	True Brandywine	Also producer
2026	Disclosure Day	Jackson	
2026	Avengers: Doomsday †	John F. Walker / U.S. Agent	Post-production

=== Television ===
Year	Title	Role	Notes
2010	Law & Order: LA	Sam Loomis	Episode: "Hollywood"
2013	Arrested Development	Oakwood	Episode: "Colony Collapse"
2013	The Walking Dead: The Oath	Paul	3 episodes
2016	Black Mirror	Cooper Redfield	Episode: "Playtest"
2018–2019	Lodge 49	Sean "Dud" Dudley	20 episodes
2020	The Good Lord Bird	J. E. B. Stuart	3 episodes
2021	The Falcon and the Winter Soldier	John F. Walker / Captain America / U.S. Agent	Main role, miniseries; 6 episodes
2021	Marvel Studios: Assembled	Himself	Episode: "Assembled: The Making of The Falcon and the Winter Soldier"
2022	Under the Banner of Heaven	Dan Lafferty	Main role, miniseries; 7 episodes
2023–present	Monarch: Legacy of Monsters	Lee Shaw (young)	11 episodes
2024	What If...?	John F. Walker / U.S. Agent (voice)	Episode: "What If... 1872?"
2025	Marvel Zombies	John F. Walker / U.S. Agent (voice)	Episode: "Episode 2"

== Awards and nominations ==
Year	Award	Category	Work	Result	Ref.
2014	Teen Choice Awards	Choice Movie: Breakout Star	22 Jump Street	Nominated	
2021	Hollywood Critics Association TV Awards	Best Supporting Actor in a Streaming Series, Drama	The Falcon and the Winter Soldier	Nominated	
2021	Gold Derby Awards	Drama Supporting Actor	The Falcon and the Winter Soldier	Nominated	
2021	OFTA Television Awards	Best Supporting Actor in a Drama Series	The Falcon and the Winter Soldier	Nominated	
2022	Hollywood Critics Association TV Awards	Best Supporting Actor in a Streaming Limited or Anthology Series	Under the Banner of Heaven	Nominated	
2025	Saturn Awards	Best Actor in a Television Series	Monarch: Legacy of Monsters	Nominated	
