= Your Place or Mine (film) =

2023 film by Aline Brosh McKenna

- Official release poster
- Directed by: Aline Brosh McKenna
- Written by: Aline Brosh McKenna
- Produced by: Jason Bateman; Michael Costigan; Reese Witherspoon; Lauren Neustadter; Aline Brosh McKenna
- Starring: Reese Witherspoon; Ashton Kutcher; Jesse Williams; Zoë Chao; Wesley Kimmel; Tig Notaro; Steve Zahn
- Cinematography: Florian Ballhaus
- Edited by: Chris A. Peterson
- Music by: Siddhartha Khosla
- Production companies: Aggregate Films; Lean Machine; Hello Sunshine
- Distributed by: Netflix
- Release date: February 10, 2023
- Running time: 111 minutes
- Country: United States
- Language: English

Your Place or Mine is a 2023 American romantic comedy film written and directed by Aline Brosh McKenna in her directorial debut. The film stars Reese Witherspoon (who also produced) and Ashton Kutcher as best friends who end up swapping houses for a week. Jesse Williams, Zoë Chao, Wesley Kimmel, Tig Notaro, and Steve Zahn also star.

The film was released on Netflix on February 10, 2023. It received mixed reviews from critics, who criticized the lack of chemistry between Witherspoon and Kutcher.

== Plot ==
In Los Angeles in 2003, after an evening of playing poker with another couple, Debbie Dunn and Peter Coleman have sex and spend the night together in her home.

Twenty years later, Debbie and Peter are best friends. He has moved to NYC and become a successful businessman, while she still lives in Los Angeles and works as an accountant at her son Jack's middle school.

Debbie calls Peter on his birthday, and they discuss her plans to head to NYC soon to complete an accounting program to help her get a better-paying job. Debbie's ex-husband's actress girlfriend, Scarlet, is to watch Jack for the week but flakes when she is offered a role in Vancouver for two weeks. Peter, who has just broken up with his girlfriend and is between jobs, offers to go to LA to take care of Jack.

In California, Peter learns the extent of Debbie's overprotective parenting and decides to help Jack loosen up a little. He gets skybox tickets to a Los Angeles Kings game and encourages Jack to invite along two classmates, but this goes awry when they ignore him.

Meanwhile in NYC, Debbie meets Peter's ex-girlfriend Minka, who invites her out for drinks and attends her accounting classes. At the bar, Minka helps her catch the attention of book publisher Theo Martin. Later, she also shows Debbie Peter's unpublished novel he had hidden in his apartment. After reading the manuscript, Debbie pretends to be a freelance editor as she tries to convince Theo to give it a chance.

Peter grows closer to Jack and convinces the hockey coach to let him try out for the team. Meanwhile, Debbie goes out on a date with Theo, which ends with them spending the night together. Debbie accidentally sets off the apartment's remote camera, leading to Peter witnessing them. Disturbed, he goes to a bar to meet with an old girlfriend but cannot bring himself to sleep with her. That's when Peter realizes that he is in love with Debbie.

Back at Debbie's, Peter talks about his relationship with Debbie with their mutual friend Alicia. She encourages him to finally act on his feelings for her rather than repress them again, as he's been doing for decades.

On Debbie's last day in NYC, she passes her exam and unintentionally discovers Peter's hidden mementos of her. When Debbie meets with Theo, he tells her he has gotten her an interview with Macmillan so they could potentially date. However, she confesses that she is in love with someone else.

In LA, Jack's hockey tryout goes well, but he ends up injured. Peter calls Debbie, and she is enraged that he endangered her son, even though Jack appears okay. She rushes to leave and get back home to her son, telling Peter to be gone before she arrives.

Peter and Debbie come face-to-face at LAX. After a heated argument, he declares that he is deeply in love with her, and has been since they met, and they kiss passionately. Six months later, they are married, Peter has become a published author and moved in with them in California. She is an editor at an indie publishing house, and Jack is on the hockey team.

== Cast ==
- Reese Witherspoon as Debbie Dunn
- Ashton Kutcher as Peter Coleman
- Zoë Chao as Minka
- Jesse Williams as Theo Martin
- Wesley Kimmel as Jack
- Tig Notaro as Alicia
- Steve Zahn as Zen
- Rachel Bloom as Scarlet
- Griffin Matthews as Professor Golden
- Vella Lovell as Becca
- Shiri Appleby as Vanessa
- Michael Hitchcock as Alex

== Production ==
=== Development ===
The film was announced in May 2020 with Netflix distributing the film, which stars Reese Witherspoon, and is written and directed by Aline Brosh McKenna in her feature directorial debut.

In August 2021, Ashton Kutcher joined the cast. In October 2021, it was announced Jesse Williams, Tig Notaro, Zoë Chao, Steve Zahn and Wesley Kimmel had joined the cast.

=== Filming ===
Principal photography began in October 2021. Filming locations included Montague Street in Brooklyn.

== Release ==
Your Place or Mine was released on February 10, 2023, by Netflix.

Between its release and June 2023, the film totaled 163 million hours watched (equal to 88.1 million views).

== Reception ==
On the review aggregator website Rotten Tomatoes, 31% of 111 critics' reviews are positive, with an average rating of 4.6/10. The website's consensus reads: "Well-cast but lacking much of a spark, Your Place or Mine hits the standard genre beats just competently enough to remind the viewer of countless superior alternatives." Metacritic, which uses a weighted average, assigned the film a score of 49 out of 100, based on 26 critics, indicating "mixed or average" reviews.

Decider's Anna Menta unfavorably compared the film to Sleepless in Seattle, noting as flaws for Your Place or Mine the lack of chemistry between its lead actors, the unnatural feel of the split-screen dialogues, and an apparent absence of tension in the build-up to the pair's eventual reunion.
