= Preppy (film) =

- Directed by: Janicza Bravo
- Written by: David Levine; Rose Lichter-Marck
- Produced by: Jason Bateman; Michael Costigan; John Buderwitz; Peter Coleman; Paula Manzanedo; Janicza Bravo
- Starring: Kit Connor; Diana Silvers; Talia Ryder; Elizabeth Marvel; Bill Camp; Megan Lawless; Lili Taylor
- Production companies: Aggregate Films; STX Entertainment
- Country: United States
- Language: English

Preppy (stylized as PRƎPPY) is an upcoming American crime drama thriller film directed and produced by Janicza Bravo. The film stars Kit Connor, Diana Silvers, Talia Ryder, Elizabeth Marvel, Bill Camp, Megan Lawless, and Lili Taylor.

== Cast ==
- Kit Connor
- Diana Silvers
- Talia Ryder
- Elizabeth Marvel
- Bill Camp
- Megan Lawless
- Lili Taylor
- Gideon Adlon
- Jaeden Martell
- James Wilkie Broderick
- Jaya Harper
- Jahi Winston
- Alex Consani
- Cydney Kutcipal
- Morris Monaco Collins

== Production ==
In September 2026, it was announced that Janicza Bravo would direct and produce a new film that stars Kit Connor and Diana Silvers, with Jason Bateman and Michael Costigan producing through their production company Aggregate Films, as well as Peter Coleman and Paula Manzanedo also producing through STX Entertainment. In October, Talia Ryder, Elizabeth Marvel, Bill Camp, Megan Lawless, Lili Taylor, and newest additions were added to the cast while filming began production in the same month in Manhattan.
