= Aggregate Films =

American motion picture production company

Aggregate Films, Inc.
- Type: Private
- Industry: Motion picture; Television
- Founded: February 1, 2012; 14 years ago
- Founder: Jason Bateman
- Headquarters: Los Angeles, California, United States
- Key people: Jason Bateman (Founder and Partner); Michael Costigan (Partner); John Buderwitz (Vice President of Film)
- Products: Film Production; Television Production
- Website: aggregatefilms.com

Aggregate Films, Inc. is an American motion picture and television production company founded by actor Jason Bateman, who runs the company with producer Michael Costigan. The company includes Identity Thief, Bad Words (both 2013), The Family Fang (2016), Ozark (2017-2022), Game Night (2018), Under the Banner of Heaven (2022), Your Place or Mine, and Hit Man (both 2023).

== History ==
In February 2012, it was announced that Jason Bateman had launched a production company Aggregate Films which it previously had a two-year first-look producing deal with Universal Pictures and Universal Television. Bateman hired Jim Garavente to run the company.

In 2014, Shaleen Desai was tapped to serve for Aggregate's television division as an executive producer while the production company has inked their new first-look film and television deal to keep the company in business with Universal, until he was hired for the newly creative role as a Vice President Scripted Programming to work with the creative community to generate ideas for new programming concepts and characters, and all aspects of scripted production by CMT in 2016. In 2015, Bateman brought on Aaron Schmidt as the Co-head of Development for the production company that was based at Universal, until he was hired by KatzSmith Productions as a Senior Vice President to oversee development for the film and television divisions moving to their production company from Aggregate two years later. Their first-look deal with Universal was extended for another two years through the end of 2017.

In 2018, Bateman partnered with Michael Costigan to head Aggregate, forming a first-look, multiyear deal with Netflix to generate film and TV projects. The company currently has a first-look deal with Netflix to generate film and television projects.

In March 2021, Roxie Rodriguez was hired to serve as Vice President of Television as well as Emma Ho as Director of Development for unscripted to expands It’s business beyond scripted programming for the production company. In January 2024, Aggregate Films hired John Buderwitz to serve as Vice President of Film to work through creative development and production to oversee the company's growing slate of feature films after leaving an eight-year stint for Steven Spielberg's Amblin Partners.

== Filmography ==
=== Feature films ===
Year	Title	Director(s)	Co-production	Distributor	Notes
2013	Identity Thief	Seth Gordon	Relativity Media; Bluegrass Films	Universal Pictures	
2013	Bad Words	Jason Bateman	Darko Entertainment; MXN Entertainment	Focus Features	
2016	The Family Fang	Jason Bateman	Red Crown Productions; Olympus Pictures; Blossom Films; West Madison Entertainment; Minerva Productions; QED International	Starz Distribution	
2018	Game Night	John Francis Daley; Jonathan Goldstein	New Line Cinema; Davis Entertainment	Warner Bros. Pictures	
2023	Your Place or Mine	Aline Brosh McKenna	Lean Machine; Hello Sunshine	Netflix	
2023	Hell of a Summer	Finn Wolfhard; Billy Bryk	30West; Kid Brother Productions	Neon	
2023	Hit Man	Richard Linklater	AGC Studios; S.H. Pictures; Monarch Media; Barnstorm Co. Cinetic Media; Detour Filmproduction	Netflix	
2026	Evil Genius	Courteney Cox	August Night	TBA	
TBA	The Cackling of the Dodos	Jason Bateman	Children at Play; Untitled Entertainment	Netflix	
TBA	Preppy	Janicza Bravo	STX Entertainment	TBA	

=== Documentaries ===
Year	Title	Director	Other notes
2026	Primetime Preacher$	Joe Berlinger	Completed
TBA	superfans: screaming. crying. throwing up.	Gia Coppola	Post-production

=== Television ===
Title	First aired	Last aired	Co-production	Network	Notes
Growing Up Fisher	February 23, 2014	June 11, 2014	Next Thing You Know Productions; Universal Television	NBC	
Ozark	July 21, 2017	April 29, 2022	MRC Television; Headhunter Films; Zero Gravity Management; Man, Woman & Child Productions	Netflix	
Kidding	September 9, 2018	March 8, 2020	Showtime Networks; I Love You Julian! Some Kind of Garden	Showtime	
The Outsider	January 12, 2020	March 8, 2020	Temple Hill Entertainment; Civic Center Media; Pieface Inc. MRC Television; HBO Entertainment	HBO	
A Teacher	November 10, 2020	December 29, 2020	FXP; Hola Fidel	FX on Hulu	
Under the Banner of Heaven	April 28, 2022	June 2, 2022	FXP; Imagine Television; Hungry Jackal Productions	FX on Hulu	
Outlast	March 10, 2023	present	Nomad Entertainment	Netflix	
Florida Man	April 13, 2023		Donald Todd Productions	Netflix	
Based on a True Story	June 8, 2023	November 21, 2024	Universal Content Productions; Overlook Productions; Parasox	Peacock	
Lessons in Chemistry	October 13, 2023	November 24, 2023	The Great Unknown Productions; Piece of Work Entertainment; Apple Studios	Apple TV+	
Black Rabbit	September 18, 2025		Youngblood Pictures; Riff Raff Entertainment; Range; Colossal Productions	Netflix	
DTF St. Louis	March 1, 2026	April 12, 2026	Elephant Pictures; Bravo Axolotl; Escape Artists; MGM Television; HBO	HBO	
The Marriage Plot	TBA		Borderless Pictures; Chum Films; A24; FX Productions	FX; FX on Hulu	
