= Milk & Serial =

2024 horror film by Curry Barker

- YouTube thumbnail
- Directed by: Curry Barker
- Written by: Curry Barker
- Produced by: Cooper Tomlinson; Curry Barker
- Starring: Curry Barker; Cooper Tomlinson
- Cinematography: Curry Barker; Cooper Tomlinson
- Edited by: Curry Barker
- Music by: Curry Barker
- Production company: That's a Bad Idea,LLC.
- Distributed by: That's a Bad Idea (via YouTube)
- Release date: August 8, 2024
- Running time: 62 minutes
- Country: United States
- Language: English
- Budget: $800

Milk & Serial (Note: Stylized as "MILK & SERIAL (FOUND FOOTAGE HORROR FILM DIRECTED BY CURRY BARKER)" on YouTube in all caps) is a 2024 American found footage slasher film written and directed by Curry Barker, in his directorial debut. It stars Barker and Cooper Tomlinson, the comedy duo from YouTube sketch comedy channel "that's a bad idea". (Note: Stylized in lower case) The film follows two pranksters as they attempt to prank each other only for the situation to dramatically spiral out of control. With a budget of $800, the duo made it in four months. After failing to find a film distributor, Barker decided to release the film on YouTube for free. Milk & Serial was released on August 8, 2024. It received positive reviews from critics.

== Plot ==
Best friends and roommates Marshall "Milk" and Steve "Seven" run Prank Bros, a prank channel, together on YouTube. Before Milk's birthday party at their apartment, Seven films himself buying a gun and blanks to prank him.

The party is attended by several of their friends, including Link, Naomi, and Naomi's girlfriend Lara. During a game of "Never Have I Ever", Milk admits to killing a cat, making everyone else uncomfortable. Seven's improv friend, hired by him for the prank, arrives and shoots Naomi with a blank, impressing Milk. Later, their elderly neighbor Greg knocks to complain about the noise. While returning from a trip to 7-Eleven, the friends see Greg standing motionless on a street corner, which Milk dismisses as another prank.

The next day, Seven and Milk encounter Greg sitting on their couch downstairs. Milk goes to apologize, only to find that Greg has gone upstairs, where he is having a breakdown. Milk calms Greg by promising to have dinner with him, but before they leave, a heartbroken Naomi arrives, claiming Lara broke up with her via text.

Milk and Seven dine with Greg at his apartment, where Greg seemingly drugs them before tying them up and driving them to a remote desert. After Seven shoots Greg in self-defense, Milk reveals that he orchestrated the entire situation as a prank; Greg is a hired actor, and the gun Seven used is the same one from the birthday prank. Seven is thrilled at the prospect of increased viewership from the prank, but his excitement dissipates upon discovering that Greg is actually dead; Seven blames the man who sold him the gun.

Past footage reveals that Milk abducted Lara after the party and tied her up in a secret hideout, then used her phone to break up with Naomi. Milk confesses to the camera that he is jealous of Seven's popularity on their channel, and has come up with an elaborate plan to frame Seven for murder as revenge, which involved swapping the blanks with real bullets.

In the present, Milk gets Seven to bury Greg's body. The next day, Milk gaslights a traumatized Seven and provokes him into beating him. Milk then goes to bludgeon Lara to death. After Greg's son Frank confronts them about Greg's disappearance, they use Greg's phone to make it appear as though Greg has gone to Las Vegas. When this backfires, Milk convinces Seven to go to Frank's house to distract him so Milk can stab him to death. Having had enough of Milk's destructive actions and apparent lack of remorse at having caused the deaths of two people, Seven angrily declares that he is quitting the channel.

Link and Naomi decide to investigate why Seven attacked Milk, and discover a box under Milk's bed filled with vials of blood labeled with different names, including one with Lara's name. The box also contains a key, which leads them to Milk's lair and Lara's corpse.

As Milk tries to clean up the blood, a guilt-ridden Seven begs Milk to either kill him or turn him in. Milk giddily speaks to the camera, explaining to the viewer that he aspires to be remembered as the most creative serial killer in history, and that he believes he has accomplished this goal by not directly killing Seven, but instead creating a series of circumstances that he hopes will lead to Seven committing suicide. Just then, Seven enters and shoots Milk, who subsequently drops the camera. Another gunshot rings out. After the credits roll, the camera is picked up.

== Cast ==
- Curry Barker as Marshall / Milk
- Cooper Tomlinson as Steven / Seven
- Adlih Alvarado as Naomi
- Sterling L. Pope as Link
- Jonnathon Cripple as Greg
- John Simmonds as Frank
- Gloria Karel as Lara
- Andy Dubitsky as Arms Dealer
- Tristan Welsh as Jason
- Paul Santoli as Paul
- Rob Harrow as Cop

Credits adapted from Bloody Disgusting.

== Production and release ==
Curry Barker in 2025

Milk & Serial was made by the comedy duo Curry Barker and Cooper Tomlinson. The duo had previously garnered an audience on YouTube with their sketch comedy channel "that's a bad idea". The channel occasionally released short film projects, including the 2023 viral horror short film "The Chair". Milk & Serial was the duo's first feature in the genre. The budget for Milk & Serial was $800, and was primarily spent on hiring actors and buying a Sony camcorder camera. Milk & Serial was shot over four months, with help from their friends playing other roles and working weekends depending on everyone's availability.

After a year of trying to get a film distributor for Milk & Serial, Barker decided to release the full movie onto YouTube for free. In an interview with Variety, Barker stated that "even though we worked really hard for a year trying to get distribution for this thing, we said screw it and threw it on YouTube." The original runtime submitted to distributors was 80 minutes, but Barker trimmed it down to 62 minutes to better accommodate a YouTube release. Milk & Serial was released on August 8, 2024.

== Reception ==
Milk & Serial received positive reviews from critics. Stuart Heritage of The Guardian praised the story, and said "As a film it's great. There are some incredibly neatly observed moments, such as when the main character describes gaslighting as 'when you prank somebody but make them think it's their fault'." Heritage compared it to other found footage film like The Blair Witch Project, Paranormal Activity, and Rob Savage's Host. Timothy Rawles of iHorror said "Move over Longlegs and Cuckoo, one of the most disturbing movies of the year is actually on YouTube. For free."

Mary McAndrews of Dread Central named Milk & Serial as among the "best found footage films of 2024" and said "It's a simple story supported by some harrowing performances and clever editing." William Earl of Variety said "Curry Barker has delivered the year's most unlikely hit." Yonni Uribe of Slug Mag said "This film is not one to miss if you're a horror nerd with an affinity for found footage." Uribe compared it to other horror internet projects made by Chris Stuckmann and Kane Parsons. Ari Drew of Bloody Disgusting said it is "one of the year's best-kept secrets".
