= Michael Costigan (film producer) =

American film producer

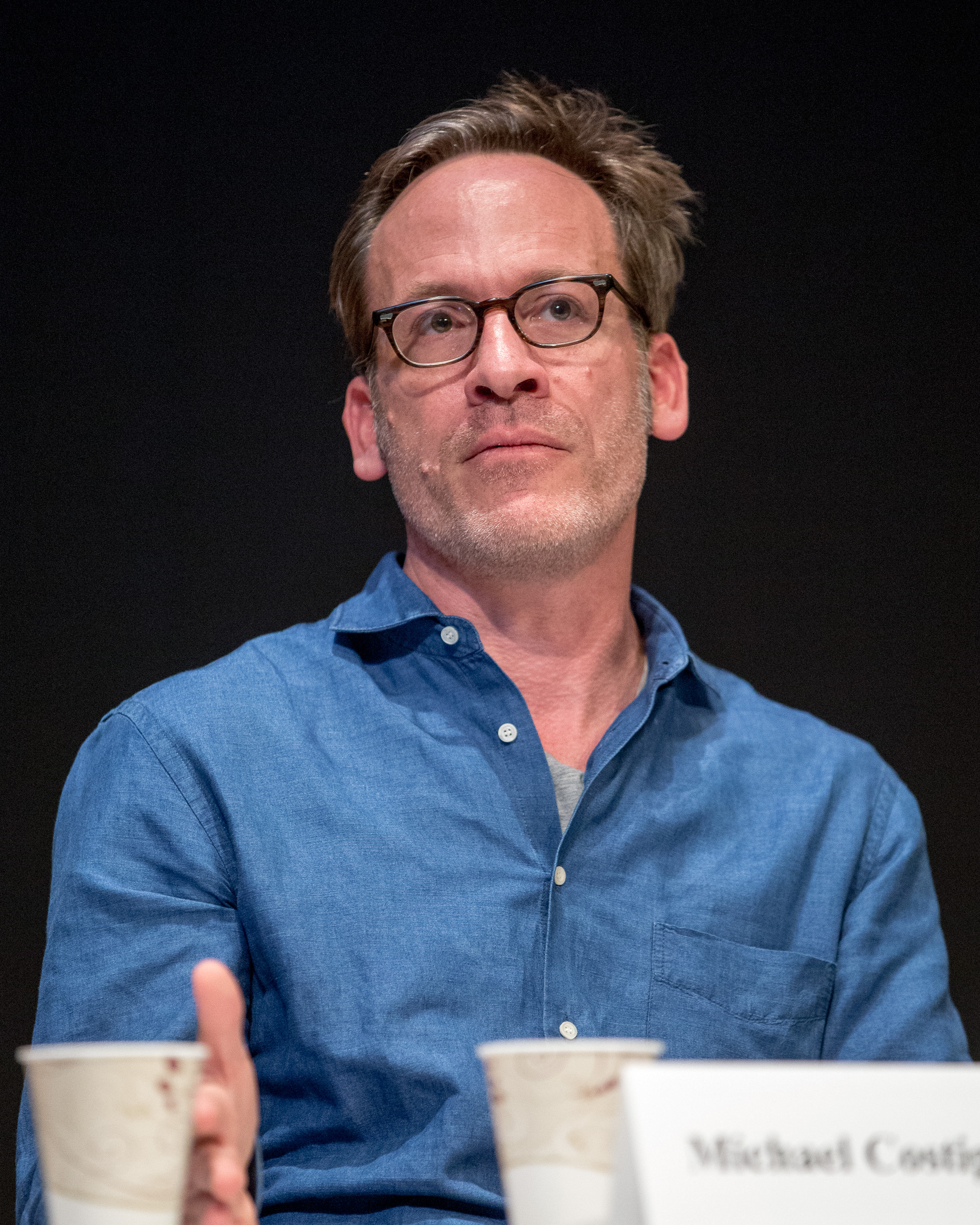
- Costigan in 2015
- Occupations: Film producer, executive producer
- Years active: 1996-present
- Children: Cecile Costigan

Michael Costigan is a film and television producer.

== Biography ==
Costigan graduated from Brown University in 1990. He was a production executive at Columbia Pictures at Sony Pictures Entertainment, where he worked for nine years on films including Bottle Rocket (1996), The People vs. Larry Flynt (1996), Gattaca (1997), Girl, Interrupted (1999), and Charlie's Angels (2000). He left Sony and worked as executive producer on Brokeback Mountain (2005). Costigan started a production company, Corduroy Films, in 2002. He then became president at Scott Free Productions from 2005 to 2012. Costigan left Scott Free to work full-time as a film producer. He started the production company COTA Films and signed a two-year deal with Sony. In 2018, Costigan partnered with the actor Jason Bateman to run Bateman's production company, Aggregate Films.

== Filmography ==
He was a producer in all films unless otherwise noted.

=== Film ===
Year	Film	Credit
2005	Brokeback Mountain	Executive producer
2006	Deck the Halls	
2007	American Gangster	Executive producer
2008	Smart People	
2008	Body of Lies	Executive producer
2009	Tell-Tale	
2009	The Taking of Pelham 123	Executive producer
2009	Cracks	Co-producer
2010	Welcome to the Rileys	
2010	Cyrus	
2010	Robin Hood	Executive producer
2012	Being Flynn	
2012	Prometheus	Executive producer
2013	Stoker	
2013	The East	
2013	The Counselor	Executive producer
2013	Out of the Furnace	
2015	A Bigger Splash	
2017	Ghost in the Shell	
2017	Woodshock	
2018	Dumplin'	
2019	Extremely Wicked, Shockingly Evil and Vile	
2019	Lying and Stealing	
2020	Uncle Frank	
2023	Your Place or Mine	
2023	Hit Man	
2023	Hell of a Summer	
TBA	Imagination	
TBA	The Girls I've Been	
TBA	The Pinkerton	Executive producer
TBA	The Rosie Project	
TBA	The Cackling of the Dodos	
TBA	Preppy	

Thanks

Year	Film	Role
2005	The Puffy Chair	Thanks
2007	The Good Life	Producers gratefully acknowledge the valuable assistance of
2008	Baghead	Thanks

=== Television ===
Year	Title	Credit
2020	The Outsider	Executive producer
2020	A Teacher	Executive producer
2022	Under the Banner of Heaven	Executive producer
2023	Outlast	Executive producer
2023	Florida Man	Executive producer
2023	Lessons in Chemistry	Executive producer
2023−24	Based on a True Story	Executive producer
2025	Black Rabbit	Executive producer
