= Arbery (surname) =

Arbery is a surname. Notable people with the surname include:

- Ahmaud Arbery, man who was killed in Brunswick by Gregory and Travis McMichael
- Glenn Arbery (born 1951), American writer
- Will Arbery, American playwright and screenwriter
