= Mitch and Murray Productions =

Theatre company based in Vancouver, BC, Canada

- Company type: Theatre company
- Founded: 2012
- Founder: Aaron Craven
- Headquarters: Vancouver, BC, Canada
- Website: mitchandmurrayproductions.com

Mitch and Murray Productions is a Canadian theatre company based in Vancouver, British Columbia. Founded in 2012 by Artistic Director Aaron Craven, the company produces contemporary plays. The theatre also hosts acting workshops for the autistic community.

== History ==
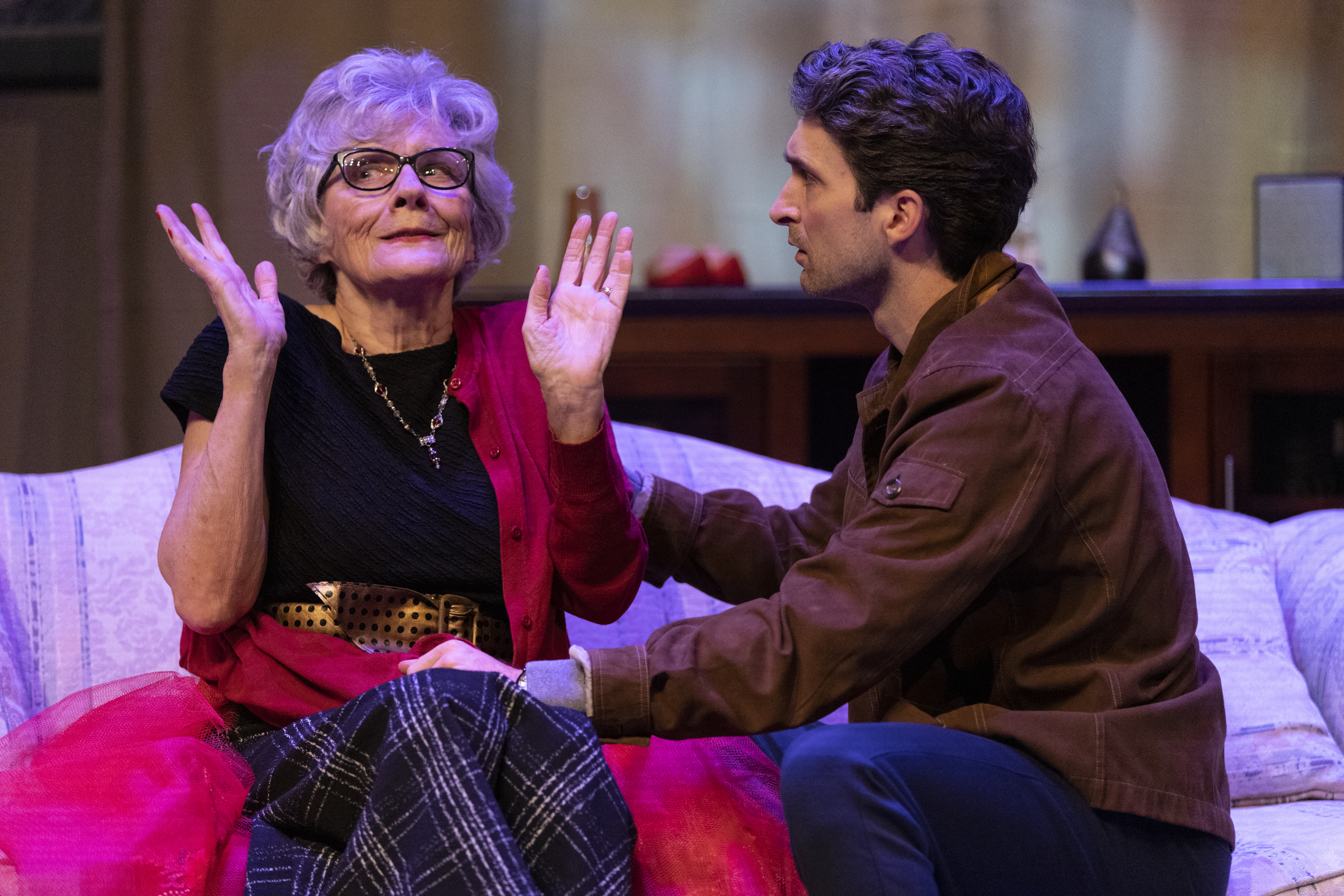
Scene from Instantaneous Blue by Aaron Craven, 2023.

Aaron Craven established Mitch and Murray Productions in 2012 with an aim of introducing contemporary plays to Vancouver. The company is named for two characters in the David Mamet play Glengarry Glen Ross.

The company has staged works by Will Arbery, Mike Bartlett, Duncan Macmillan and David Mamet. Mitch and Murray Productions has been nominated for Jessie Richardson Theatre Awards. In 2023, the company staged the premiere of Craven's play Instantaneous Blue, a semi-autobiographical work about a family's struggles with Alzheimer's disease.

The company also is home to The Working Actors Gym, an acting school in Vancouver, and hosts acting workshops for the autistic community.

== Productions ==
Works staged by the company include:

- Fifty Words by Michael Weller (2011)
- Race by David Mamet (2012)
- Becky Shaw by Gina Gionfriddo (2013)
- Speed-the-Plow by David Mamet (2014)
- Rapture, Blister, Burn by Gina Gionfriddo (2015)
- Detroit by Lisa D’Amour (2016)
- Sex with Strangers by Laura Eason (2018)
- Body Awareness by Annie Baker (2019)
- Lungs by Duncan Macmillan (2020)
- Snowflake by Mike Bartlett (2021)
- Instantaneous Blue by Aaron Craven (2023)
- An Intervention by Mike Bartlett (2024)
- Heroes of the Fourth Turning by Will Arbery (2025)
