= Elisabeth Dieudonné Vincent =

19th-century Haitian free woman of colour

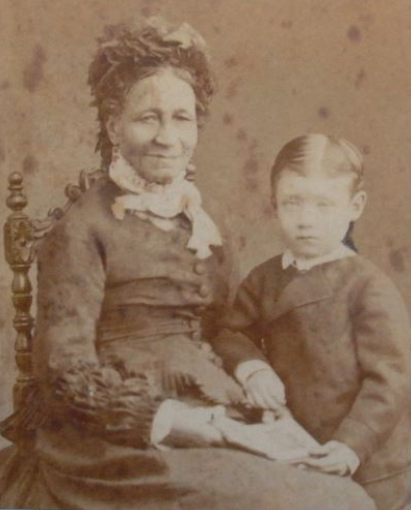
- Vincent
- Born: Elizabeth Dieudonné; 1798; Jérémie, Saint-Domingue
- Died: 1883 (aged 84–85); Antwerp, Belgium
- Other names: Élisabeth Dieudonné, Élisabeth Dieudonné Tinchant, Elisabeth Vincent, Elizabeth Dieudonné Vincent, Elizabeth Tinchant

Elisabeth Dieudonné Vincent (1798 – 29 November 1883) was a Saint Dominican Creole, businesswoman and international migrant. Born in 1798 in Saint-Domingue to an affranchie mother and a French father, she was illegitimate, although her father did acknowledge her. In 1803, the family fled from the violence of the Haitian Revolution to Santiago de Cuba, where they completed paperwork to show that they were free. In 1809, when the Spanish authorities expelled French colonists because of the Peninsular War in Europe, she moved to New Orleans in Louisiana.

Vincent married in 1822 and with her husband, Jacques Tinchant, operated a business in New Orleans. The couple also earned money by renting out Vincent's slaves. In 1835 she amended her original marriage record in order to acquire a surname, removing the double stigma of illegitimacy and slave ancestry. Experiencing racial inequality and increasing restrictions as a result of the demanding Black Codes in the United States, they moved with their family to France, where they operated a dairy and vineyards in Gan. Poor economic conditions and violence during the French Revolution of 1848 prompted the family to relocate to Antwerp in 1857, where they invested in their sons' new tobacco business.

== Early life and family ==
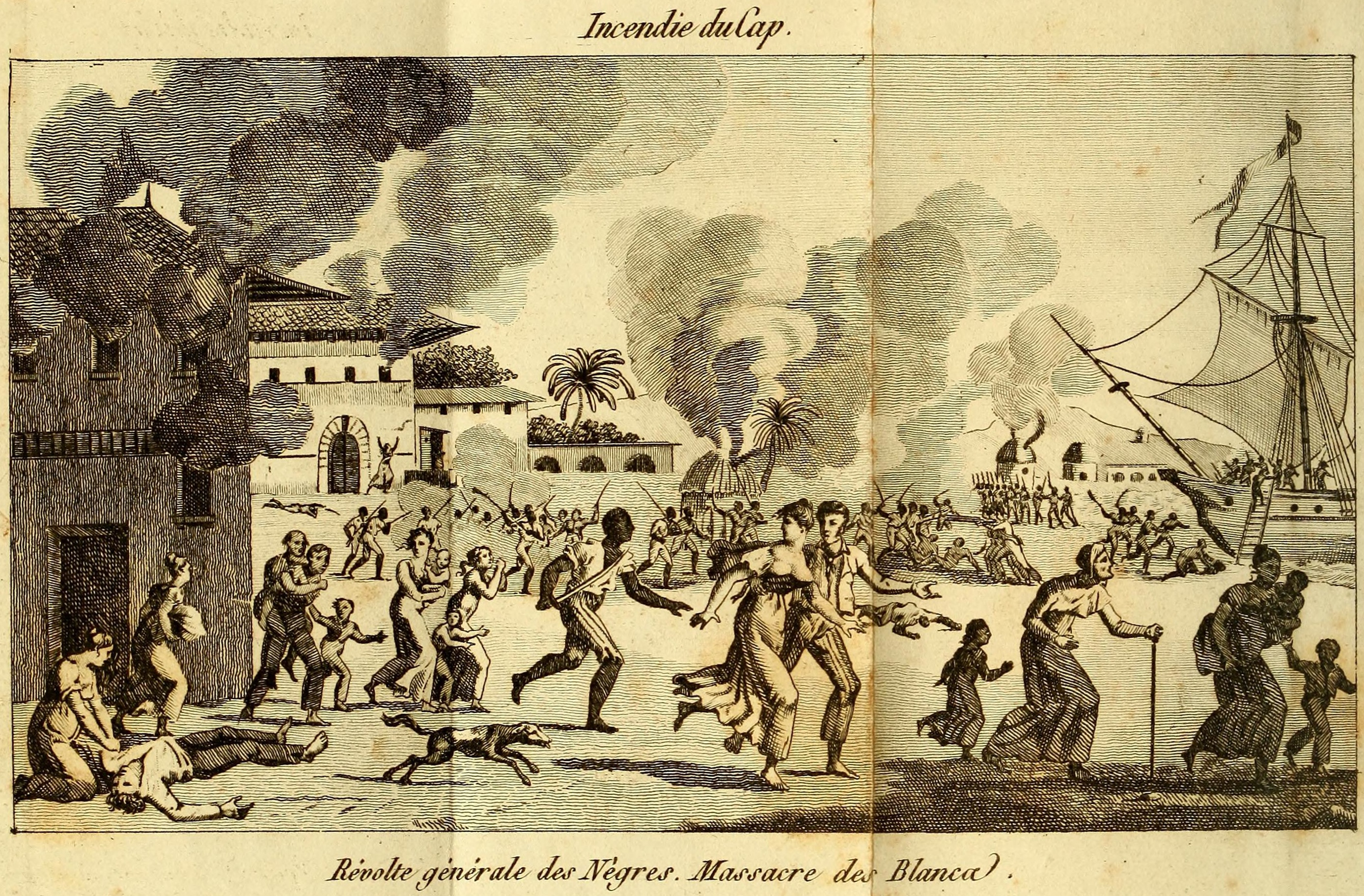
Refugees fleeing the violence in Saint-Domingue during the revolution

Elisabeth Dieudonné was born in 1798 in Jérémie, Saint-Domingue to a free black woman, Rosalie, and her partner, Michel Vincent, a Frenchman.

Elisabeth's mother was from an area bordered on the east by the Senegal River valley and the Guinea coastline, stretching westward to Mali and encompassing the territory where the Pulaar language is spoken. She arrived in Saint-Domingue just prior to the Haitian Revolution. Slaves from Senegambia were rare in Saint-Domingue and records confirm that the Poulard woman Rosalie was owned in the early 1790s by a freedman, Alexis Couba, who sold her to the merchant Marthe Guillaume. In 1793, Guillaume sold Rosalie to Jean-Baptiste Mongol, the local butcher, but within two years, she had been returned to Guillaume. In December 1795, Guillaume manumitted Rosalie, but British Governor Adam Williamson refused to ratify the official paperwork (this was during the British occupation of Saint-Dominigue during the French Revolutionary Wars).

As Rosalie was technically free, but had no official papers to prove it, her status was ambiguous until the British withdrew in 1798. The following year, she appeared in the Sacramental Record of Elisabeth's baptism as "Marie Françoise, called Rosalie, free black woman" and the father was simply, Michel Vincent. Rosalie was listed by the priest as the mother of a natural child. This designation meant that her parents were not married. Under ancien regime, the father's presence at the baptism was not enough to fully legitimatize his child through marriage. In 1802, the French restored slavery in Martinique and there were rumors that they reassert it in Saint-Domingue. To prevent his family from being forced back into slavery, Michel Vincent drafted a document in 1803 declaring that Rosalie and her children Juste Theodore, Marie Louise (known as Resinette), Etienne Hilaire (called Cadet) and Elisabeth, were all his slaves and manumitted them. Within months, the town of Jérémie was under siege by French troops and Rosalie, Michel and Elisabeth fled to nearby Santiago de Cuba. The other three children (Note: Scott and Hébrard's accounts vary. In some cases, the fate of Marie Louise is unknown and in others, she arrived with the family in Cuba.) disappear from the records and it is unknown whether they were captured, went into hiding in Saint-Domingue, or managed to slip into Cuba, avoiding the record keepers.

Arriving in Santiago de Cuba with some 18,000 other refugees, Michel began working as a farrier and Rosalie raised livestock. As there were no French officials on the island, the Agence des Prises de la Guadeloupe (Guadeloupean Prize Agency), charged with selling plundered ship property and funneling the proceeds from the sales to French troops, acted as an unofficial court of equity for French refugees. On 14 March 1804, an ailing Michel Vincent filed his last will and testament with the agency for validation. Three days later, Rosalie paid the officials of the agency to register the manumission document for the entire family that Vincent had prepared before they fled Saint-Domingue. Within days Vincent died, but as his estate was insolvent, his property was sold to cover his obligations.

== In New Orleans, Louisiana ==
In 1809, during the Peninsular War in Europe, the governor of Cuba ordered all French refugees to leave. As neither was sure of their status, mother and daughter split up, with Rosalie returning to a now independent Haiti and Elisabeth traveling with her godmother, Marie Blanche Peillon (the widow Aubert) and her consort Jean Lambert Détry, a Belgian carpenter, to New Orleans. Buying land in Faubourg Marigny, the couple each developed businesses. Détry worked as a contractor, hiring out sawyers, and Peillon traded in land and slaves. When Détry died in 1821, he left an inheritance of $500 (~$12,094 in 2025) to Elisabeth, and she decided to marry. A marriage contract was prepared for her to wed Jacques Tinchant, son of a free woman of color called Suzette Bayot, another refugee from Saint-Domingue, and her former partner Joseph Tinchant. The contract was prepared without a surname and listed Elisabeth's name as Marie Dieudonné, her mother's first name and her own middle name.

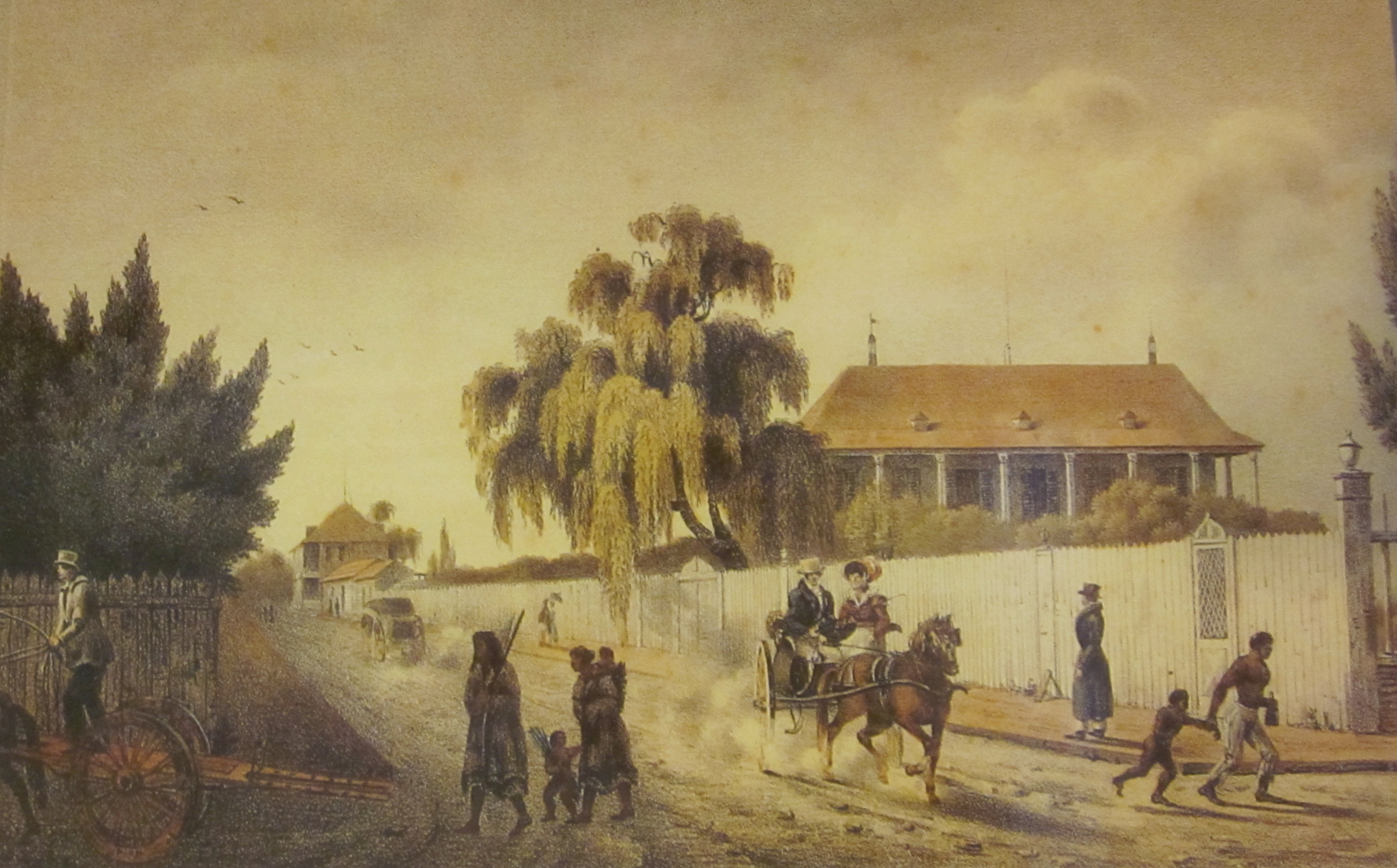
Faubourg Marigny neighborhood of New Orleans c. 1821

The couple married in 1822 and quickly established a business in which Tinchant worked as a builder and carpenter. To provide monthly income, they also hired out their slaves, Gertrude and her daughter Marie Louise, who had been given to them as a wedding present from Peillon. They lived with Peillon, but the relationship was difficult because of her controlling and litigious nature. She refused to give Elisabeth her inheritance from Détry, claiming to have settled their room and board costs with it. After a year, the couple moved out, and on 1 January 1825 they baptized their first child, François Louis Tinchant at the St. Louis Cathedral, in New Orleans. He was shown as a legitimate, free quadroon. That year, statutes were passed which forbade interracial marriage and laws were increasingly passed in Louisiana to restrict the freedom of people of color. Other children followed, including Joseph (born 1827), Pierre (born 1833), Jules (born 1836), and Ernest (born 1839). In 1833, they manumitted Gertrude and acquired another slave in her stead, a black man named Giles (also known as Clark).

By 1835, Tinchant and his half-brother, Pierre Duhart, formed a company in which they developed land and built houses for resale. In November, hoping to erase the stigma of illegitimacy and slave ancestry enshrined in her marriage record, she asked a notary to correct her given name in the marriage record to Elisabeth and to show her surname as Vincent. As documentation, they provided a copy of Elisabeth's baptismal certificate, which was most likely brought by her mother on a visit she had made in April. Though the acknowledgement by her father that Elisabeth was his daughter did not technically confer the right for her to use his surname, the notary, who had a long business relationship with Tinchant, agreed to accept the document and correct the marriage record. Over the next few years, legislation in Louisiana imposed ever harsher restrictions on free people of color, including limits on schooling and requirements for annual registrations to prove their free status. Many of Tinchant's family members left Louisiana for France, and the couple followed them in 1840 after arranging to sell Marie Louise to Gertrude for $800 (around $25,800 in 2025).

== In France ==
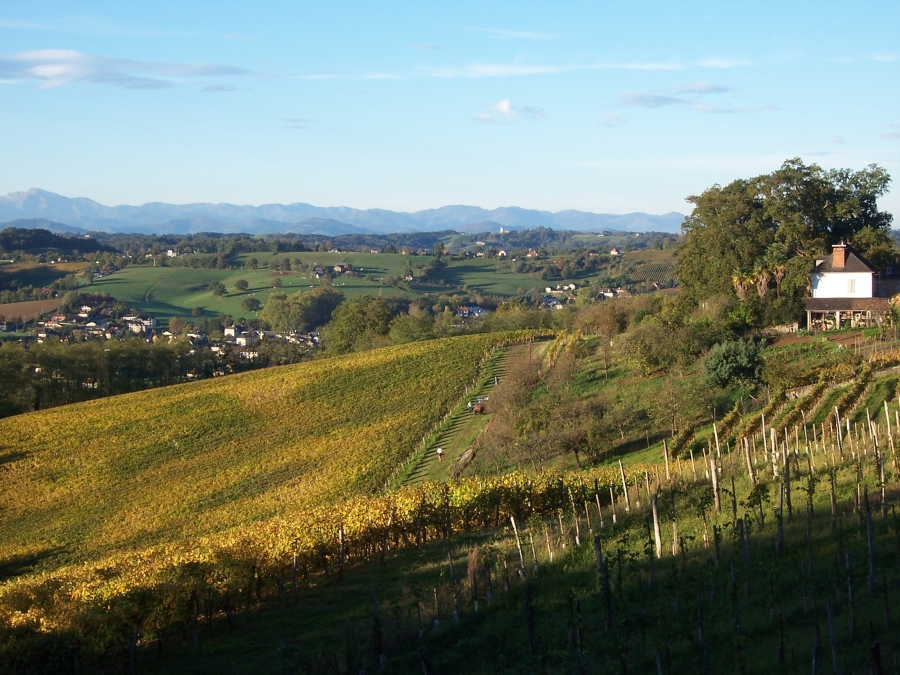
Vineyards in the Pyrénées-Atlantiques region of southern France

In 1840, leaving their oldest son Louis in New Orleans, the couple settled in the Basses Pyrenees region, where Tinchant's brother, Pierre Duhart, and parents had already established themselves. They bought a farmhouse with furnishings, 21 hectares (52 acres) of land, two barns, and livestock in Gan for F27,000 (around $173,860 in 2025). In the village was an elementary school, but Tinchant and Vincent chose to send their children to the nearby collège royal in Pau as it offered a better curriculum. Shortly after they arrived, Tinchant's mother died. The following year, the couple had their last child, Edouard (born 1841). Though he was born in France, because his father was American-born and his mother lost her nationality upon her marriage, Edouard was not entitled to French citizenship, though the couple registered his birth.

With no prior experience in farming, the couple employed sharecroppers to tend their dairy, grain fields, and vineyards. Failed harvests, government rigidity, and poor economic conditions led to the spread of republican ideals in schools from Paris to more rural locations. In 1848, growing opposition to France's constitutional monarchy led to upheaval in nearby Pau, where all of the couple's sons were in school. In 1851 the coup d'état of Louis-Napoleon turned the country away from republicanism. Although the children remained in school through 1854, the family began making plans to leave. They sold their farm for less than they had paid for it and temporarily moved to Jurançon. The proceeds from the farm were loaned to the couple's eldest two sons, Louis and Joseph, who set themselves up as cigar makers in New Orleans. Searching for a European trading partner, the brothers chose to settle in Belgium, which had no state monopoly on tobacco production.

== In Belgium ==
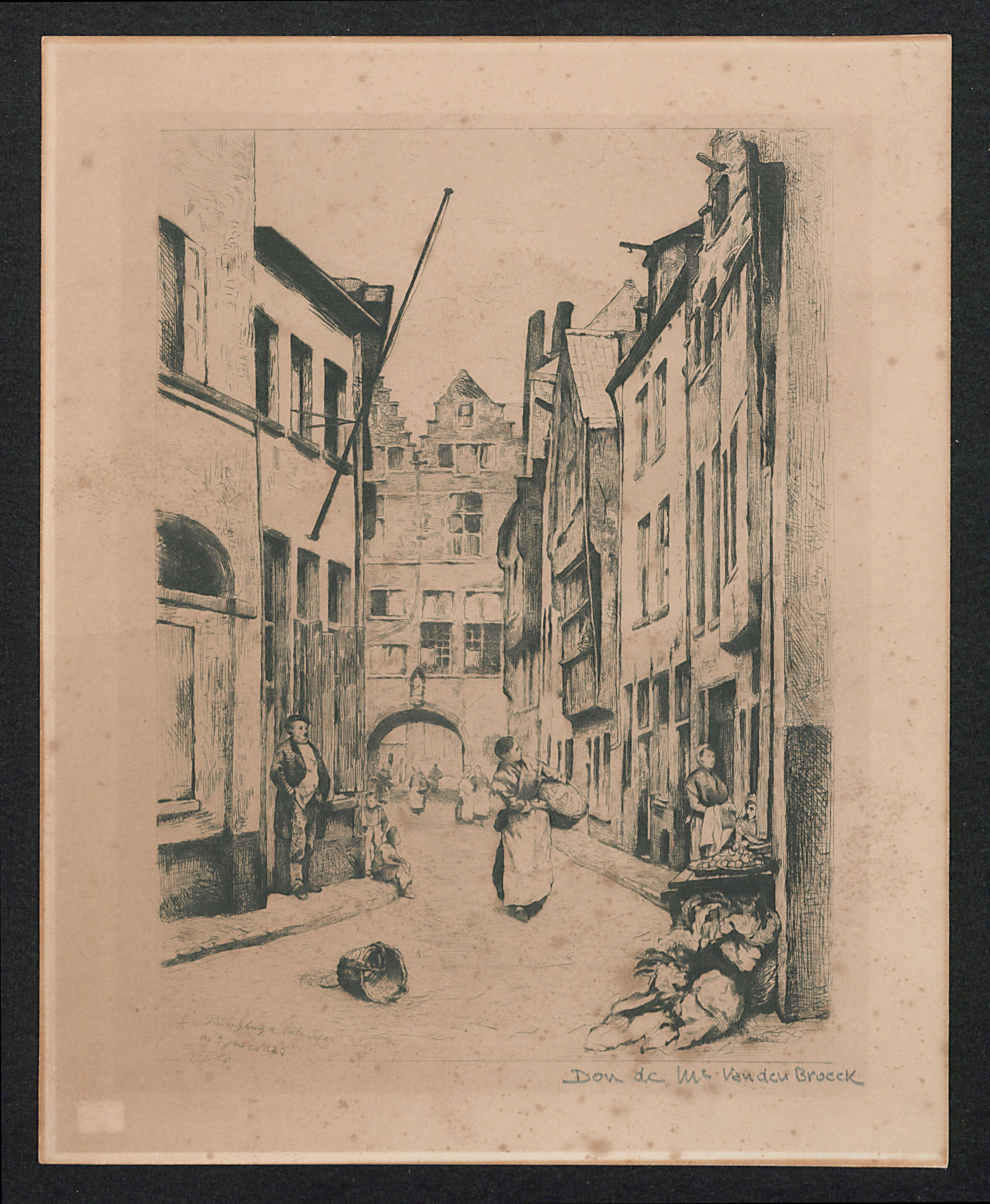
Street scene in Antwerp, 1880, by Piet Verhaert

In 1857, the family relocated to Antwerp, where Tinchant and Louis worked to establish a cigar store and manufacturing firm, which they called Maison Américaine. One by one, the brothers went to the United States, where they created a successful international tobacco business, with Joseph in New Orleans; Pierre working along the Gulf Coast; and eventually Edouard settling into the business in Mobile, Alabama. Jules operated from Veracruz, Mexico and Ernest was located in Antwerp. Tinchant died in 1871 and Vincent survived him by over a decade. Elisabeth Vincent died in Antwerp on 29 November 1883. She and Tinchant were buried in the Schoonselhof cemetery along with three generations of their family.

== Legacy ==
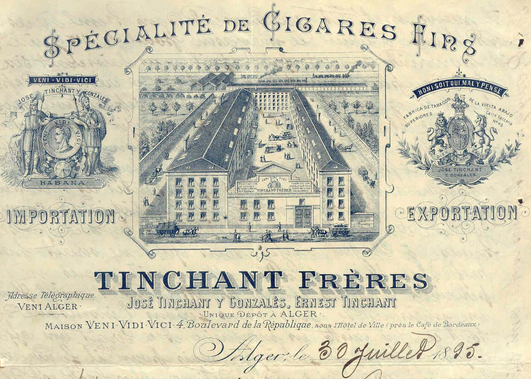
Letterhead for Tinchant Fréres, cigar manufacturors, c. 1895

Vincent's sons Joseph and Edouard both served in the 6th Louisiana Regiment of the Union Army during the American Civil War. At the end of the conflict, Edouard was a delegate to the Louisiana Constitutional Convention of 1867, where he proposed equal civil rights for women and without regard for race. Three generations of the family worked in the tobacco trade, but the business finally collapsed as a result of disruptions caused by World War II. Several family members fought in the resistance and Joseph's granddaughter died at Ravensbrück concentration camp, where she had been sent for her political activities.

The story of Vincent and her family add to the history of statelessness and citizenship, as well as the impact of legal status and paperwork on people of color. Literacy and an understanding of the importance of documentation were crucial to maintaining the status of her family and ensuring their freedom. Despite the political unrest of her lifespan, the family was able to successfully negotiate differing racial divides and varied legal systems, which challenged their ability to attain equal civil status. According to historian Afua Cooper, Vincent's history confirms that through shifting ethnic and national identities in the 19th century, black and free colored people were able to pursue economic success, freedom, respectability, and security across numerous international boundaries. Historian James Sidbury notes that the "micro-history" of Vincent's family confirms that previous historical narratives have distorted understandings of the complex experiences of the African diaspora. The many documents relating to Vincent dispel the notion that their stories lie only in oral histories.
