= Reboot conference =

Right-leaning conference sponsored by the Heritage Foundation

The Reboot Conference, or Reboot: The New Reality, was an annual conference held by the Foundation for American Innovation (FAI) in San Francisco, California, from September 3 to September 5, 2024. The conference was held at Fort Mason Center for The Arts.

== Speakers ==
=== Keynotes ===
On Thursday September 3, venture capitalist Garry Tan gave a keynote address.

On Friday, September 4, Alexandr Wang, the CEO of Scale AI spoke.

=== Additional speakers ===
Kevin Roberts, president of the Heritage Foundation, spoke on Thursday, September 3. He was a surprise speaker, and his appearance had not previously been disclosed. During his talk, he announced that if Kamala Harris were to win the 2024 election, he would focus his efforts on Project 2028, a theoretical follow-up to Project 2025.

Jessica Anderson, the president of the Sentinel Action Fund -- a political fund associated with Heritage Action, a sister organization of the Heritage Foundation that is focused on advocacy -- described Kamala Harris as worse for the cryptocurrency industry than President Joe Biden. She also made the case for Republican control of the United States Senate so that a Republican could control the Senate Banking Committee, rather than "crypto foe", Senator Sherrod Brown.

== Themes ==
Many of the talks and panels related were centered around Project 2025, and the themes contained within the plan.

== Reactions ==
The Phoenix Project, a nonprofit that "brings to light right wing money in politics," said of the event "look no further than an upcoming conclave" as evidence that "radical right politics has appeal with the city’s monied elite."

A small contingent from the California Pirate Party held a protest outside the venue.

After the conference, Soleil Ho of the San Francisco Chronicle described the audience's lack of interest in, and confusion about, why one talk was a panel on pronatalism. They went on to write about how "pronatalism is based on shaky science", as for example, "the world’s population isn’t in decline." They also quoted historian Emily Merchant, author of the book Building the Population Bomb as highlighting the fact that “There’s no agreement among experts on the optimum number of people."

Politico described the attendees as "right-leaning techno-futurists of the Elon Musk type."
