= Kevin Roberts (political strategist) =

American political strategist (born 1974)

- Roberts in 2025

President of The Heritage Foundation and Heritage Action
- Incumbent
- Assumed office December 1, 2021
- Preceded by: Kay Coles James

President of the Texas Public Policy Foundation
- In office February 16, 2018 – October 19, 2021
- Preceded by: Brooke Rollins
- Succeeded by: Greg Sindelar

2nd President of Wyoming Catholic College
- In office August 25, 2013 – August 28, 2016
- Preceded by: Robert Cook
- Succeeded by: Glenn Arbery

Personal details
- Born: Kevin David Roberts; June 24, 1974 (age 52) Lafayette, Louisiana, U.S.
- Party: Republican
- Education: University of Louisiana at Lafayette (BA); Virginia Tech (MA); University of Texas at Austin (PhD)

Academic background
- Thesis: African-Virginian Extended Kin: The Prevalence of West African Family Forms Among Slaves in Virginia, 1740–1870 (1999)
- Doctoral advisor: Crandall Shifflett
- Other advisor: James Sidbury
- Influences: Bernardin • Falola • Moynihan • Sidbury •

Academic work
- Discipline: History
- Institutions: New Mexico State University (2003–2005); Randolph School (2005–2006); University of Louisiana at Lafayette (2006–2013); John Paul the Great Academy (2006–2013)
- Main interests: African-American history

Kevin David Roberts (born June 24, 1974) is an American political strategist and former historian who is the president of the Heritage Foundation, a conservative political think tank, and its lobbying arm, Heritage Action. Roberts was previously the CEO of another conservative think tank, the Texas Public Policy Foundation. He served as the president of Wyoming Catholic College from 2013 to 2016.

Soon after Roberts joined Heritage in December 2021, the organization established the highly controversial Project 2025, an expansive plan to overhaul the government under a new Republican administration and implement conservative policies. Roberts has been called the "mastermind of Project 2025".

== Early life and education ==
Roberts was born on June 24, 1974, in Lafayette, Louisiana, to James A. Roberts Sr. and Susan P. Rabalais (née Pitre). He has a sister, Lori Roberts Romero. Roberts's parents divorced in 1979. His father struggled with alcoholism, and his brother died by suicide at 15. In high school, Roberts was an Eagle Scout, captain of the Lafayette High Quiz bowl team, and president of the National Forensic League. He won over 50 awards in speech and debate competitions. Roberts graduated from Lafayette High School in 1992 and earned a bachelor's degree in history with high honors from the University of Louisiana at Lafayette in 1996, a Master of Arts in history from Virginia Tech in 1999, and a Ph.D. in American history from the University of Texas at Austin in 2003.

Roberts's dissertation examined the cultural construction of the Louisiana slave community from the 1790s to the 1830s, including the influence of the transatlantic, trans-Caribbean, and interstate slave trades, the role of the Catholic Church as an agent of colonial Spain, and the contrasting demographic structures of New Orleans, the coastal sugar parishes, and the Mississippi River-adjacent cotton lands. In 2024, Samuel G. Freedman wrote in the Los Angeles Review of Books that Roberts's dissertation had "all the markings of conventional historiography" and that his later views on the history of racism in the U.S. starkly contrasted with "the intricate, nuanced work on enslaved Black people that he had done as a graduate student".

== Career ==
=== Academia ===
Roberts worked as an assistant professor of history at New Mexico State University from 2003 to 2005. In 2006, he founded John Paul the Great Academy, a private, independent Catholic K-12 school in his hometown of Lafayette, where he serves as chair emeritus on the board of trustees. The school's patron is Josemaría Escrivá, a Catholic saint and the founder of Opus Dei.

Roberts served as president of Wyoming Catholic College from 2013 to 2016, when he accepted a position as executive vice president of the Texas Public Policy Foundation. As president of Wyoming Catholic College, Roberts led the institution to reject Title IV federal student loans and grants, citing religious liberty concerns. The decision made the college one of just a few in the nation to reject such funding. In an article on the decision, The New York Times called Roberts and his students "cowboy Catholics" for their independence.

=== Heritage Foundation ===
In October 2021, it was announced that Roberts had been selected to replace Kay Coles James as president of the Heritage Foundation.

In September 2023, Roberts was selected as president of Heritage Action, the Heritage Foundation's lobbying arm, after executive director Jessica Anderson took a leave of absence in July 2023. Roberts "serves both organizations in a joint role". In 2023, according to the foundation's filing with the Internal Revenue Service, Roberts was compensated $953,920 annually.

In January 2024, Roberts said that he did not believe that Joe Biden won the 2020 presidential election. He also said that he saw Heritage's role as "institutionalizing Trumpism", adding, "the Trump administration, with the best of intentions, simply got a slow start. And Heritage and our allies in Project 2025 believe that must never be repeated."

When asked during a June 2024 interview whether Heritage would accept the results of the 2024 presidential election regardless of its outcome, Roberts replied, "Yes, if there isn't massive fraud like there was in 2020." Despite the persistence of an election denial movement, no evidence of material election fraud in 2020 was found. When presented with data from the Heritage election fraud database indicating there were just 1,513 proven instances of voter fraud in the United States since 1982, Roberts responded that fraud is "very hard to document, and the Democrat party is very good at fraud." He also claimed without evidence that liberals "are supporting legislation that abortion can happen until three days after the person's born".

Appearing on Steve Bannon's War Room podcast in July 2024 to be interviewed by former Congressman Dave Brat, Roberts said: "Let me speak about the radical left. You and I have both been parts of faculties and faculty senates, and understand that the left has taken over our institutions [...] In spite of all this nonsense from the left, we are going to win. We're in the process of taking this country back [...] our side is winning." He added, "We ought to be really encouraged by what happened yesterday", in reference to the Supreme Court decision Trump v. United States, which held that presidents have significant immunity against being prosecuted for actions in office. Roberts continued: "We are in the process of the second American Revolution, which will remain bloodless if the left allows it to be". Shortly afterward, the foundation released a statement that added, "Unfortunately, they have a well established record of instigating the opposite".

Roberts wrote a book originally scheduled for release on September 24, 2024. It was originally titled Dawn's Early Light: Burning Down Washington to Save America and then retitled Dawn's Early Light: Taking Back Washington to Save America. In the book, Roberts writes that "'many of America's institutions...need to be burned'...Included among those to be incinerated...are the FBI and the New York Times, along with 'every Ivy League college', '80% of "Catholic" higher education', and the Boy Scouts of America." The volume has a foreword by Vice President JD Vance. In August 2024, amid the controversy surrounding Project 2025, Roberts postponed the book release until after the November election. He launched book promotion events in Manhattan and Washington, D.C., shortly after the election. On November 13, The Guardian published an account of one of its reporters receiving an invitation to attend the event and being expelled after a brief interview.

Colin Dickey of The New Republic wrote that the book reveals paranoid, Stalinist tactics like using conspiracy theories to violently enforce the right's vision for the world. In the book, Roberts criticizes birth control and law enforcement (preferring a heavily armed frontier-like society), while promoting public prayer as a key tool in the competition with China.

In July 2024, Oklahoma State Superintendent Ryan Walters appointed Roberts and conservative radio talk show host Dennis Prager to a review committee tasked with revising social studies standards for K-12 public school students. The committee's revisions included the incorporation of conspiracy theories related to the 2020 presidential election, as well as references to the Bible and themes of national pride.

In August 2025, David W. Blight, a professor of history at Yale University and author of Frederick Douglass: Prophet of Freedom, challenged Roberts to a series of public debates with a small group of historians.

Roberts serves on the board of the State Leadership Initiative (SLI), a U.S.-based nonprofit organization that builds coalitions in Republican-led states to advance state-level governance reforms focused on economic dynamism and institutional strength. SLI's mission is to organize business and civic leaders to advocate for policy reforms that reduce bureaucratic and regulatory burdens while enhancing state competitiveness and self-governance. SLI was founded by Noah Wall and Nate Fischer, and its chairman is former U.S. Secretary of Labor Alex Acosta. SLI published a study examining the influence of national professional associations and nonpartisan policy groups on state agencies. The study argued that these organizations' influence on state bureaucracies was contributing to the implementation of progressive policies in Republican-led U.S. states.

In February 2026, on the PBD Podcast, hosted by Patrick Bet-David, Roberts said that transgender surgeries are "bad for anybody". He said "evidence" links transgender medical care to acts of violence and noted that Heritage is actively gathering statistics to support this assertion. Roberts also said that Heritage supports banning transition-related care for people of all ages and is willing to pursue an incremental approach, describing it as "willing to take a quarter of the enchilada" as long as progress is made toward a full ban.

Roberts has praised Hungarian prime minister Viktor Orbán's government, calling Hungary "the model for modern statecraft" and saying Western countries should learn from its political system, which political scientists have called an "electoral autocracy".

==== Project 2025 ====
Roberts has been called the "Project 2025 chief", an "architect of Project 2025", the Project 2025 "mastermind", and "the force behind Project 2025". The project focuses on restructuring the federal government, advancing conservative priorities, and ensuring swift implementation of policy changes through personnel and administrative reforms.

The American Civil Liberties Union warned that Project 2025 threatens to erode democracy and civil liberties, proposing radical restructuring of the executive branch to serve a conservative agenda. The liberal Center for American Progress argues that Project 2025 would destroy the U.S. system of checks and balances, creating an imperial presidency with almost unlimited power to implement far-right policies.

During his 2024 presidential campaign, Trump released a statement distancing himself from Project 2025. Media Matters for America reported that Roberts later said, "No hard feelings from any of us at Project 2025 about the statement because we understand Trump is the standard bearer and he's making a political tactical decision there."

While speaking at the Reboot Conference in September 2024, Roberts said that if Kamala Harris won the 2024 election, he would start working on a theoretical second attempt at the Project 2025 agenda, dubbing it Project 2028.

Roberts was invited to speak at a meeting of the Canadian Prime Minister Mark Carney's cabinet ministers in September 2025, but abruptly declined.

== Personal life ==
Roberts and his wife, Michelle LaFleur Roberts, are both Catholic and are members of a parish in Springfield, Virginia. Roberts has close ties to and receives regular spiritual guidance from the Catholic Information Center, led by an Opus Dei priest and incorporated by the Archdiocese of Washington.

Roberts and his wife have four children. His eldest child was born while he was writing his doctoral dissertation.

== Controversies ==
In 2024, several of Roberts's former colleagues from New Mexico State University alleged that Roberts told them he had killed his neighbor's pit bull with a shovel because the dog's barking disturbed his family. Roberts has denied this, saying, "This is a patently untrue and baseless story backed by zero evidence."

In October 2025, Roberts released a video statement defending Tucker Carlson after Carlson interviewed far-right political commentator Nick Fuentes on The Tucker Carlson Show. Roberts said that "Christians can critique the state of Israel without being antisemitic" and that Carlson's detractors were a "venomous coalition", which many Jews and Republicans, including U.S. Senator Ted Cruz, saw as an antisemitic trope. After immense pressure, including a series of resignations from the Heritage Foundation, condemnations mainly from Jewish Republican figures, and a letter of demands from the National Task Force to Combat Antisemitism, Roberts apologized, later clarifying that the script he read in the video was written by an aide who had resigned. After the controversy, The Washington Free Beacon released a video of a staff meeting in which Roberts said he was not very familiar with Fuentes and which a Heritage senior legal fellow called a "master class in cowardice".

In November 2025, American legal scholar and longtime Heritage Foundation board member Robert P. George resigned from the organization, citing Roberts's refusal to fully recant remarks he had made in his response to Carlson. Two more board members, Shane McCullar and Abby Spencer Moffat, resigned in December 2025 amid the fallout from Roberts's defense of Carlson.

More than a dozen Heritage staff members also resigned in December 2025, citing concerns about Roberts's leadership. The staff members joined former Vice President Mike Pence's think tank Advancing American Freedom, which drew mixed reactions from conservative figures.

In April 2026, The Washington Post reported that Roberts had spoken at a dinner hosted by Chronicles, a magazine the Southern Poverty Law Center has said has "strong neo-Confederate ties". The Post reported that Roberts toasted Chronicles editor-in-chief Paul Gottfried, calling him "one of the sages of our age".

In July 2026, The New York Times reported that 293 people had left Heritage since Roberts became president in 2021, and that departures accelerated after his October 2025 video defending Tucker Carlson. Employees were dismissed or resigned with little explanation, and some former colleagues said that they had begun communicating over Signal and burner phones out of concern that work computers were being monitored. A 2025 letter from an employee to Heritage's board of trustees alleged a pattern of religiously and ideologically motivated hiring and dismissals under Roberts. Roberts also reportedly said Heritage's task was to define the conservative movement's direction after Trump leaves office in 2029 and build a coalition capable of winning elections, including engagement with figures on the party's fringes, while saying that doing so did not amount to endorsing their views.

== Publications ==
- Roberts, Kevin. (1999). African-Virginian Extended Kin: The Prevalence of West African Family Forms among Slaves in Virginia, 1740–1870 (M.A. thesis). Virginia Polytechnic Institute and State University. OCLC 41664676.
- Roberts, Kevin D. (2003). Slaves and slavery in Louisiana: the evolution of Atlantic world identities, 1791–1831 (PhD thesis). University of Texas at Austin. hdl:2152/885. OCLC 847273464.
- Roberts, Kevin D. (July 2005). "The Claims of Kinfolk: African American Property and Community in the Nineteenth-Century South (review)". Journal of Social History. 38 (4): 1116–1118. doi:10.1353/jsh.2005.0074.
- Roberts, Kevin D. (2006). African American Issues. Contemporary American Ethnic Issues. Westport, CT: Greenwood Press. ISBN 9780313332401. OCLC 61520286.
- Roberts, Kevin D. (2006). "Demographics". In Finkelman, Paul (ed.). Encyclopedia of African American History, 1619–1895: From the Colonial Period to the Age of Frederick Douglass. Oxford University Press. ISBN 9780195167771. OCLC 62430770.
- Roberts, Kevin D. (2007). "Race and Colonialism in the Americas". In Benjamin, Thomas (ed.). Encyclopedia of Western Colonialism since 1450. Detroit: Macmillan Reference USA. ISBN 9780028658438. OCLC 67239488.
- Roberts, Kevin D.; Falola, Toyin (2008). The Atlantic world, 1450–2000. Bloomington: Indiana University Press. ISBN 9780253349705. OCLC 177068609.
- Roberts, Kevin D. (October 2015). "Mother church or Uncle Sam". First Things: A Monthly Journal of Religion and Public Life (256): 19–218.
- Roberts, Kevin (2024). Dawn's Early Light: Taking Back Washington to Save America. Foreword by JD Vance. Broadside Books. ISBN 978-0063353503.
