= Zoë Winters =

American actress (born 1985)

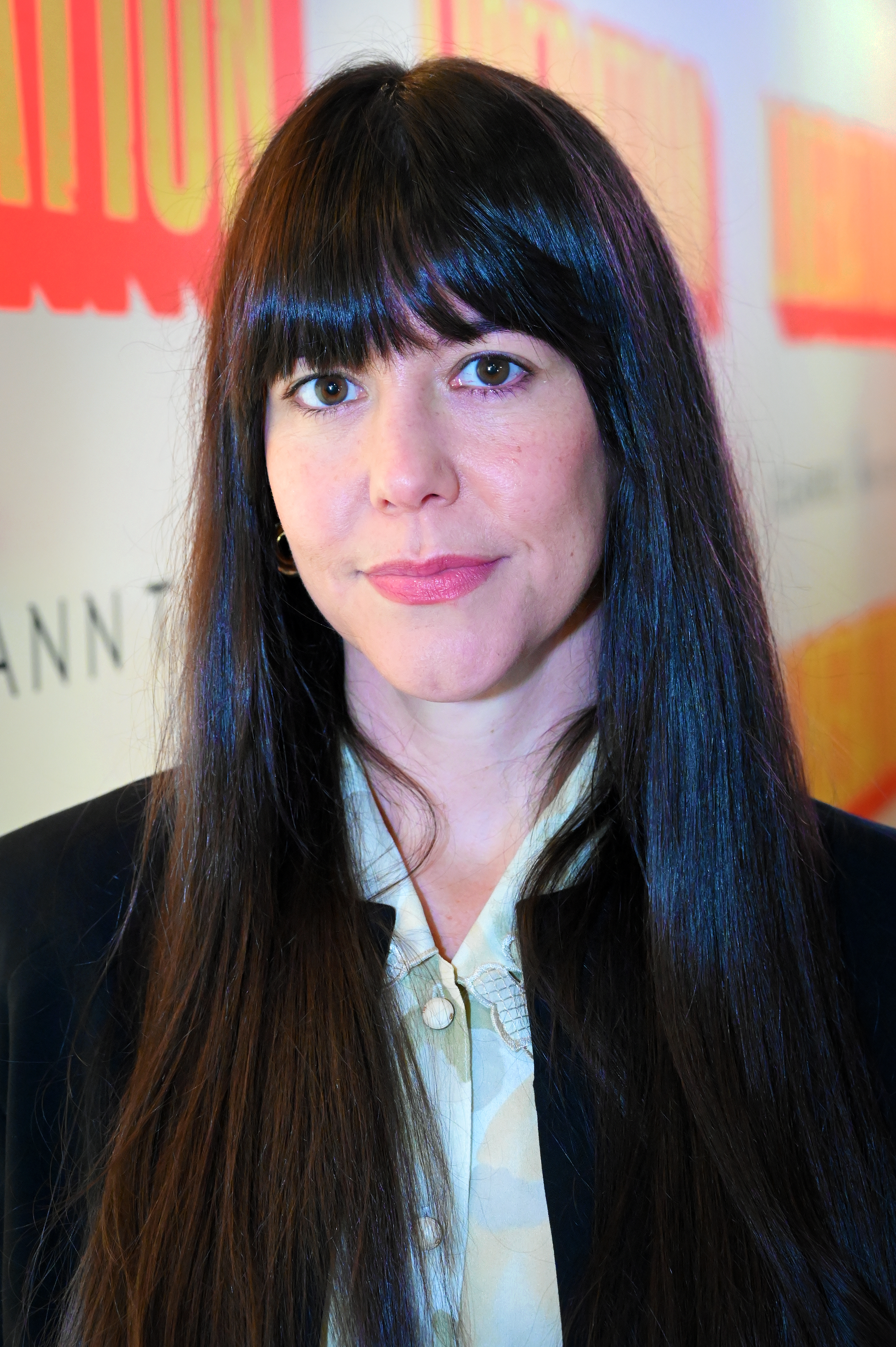
- Winters in 2025
- Born: February 20, 1985 (age 41); Santa Cruz, California
- Occupation: Actress
- Years active: 2007–present

Zoë Winters (born February 20, 1985) is an American actress. She is most known for her recurring role on Succession (2018–2023), for which she won a Screen Actors Guild Award for Outstanding Performance by an Ensemble in a Drama Series. She has also taken supporting roles in the independent films In the Family (2011), Jules (2023), Materialists (2025), and The Drama (2026).

She has also appeared in multiple Off-Broadway plays, including Heroes of the Fourth Turning for which she received a Lucille Lortel Award nomination and an Obie Award. She also starred in other plays including Walden and Small Mouth Sounds.

== Early life and education ==
Winters was born on February 20, 1985, in Santa Cruz, California. She attended the State University of New York at Purchase, graduating in 2007.

== Career ==
Winters is best known for her role as Kerry Castellabate on Succession, for which she won a Screen Actors Guild Award for Outstanding Performance by an Ensemble in a Drama Series.

On television, Winters played a prominent role in the second season of Showtime's Flatbush Misdemeanors. In films, she has appeared in In the Family by Patrick Wang, Jules by Marc Turtletaub, and Materialists by Celine Song.

She has been in multiple Off-Broadway plays including Heroes of the Fourth Turning for which she received a Lucille Lortel Award nomination, and an Obie Award. She also starred in other plays including An Octoroon, Walden and Small Mouth Sounds.

== Acting credits ==
=== Film ===
Year	Title	Role	Notes
2011	Under	Sydney	Short film
2011	In the Family	Helen	Feature film debut
2013	Gray Dog	Bee	Short film
2016	Giant	Clara	Short film
2023	Jules	Denise	
2024	Cold Wallet	Eileen	
2024	Egg Timer	Daphne	Short film
2025	Materialists	Sophie	
2026	The Drama	Frances	
2026	Via Negativa	Beth	

=== Television ===
Key
†	Denotes television productions that have not yet been released

Year	Title	Role	Notes
2007	Gossip Girl	Waitress	Episode: "Seventeen Candles"
2008	Army Wives	Jan	Episode: "Casting Out the Net"
2009	Ugly Betty	Applicant #3	Episode: "Kissed Off"
2009	Law & Order	Suzanne	Episode: "Reality Bites"
2015	Elementary	Mahra Kemp	Episode: "The View from Olympus"
2017	Madam Secretary	Claire Mitchell	Episode: "The Seventh Floor"
2018	The Good Fight	Gretchen Mackie	Episode: "Day 478"
2019–2023	Succession	Kerry Castellabate	Recurring role (seasons 2–4)
2020	Hunters	Congresswoman Elizabeth Handelman	Episode: "Eliu v'Eliu"
2020	Helpsters	Teresa Tutu (voice)	Episode: "Ballerina Betsy/Pizza Pasquale"
2022	Flatbush Misdemeanors	Nancy	6 episodes
2023	Command Z	Christina Martin	Episode: "The Climate II"
TBA	Seven Sisters †	TBA	Upcoming series
TBA	The Off Weeks †	Jenny Adler	Upcoming miniseries

=== Theater ===
Year	Title	Role	Playwright	Venue	Ref.
2012	4000 Miles	Bec	Amy Herzog	Lincoln Center Theatre, Off-Broadway	
2014	Much Ado About Nothing	Margaret	William Shakespeare	The Public Theater, Off-Broadway	
2015	Shows for Days	Maria	Douglas Carter Beane	Lincoln Center Theatre, Off-Broadway	
2016	Red Speedo	Lydia	Lucas Hnath	New York Theatre Workshop, Off-Broadway	
2016	Small Mouth Sounds	Alicia	Bess Wohl	Signature Theatre Company, Off-Broadway	
2016	The Harvest	Ada	Samuel D. Hunter	Lincoln Center Theater, Off-Broadway	
2019	White Noise	Dawn	Suzan-Lori Parks	The Public Theater, Off-Broadway	
2020	Heroes of the Fourth Turning	Teresa	Will Arbery	Playwrights Horizons, Off-Broadway	
2024	Walden	Cassie	Amy Berryman	Second Stage Theater, Off-Broadway	
2026	Birthright	Chaya	Jonathan Spector	MCC Theater, Off-Broadway	

== Awards and nominations ==
Organizations	Year	Category	Work	Result	Ref.
Lucille Lortel Awards	2020	Outstanding Lead Actress in a Play	Heroes of the Fourth Turning	Nominated	
Obie Awards	2020	Special Citation	Heroes of the Fourth Turning	Honored	
Actor Awards	2021	Outstanding Ensemble in a Drama Series	Succession (season three)	Won	
Actor Awards	2023	Outstanding Ensemble in a Drama Series	Succession (season four)	Won	
