= John Paul The Great Academy =

John Paul the Great Academy

Location
- 1522 Carmel Drive; Lafayette, (Lafayette Parish), Louisiana 70501; United States
- 30°13′46″N 91°59′02″W

Information
- Type: Private, Coeducational
- Motto: Truth ∙ Faith ∙ Virtue
- Religious affiliation: independent Roman Catholic
- Patron saint: Josemaría Escrivá
- Established: 2007
- Founder: Kevin Roberts and Father Bryce Sibley
- Dean: Cory Hayes
- Head of school: Angela Odinet
- Grades: PK3–12
- Student to teacher ratio: 13:1
- Colors: Navy blue and burgundy
- Mascot: Guardian
- Accreditation: National Association of Private Catholic Independent Schools Louisiana Board of Elementary and Secondary Education
- Website: School Website

John Paul the Great Academy is a private, Roman Catholic high school in Lafayette, Louisiana. It is operated independent of the Roman Catholic Diocese of Lafayette.

== History ==
In 2005, Kevin Roberts conceived the idea for a school that would be approved by the Diocese of Lafayette, yet independent in governance, allowing the school to establish its own curriculum. In 2006, Roberts and Father Bryce Sibley founded John Paul the Great Academy. The school celebrated its first graduating class in 2007. Father Sibley, a priest of the Diocese of Lafayette, served as pastor and chaplain at Our Lady of Wisdom Catholic Student Center on the campus of the University of Louisiana at Lafayette from 2010 to 2021. Father Sibley serves on the faculty of Notre Dame Seminary in New Orleans. Roberts served as the head of the school until 2013, when he moved to Wyoming Catholic College. In 2021, he was appointed president of the Heritage Foundation. He serves as chair emeritus on the school's board of trustees.

The school started in a former restaurant in Carencro. In 2011, it relocated to a 39 acre property with a former school once used by the De La Salle Christian Brothers. In 2012, the school raised over $400,000 in six weeks.

The school's curriculum blends classical literature and contemporary materials, all of which uphold the Catholic stance of supporting life from conception to natural death. The school employs its own textbooks, and its teaching relies heavily on the writings and speeches of Pope John Paul II and Pope Benedict XVI. Opus Dei founder Josemaría Escrivá is considered the school’s patron.

The Senior Capstone Project follows the spirit of the Medieval tradition, with seniors expected to embrace the teachings of St. Josemaría Escrivá by sanctifying ordinary work through diligence and joy. Each year, the school confers the St. Josemaría Escrivá Award to a student who pursues excellence and demonstrates virtue in every area of his or her life. Notably, in the first four years of operation, more than half of all male graduates entered seminary formation for the Diocese of Lafayette.

The campus also houses the Preachers of Christ and Mary, a religious order of nuns founded in Columbia in 1995.

Christian Brother Samuel Martinez, a former resident of the campus, was relocated to a nursing home when the school acquired the property. In 2003, Martinez was accused of sexually molesting boys during the 1970s and 1980s, while he was the principal at Cathedral High School in El Paso, Texas. He was also accused of molesting a boy at a school in New Orleans during the same period. The Diocese of El Paso settled with two victims for $1.6 million dollars.

Martinez regularly traveled from the nursing home to visit John Paul the Great campus on weekends to participate in activities with the Christian Brothers. After this was discovered, school administrators asserted that no students were present, although school calendars indicated otherwise. A spokesperson for the Brothers stated that Martinez would cease visiting the campus due to his deteriorating health, and the Christian Brothers issued a statement declaring that they “decided to permanently exclude him from ever coming on campus again.”

The school participated in the Louisiana K-12 Scholarship Program, which allowed students from underperforming public schools to use vouchers for tuition, and it participates in the LA GATOR Scholarship Program. This program, supported by Governor Jeff Landry, enables parents to use state funds for private school tuition.

From 2012 to the present, the school hosted a series of prominent keynote speakers at its fundraising dinner. In 2012, former Lafayette Bishop Harry Flynn delivered the keynote address. The following year, former U.S. Senator Rick Santorum served as the keynote speaker. In 2014, Alan Keyes, former U.N. Ambassador, delivered the address. In 2017, Ryan T. Anderson, then the William E. Simon Senior Research Fellow at the Heritage Foundation and founder and editor of Public Discourse, the journal of the Witherspoon Institute, was the keynote speaker. Luis Tellez, a former national official of Opus Dei, oversees the Witherspoon Institute's Princeton programs. Additionally, two of the institute's donors are foundations associated with Opus Dei members. In 2022, Archbishop Salvatore Cordileone was the featured speaker. Jim Caviezel delivered the address in 2024, while Jeremy Wayne Tate served as the keynote speaker in 2025. Additional speakers have included Alice von Hildebrand, George Weigel, and Bret Baier.

The school hosts an annual fundraiser called The Collarnary Cook-Off at Vermilionville to support its scholarship program, which assists families in need with tuition and fees. Local Catholic priests participate in a gumbo cook-off.

Some parts of the film A Sort of Homecoming were filmed on the school campus.

As of 2025, the school educates grades PK-12. The 2025-2026 school profile reports an enrollment of 388 students spanning Pre-K-3 to 12th grade, with 110 in the high school division (grades 9-12). The Academy serves 204 families across the Acadiana region. The student population comprises 92% White, 4% African American, 1.92% Hispanic, and 1.4% multiracial students.
