= Isabella Byrd =

21st century lighting designer

Isabella Byrd is an American lighting designer. She has designed plays and musicals, and is known for her close collaborations with major American playwrights.

== Early life and education ==
Isabella Byrd grew up in Houston, Texas. Her interest in the arts was first sparked in childhood, as a student of ballet and modern dance. She attended Houston's High School for the Performing and Visual Arts, where she was introduced to lighting design as an artistic discipline, and went on to earn a BFA in Theatre Design & Technology at the University of Cincinnati – College-Conservatory of Music.

Early in her career, Byrd worked as an assistant to designers Jane Cox, Tyler Micoleau, Matt Frey, and Paul Toben.

== Lighting design ==
Byrd is known for her minimalist style and a preference for subtlety and restraint. She has referred to herself as a "darkness designer" and has received positive critical recognition for the use of unusually low lighting. Reflecting on the development of this style, she told Broadway.com that "darkness was a really exciting palette that I could use instead of fight against.

The core of her design practice is a careful dramaturgical exploration of the performance text coupled with an intensive and wide-ranging research process. Her approach to theatrical design is just as concerned with time and duration as it is with light and darkness. The key themes across her body of work include an interest in how human scale relates to both architecture and the natural landscape, as well as observations and explorations in contrast, visual lyricism, shadow play, and the uncanny.

Byrd describes the combination of artistry and technical knowledge at play in her lighting design work as "trying to teach the robots poetry." She has cited the poetry of Anne Carson and the visual art of James Turrell and Doug Wheeler as inspirations for her work.

=== Off-Broadway ===
Byrd has designed many off-Broadway productions, including Infinite Life by Annie Baker at the Atlantic Theater Company, Eboni Booth's Pulitzer-winning Primary Trust at Roundabout Theater Company, and Caryl Churchill's Light Shining in Buckinghamshire at New York Theater Workshop.

Her work was crucial to creating the distinctive atmosphere of Will Arbery's Pulitzer-finalist play Heroes of the Fourth Turning, which premiered at Playwrights Horizons in 2019. In that piece, the design elements took inspiration from the darkness and isolation of the setting: rural Wyoming, late at night. Byrd and her collaborators tested the boundaries of how low the light levels onstage could get while still allowing the audience to follow the action of the play, creating the visual effect of figures alternately emerging from and swallowed by darkness, as if balanced on the edge of an abyss. Byrd described this design choice as one that required the audience to make "a literal corneal adjustment."

Byrd's 2020 design for Sanctuary City by Martyna Majok at New York Theater Workshop was a notable example of her minimalist style. Byrd described the play as "begin[ning] with a whirlwind series of small scene-lets or beats. Although some of the scenes were only three sentences long, we were able to use simple light to inform the audience to quickly discern a time jump, as well as the new physical and emotional space. We only used warm to cool white light, keeping it inside that narrow color range."

=== Broadway ===
Byrd made her Broadway debut in 2024 with three shows, all performed in the round: Cabaret at the Kit Kat Club, directed by Rebecca Frecknall, and An Enemy of the People, directed by Sam Gold. She received a Tony award nomination for each show. In fall 2024 she designed Romeo + Juliet, directed by Sam Gold.

She has also worked internationally, designing the London productions of Annie Baker's Infinite Life, Jeremy O. Harris's "Daddy," and Rebecca Frecknall's West End production of Cabaret.

She was recognized with a special Drama Desk Award in 2024. The citation listed her contributions to the 2024 theater season both on and off-Broadway, stating that "her spotlight on quiet, small-scale stories both enchanted us...and mesmerized us."

Byrd is an active member of United Scenic Artists, Local USA 829 and an advocate for pay equity in the live-entertainment industry.

=== Critical reception ===
In The New Yorker, Vinson Cunningham called Isabella Byrd "one artist whose lightscapes tend to linger in my mind" and described the way her lighting "exert[s] a strong but delicate harmonic influence" on the plays she designs.

New York magazine's Sara Holdren described her design for Annie Baker's Infinite Life as "crisp, beautiful, and impressively funny."

== Other work ==
Byrd worked as a creative producer for the 13P playwrights' collective archival website. She was a design editor and contributor to Chance Magazine

She designed lighting for Ceilidh in its North American premiere, directed by Sam Pinkleton at the M&T Bank Exchange in Baltimore, Maryland in 2025.

With fellow lighting designer Alejandro Fajardo, Byrd is a co-creator of the Instagram hashtag #thelightin, which collects images of natural lighting effects and phenomena all over the world.

== Awards and nominations ==
Year	Award	Category	Production	Outcome
2026	Tony Award	Best Lighting Design in a Play	Dog Day Afternoon	Nominated
2025	Drama Desk Award	Outstanding Lighting Design	Glass. Kill. What If If Only. Imp.	Nominated
2024	Tony Award	Best Lighting Design in a Musical	Cabaret at the Kit Kat Club	Nominated
2024	Tony Award	Best Lighting Design in a Play	An Enemy of the People	Nominated
2024	Drama Desk Award	Special Award	An Enemy of the People	Won
2023	Lucille Lortel Award	Outstanding Lighting Design	Epiphany	Won
2023	Drama Desk Award	Outstanding Lighting Design of a Play	Epiphany	Nominated
2023	Henry Hewes Design Awards	Lighting Design	Epiphany	Nominated
2023	Henry Hewes Design Awards	Lighting Design	The Good John Proctor	Nominated
2022	Lucille Lortel Award	Outstanding Lighting Design	Sanctuary City	Won
2022	Henry Hewes Design Awards	Lighting Design	Sanctuary City	Nominated
2022	Drama Desk Award	Outstanding Lighting Design of a Play	Sanctuary City	Nominated
2022	Olivier Award	Best Lighting Design	Cabaret	Nominated
2020	Lucille Lortel Award	Outstanding Lighting Design	Heroes of the Fourth Turning	Won
2020	Henry Hewes Design Awards	Lighting Design	Heroes of the Fourth Turning	Won
2020	Drama Desk Award	Outstanding Lighting Design of a Play	Heroes of the Fourth Turning	Nominated
2020	Obie Awards	Special Citation: Creative Team & Ensemble	Heroes of the Fourth Turning	Won
2019	Obie Awards	Lighting Design	Light Shining in Buckinghamshire	Won
2019	Henry Hewes Design Awards	Lighting Design	Plano	Nominated
2019	Henry Hewes Design Awards	Lighting Design	"Daddy"	Nominated
2018	Henry Hewes Design Awards	Lighting Design	Light Shining in Buckinghamshire	Nominated

== Personal life ==
Isabella Byrd lives in Brooklyn, New York. From 2020 to 2021, she served on the board of directors of the Greene Hill Food Co-op.
