= Heroes of the Fourth Turning =

2019 play by Will Arbery

- 2019 Off-Broadway production poster
- Original language: English
- Written by: Will Arbery
- Characters: Justin; Teresa; Kevin; Emily; Gina

Premiere
- Date: September 13, 2019
- Place: Playwrights Horizons

Heroes of the Fourth Turning is a 2019 play by American writer Will Arbery. It focuses on a group of young Catholic intellectuals who reunite at their college in Wyoming. It premiered off-Broadway. It was received positively by both theatrical critics and conservative media and was a finalist for the 2020 Pulitzer Prize in drama.

== Plot ==
The play is set in 2017, shortly after the Unite the Right rally. It opens with Justin shooting a deer. The four friends spend an evening in a backyard after attending a reunion at their college. They debate numerous political and religious topics. Throughout, a loud sound, which Justin says is a generator, intermittently interrupts the characters. Kevin, drunk, seeks a girlfriend. Midway through the play, they are joined by Gina Presson, their former mentor, who chastises Teresa for her new political beliefs. The play ends with an impassioned monologue from Emily about her pain.

== Characters ==
- Emily, an empathetic daughter of professors at the college who lives with chronic pain
- Justin, a stoic outdoorsman who works at the college
- Kevin, an adrift alcoholic fascinated by the outside world
- Teresa, a passionate disciple of Steve Bannon who lives in New York and writes for a right-wing publication
- Gina Presson, a professor at the college and its incoming president, as well as Emily's mother

== Production history ==
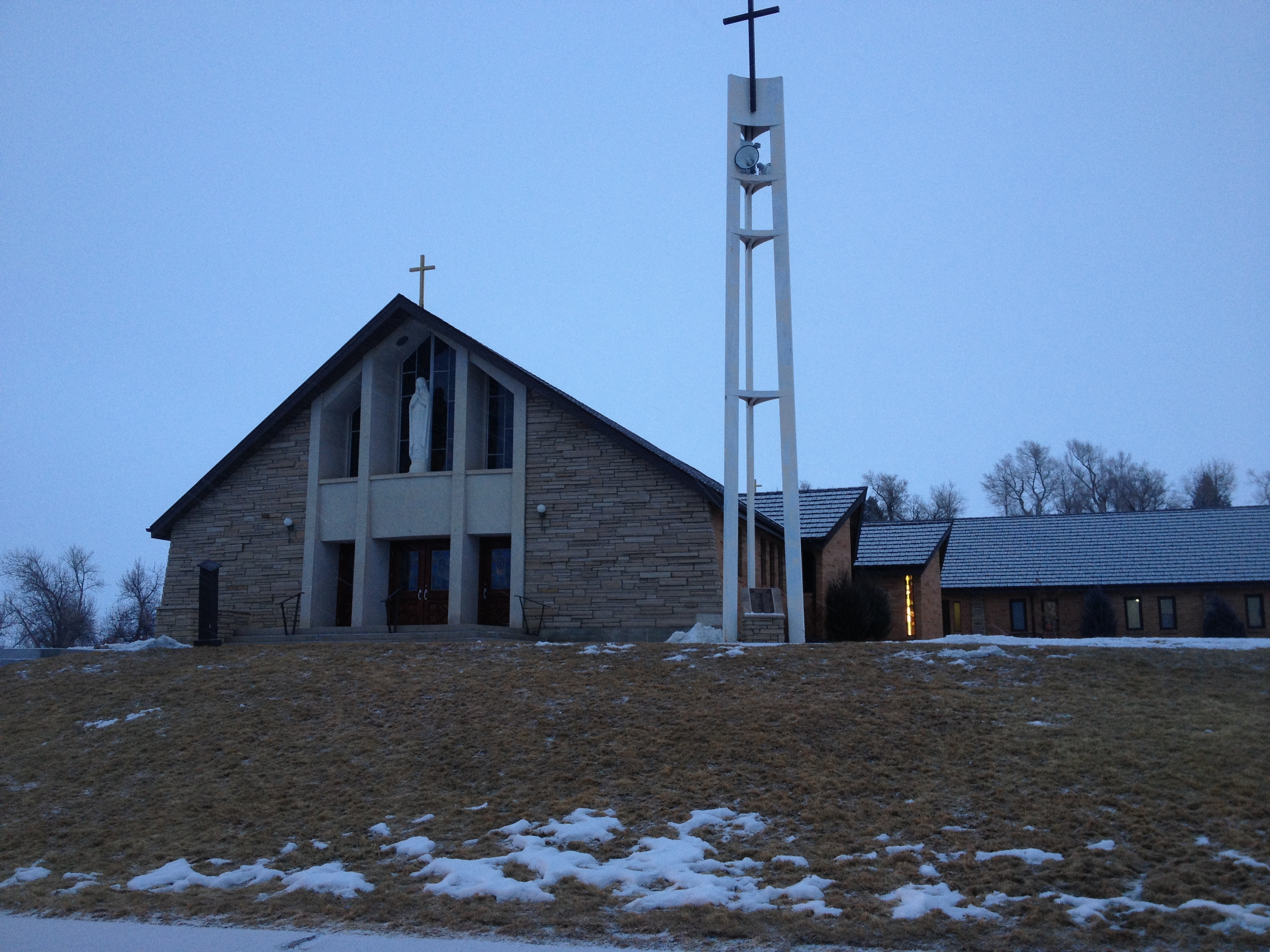
Church of the Holy Rosary, shared between Wyoming Catholic College, the inspiration for Transfiguration College, and a local parish

The playwright, Will Arbery, is the son of Glenn Arbery, the former president of Wyoming Catholic College (WCC), a small liberal arts college in Lander, Wyoming, that combines a great books curriculum with outdoor education. The play's fictional Transfiguration College is based on WCC. The title is a reference to the Fourth Turning, a concept in the Strauss–Howe generational theory. Throughout the writing process, he grappled with how to invite audiences to engage with the characters' ideas without asking them to empathize with them or providing a platform for hateful speech.

The play grew out of a shorter work that Arbery wrote for Ensemble Studio Theater shortly before the 2016 U.S. presidential election, depicting reactions to an anticipated Clinton victory. After Trump won, Arbery rewrote and expanded the work.

The play premiered off-Broadway at Playwrights Horizons in New York City in 2019, directed by Danya Taymor. During the COVID-19 pandemic, Taymor staged a virtual revival of the Playwrights Horizons production for five performances from October 21 to 24, 2020, produced by Jeremy O. Harris and hosted on Zoom featuring the original cast.

== Reception ==
The play was received positively by theatrical critics. Jesse Green, writing for The New York Times, called it "a red-state unicorn" that "explores the lives and ideas of conservatives with affection, understanding and deep knowledge — if not, ultimately, approval." He praised "its eagerness to admit, and to subtly criticize by juxtaposition, all arguments". Vinson Cunningham, in The New Yorker, wrote, "Much of the thrill of the play comes in hearing ultraconservative ideas—scarce on New York stages—discussed in earnest, and carried to their most ominous conclusions." Alissa Wilkinson wrote for Vox, "Arbery is neither blindly accepting nor promoting of his characters; to validate or advance a specific worldview isn't the play's intention. Instead, it gently and sometimes joltingly lets Justin, Emily, Teresa, and Kevin lay out their constellation of individual beliefs on their own terms."

It was also received positively by conservative and Catholic publications, such as the Catholic Herald, whose Chad Pecknold wrote, "Arbery's play is remarkable for never letting progressives rest in their dismissals of conservatives, and also for holding up a critical mirror to the often messy disputes that conservatives have amongst themselves." In a glowing review for The American Conservative, Rod Dreher wrote, "I can't think of a single novel, film, or play that better illustrates the spirits of our culture war."

=== Awards and nominations ===
Year	Award	Category	Work	Result	Ref.
2020	Pulitzer Prize for Drama		Will Arbery	Nominated	
2020	Drama Desk Award	Outstanding Play		Nominated	
2020	Drama Desk Award	Outstanding Lighting Design of a Play	Isabella Byrd	Nominated	
2020	Drama Desk Award	Outstanding Sound Design of a Play	Justin Ellington	Nominated	
2020	Outer Critics Circle Award	John Gassner Award	Will Arbery	Honored	
2020	Outer Critics Circle Award	Outstanding Lighting Design	Isabella Byrd	Honored	
2020	Lucille Lortel Award	Outstanding Play		Won	
2020	Lucille Lortel Award	Outstanding Director	Danya Taymor	Nominated	
2020	Lucille Lortel Award	Outstanding Lead Actress in a Play	Zoë Winters	Nominated	
2020	Lucille Lortel Award	Outstanding Featured Actress in a Play	Michele Pawk	Won	
2020	Lucille Lortel Award	Outstanding Lighting Design	Isabella Byrd	Won	
2020	Lucille Lortel Award	Outstanding Sound Design	Justin Ellington	Nominated	
2020	New York Drama Critics' Circle Award	Best Play		Won	
2020	Obie Award	Distinguished Playwriting	Will Arbery	Won	
2020	Obie Award	Special Citation	Creative Team and Ensemble	Won	
