= Jules (film) =

2023 film by Marc Turtletaub

- Theatrical release poster
- Directed by: Marc Turtletaub
- Written by: Gavin Steckler
- Produced by: Debbie Liebling; Andy Daly; Michael B. Clark; Alex Turtletaub; Marc Turtletaub
- Starring: Ben Kingsley; Harriet Sansom Harris; Zoë Winters; Jade Quon; Jane Curtin
- Cinematography: Christopher Norr
- Edited by: Ayelet Gil-Efrat
- Music by: Volker Bertelman
- Production company: Big Beach
- Distributed by: Bleecker Street
- Release dates: March 22, 2023 (Sonoma); August 11, 2023 (United States)
- Running time: 87 minutes
- Country: United States
- Language: English
- Box office: $2 million

Jules is a 2023 American science fiction film directed by Marc Turtletaub as a comedy-drama. Written by Gavin Steckler, it stars Ben Kingsley, Harriet Sansom Harris, Zoë Winters, Jade Quon, and Jane Curtin.

The film was theatrically released in North America (US, limited release in Canada) in August 2023, in Ireland and the UK on 29 December 2023, and in Germany on 1 February 2024.

== Plot ==
Milton Robinson is a 78-year-old widower living on his own. He frequently attends city council meetings and receives help from his daughter. One day, a spaceship crash lands in his backyard flower garden and a blue humanoid alien crawls out of it. Milton attempts to get help by calling the police and his daughter, and informing the city council. However, all of those people believe Milton's claim is further proof of his senility.

Milton treats the alien as a house guest and discovers the alien will only eat apples. Milton's acquaintance, Sandy, visits Milton and discovers the alien. Sandy tells Milton to not tell anyone about the alien. Joyce, another elderly woman, also discovers the alien. Sandy names the alien "Jules", but Joyce wants to call the alien "Gary". Jules begins repairing the spaceship but does not appear to be making quick progress. Milton's daughter, Denise, hears about her father's antics and schedules him for a mental evaluation, where Milton and Denise are told that Milton's faculties are quickly diminishing and that he should consider assisted living. This upsets Milton, and he angrily leaves.

Sandy tries to launch a community outreach programme aimed at connecting with the town’s younger residents. However, things take a dark turn when a young man she invites into her home attempts to rob her. After Sandy catches him stealing her jewellery and threatens to call the police, he attacks her and tries to strangle her. At that moment, Jules experiences a vision of the assault and uses his telepathic powers to make the attacker’s head explode, drawing the attention of local police.

Meanwhile, Milton, Sandy, and Joyce discover that Jules needs the bodies of seven dead cats to generate enough power to repair the spaceship. Milton and Sandy set out to collect them, all while Milton struggles with anxiety over his worsening mental decline. Unbeknownst to them, the police are secretly following and observing their increasingly suspicious behaviour.

To complete the repairs, Joyce ultimately sacrifices her own deaf and blind cat. Once the spaceship is functional again, Jules invites the group to leave Earth with him. Milton seriously considers going, but hesitates after speaking with his daughter on the phone.

Before he can decide, NSA agents storm Milton’s house. Forced to flee, Milton, Sandy, and Joyce escape aboard the UFO with Jules. He eventually drops them off at another location on Earth, and the group goes their separate ways.

== Cast ==
- Ben Kingsley as Milton Robinson
- Jane Curtin as Joyce
- Harriet Sansom Harris as Sandy
- Zoë Winters as Denise Robinson, Milton's daughter
- Jade Quon as Jules, the alien
- Andy Daly as Aaron Campbell

== Production ==
Principal photography began in New Jersey on September 10, 2021. Filming was done in Boonton, Chatham and Pompton Plains. The film entered post-production in February 2022.

== Release ==
The film premiered at the Sonoma International Film Festival on March 22, 2023. In April 2023, Bleecker Street acquired North American distribution rights to the film, setting it for a theatrical release on August 11, 2023.

Jules was released for digital platforms on September 12, 2023, followed by a Blu-ray and DVD release on October 10, 2023.
