= Walden (play) =

2021 play by Amy Berryman

- Original language: English
- Written by: Amy Berryman
- Genre: Climate fiction

Premiere
- Date: 22 May 2021
- Place: Harold Pinter Theatre, West End, London, United Kingdom
- Original run: 22 May – 12 June 2021

Berryman discusses Walden in 2025

Walden is a 2021 climate fiction play by American writer Amy Berryman. Named for the Henry David Thoreau work of the same name, it premiered on London's West End in 2021.

== Plot ==
In a near-future with worsening climate change and refugee crisis, and where synthetic foods, cloning, and war are common, Cassie, a NASA astronaut returned from a year-long lunar mission, visits her estranged fraternal twin sister Stella, and Stella's partner Bryan, at a remote cabin. Stella, a former NASA architect, designed a Mars habitat called Walden while at the agency. Cassie is about to begin training for a mission to Mars, where she will live in the Walden habitat. Stella, while still believing in NASA, now favors prioritizing the Earth, while Bryan is an "Earth Advocate" activist, and they argue with Cassie about space colonization. A love triangle develops.

== Production history ==
The play premiered at the Harold Pinter Theatre in London, opening on 22 May 2021, produced by Sonia Friedman. Directed by Ian Rickson, it starred Gemma Arterton as Stella, Lydia Wilson as Cassie, and Fehinti Balogun as Bryan.

Walden's American premiere was produced by TheaterWorks in Hartford, Connecticut, in July 2021, directed by Mei Ann Teo. Diana Oh played Stella. It was staged outdoors next to the Connecticut River. Each member of the audience was given a pair of headphones and bug spray, and the program was printed on a cardboard fan. The performance was also available to stream online.

In November 2024, the play was produced off-Broadway by Second Stage Theater in the Tony Kiser Theater, directed by Whitney White, featuring Zoë Winters as Cassie, Emmy Rossum as Stella, and Motell Foster as Bryan. It was Second Stage's last production at the Kiser.

Walden has had subsequent productions including at Premiere Stages in New Jersey, InterAct Theatre Company in Philadelphia, and ArtsWest in Seattle.

== Reception ==
Reviewing the 2021 London production for The Guardian, Arifa Akbar described the play as intelligent and soulful, giving it 3 out of 5 stars. In The Independent, Ava Wong Davies also gave it 3 out of 5, calling it a "confident and promising debut" but that it "ends up drifting in space." David Benedict wrote for Variety that it is a "play seeking to illuminate important scientific questions via personal ones and vice versa" and that the "writing is too on the nose for true empathy." For The Times Literary Supplement, Holly Williams wrote that approaching climate catastrophe through a family drama paid off, but that the play was "too controlled in its unravelling" and lacked "the messiness of real relationships."

The Hartford production was praised by critics. The Hartford Courant wrote that the outdoor staging was "ingenious," which enhanced the "lively dialogue." Reviewing the streaming version, Alexis Soloski of The New York Times said the play was poignant, and that, "While Berryman loads her play with vivid details and plenty of plot mechanics," she is animated by Thoreau's philosophical questions.

The off-Broadway production received mixed reviews. Jesse Green of The New York Times called the play "shallow." Sara Holdren praised the play in Vulture as an "intelligent and compassionate climate-disaster drama." Charles Isherwood wrote for the Wall Street Journal that Berryman's writing is "crisp," and judged the play "more successful as an exploration of knotty family conflicts than it is persuasive as a dystopian view of mankind's in-the-offing predicament" that was "occasionally undermined by detail."
