= Seven Sisters (TV series) =

Upcoming American family drama series

- Genre: Family drama
- Created by: Will Arbery
- Starring: Elizabeth Olsen; Cristin Milioti; Anthony Edwards; J. Smith-Cameron; Meredith Hagner; Odessa Young; Zoë Winters; Bridget Brown; Carolyn Kettig; Philip Ettinger; Ryan Eggold
- Country of origin: United States
- Original language: English

Production
- Executive producers: Will Arbery; Sean Durkin; Garrett Basch
- Production companies: Dive; FXP

Original release
- Network: FX; FX on Hulu

Seven Sisters is an upcoming television series created by Will Arbery and starring Elizabeth Olsen for FX.

== Premise ==
A large, tightknit family begins to unravel when one sister, Adrienne (Olsen) starts communicating with a voice no one else can hear, forcing each of them to confront long-buried secrets. Each of them develops a new power and the ramifications of their generational mental health oriented unfurl the becomings of their time.

== Cast ==
- Elizabeth Olsen as Adrienne
- Cristin Milioti
- Anthony Edwards as Paul Bosco
- J. Smith-Cameron as Francesca
- Meredith Hagner
- Odessa Young
- Zoë Winters
- Bridget Brown
- Carolyn Kettig
- Philip Ettinger
- Ryan Eggold

== Production ==
=== Development ===
On March 12, 2025, Deadline reported that FX had given a pilot order to Seven Sisters from playwright Will Arbery, whom is set to serve as writer and executive producer, alongside Sean Durkin, who was set to direct the pilot, and Garrett Basch. On December 16, 2025, the pilot was picked up to series.

=== Casting ===
Alongside the pilot order, it was also announced that Elizabeth Olsen would star in the pilot. In March 2025, Cristin Milioti, Anthony Edwards and J. Smith-Cameron were cast in the pilot. In April 2025, Meredith Hagner, Odessa Young, Zoë Winters, Bridget Brown, Carolyn Kettig, Philip Ettinger, and Ryan Eggold joined the cast.

=== Filming ===
The production is expected to commence on November 23, 2026 and continue through March 5, 2027 in Vancouver.
