= Heritage Action =

American conservative policy advocacy organization

- Formation: 2010; 16 years ago
- Type: 501(c)4 organization
- Tax ID no.: 27-2244700
- Purpose: Lobbying and advocacy
- Headquarters: Washington, D.C., U.S.
- President: Kevin Roberts
- Executive Vice President: Steve Chartan
- Affiliations: The Heritage Foundation
- Revenue: $15.5 million (2024)
- Website: heritageaction.com

Heritage Action, founded in 2010 as Heritage Action for America, is a conservative advocacy organization. Heritage Action, which has affiliates throughout the United States, is a sister organization of the Heritage Foundation, a Washington, D.C.-based conservative think tank founded in 1973.

== History ==
=== Founding ===
In April 2010, Edwin Feulner, then president of the Heritage Foundation, announced the founding of Heritage Action as a sister organization of the Heritage Foundation, saying its purpose would be to harness "grassroots energy to increase the pressure on members of Congress to embrace the Heritage Foundation’s policy recommendations". He also said Heritage Action would not be involved in election campaigns. Heritage Action's goal was to expand the political reach of the Heritage Foundation and advance the policies recommended by its researchers. The organization was launched primarily as a response to the Heritage Foundation's growing membership, and the fact that the Heritage Foundation is not allowed to back legislation due to its 501(c)(3) tax-exempt status. Heritage Action fulfills this role and provides a link between the think tank and grassroots conservative activists. Heritage Action began with a staff of ten, including original chief executive officer Michael Needham.

=== Obama administration ===
In July 2010, Heritage Action launched its first advocacy campaign, opposing the Affordable Care Act (ACA), also known as Obamacare, a health care reform law supported by then president Barack Obama. By August 2010, the organization had helped to secure 170 Republican co-sponsors for a petition by U.S. representative Steve King (R-IA) to force a vote on repealing the ACA. In September 2010, the group began a 10-day television and web campaign to persuade Democrats to sign onto a repeal of the ACA.

In January 2011, the group opened its first state-based operations in two states, North Carolina and Pennsylvania, where the organization focused on mobilizing voters in opposing the ACA.

In August 2013, Heritage Action launched a campaign to defund or restrict the ACA by linking it to votes on the federal government's debt limit. In October 2013, as part of this campaign, the organization was instrumental in the government shutdown, which ultimately did not defund or limit the ACA and proved politically unpopular. During the shutdown, Heritage Action continued to urge lawmakers not to negotiate a measure to fully fund the government without dismantling the ACA. Heritage Action's strategy in tying the ACA to the shutdown was to make President Obama "feel pain" because of the shutdown, the organization's leader Michael Needham said. U.S. senator Orrin Hatch, a Republican from Utah, criticized Heritage Action for warning legislators not to vote for the Senate budget compromise during the government shutdown.

In October 2013, Heritage Action was labeled a "powerhouse in a new generation of conservative groups" by HuffPost and "perhaps now the most influential lobby group among Congressional Republicans" by The New York Times.

=== 2016 presidential campaign ===
After Donald Trump announced his candidacy for the 2016 Republican presidential nomination, Michael Needham, then leader of Heritage Action, said, "Donald Trump's a clown. He needs to be out of the race."

=== First Trump administration ===
In May 2018, Timothy Chapman succeeded Needham as executive director, following Needham's departure. Chapman previously served as Heritage Action's chief operating officer and as chief of staff to Heritage Foundation President Edwin Feulner. In March 2020, Chapman left the organization.

In 2020, Jessica Anderson, who joined Heritage Action as grassroots director in 2010, began leading the organization. Anderson served for a year in 2017 in the Office of Management and Budget during the Trump administration. She returned to Heritage Action as vice president in 2018, and was named executive director in 2020.

In July 2024, Anderson took a leave of absence in July 2023 and Ryan Walker was named Acting Executive Director, serving in that role until Heritage Foundation president Kevin Roberts was named president of Heritage Action in September 2023. Roberts serves Heritage Action and the Heritage Foundation in a joint role. Walker served as executive vice president of Heritage Action until June 2025.

On July 28, 2025, Tiffany Justice, co-founder of Moms for Liberty, was named executive vice president of Heritage Action. Justice stepped down from her role in March 2026 “to pursue voter engagement work" in a different capacity, according to Heritage Action.

Heritage Action announced in April 2026 that Steve Chartan, the vice president of government relations at The Heritage Foundation, would serve as its next executive vice president.

In April 2020, the organization says it conducted grassroots work, including door-to-door issue canvassing in Iowa, North Carolina, Pennsylvania, and Wisconsin. Due to the COVID-19 pandemic, some of these efforts were replaced for a time by phone calls.

In August 2020, Heritage Action launched a pro-police pledge "for citizens, lawmakers and candidates to stand with [the] nation's law enforcement officers". Over 100 members of Congress signed the pledge. The pledge was accompanied by pro-police billboards by the group in New York City, Dallas, and Atlanta.

=== Biden administration ===
Following the 2020 presidential election, Heritage Action drafted and lobbied in favor of new election legislation as part of Republican efforts to tighten election laws. In May 2021, in a leaked video of a presentation to donors, Jessica Anderson, the organization's executive director at the time, citing Iowa as an example, saying, "we did it quickly and we did it quietly...Little fanfare. Honestly, nobody even noticed. My team looked at each other and we're like, 'It can't be that easy'."

As part of the organization's efforts on tightening election laws, it maintains a database, which includes 1,322 "proven instances of voter fraud" dating back to the mid-1980s, but includes only one case from the 2020 election. Some of the cases in the database are also fraudulent voter registration incidents, rather than voter fraud.

In 2021, according to an internal Heritage Action document, a "two-year effort" was planned to work with like-minded groups to "produce model legislation for state legislatures to adopt" and hire lobbyists in "crucial states". The same year, Heritage Action published a report in which it listed its objectives as limiting who can vote by mail, preventing ballot collection, banning drop boxes, enacting stricter voter identification laws, restricting early voting, and providing greater access to partisan election observers.

== Heritage Action congressional scorecard ==
Heritage Action issues a congressional scorecard, which ranks members of Congress on "votes, co-sponsorships and other legislative activity". It also has established a grassroots presence outside of Washington, D.C., with professional grassroots coordinators who recruit and train conservative "Sentinel" activists.

== Funding ==
As of 2022, Heritage Action had annual revenue of $20.9 million, according to its filing with the Internal Revenue Service, reported by ProPublica.
