= Wyoming Catholic College =

Private Catholic liberal arts college in Lander, Wyoming, U.S.

Coordinates: 42°49′11″N 108°44′26″W

- Motto: (Officially) Verum, Bonum, Pulchrum; (Unofficially) Wisdom in God's Country; Born in Wonder, Brought to Wisdom
- Type: Private college
- Established: July 11, 2005 (21 years ago)
- Founders: David L. Ricken; Robert Cook; Robert Carlson
- Accreditation: HLC (Note: accreditation obtained 15 November 2018)
- Religious affiliation: Catholic
- President: Kyle Washut
- Dean: J. Scott Olsson
- Faculty: 21
- Students: 193 (2023–2024)
- Location: Lander, Wyoming, United States
- Campus: Rural
- Language: English, Latin
- Nickname: WCC
- Website: wyomingcatholic.edu

Wyoming Catholic College (WCC) is a private Catholic college in Lander, Wyoming, United States. WCC is the only Catholic college or university in the state. It is notable for its extensive outdoor education program, requiring all freshmen students to both complete a 21-day backpacking trip and engage in other outdoor activities while studying a Great Books academic curriculum.

== History ==
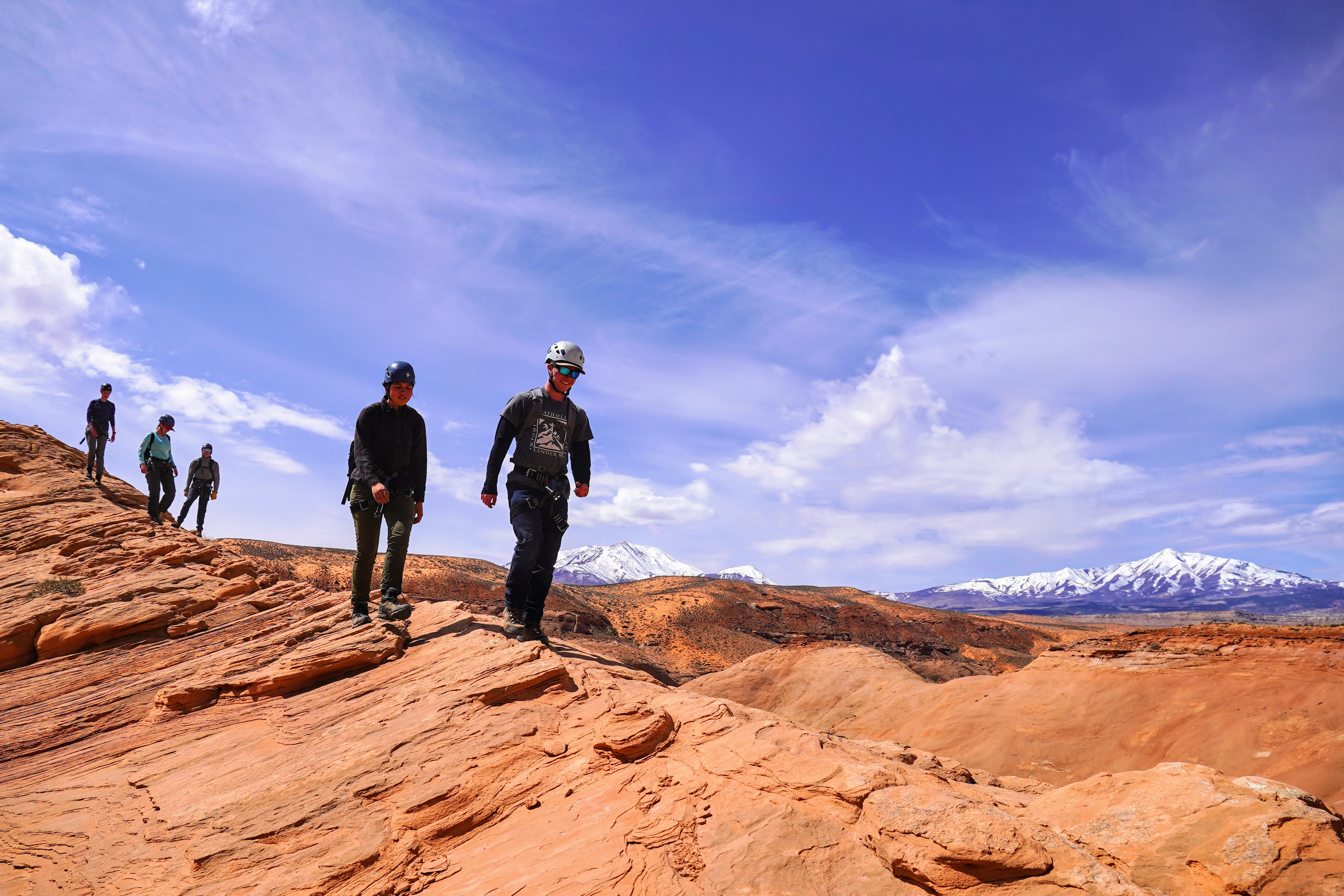
Wyoming Catholic College students on an outdoor trip in the spring of 2024.

In 2003, then-bishop of Wyoming David Ricken expressed interest in having a Catholic college in Wyoming. Together with a parish priest of the Diocese of Cheyenne, Robert Cook, and the Wyoming professor Robert Carlson, the bishop began forming plans to found the college. In 2004 and 2005, Lander Wyoming was selected as the location, and Carlson wrote the philosophical vision statement of the college. On July 11, 2005, Wyoming Catholic College incorporated in the state of Wyoming with Cook as president and Carlson as academic dean.

=== Accreditation and federal funding ===
In 2014, the college became a candidate for accreditation by the Higher Learning Commission (HLC). During this time, the college's leadership decided to forgo access to federal funding. According to Inside Higher Ed, this decision was "partly out of concerns that accepting the funds could impair its ability to set its own policies around issues of sexual orientation and gender identity," and as of 2023, the college's website described this decision as being largely motivated by a concern that accepting this funding would allow the government to impose on the college's hiring and admission policies, such as birth control and same-sex marriage. In an interview with Wyoming Public Radio, college president Kevin Roberts clarified that the college was specifically concerned about harassment from outside special interest groups, particularly with regards to Title IX policies for single-gender housing and restroom facilities. Roberts was also a notable opponent to the Affordable Care Act, suing the state of Wyoming over implementing the program.

WCC achieved full accreditation status from HLC in 2018. During the COVID-19 pandemic, WCC received $1.3 million in aid, including a $739,000 PPP loan, which has been forgiven.

=== 2021 firing of CFO ===
In 2020 Paul McCown, a former Michigan politician and the school's chief financial officer (CFO) of two years, launched the distillery Sweetwater Spirits, which switched to producing hand sanitizer at the onset of the COVID-19 pandemic. In early 2021 he used claims of wealth from this business to secure a $15 million loan from investment firm Ria R Squared, before anonymously donating two-thirds of those funds to the college. McCown also received $2 million in federally backed PPP loans, and was fired by the school in June 2021 when his fraudulent activity was discovered. A subsequent internal investigation led to the dismissal of the school's director of horsemanship because of payments made with McCown's approval. Although plans for expansion utilizing the $10 million donation were underway, WCC's President Arbery stated that "the setback to the college’s expansion plans did not pose an actual threat to the institution's financial stability". Wyoming Catholic College initially stated that it would return the entire sum to Ria R Squared once it completed an internal investigation into the alleged fraud. On December 6, 2021, Ria R Squared sued Wyoming Catholic College, alleging that the college had not yet returned a portion of that sum (totaling $239,154), and that the college’s counsel had told Ria R Squared that it no longer intended to return the sum.

=== Presidents ===
- 2007–2013: Robert Cook
- 2013–2016: Kevin Roberts
- 2016–2023: Glenn Arbery
- 2023–present: Kyle Washut

== Campus locations ==
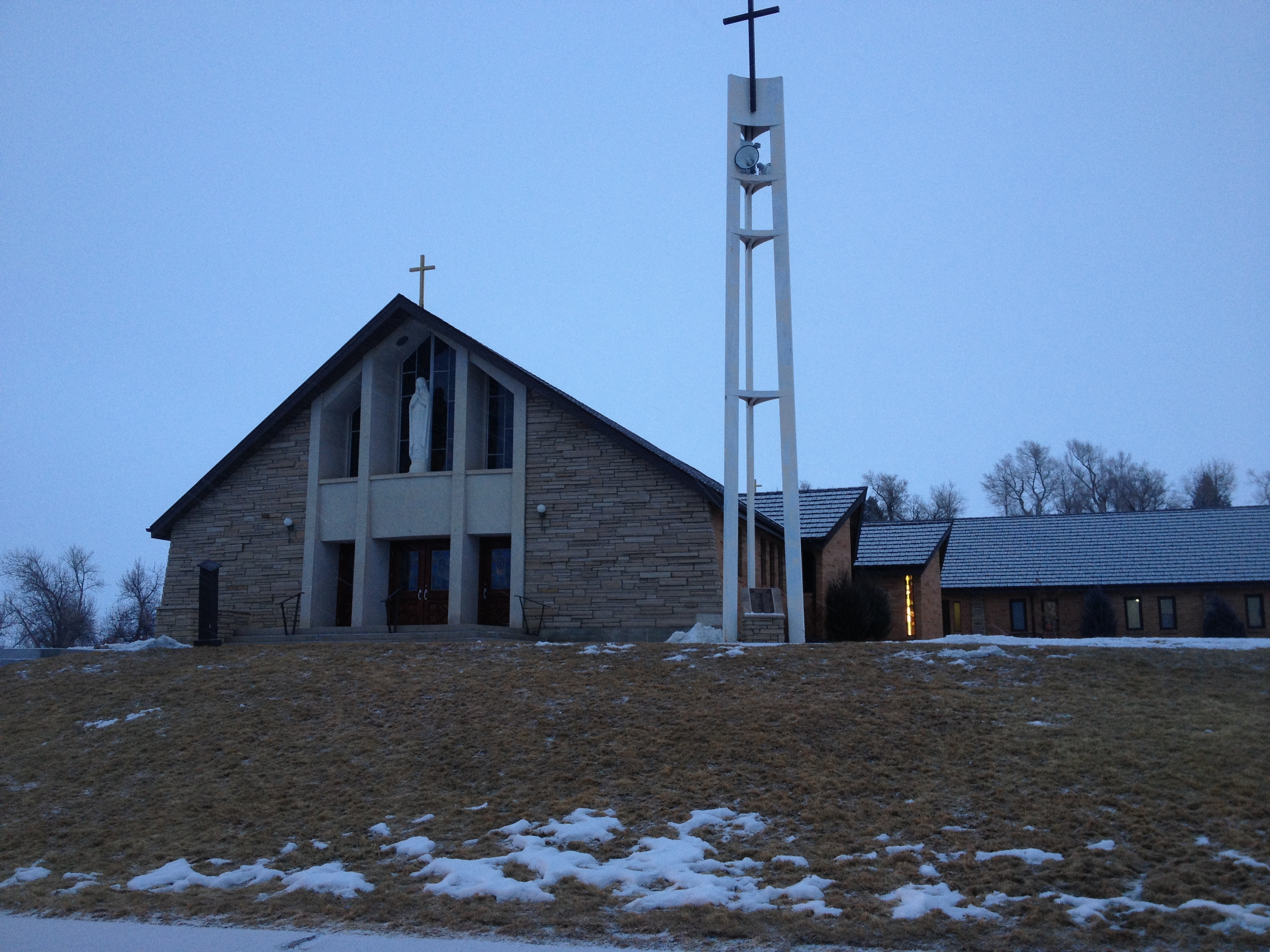
Church of the Holy Rosary, which is shared with the local parish

The college is located in an area within the Rocky Mountains, in the town of Lander, Wyoming. The college campus consists of multiple facilities around the town of Lander, mostly in the downtown area.

=== Downtown Campus ===
The Downtown Campus comprises several historic buildings of downtown Lander, including:

- The Baldwin Building (main reception, offices, classrooms, library, student lounge, and Crux Coffee)
- Orchard Building (offices, classrooms, library)
- Augur Building (classrooms, study area and lounge, Chesterton Library)
- St Joseph’s Hall (headquarters of COR Expeditions)
- Immaculate Conception Oratory (Catholic chapel)
- Frassati Hall (hosting the main dining facility)

=== Holy Rosary facilities ===
Located on the property of the diocesan parish of Holy Rosary in Lander, this "campus" includes a number of the residence halls. The college occasionally uses the parish church for special occasions, like graduation. In the first years of the college, some of the parish facilities were used as classrooms.

=== Other facilities ===
Additional facilities of the college include the Horse Barn (hosting the college's horsemanship program) located several miles outside of Lander, and residence halls converted from a Holiday Lodge Hotel near the north-east edge of Lander.

== Academics ==
Because it offers a four-year, integrated, Great Books curriculum, Wyoming Catholic College has no majors, minors, specialized degrees or graduate programs; it awards graduating students the degree of Bachelor of Arts in Liberal Arts. As of Fall 2021, there were over 190 students enrolled.

In the spring of 2016, Wyoming Catholic College became the second college in the nation to accept the Classic Learning Test (CLT) as an alternative to the SAT and ACT for college admissions. The college is also recommended by The Newman Guide to Choosing a Catholic College, and its curriculum has received an "A" rating from American Council of Trustees and Alumni.

The curriculum was designed to give students a general liberal arts education through a study of the Great Books. Courses include Humanities, Theology, Philosophy, Math/Science, Fine Arts, Latin, Trivium, and Leadership.

=== Faculty ===
Notable former Wyoming Catholic professors include traditionalist author and speaker Peter Kwasniewski.

=== Accreditation ===
WCC is accredited by the Higher Learning Commission.

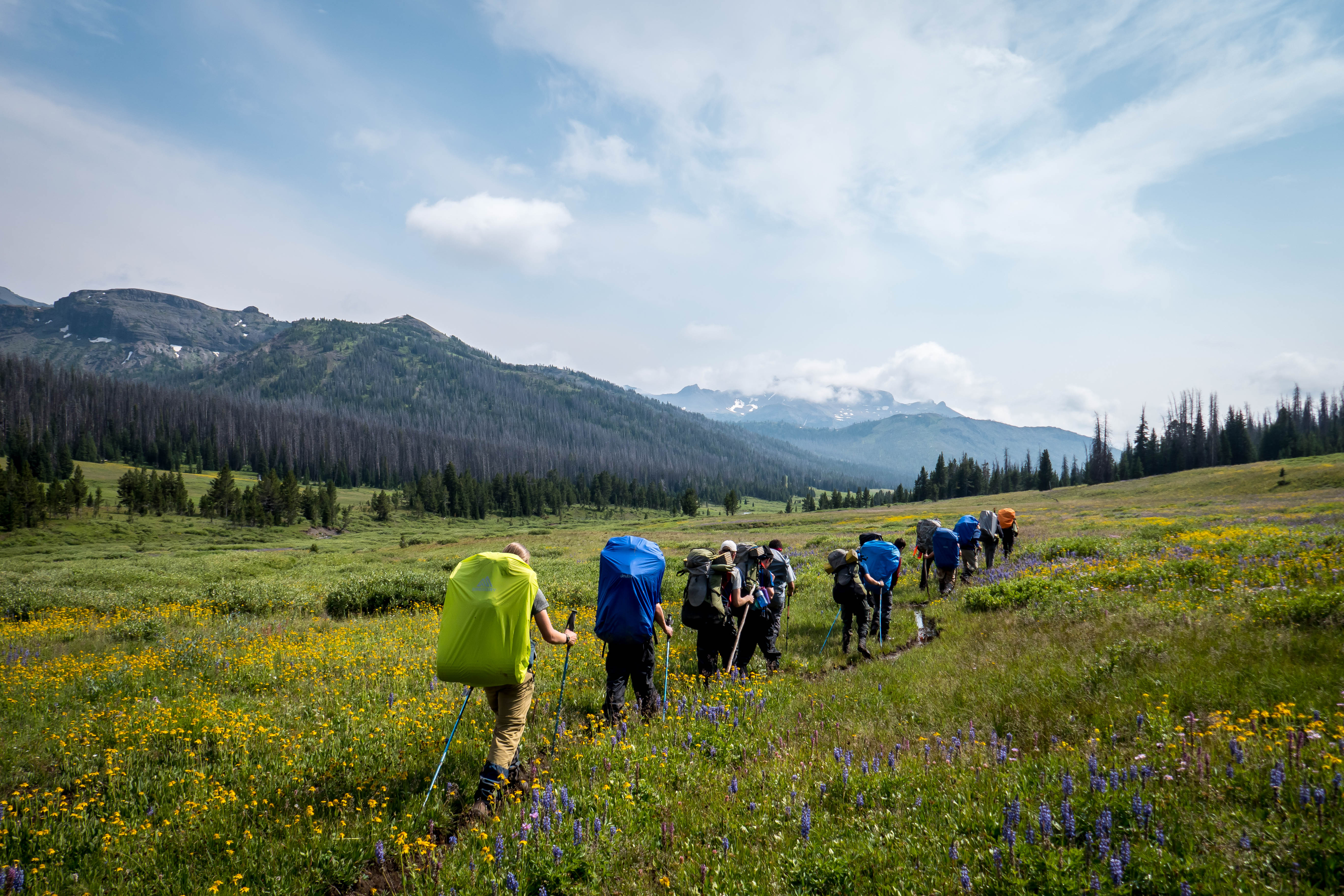
Freshmen hike in the Teton Mountains during a three-week backpacking course.

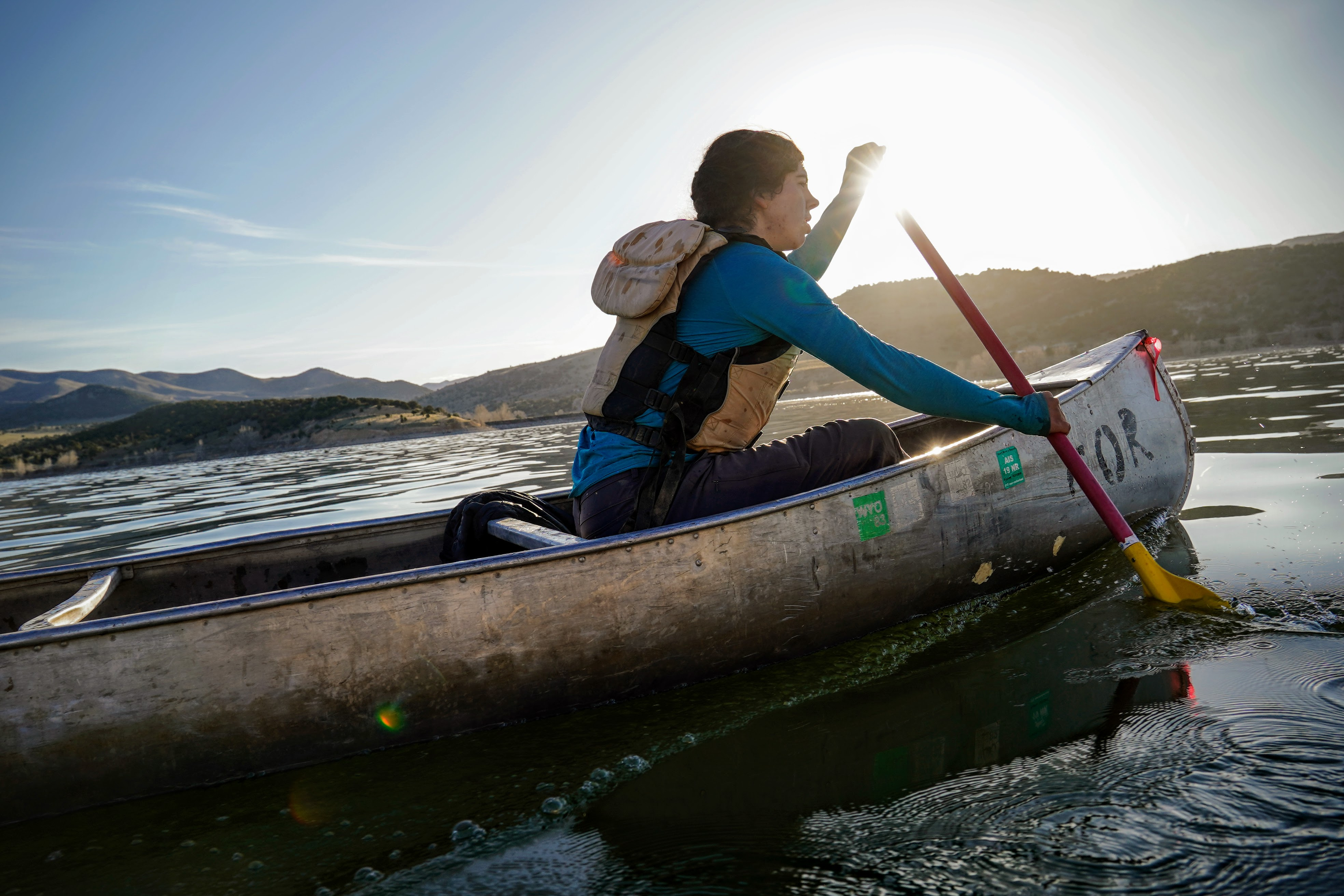
Wyoming Catholic College students canoeing as part of the Outdoor Education Program at Wyoming Catholic College.

=== Outdoors ===
Along with its liberal arts classroom program, Wyoming Catholic College provides all students with a series of experientially-based outdoor leadership expeditions taught through what it calls the Outdoor Leadership Program (OLP). Freshmen begin their four-year educational journey with a three-week backpacking trip in the Rocky Mountains, which the college considers "the most unusual and meaningful orientation program in the country". Every year, students participate in at least two separate "outdoor weeks" or short courses in outdoors skills held over spring and fall break. Courses have been held in backpacking, canoeing or sea kayaking, canyoneering, fishing, horse packing, ice climbing, mountain biking, mountaineering, rock climbing, skiing, and whitewater rafting and kayaking. All students also participate in the equestrian program, are certified in Wilderness First Aid, and have the opportunity to pursue certification as Wilderness First Responders.

As an outreach from its student outdoor program, Wyoming Catholic College also runs contract outdoor custom and open enrollment outdoor courses through its branch of COR Expeditions.

== Student life ==
At the beginning of their first year, students at WCC spend 21 days hiking in the Rocky Mountains. This is a mandatory part of the college's freshman orientation program.

=== Student body ===
WCC admitted its first class in 2007, which consisted of 34 students. The largest class ever accepted was 68 freshmen in 2021. Today, it has a student body of about 190. The college has students from most of the US states, as well as several from foreign countries including Ireland, Ukraine, and Malawi.

=== Technology policy ===
The college does not allow televisions on campus. It also does not allow students to access the Internet from the dorm except for their college e-mail and specific websites that are required for their coursework. Students are also prohibited from using mobile devices, including smart phones, on campus; they must be surrendered to the college while on campus. These policies have been suspended at times, for example during the fall 2019 semester when the campus experienced problems with landline phone and Internet connections. However, while controversial, both students and educational establishments have often had positive things to say regarding the limitation of technology. In July 2023, Inside Higher Ed published an article featuring Wyoming Catholic as representative of a trend that helps "students destress and build community".

=== Cowboys for Life ===
"Cowboys for Life" is Wyoming Catholic’s branch of the national Students for Life organization and Wyoming Catholic students regularly participate in Pro-Life activism. Wyoming Catholic students were involved in the first Lander "March for Life" in 2020, and "40-Days for Life" peaceful protest.

=== Chaplaincy ===
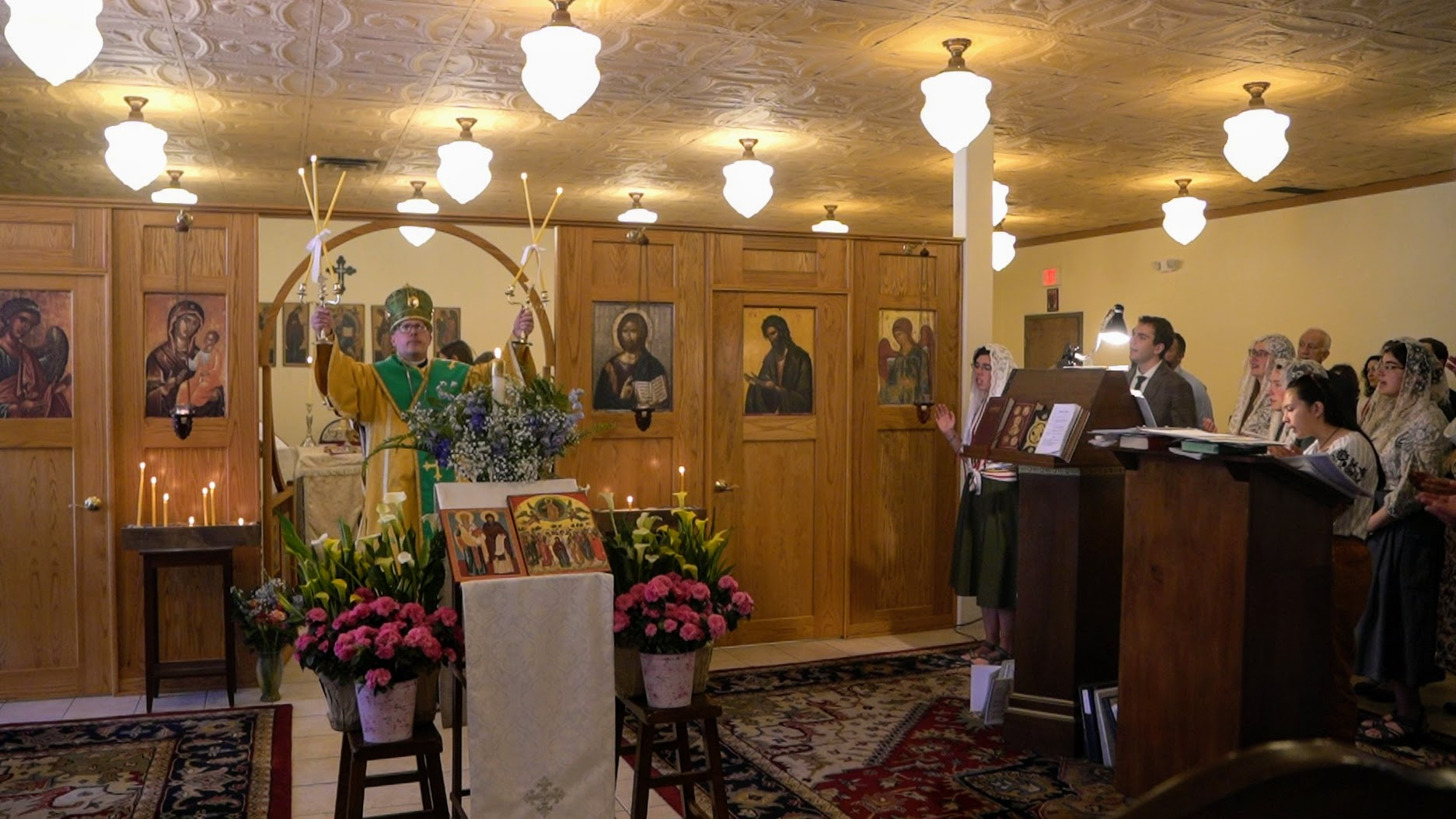
Bishop Robert Pipta, Eparch of Parma in the American Ruthenian Catholic Church, celebrates Byzantine Liturgy at Wyoming Catholic College's Byzantine Chapel.

The college offers Catholic liturgies in both the Roman and Byzantine rites, including the Traditional Latin Mass, the Novus Ordo and the Liturgy of St John Chrysostom. In the spring of 2024, Wyoming Catholic College became the fifth site in the world to have a shrine dedicated to "Mary, Mother of Persecuted Christians." The Icon and shrine were facilitated by Fr. Benedict Kiely, an advocate for persecuted Christians in the Middle East.

=== Dry campus and dress code ===
Wyoming Catholic has a dry campus and a code of conduct that "prohibits visitation between the sexes in student residence halls", as well as "sexual activity outside the confines of a marriage". The college also has a dress code for various occasions including academic seminars.

== Finances ==
The fiscal year for the college is from the beginning of July to the end of June of the following calendar year. Finances for the fiscal year ending 30 June 2020 (Note: as shown on IRS Form-990 yr2019) consisted of a revenue of $10,070,665; expenses of $9,934,076, and donations of $3,231,669.

== Cultural references ==
The college was the inspiration for the setting of the 2019 play Heroes of the Fourth Turning by Will Arbery, which was nominated for the Pulitzer Prize in drama. Will Arbery is the son of a former president of the college, Glenn Cannon Arbery.

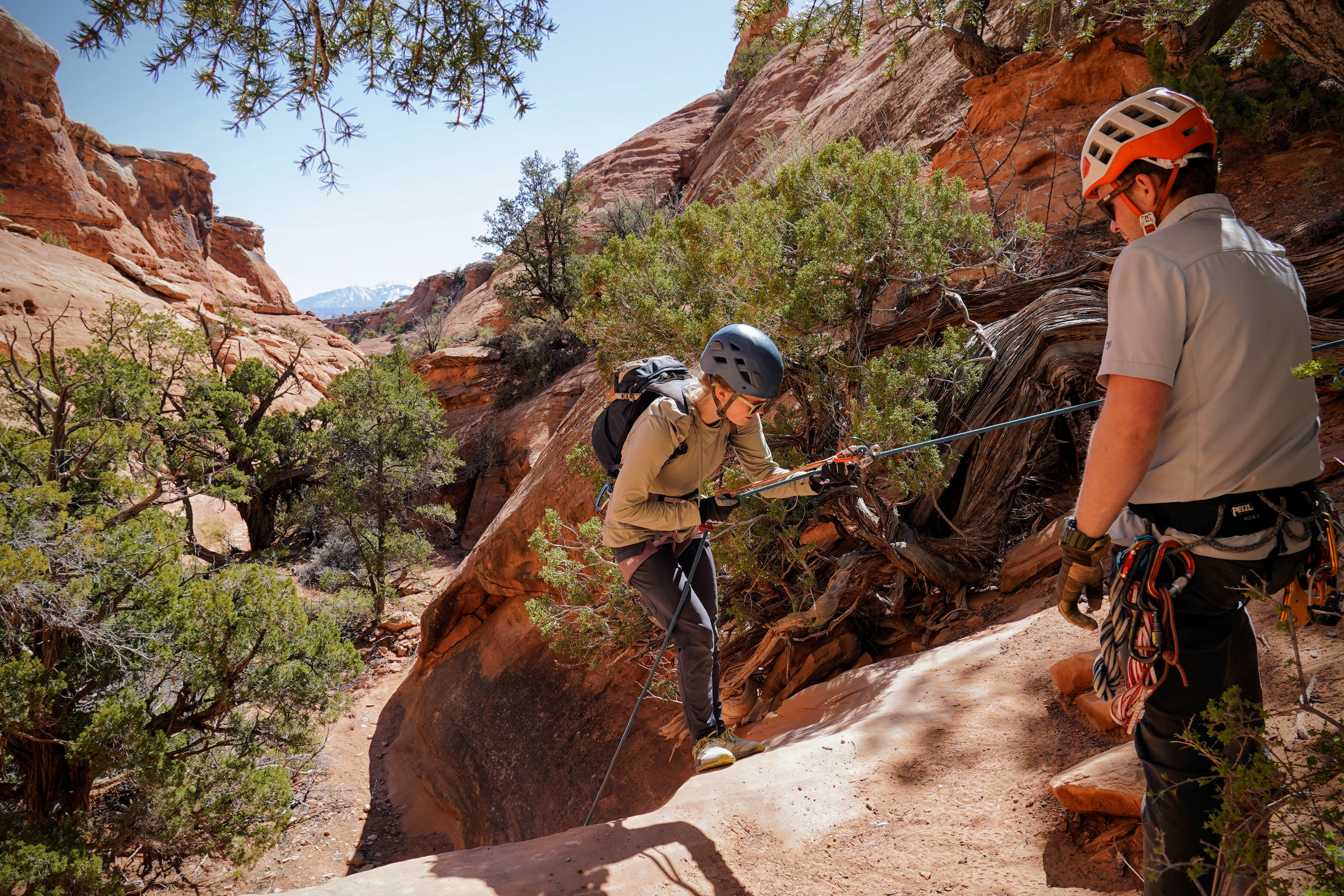
Wyoming Catholic College students rappelling during an outdoor week instruction

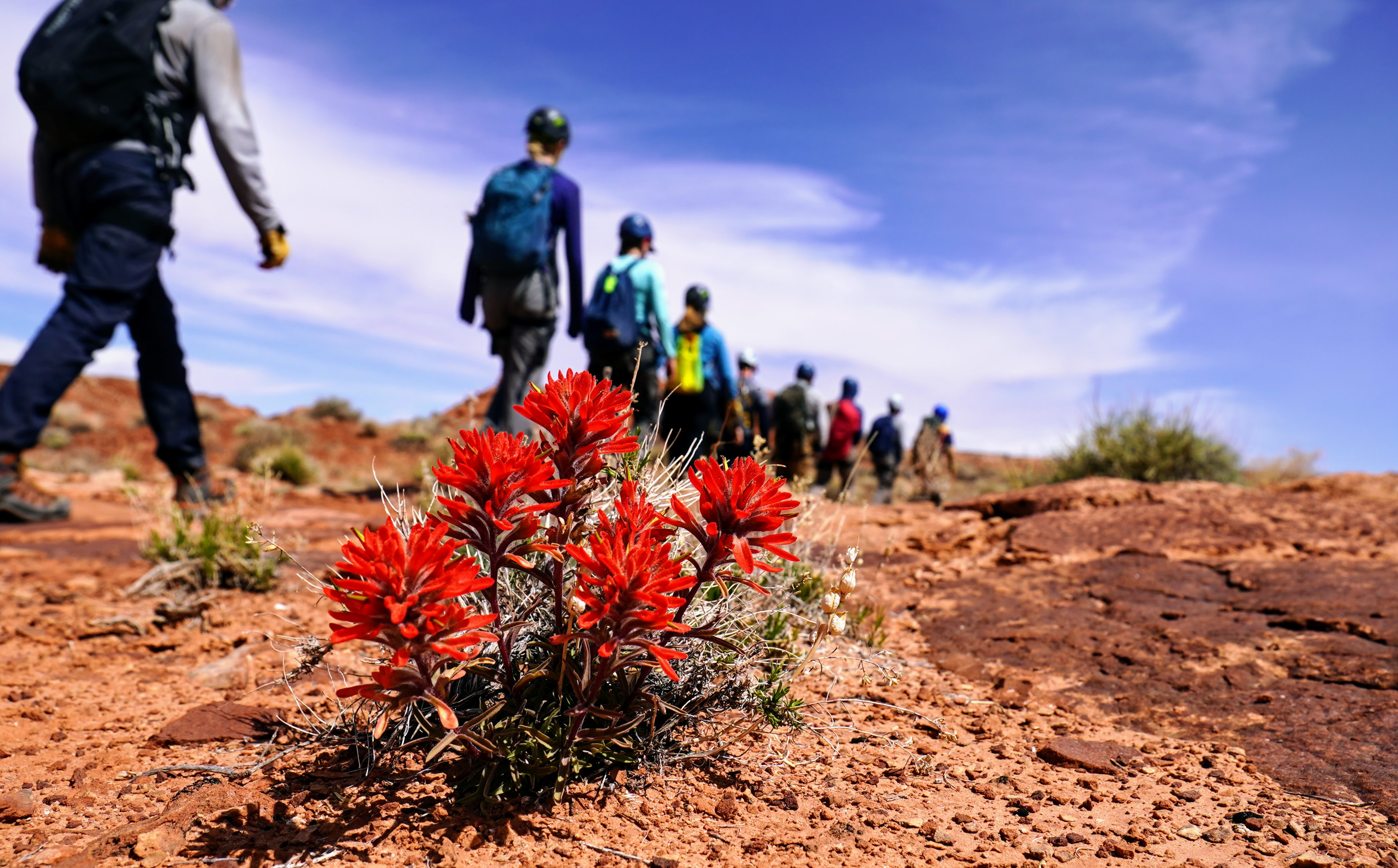
Wyoming Catholic students hiking

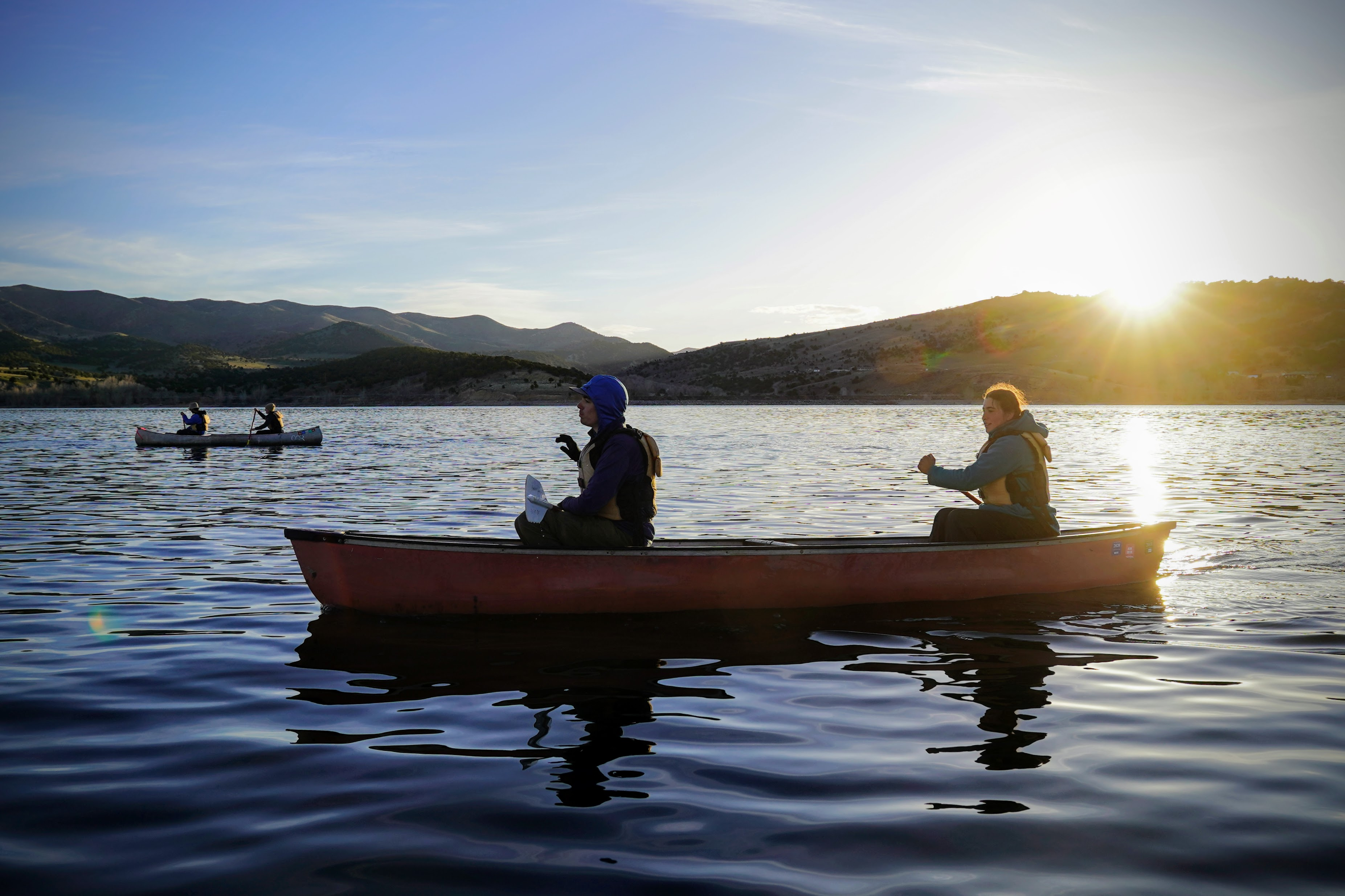
Wyoming Catholic students canoeing

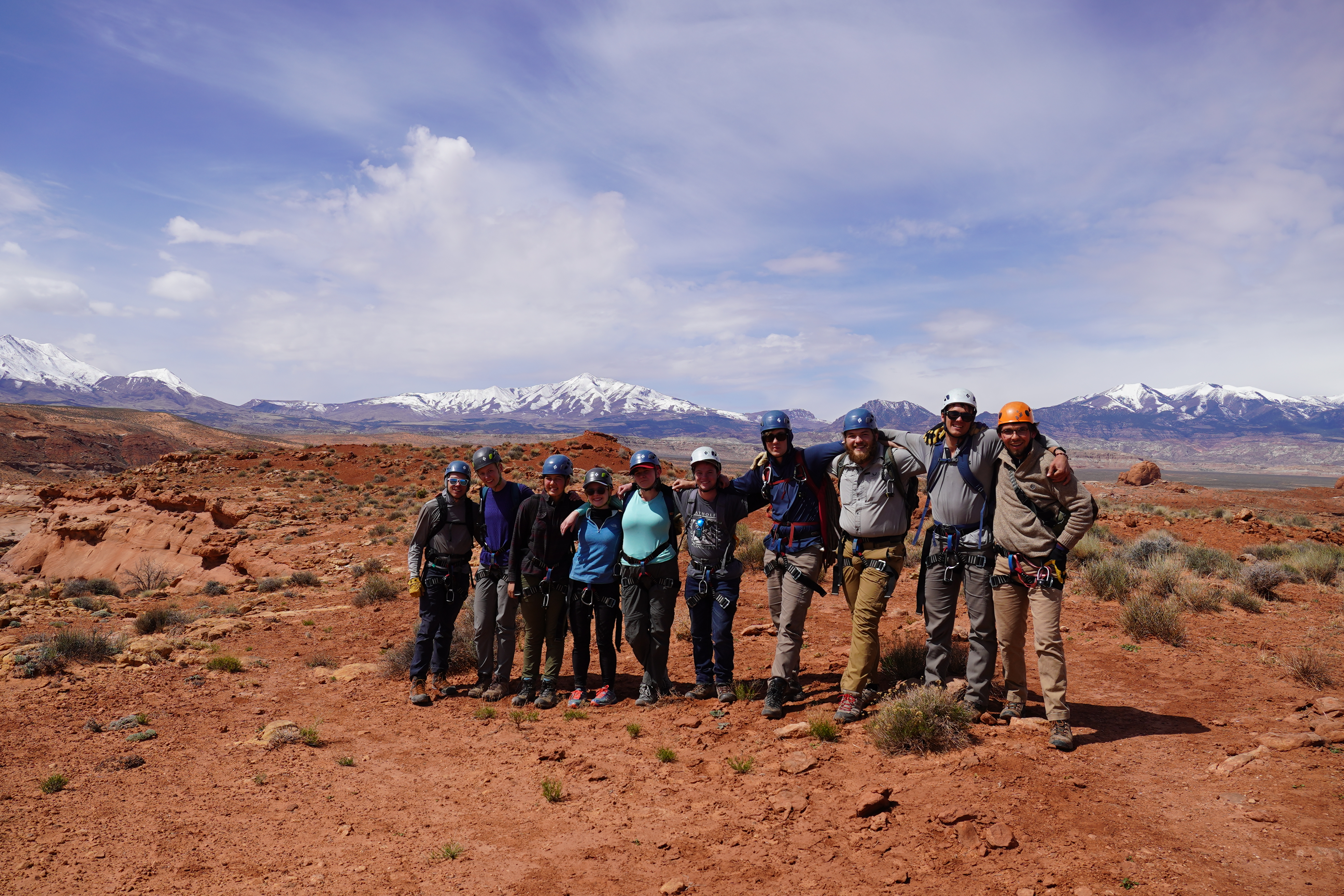
Wyoming Catholic students on an outdoor trip

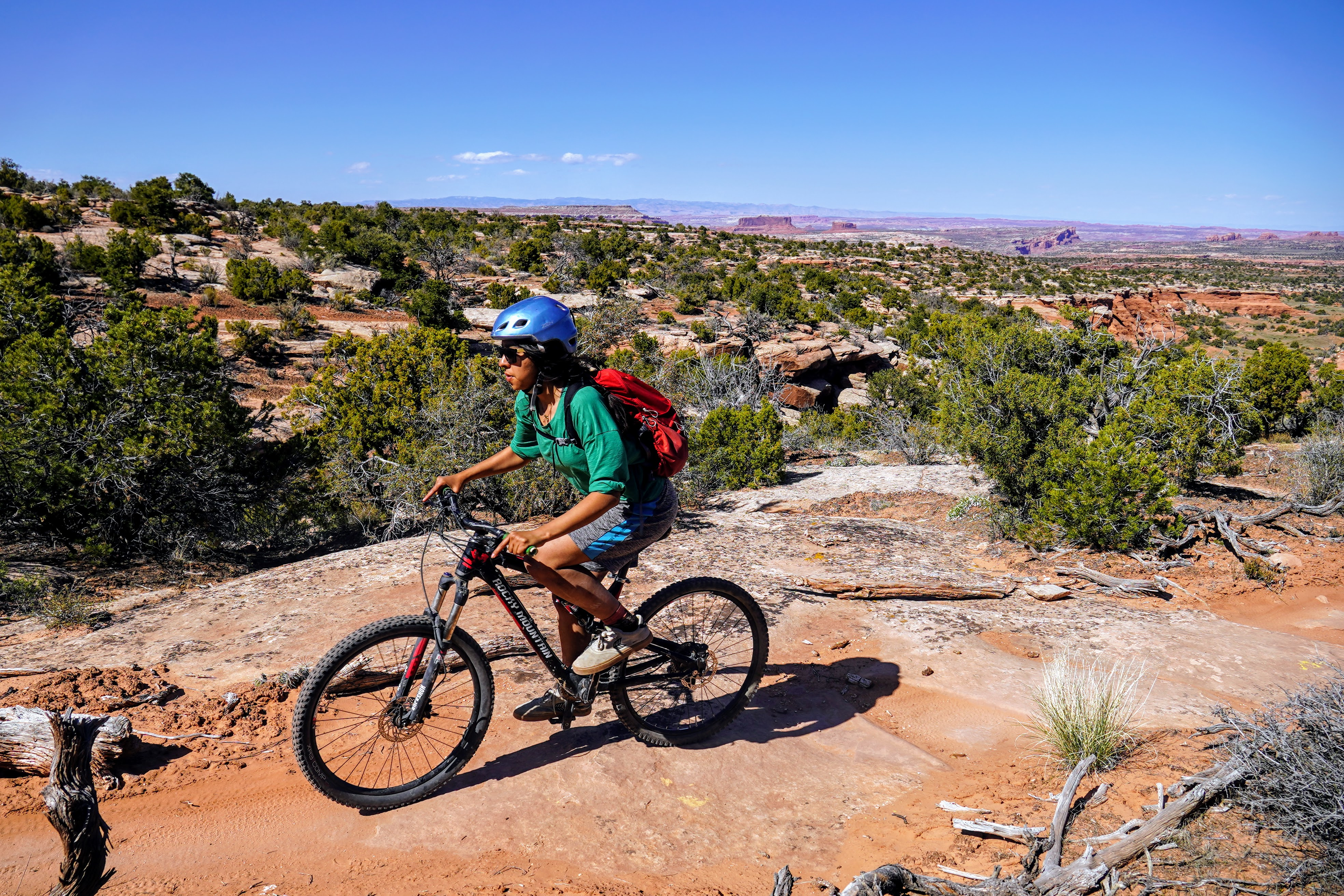
Wyoming Catholic student mountain biking in Utah
