= Glenn Arbery =

American academic

3rd President of Wyoming Catholic College
- In office August 28, 2016 – August 20, 2023
- Preceded by: Kevin Roberts
- Succeeded by: Kyle Washut

Personal details
- Born: Glenn Cannon Arbery; 1951 (age 73–74); South Carolina, U.S.
- Spouse: Virginia Lombardo
- Children: 8, including Will
- Education: University of Georgia (BA); University of Dallas (PhD)

Glenn Cannon Arbery (born 1951) is an American academic and Catholic scholar, and faculty member Wyoming Catholic College, where he served as president from 2016 to 2023, succeeded by Kyle Washut. He is the author of the novels Boundaries of Eden and Bearings and Distances, and of the book Why Literature Matters. Arbery received his doctoral education at the University of Dallas, earning a doctorate in literature and politics.

He is the father of playwright Will Arbery.
