= James Sidbury =

American historian

James Sidbury is an American historian who studies race and slavery in the English-speaking Atlantic world. Sidbury is currently the Andrew W. Mellon Distinguished Professor of Humanities at Rice University and he is a published author.

Sidbury is the author of Ploughshares into Swords: Race, Rebellion, and Identity in Gabriel's Virginia, 1730–1810 (1997) and Becoming African in America: Race and Nation in the Early Black Atlantic, 1760–1830 (2007). He co-authored the influential "Mapping Ethnogenesis in the Early Modern Atlantic" (2011) with Jorge Cañizares-Esguerra. Sidbury is also the co-editor of The Black Urban Atlantic in the Age of the Slave Trade (2013).
