= Will Arbery =

21st-century American playwright

Will Arbery is an American playwright and screenwriter, known for his plays Heroes of the Fourth Turning, Plano, and Evanston Salt Costs Climbing. Heroes of the Fourth Turning was a finalist for the 2020 Pulitzer Prize for Drama and Arbery was the recipient of the 2020 Whiting Award for Drama.

== Early life and education ==
Arbery was born in Nashua, New Hampshire, but grew up in Dallas, Texas, the only boy in a family of seven sisters. He attended Cistercian Preparatory School in Irving, Texas. His parents, Glenn and Virginia Arbery, taught at the Dallas Institute of Humanities and Culture before relocating to Wyoming, where they both taught at Wyoming Catholic College. Arbery's father took over as president of the college in 2016. Arbery received his BA in English and drama from Kenyon College in 2011 and his MFA in writing for the screen and stage from the Northwestern University School of Communication in 2015.

== Career ==
Plano was first produced by Clubbed Thumb as a part of their 2018 Summerworks season, followed by an off-Broadway run at The Connelly Theater in 2019. The New Yorker described the play as a "David Lynch script performed as screwball comedy"; Helen Shaw, writing in Time Out New York, wrote "It's delicious to see a playwright binding genres so confidently (body-double horror and rueful family comedy), but the real pleasure is in how much Plano manages to bend how you perceive reality beyond the proscenium"; and Vulture proclaimed that "Plano is a fiercely smart contemporary dream play".

=== Heroes Of The Fourth Turning ===
In October 2019, Arbery received critical acclaim for his play Heroes of the Fourth Turning, which made its world premiere off-Broadway at Playwrights Horizons. The play explores a group of young Catholic intellectuals at a college reunion. Arbery's idea for the play "crystallized" after he was dissatisfied with what he considered as shallow media coverage of Trump supporters after the 2016 presidential election. It was named one of the best plays of 2019 by The New York Times and one of the eight pieces of Pop Culture that Defined the Trump Era by Politico.

Heroes of the Fourth Turning went on to win a number of awards, including being named a finalist for the Pulitzer Prize in Drama. According to Jesse Green of The New York Times, this "astonishing new play", directed "with nerves of steel" by Danya Taymor, "explores the lives and ideas of conservatives with affection, understanding and deep knowledge — if not, ultimately, approval".

According to Sarah Holdren of New York magazine, "Will Arbery's Heroes of the Fourth Turning is so frighteningly well written, it's hard to write about... Arbery's world [is] murky yet lit by lightning, lyrical and scary, brave and terribly gentle. Arbery is a virtuoso of dream language and logic. He's an unostentatious surrealist—a Magritte, not a Dali—rigorous and playful and full of love for his subjects, even when, as in Heroes, those subjects are themselves fraught with confusion, aggression, and fearful, fearsome indoctrination."

Vinson Cunningham of The New Yorker called the play "a formally lovely, subtly horrifying play about the death rattle of ideologies and the thin line between devotion and delusion".

=== Film and television ===
In 2023, Arbery worked as a writer on the HBO series Succession. He co-wrote the season 4 episode 6, Living+ with Georgia Pritchett. For their work on the episode, he shared Television: Dramatic Series award with Pritchett in 76th Writers Guild of America Awards (2024). He also won the category of Television: Dramatic Series at the same ceremony.

In 2025, he co-wrote the movie Sacrifice with Romain Gavras who also directed. The film had its world premiere in the Special Presentations section of the 2025 Toronto International Film Festival on September 6, 2025 and will premiere on Netflix.

In recently, he serves as a creator and executive producer of the upcoming FX series Seven Sisters which was greenlighted in December 2025. In June 2026, it was announced that Arbery will serve as a writer and exectuive producer of the upcoming FX limited series The Marriage Plot, which is based on the novel of the same name by Jeffrey Eugenides, starring Sadie Sink.

== Style ==
Upon receiving the Whiting Award, the committee said "Despite their wit and charm, Will Arbery's complicated and generous plays are deadly serious... Intellectually audacious, formally sly, he has the courage to let these characters seize the stage with impassioned arguments about morality and meaning. He knows how to make ideas incandescent in time and space and his ear for the rhythms of speech is impeccable, yet he always cracks a window in naturalism, letting a shaft of eeriness in. His writing moves to the beat of multiple metronomes: the rhythm of thought, the counterpoint of competing logics, the heartbeat of human longing."

== Works ==
- Heroes of the Fourth Turning, 2019, Playwrights Horizons
- Plano, 2018, Clubbed Thumb
- Evanston Salt Costs Climbing, 2018, New Neighborhood
- Corsicana, development at Playwrights Horizons & Ojai Playwrights Conference
- Wheelchair, 3 Hole Press
- You Hateful Things, development at the Public, SPACE on Ryder Farm, and NYTW Dartmouth Residency

== Awards and honors ==
- 2020: Heroes of the Fourth Turning – Pulitzer Prize Finalist for Drama
- 2020: Whiting Award for Drama
- 2020: Heroes of the Fourth Turning – Obie Award for Playwriting
- 2020: Heroes of the Fourth Turning – New York Drama Critics Circle Award for Best Play
- 2020: Heroes of the Fourth Turning – Lucille Lortel Award for Best Play
- 2020: Heroes of the Fourth Turning – Outer Critics Circle John Gassner Playwriting Award
- 2019: Tow Playwright in Residence, Playwrights Horizons
- 2017: The Mongoose – Stage Raw Award
- 2016: Edes Foundation Prize
