= List of American films of 2017 =

This is a list of American films released in 2017.

== Box office ==
The highest-grossing American films released in 2017, by domestic box office gross revenue, are as follows:

Highest-grossing films of 2017
Rank	Title	Distributor	Domestic gross
1	Star Wars: The Last Jedi	Disney	$620,181,382
2	Beauty and the Beast	Disney	$504,014,165
3	Wonder Woman	Warner Bros.	$412,563,408
4	Jumanji: Welcome to the Jungle	Sony	$404,515,480
5	Guardians of the Galaxy Vol. 2	Disney	$389,813,101
6	Spider-Man: Homecoming	Sony	$334,201,140
7	It	Warner Bros.	$327,481,748
8	Thor: Ragnarok	Disney	$315,058,289
9	Despicable Me 3	Universal	$264,624,300
10	Justice League	Warner Bros.	$229,024,295

== January–March ==
Opening		Title	Production company	Cast and crew	Ref.
J A N U A R Y	6	Underworld: Blood Wars	Screen Gems / Lakeshore Entertainment / Sketch Films	Anna Foerster (director); Cory Goodman (screenplay); Kate Beckinsale, Theo James, Lara Pulver, James Faulkner, Charles Dance	
J A N U A R Y	6	Arsenal	Lionsgate Premiere / Emmett/Furla/Oasis Films	Steven C. Miller (director); Jason Mosberg (screenplay); Adrian Grenier, John Cusack, Nicolas Cage, Johnathon Schaech	
J A N U A R Y	6	Between Us	IFC Films / Nora Films	Rafael Palacio Illingworth (director/screenplay); Olivia Thirlby, Ben Feldman, Adam Goldberg, Analeigh Tipton, Scott Haze, Peter Bogdanovich, Lesley Ann Warren	
J A N U A R Y	13	Monster Trucks	Paramount Pictures / Paramount Animation / Nickelodeon Movies	Chris Wedge (director); Derek Connolly (screenplay); Lucas Till, Jane Levy, Barry Pepper, Thomas Lennon, Rob Lowe, Danny Glover, Amy Ryan, Holt McCallany, Frank Whaley	
J A N U A R Y	13	The Bye Bye Man	STX Entertainment / Intrepid Pictures	Stacy Title (director); Jonathan Penner (screenplay); Douglas Smith, Michael Trucco, Lucien Laviscount, Cressida Bonas, Doug Jones, Carrie-Anne Moss, Faye Dunaway, Jenna Kanell	
J A N U A R Y	13	Sleepless	Open Road Films / FilmNation Entertainment	Baran bo Odar (director); Andrea Berloff (screenplay); Jamie Foxx, Michelle Monaghan, Dermot Mulroney, David Harbour, T.I., Gabrielle Union, Scoot McNairy	
J A N U A R Y	13	The Book of Love	Electric Entertainment	Bill Purple (director/screenplay); Robbie Pickering (screenplay); Jason Sudeikis, Jessica Biel, Maisie Williams, Mary Steenburgen, Orlando Jones, Paul Reiser	
J A N U A R Y	20	Split	Universal Pictures / Blumhouse Productions	M. Night Shyamalan (director/screenplay); James McAvoy, Anya Taylor-Joy, Betty Buckley	
J A N U A R Y	20	XXX: Return of Xander Cage	Paramount Pictures / Revolution Studios / One Race Films / Roth/Kirschenbaum Films	D. J. Caruso (director); F. Scott Frazier (screenplay); Vin Diesel, Donnie Yen, Deepika Padukone, Kris Wu, Ruby Rose, Tony Jaa, Nina Dobrev, Toni Collette, Samuel L. Jackson	
J A N U A R Y	20	The Resurrection of Gavin Stone	BH Tilt / WWE Studios / Walden Media	Dallas Jenkins (director); Andrea Gyertson Nasfell (screenplay); Brett Dalton, Anjelah Johnson, Neil Flynn, Shawn Michaels, D. B. Sweeney	
J A N U A R Y	20	Trespass Against Us	A24	Adam Smith (director); Alastair Siddons (screenplay); Michael Fassbender, Brendan Gleeson, Lyndsey Marshal, Killian Scott, Rory Kinnear, Sean Harris	
J A N U A R Y	25	Sophie and the Rising Sun	Monterey Media	Maggie Greenwald (director/screenplay); Julianne Nicholson, Takashi Yamaguchi, Margo Martindale, Diane Ladd, Lorraine Toussaint, Karen Wheeling Reynolds	
J A N U A R Y	27	A Dog's Purpose	Universal Pictures / Amblin Entertainment / Reliance Entertainment / Walden Media	Lasse Hallström (director); W. Bruce Cameron, Cathryn Michon, Audrey Wells, Maya Forbes, Wallace Wolodarsky (screenplay); Britt Robertson, KJ Apa, John Ortiz, Dennis Quaid, Josh Gad	
J A N U A R Y	27	Resident Evil: The Final Chapter	Screen Gems / Impact Pictures / Davis Films / Constantin Film	Paul W. S. Anderson (director/screenplay); Milla Jovovich, Iain Glen, Ali Larter, Shawn Roberts, Eoin Macken, Ruby Rose, William Levy	
J A N U A R Y	27	Lost in Florence	Orion Pictures	Evan Oppenheimer (director/screenplay); Brett Dalton, Alessandra Mastronardi, Alessandro Preziosi, Stana Katic	
J A N U A R Y	27	I Am Michael	Brainstorm Media	Justin Kelly (director/screenplay); Stacey Miller (screenplay); James Franco, Zachary Quinto, Emma Roberts, Charlie Carver	
J A N U A R Y	27	iBoy	Netflix	Adam Randall (director), Joe Barton (screenplay); Bill Milner, Maisie Williams, Jordan Bolger, Charley Palmer Rothwell, Aymen Hamdouchi, Miranda Richardson, Rory Kinnear	
F E B R U A R Y	3	Rings	Paramount Pictures	F. Javier Gutiérrez (director); David Loucka, Jacob Aaron Estes, Akiva Goldsman (screenplay); Matilda Lutz, Alex Roe, Johnny Galecki, Aimee Teegarden, Bonnie Morgan, Vincent D'Onofrio	
F E B R U A R Y	3	The Space Between Us	STX Entertainment / Huayi Brothers Media	Peter Chelsom (director); Allan Loeb (screenplay); Gary Oldman, Asa Butterfield, Carla Gugino, Britt Robertson, BD Wong, Janet Montgomery	
F E B R U A R Y	3	Youth in Oregon	Orion Pictures / Samuel Goldwyn Films	Joel David Moore (director); Andrew Eisen (screenplay); Frank Langella, Billy Crudup, Christina Applegate, Nicola Peltz, Mary Kay Place, Josh Lucas	
F E B R U A R Y	3	I Am Not Your Negro	Magnolia Pictures / Amazon Studios	Raoul Peck (director/screenplay); James Baldwin (screenplay); Samuel L. Jackson (narrator)	
F E B R U A R Y	3	Growing Up Smith	Good Deed Entertainment	Frank Lotito (director); Anjul Nigam, Paul Quinn, Gregory Scott Houghton (screenplay); Jason Lee, Anjul Nigam, Brighton Sharbino, Hilarie Burton, Roni Akurati	
F E B R U A R Y	10	The Lego Batman Movie	Warner Bros. Pictures / Warner Animation Group / DC Entertainment / RatPac-Dune Entertainment / Vertigo Entertainment / Lin Pictures / Lord Miller Productions	Chris McKay (director); Seth Grahame-Smith, Chris McKenna, Erik Sommers, Jared Stern, John Whittington (screenplay); Will Arnett, Zach Galifianakis, Michael Cera, Rosario Dawson, Ralph Fiennes	
F E B R U A R Y	10	John Wick: Chapter 2	Summit Entertainment / Thunder Road Pictures / 87Eleven Productions	Chad Stahelski (director); Derek Kolstad (screenplay); Keanu Reeves, Common, Laurence Fishburne, Riccardo Scamarcio, Ruby Rose, Lance Reddick, Peter Stormare, Bridget Moynahan, Franco Nero, John Leguizamo, Ian McShane	
F E B R U A R Y	10	Fifty Shades Darker	Universal Pictures / Perfect World Pictures	James Foley (director); Niall Leonard (screenplay); Dakota Johnson, Jamie Dornan, Eric Johnson, Rita Ora, Luke Grimes, Victor Rasuk, Kim Basinger, Marcia Gay Harden	
F E B R U A R Y	10	Bornless Ones	Uncork'd Entertainment	Alexander Babaev (director/screenplay); Margaret Judson, Devin Goodsell, Michael Johnston, Mark Furze	
F E B R U A R Y	17	The Great Wall	Universal Pictures / Legendary Pictures / Atlas Entertainment	Zhang Yimou (director); Carlo Bernard, Doug Miro, Tony Gilroy (screenplay); Matt Damon, Jing Tian, Pedro Pascal, Willem Dafoe, Andy Lau	
F E B R U A R Y	17	A Cure for Wellness	20th Century Fox / Regency Enterprises / Blind Wink Productions	Gore Verbinski (director); Justin Haythe (screenplay); Dane DeHaan, Jason Isaacs, Mia Goth, Harry Groener, Celia Imrie, Adrian Schiller	
F E B R U A R Y	17	Fist Fight	Warner Bros. Pictures / New Line Cinema / Village Roadshow Pictures / RatPac Entertainment / 21 Laps Entertainment	Richie Keen (director); Van Robichaux, Evan Susser (screenplay); Ice Cube, Charlie Day, Tracy Morgan, Jillian Bell, Dean Norris, Christina Hendricks, Dennis Haysbert	
F E B R U A R Y	17	American Fable	IFC Films	Anne Hamilton (director/screenplay); Peyton Kennedy, Richard Schiff, Kip Pardue, Marci Miller, Gavin MacIntosh, Zuleikha Robinson	
F E B R U A R Y	17	XX	Magnet Releasing	Jovanka Vuckovic, St. Vincent, Roxanne Benjamin, Karyn Kusama (directors/screenplay); Jack Ketchum (screenplay); Natalie Brown, Melanie Lynskey, Breeda Wool, Christina Kirk	
F E B R U A R Y	17	Lovesong	Strand Releasing	So Yong Kim (director/screenplay); Bradley Rust Gray (screenplay); Jena Malone, Riley Keough, Brooklyn Decker, Amy Seimetz, Marshall Chapman, Ryan Eggold, Rosanna Arquette	
F E B R U A R Y	24	Get Out	Universal Pictures	Jordan Peele (director/screenplay); Daniel Kaluuya, Allison Williams, Bradley Whitford, Caleb Landry Jones, Stephen Root, Catherine Keener	
F E B R U A R Y	24	Rock Dog	Summit Entertainment / Huayi Brothers	Ash Brannon (director/screenplay); Kurt Voelker (screenplay); Luke Wilson, J. K. Simmons, Eddie Izzard, Lewis Black, Kenan Thompson, Mae Whitman, Jorge Garcia, Matt Dillon, Sam Elliott	
F E B R U A R Y	24	Collide	Open Road Films	Eran Creevy (director/screenplay); F. Scott Frazier (screenplay); Nicholas Hoult, Felicity Jones, Marwan Kenzari, Ben Kingsley, Anthony Hopkins	
F E B R U A R Y	24	I Don't Feel at Home in This World Anymore	Netflix / XYZ Films	Macon Blair (director/screenplay); Melanie Lynskey, Elijah Wood, David Yow, Jane Levy, Devon Graye	
M A R C H	1	Contemporary Color	Oscilloscope Laboratories	Turner Ross, Bill Ross IV (directors); David Byrne	
M A R C H	3	Logan	20th Century Fox / Marvel Entertainment	James Mangold (director/screenplay); Scott Frank, Michael Green (screenplay); Hugh Jackman, Patrick Stewart, Richard E. Grant, Boyd Holbrook, Stephen Merchant, Dafne Keen	
M A R C H	3	The Shack	Summit Entertainment	Stuart Hazeldine (director); John Fusco, Andrew Lanham, Destin Daniel Cretton (screenplay); Sam Worthington, Octavia Spencer, Aviv Alush, Radha Mitchell, Alice Braga, Graham Greene, Tim McGraw, Sumire	
M A R C H	3	Before I Fall	Open Road Films	Ry Russo-Young (director); Maria Maggenti, Gina Prince-Bythewood (screenplay); Zoey Deutch, Halston Sage, Logan Miller, Kian Lawley, Elena Kampouris, Diego Boneta, Jennifer Beals	
M A R C H	3	Table 19	Fox Searchlight Pictures	Jeffrey Blitz (director/screenplay); Anna Kendrick, Craig Robinson, June Squibb, Lisa Kudrow, Stephen Merchant, Tony Revolori, Wyatt Russell, Amanda Crew	
M A R C H	3	The Last Word	Bleecker Street	Mark Pellington (director); Stuart Ross Fink (screenplay); Shirley MacLaine, Amanda Seyfried, AnnJewel Lee Dixon, Anne Heche, Tom Everett Scott, Thomas Sadoski, Joel Murray, Adina Porter	
M A R C H	3	Catfight	Dark Sky Films	Onur Tukel (director/screenplay); Sandra Oh, Anne Heche, Alicia Silverstone, Amy Hill, Tituss Burgess, Myra Lucretia Taylor, Ariel Kavoussi, Craig Bierko, Dylan Baker	
M A R C H	3	Donald Cried	The Orchard	Kristopher Avedisian (director/screenplay); Kristopher Avedisian, Jesse Wakeman, Louisa Krause, Ted Arcidi	
M A R C H	10	Kong: Skull Island	Warner Bros. Pictures / Legendary Pictures / Tencent Pictures	Jordan Vogt-Roberts (director); Dan Gilroy, Max Borenstein, Derek Connolly (screenplay); Tom Hiddleston, Samuel L. Jackson, John Goodman, Brie Larson, Jing Tian, Toby Kebbell, John Ortiz, Corey Hawkins, Jason Mitchell, Shea Whigham, Thomas Mann, Terry Notary, John C. Reilly	
M A R C H	10	Burning Sands	Netflix	Gerard McMurray (director/screenplay); Christine Berg (screenplay); Trevor Jackson, Alfre Woodard, Steve Harris, Tosin Cole, DeRon Horton, Christian Robinson, Trevante Rhodes, Jay Q Saun, Serayah	
M A R C H	17	Beauty and the Beast	Walt Disney Pictures / Mandeville Films	Bill Condon (director); Stephen Chbosky, Evan Spiliotopoulos (screenplay); Emma Watson, Dan Stevens, Luke Evans, Kevin Kline, Josh Gad, Ewan McGregor, Stanley Tucci, Audra McDonald, Gugu Mbatha-Raw, Ian McKellen, Emma Thompson	
M A R C H	17	The Belko Experiment	Orion Pictures / Metro-Goldwyn-Mayer	Greg McLean (director); James Gunn (screenplay); John Gallagher Jr., Tony Goldwyn, Adria Arjona, John C. McGinley, Melonie Diaz, Josh Brener, Michael Rooker	
M A R C H	17	Song to Song	Broad Green Pictures	Terrence Malick (director/screenplay); Michael Fassbender, Ryan Gosling, Rooney Mara, Natalie Portman	
M A R C H	17	Atomica	Syfy Films	Dagen Merrill (director); Kevin Burke, Fred Fernandez-Armesto, Adam Gyngell (screenplay); Dominic Monaghan, Tom Sizemore, Sarah Habel	
M A R C H	17	All Nighter	Good Deed Entertainment	Gavin Wiesen (director); Seth W. Owen (screenplay); J. K. Simmons, Emile Hirsch, Taran Killam, Kristen Schaal, Analeigh Lipton	
M A R C H	17	The Devil's Candy	IFC Midnight	Sean Byrne (director/screenplay); Ethan Embry, Shiri Appleby, Kiara Glasco, Pruitt Taylor Vince	
M A R C H	24	Power Rangers	Lionsgate / SCG Films / Temple Hill Entertainment	Dean Israelite (director); John Gatins (screenplay); Dacre Montgomery, Naomi Scott, RJ Cyler, Becky G, Ludi Lin, Bill Hader, Bryan Cranston, Elizabeth Banks	
M A R C H	24	Life	Columbia Pictures / Skydance Media	Daniel Espinosa (director); Rhett Reese, Paul Wernick (screenplay); Jake Gyllenhaal, Ryan Reynolds, Rebecca Ferguson, Hiroyuki Sanada, Ariyon Bakare, Olga Dihovichnaya	
M A R C H	24	CHiPs	Warner Bros. Pictures / RatPac Entertainment	Dax Shepard (director/screenplay); Dax Shepard, Michael Peña, Rosa Salazar, Adam Brody, Vincent D'Onofrio	
M A R C H	24	Wilson	Fox Searchlight Pictures	Craig Johnson (director); Daniel Clowes (screenplay); Woody Harrelson, Laura Dern, Isabella Amara, Judy Greer, Cheryl Hines	
M A R C H	28	The Marine 5: Battleground	WWE Studios / Sony Pictures Home Entertainment	James Nunn (director); Ed McHenry, Rory McHenry (screenplay); The Miz, Maryse Ouellet Mizanin, Curtis Axel, Heath Slater, Bo Dallas, Naomi	
M A R C H	31	Ghost in the Shell	Paramount Pictures / DreamWorks Pictures / Reliance Entertainment / Amblin Partners	Rupert Sanders (director); Jamie Moss, William Wheeler, Ehren Kruger (screenplay); Scarlett Johansson, Takeshi Kitano, Michael Pitt, Pilou Asbæk, Chin Han, Juliette Binoche	
M A R C H	31	The Boss Baby	20th Century Fox / DreamWorks Animation	Tom McGrath (director); Michael McCullers (screenplay); Alec Baldwin, Steve Buscemi, Jimmy Kimmel, Lisa Kudrow, Miles Bakshi, Tobey Maguire	
M A R C H	31	The Zookeeper's Wife	Focus Features	Niki Caro (director); Angela Workman (screenplay); Jessica Chastain, Johan Heldenbergh, Daniel Brühl, Michael McElhatton	
M A R C H	31	The Blackcoat's Daughter	A24	Oz Perkins (director/screenplay); Emma Roberts, Kiernan Shipka, Lucy Boynton, Lauren Holly, James Remar	
M A R C H	31	The Discovery	Netflix	Charlie McDowell (director/screenplay); Justin Lader (screenplay); Jason Segel, Rooney Mara, Jesse Plemons, Riley Keough, Robert Redford	
M A R C H	31	Carrie Pilby	The Orchard	Susan Johnson (director); Kara Holden, Dean Craig (screenplay); Bel Powley, Vanessa Bayer, Colin O'Donoghue, William Moseley, Jason Ritter, Gabriel Byrne, Nathan Lane	

== April–June ==
Opening		Title	Production company	Cast and crew	Ref.
A P R I L	7	The Case for Christ	Pure Flix Entertainment	Jon Gunn (director); Brian Bird (screenplay); Mike Vogel, Erika Christensen, Frankie Faison, Faye Dunaway, Robert Forster	
A P R I L	7	Smurfs: The Lost Village	Columbia Pictures / Sony Pictures Animation / The Kerner Entertainment Company	Kelly Asbury (director); Stacey Harman, Pamela Ribon (screenplay); Demi Lovato, Rainn Wilson, Joe Manganiello, Jack McBrayer, Danny Pudi, Michelle Rodriguez, Ellie Kemper, Ariel Winter, Mandy Patinkin, Julia Roberts	
A P R I L	7	Going in Style	Warner Bros. Pictures / New Line Cinema / Village Roadshow Pictures / RatPac Entertainment	Zach Braff (director); Theodore Melfi (screenplay); Morgan Freeman, Michael Caine, Alan Arkin, Ann-Margret, Joey King, Matt Dillon, Christopher Lloyd	
A P R I L	7	Colossal	Neon	Nacho Vigalondo (director/screenplay); Anne Hathaway, Jason Sudeikis, Dan Stevens, Austin Stowell, Tim Blake Nelson	
A P R I L	7	Gifted	Fox Searchlight Pictures	Marc Webb (director); Tom Flynn (screenplay); Chris Evans, Mckenna Grace, Lindsay Duncan, Jenny Slate, Octavia Spencer	
A P R I L	7	Aftermath	Lionsgate Premiere / Emmett/Furla/Oasis Films	Elliott Lester (director); Javier Gullón (screenplay); Arnold Schwarzenegger, Scoot McNairy, Maggie Grace, Martin Donovan	
A P R I L	14	The Fate of the Furious	Universal Pictures / Original Film / One Race Films	F. Gary Gray (director); Chris Morgan (screenplay); Vin Diesel, Dwayne Johnson, Jason Statham, Michelle Rodriguez, Tyrese Gibson, Ludacris, Kurt Russell, Charlize Theron	
A P R I L	14	Spark: A Space Tail	Open Road Films / ToonBox Entertainment	Aaron Woodley (director/screenplay); Doug Hadders, Adam Rotstein (screenplay); Jace Norman, Jessica Biel, Susan Sarandon, Patrick Stewart, Hilary Swank	
A P R I L	14	The Lost City of Z	Plan B Entertainment	James Gray (director/screenplay); Charlie Hunnam, Robert Pattinson, Sienna Miller, Tom Holland, Angus Macfadyen, Ian McDiarmid, Franco Nero	
A P R I L	14	My Entire High School Sinking into the Sea	GKIDS	Dash Shaw (director/screenplay); Jason Schwartzman, Reggie Watts, Maya Rudolph, Lena Dunham, Susan Sarandon, Thomas Jay Ryan, Alex Karpovsky, John Cameron Mitchell	
A P R I L	14	The Outcasts	Swen Group	Peter Hutchings (director); Dominique Ferrari, Suzanne Wrubel (screenplay); Victoria Justice, Eden Sher, Ashley Rickards, Claudia Lee, Katie Chang, Peyton List, Jazmyn C. Richardson, Avan Jogia	
A P R I L	21	Born in China	Disneynature	Lu Chuan (director/screenplay); David Fowler, Brian Leith, Phil Chapman (screenplay); John Krasinski (narrator)	
A P R I L	21	Unforgettable	Warner Bros. Pictures / RatPac Entertainment	Denise Di Novi (director); Christina Hodson (screenplay); Katherine Heigl, Rosario Dawson, Geoff Stults	
A P R I L	21	The Promise	Open Road Films	Terry George (director/screenplay); Robin Swicord (screenplay); Oscar Isaac, Charlotte Le Bon, Christian Bale, Daniel Giménez Cacho, Shohreh Aghdashloo, Marwan Kenzari, Angela Sarafyan, James Cromwell	
A P R I L	22	The Immortal Life of Henrietta Lacks	HBO Films / Your Face Goes Here Entertainment / Cine Mosaic / Harpo Films	George C. Wolfe (director/screenplay); Peter Landesman, Alexander Woo (screenplay); Oprah Winfrey, Rose Byrne, Renée Elise Goldsberry, Courtney B. Vance, Ellen Barkin, Reg E. Cathey, Ruben Santiago-Hudson, Leslie Uggams, Reed Birney, John Douglas Thompson, Adriane Lenox, Roger Robinson, Rocky Carroll, Kyanna Simone Simpson, John Beasley, Tinashe Kajese, John Benjamin Hickey, Michael Gaston, Peter Gerety, Mary Shaw, Lisa Arrindell, Gabriel Ebert	
A P R I L	25	After the Reality	The Orchard	David Anderson (director/screenplay); Matthew Morrison, Sarah Chalke	
A P R I L	28	The Circle	STX Entertainment / EuropaCorp / Image Nation	James Ponsoldt (director/screenplay); Dave Eggers (screenplay); Emma Watson, Tom Hanks, John Boyega, Karen Gillan, Ellar Coltrane, Patton Oswalt, Glenne Headly, Bill Paxton	
A P R I L	28	How to Be a Latin Lover	Pantelion Films	Ken Marino (director); Chris Spain, Jon Zack (screenplay); Eugenio Derbez, Salma Hayek, Raphael Alejandro, Raquel Welch, Linda Lavin, Renée Taylor, Rob Corddry, Rob Riggle, Kristen Bell, Rob Lowe	
A P R I L	28	Sleight	BH Tilt / WWE Studios	J. D. Dillard (director/screenplay); Alex Theurer (screenplay); Jacob Latimore, Seychelle Gabriel, Sasheer Zamata, Storm Reid, Cameron Esposito, Dulé Hill	
A P R I L	28	Voice from the Stone	Momentum Pictures	Eric Dennis Howell (director); Andrew Shaw (screenplay); Emilia Clarke, Marton Csokas, Edward George Dring	
M A Y	5	Becoming Bond	Hulu / Delirio Films	Josh Greenbaum (director/screenplay); George Lazenby, Josh Lawson, Kassandra Clementi, Landon Ashworth, Jane Seymour, Jeff Garlin, Jake Johnson, Dana Carvey	
M A Y	5	Guardians of the Galaxy Vol. 2	Marvel Studios	James Gunn (director/screenplay); Chris Pratt, Zoe Saldaña, Dave Bautista, Vin Diesel, Bradley Cooper, Michael Rooker, Karen Gillan, Pom Klementieff, Sylvester Stallone, Kurt Russell	
M A Y	5	The Lovers	A24	Azazel Jacobs (director/screenplay); Debra Winger, Tracy Letts, Aidan Gillen, Melora Walters, Tyler Ross, Jessica Sula	
M A Y	5	3 Generations	The Weinstein Company	Gaby Dellal (director/screenplay); Nikole Beckwith (screenplay); Naomi Watts, Elle Fanning, Susan Sarandon, Tate Donovan, Linda Emond, Sam Trammell	
M A Y	12	King Arthur: Legend of the Sword	Warner Bros. Pictures / Village Roadshow Pictures / RatPac Entertainment / Weed Road Pictures	Guy Ritchie (director/screenplay); Joby Harold, Lionel Wigram (screenplay); Charlie Hunnam, Àstrid Bergès-Frisbey, Djimon Hounsou, Aidan Gillen, Jude Law, Eric Bana	
M A Y	12	Snatched	20th Century Fox / Chernin Entertainment	Jonathan Levine (director); Katie Dippold (screenplay); Amy Schumer, Goldie Hawn, Joan Cusack, Ike Barinholtz, Wanda Sykes, Christopher Meloni	
M A Y	12	Lowriders	BH Tilt / Imagine Entertainment	Ricardo de Montreuil (director); Elgin James, Cheo Hodari Coker (screenplay); Demián Bichir, Gabriel Chavarria, Theo Rossi, Melissa Benoist, Tony Revolori, Eva Longoria	
M A Y	12	The Wall	Roadside Attractions	Doug Liman (director); Dwain Worrell (screenplay); Aaron Taylor-Johnson, John Cena	
M A Y	12	Paris Can Wait	Sony Pictures Classics	Eleanor Coppola (director/screenplay); Diane Lane, Arnaud Viard, Alec Baldwin	
M A Y	19	Alien: Covenant	20th Century Fox / Scott Free Productions	Ridley Scott (director); John Logan, Dante Harper (screenplay); Michael Fassbender, Katherine Waterston, Billy Crudup, Danny McBride, Demián Bichir	
M A Y	19	Diary of a Wimpy Kid: The Long Haul	20th Century Fox / Color Force	David Bowers (director/screenplay); Jeff Kinney (screenplay); Jason Drucker, Alicia Silverstone, Tom Everett Scott, Charlie Wright, Owen Asztalos	
M A Y	19	Everything, Everything	Warner Bros. Pictures / Metro-Goldwyn-Mayer	Stella Meghie (director); J. Mills Goodloe (screenplay); Amandla Stenberg, Nick Robinson, Ana de la Reguera, Anika Noni Rose	
M A Y	19	Wakefield	IFC Films	Robin Swicord (director/screenplay); Bryan Cranston, Jennifer Garner, Beverly D'Angelo, Jason O'Mara, Pippa Bennett-Warner	
M A Y	20	The Wizard of Lies	HBO Films	Barry Levinson (director); Sam Levinson, Sam Baum, John Burnham Schwartz (screenplay); Robert De Niro, Michelle Pfeiffer, Alessandro Nivola, Hank Azaria, Lily Rabe, Kristen Connolly, Kathrine Narducci, Michael Kostroff, Nathan Darrow, Diana B. Henriques, Kelly AuCoin, Amanda Warren, Mark LaMura, Michael Goorjian, Sophie von Haselberg, Barbara Linton, Deborah Ayorinde, Geoffrey Cantor, Vince Giordano, Lisa Kron, Marion McCorry, Joy Behar, Wolf Blitzer, Tom Brokaw, George W. Bush, Stephen Colbert, Anderson Cooper, Judy Garland, David Letterman, Bill Maher, Harry Markopolos, Doris McCarthy, Morley Safer, Brian Williams, Sydney Gayle, Steve Coulter, Shivam Chopra, Clem Cheung, Ben Hammer, Matt Fischel	
M A Y	25	Baywatch	Paramount Pictures / Uncharted / The Montecito Picture Company	Seth Gordon (director) Damian Shannon, Mark Swift (screenplay); Dwayne Johnson, Zac Efron, Alexandra Daddario, David Hasselhoff	
M A Y	26	Pirates of the Caribbean: Dead Men Tell No Tales	Walt Disney Pictures / Jerry Bruckheimer Films	Joachim Rønning, Espen Sandberg (directors); Jeff Nathanson (screenplay); Johnny Depp, Javier Bardem, Geoffrey Rush, Brenton Thwaites, Kaya Scodelario, Kevin McNally	
M A Y	26	Buena Vista Social Club: Adios	Broad Green Pictures	Lucy Walker (director); Omara Portuondo, Jesus "Aguaje" Ramos, Manuel "Guajiro" Mirabal, Barbarito Torres, Guajirito Mirabal, Eliades Ochoa	
M A Y	26	War Machine	Netflix / Plan B Entertainment	David Michôd (director/screenplay); Brad Pitt, Anthony Michael Hall, Anthony Hayes, Topher Grace, Will Poulter, Tilda Swinton, Ben Kingsley	
J U N E	2	Wonder Woman	Warner Bros. Pictures / RatPac Entertainment / DC Entertainment / Atlas Entertainment / Cruel and Unusual Films	Patty Jenkins (director); Allan Heinberg (screenplay); Gal Gadot, Chris Pine, Robin Wright, Danny Huston, David Thewlis, Connie Nielsen, Elena Anaya	
J U N E	2	Captain Underpants: The First Epic Movie	20th Century Fox / DreamWorks Animation	David Soren (director); Nicholas Stoller (screenplay); Kevin Hart, Ed Helms, Thomas Middleditch, Nick Kroll	
J U N E	2	Dean	Lionsgate / CBS Films	Demetri Martin (director/screenplay); Demetri Martin, Kevin Kline, Gillian Jacobs, Rory Scovel, Christine Woods, Ginger Gonzaga, Peter Scolari, Briga Heelan, Reid Scott, Mary Steenburgen	
J U N E	9	The Mummy	Universal Pictures / K/O Paper Products	Alex Kurtzman (director); David Koepp, Christopher McQuarrie, Dylan Kussman (screenplay); Tom Cruise, Annabelle Wallis, Sofia Boutella, Jake Johnson, Courtney B. Vance, Marwan Kenzari, Russell Crowe	
J U N E	9	It Comes at Night	A24	Trey Edward Shults (director/screenplay); Joel Edgerton, Christopher Abbott, Carmen Ejogo, Riley Keough, Kelvin Harrison Jr.	
J U N E	9	My Cousin Rachel	Fox Searchlight Pictures	Roger Michell (director/screenplay); Rachel Weisz, Sam Claflin, Iain Glen, Holliday Grainger	
J U N E	9	Megan Leavey	Bleecker Street	Gabriela Cowperthwaite (director); Pamela Gray, Annie Mumolo, Tim Lovestedt (screenplay); Kate Mara, Ramón Rodríguez, Tom Felton, Bradley Whitford, Will Patton, Sam Keeley, Common, Edie Falco	
J U N E	9	Beatriz at Dinner	Roadside Attractions	Miguel Arteta (director); Mike White (screenplay); Salma Hayek, John Lithgow, Connie Britton, Jay Duplass, Amy Landecker, Chloë Sevigny, David Warshofsky	
J U N E	16	Cars 3	Walt Disney Pictures / Pixar Animation Studios	Brian Fee (director); Kiel Murray, Bob Peterson, Mike Rich (screenplay); Owen Wilson, Cristela Alonzo, Chris Cooper, Armie Hammer, Larry the Cable Guy, Bonnie Hunt, Nathan Fillion, Lea DeLaria, Kerry Washington	
J U N E	16	Rough Night	Columbia Pictures	Lucia Aniello (director/screenplay); Paul W. Downs (screenplay); Scarlett Johansson, Kate McKinnon, Jillian Bell, Ilana Glazer, Zoë Kravitz, Paul W. Downs	
J U N E	16	All Eyez on Me	Summit Entertainment / Morgan Creek Productions / Codeblack Films	Benny Boom (director); Jeremy Haft, Eddie Gonzalez, Steven Bagatourian (screenplay); Demetrius Shipp Jr., Kat Graham, Lauren Cohan, Hill Harper, Danai Gurira	
J U N E	16	47 Meters Down	Entertainment Studios	Johannes Roberts (director/screenplay); Ernest Riera (screenplay); Claire Holt, Mandy Moore	
J U N E	16	The Book of Henry	Focus Features / Sidney Kimmel Entertainment	Colin Trevorrow (director); Gregg Hurwitz (screenplay); Naomi Watts, Jaeden Lieberher, Jacob Tremblay, Sarah Silverman, Lee Pace, Maddie Ziegler, Tonya Pinkins, Dean Norris	
J U N E	16	Once Upon a Time in Venice	RLJ Entertainment	Mark Cullen (director/screenplay); Robb Cullen (screenplay); Bruce Willis, Jason Momoa, John Goodman, Thomas Middleditch, Famke Janssen, Adam Goldberg, Jessica Gomes	
J U N E	21	Transformers: The Last Knight	Paramount Pictures	Michael Bay (director); Art Marcum, Matt Holloway, Ken Nolan (screenplay); Mark Wahlberg, Josh Duhamel, Stanley Tucci, Anthony Hopkins	
J U N E	23	The Beguiled	Focus Features	Sofia Coppola (director/screenplay); Colin Farrell, Nicole Kidman, Kirsten Dunst, Elle Fanning	
J U N E	23	The Big Sick	Amazon Studios / Lionsgate	Michael Showalter (director); Emily V. Gordon, Kumail Nanjiani (screenplay); Kumail Nanjiani, Zoe Kazan, Holly Hunter, Ray Romano, Anupam Kher	
J U N E	23	The Bad Batch	Neon	Ana Lily Amirpour (director/screenplay); Suki Waterhouse, Jason Momoa, Giovanni Ribisi, Keanu Reeves	
J U N E	28	Baby Driver	TriStar Pictures / Media Rights Capital / Working Title Films	Edgar Wright (director/screenplay); Ansel Elgort, Kevin Spacey, Lily James, Eiza González, Jon Hamm, Jamie Foxx, Jon Bernthal	
J U N E	28	Okja	Netflix / Plan B Entertainment	Bong Joon-ho (director/screenplay); Jon Ronson (screenplay); Tilda Swinton, Paul Dano, Ahn Seo-hyun, Byun Hee-bong, Steven Yeun, Lily Collins, Yoon Je-moon, Shirley Henderson, Daniel Henshall, Devon Bostick, Choi Woo-shik, Giancarlo Esposito, Jake Gyllenhaal	
J U N E	30	Despicable Me 3	Universal Pictures / Illumination	Pierre Coffin, Kyle Balda (directors); Cinco Paul, Ken Daurio (screenplay); Steve Carell, Kristen Wiig, Trey Parker, Miranda Cosgrove, Steve Coogan, Jenny Slate, Dana Gaier, Julie Andrews	
J U N E	30	The House	Warner Bros. Pictures / New Line Cinema / Village Roadshow Pictures / Gary Sanchez Productions / Good Universe	Andrew J. Cohen (director/screenplay); Brendan O'Brien (screenplay); Will Ferrell, Amy Poehler, Jason Mantzoukas, Nick Kroll, Jeremy Renner	
J U N E	30	The Little Hours	Gunpowder & Sky	Jeff Baena (director/screenplay); Alison Brie, Dave Franco, Kate Micucci, Aubrey Plaza, John C. Reilly, Molly Shannon	
J U N E	30	Inconceivable	Lionsgate Premiere / Emmett/Furla/Oasis Films	Jonathan Baker (director); Chloe King (screenplay); Gina Gershon, Faye Dunaway, Nicolas Cage, Nicky Whelan	
J U N E	30	2:22	Magnet Releasing	Paul Currie (director); Nathan Parker, Todd Stein (screenplay); Michiel Huisman, Teresa Palmer, Sam Reid	

== July–September ==
Opening		Title	Production company	Cast and crew	Ref.
J U L Y	7	A Ghost Story	A24	David Lowery (director/screenplay); Casey Affleck, Rooney Mara, Will Oldham, Liz Cardenas Franke, Sonia Acevedo, Rob Zabrecky	
J U L Y	7	Spider-Man: Homecoming	Columbia Pictures / Marvel Studios	Jon Watts (director/screenplay); Jonathan Goldstein, John Francis Daley, Christopher Ford, Chris McKenna, Erik Sommers (screenplay); Tom Holland, Michael Keaton, Jon Favreau, Gwyneth Paltrow, Zendaya, Donald Glover, Jacob Batalon, Laura Harrier, Tony Revolori, Bokeem Woodbine, Tyne Daly, Marisa Tomei, Robert Downey Jr.	
J U L Y	8	Tour de Pharmacy	HBO Films	Jake Szymanski (director); Murray Miller (screenplay); Andy Samberg, Orlando Bloom, Freddie Highmore, Daveed Diggs, John Cena, James Marsden, Will Forte, Maya Rudolph, Jeff Goldblum, Julia Ormond, Danny Glover, Dolph Lundgren, Kevin Bacon, Phylicia Rashad, Adewale Akinnuoye-Agbaje, Nathan Fielder, Chris "Romanski" Romano, Eric Nenninger, Eugenia Kuzmina, Liane Balaban, Seth Morris, Rebecca Dayan, Andy Milder, Kevin Clash, Jon Hamm, Edgar Wright, J.J. Abrams, Lance Armstrong, Mike Tyson, Joe Buck, Chris Webber	
J U L Y	14	War for the Planet of the Apes	20th Century Fox / Chernin Entertainment	Matt Reeves (director/screenplay); Mark Bomback (screenplay); Andy Serkis, Woody Harrelson, Steve Zahn	
J U L Y	14	Wish Upon	Broad Green Pictures / Orion Pictures	John Leonetti (director); Barbara Marshall (screenplay); Joey King, Ki Hong Lee, Sydney Park, Elisabeth Röhm, Ryan Phillippe	
J U L Y	21	Dunkirk	Warner Bros. Pictures / Syncopy Inc. / RatPac Entertainment	Christopher Nolan (director/screenplay); Fionn Whitehead, Tom Glynn-Carney, Jack Lowden, Harry Styles, Aneurin Barnard, James D'Arcy, Barry Keoghan, Kenneth Branagh, Cillian Murphy, Mark Rylance, Tom Hardy	
J U L Y	21	Girls Trip	Universal Pictures / Perfect World Pictures / Will Packer Productions	Malcolm D. Lee (director); Kenya Barris, Tracy Oliver (screenplay); Regina Hall, Tiffany Haddish, Larenz Tate, Mike Colter, Kate Walsh, Jada Pinkett Smith, Queen Latifah	
J U L Y	21	First Kill	Lionsgate Premiere / Emmett/Furla/Oasis Films	Steven C. Miller (director); Nick Gordon (screenplay); Hayden Christensen, Bruce Willis, Gethin Anthony, Megan Leonard, Tyler Jon Olson, Shea Buckner, William DeMeo	
J U L Y	28	Atomic Blonde	Focus Features	David Leitch (director); Kurt Johnstad (screenplay); Charlize Theron, James McAvoy, John Goodman, Til Schweiger, Eddie Marsan, Sofia Boutella, Toby Jones	
J U L Y	28	The Emoji Movie	Columbia Pictures / Sony Pictures Animation	Tony Leondis (director/screenplay); Eric Siegel, Mike White (screenplay); T.J. Miller, James Corden, Anna Faris, Maya Rudolph, Steven Wright, Jennifer Coolidge, Jake T. Austin, Christina Aguilera, Sofía Vergara, Patrick Stewart	
J U L Y	28	An Inconvenient Sequel: Truth to Power	Paramount Pictures / Participant Media	Bonni Cohen, Jon Shenk (directors); Al Gore (screenplay); Al Gore	
J U L Y	28	Detroit	Annapurna Pictures	Kathryn Bigelow (director); Mark Boal (screenplay); John Boyega, Will Poulter, Algee Smith, Jason Mitchell, John Krasinski, Anthony Mackie	
J U L Y	28	Brigsby Bear	Sony Pictures Classics	Dave McCary (director); Kyle Mooney, Kevin Costello (screenplay); Kyle Mooney, Claire Danes, Mark Hamill, Greg Kinnear, Andy Samberg, Matt Walsh, Michaela Watkins	
J U L Y	28	Menashe	A24	Joshua Z Weinstein (director/screenplay); Alex Lipschultz, Musa Syeed (screenplay); Menashe Lustig, Ruben Niborski, Yoel Weisshaus, Meyer Schwartz	
A U G U S T	4	The Dark Tower	Columbia Pictures / Media Rights Capital / Imagine Entertainment / Weed Road Pictures	Nikolaj Arcel (director/screenplay); Akiva Goldsman, Jeff Pinkner, Anders Thomas Jensen (screenplay); Idris Elba, Matthew McConaughey, Tom Taylor, Fran Kranz, Abbey Lee, Jackie Earle Haley	
A U G U S T	4	Kidnap	Aviron Pictures	Luis Prieto (director); Knate Lee (screenplay); Halle Berry, Sage Correa, Chris McGinn, Lew Temple	
A U G U S T	4	Step	Fox Searchlight Pictures	Amanda Lipitz (director); Blessin Giraldo, Cori Grainger, Tayla Solomon, Gari McIntyre, Paula Dofat	
A U G U S T	4	Wind River	The Weinstein Company	Taylor Sheridan (director/screenplay); Jeremy Renner, Elizabeth Olsen	
A U G U S T	4	Armed Response	Saban Films / WWE Films	John Stockwell (director); Matt Savelloni (screenplay); Wesley Snipes, Anne Heche, Dave Annable, Seth Rollins, Gene Simmons, Mo Gallini	
A U G U S T	11	Annabelle: Creation	Warner Bros. Pictures / New Line Cinema / RatPac Entertainment / Atomic Monster	David F. Sandberg (director); Gary Dauberman (screenplay); Stephanie Sigman, Talitha Bateman, Lulu Wilson, Anthony LaPaglia, Miranda Otto	
A U G U S T	11	The Glass Castle	Lionsgate	Destin Daniel Cretton (director/screenplay); Andrew Lanham, Marti Noxon (screenplay); Brie Larson, Woody Harrelson, Max Greenfield, Sarah Snook, Naomi Watts	
A U G U S T	11	The Nut Job 2: Nutty by Nature	Open Road Films / ToonBox Entertainment	Cal Brunker (director/screenplay); Scott Bindley, Bob Barlen (screenplay); Will Arnett, Maya Rudolph, Jackie Chan, Katherine Heigl, Bobby Moynihan, Bobby Cannavale, Isabela Merced, Jeff Dunham, Gabriel Iglesias	
A U G U S T	11	Good Time	A24	Safdie brothers (directors); Ronald Bronstein, Josh Safdie (screenplay); Robert Pattinson, Benny Safdie, Buddy Duress, Taliah Lennice Webster, Jennifer Jason Leigh, Barkhad Abdi	
A U G U S T	11	Ingrid Goes West	Neon	Matt Spicer (director/screenplay); David Branson Smith (screenplay); Aubrey Plaza, Elizabeth Olsen, Billy Magnussen, Wyatt Russell, Pom Klementieff, O'Shea Jackson Jr.	
A U G U S T	11	The Only Living Boy in New York	Amazon Studios / Roadside Attractions	Marc Webb (director); Allan Loeb (screenplay); Callum Turner, Kate Beckinsale, Pierce Brosnan, Cynthia Nixon, Jeff Bridges	
A U G U S T	18	The Hitman's Bodyguard	Summit Entertainment / Millennium Media	Patrick Hughes (director); Tom O'Connor (screenplay); Ryan Reynolds, Samuel L. Jackson, Gary Oldman, Salma Hayek, Élodie Yung, Joaquim de Almeida, Kirsty Mitchell, Richard E. Grant	
A U G U S T	18	Logan Lucky	Bleecker Street / FilmNation Entertainment	Steven Soderbergh (director); Rebecca Blunt (screenplay); Channing Tatum, Adam Driver, Seth MacFarlane, Riley Keough, Katie Holmes, Katherine Waterston, Dwight Yoakam, Sebastian Stan, Brian Gleeson, Jack Quaid, Hilary Swank, Daniel Craig	
A U G U S T	18	Patti Cake$	Fox Searchlight Pictures	Geremy Jasper (director/screenplay); Danielle Macdonald, Bridget Everett, Mamoudou Athie, Cathy Moriarty, McCaul Lombardi	
A U G U S T	22	Victor Crowley	Dark Sky Films / ArieScope Pictures	Adam Green (director/screenplay); Parry Shen, Laura Ortiz, Dave Sheridan, Krystal Joy Brown, Felissa Rose, Kane Hodder	
A U G U S T	25	All Saints	Affirm Films / Provident Films	Steve Gomer (director); Steve Armour (screenplay); John Corbett, Cara Buono, Myles Moore, Nelson Lee, Barry Corbin, David Keith, Angela Fox, Chonda Pierce, Gregory Alan Williams	
A U G U S T	25	Served Like a Girl	Entertainment Studios	Lysa Heslov (director/screenplay); Tchavdar Georgiev (screenplay)	
A U G U S T	25	Beach Rats	Neon	Eliza Hittman (director/screenplay); Harris Dickinson, Madeline Weinstein, Kate Hodge	
A U G U S T	25	Birth of the Dragon	OTL Releasing / BH Tilt / WWE Studios	George Nolfi (director); Christopher Wilkinson, Stephen J. Rivele (screenplay); Philip Wan-lung Ng, Xia Yu, Jin Xing, Qu Jingjing, Ron Yuan, Billy Magnussen	
S E P T E M B E R	1	Film Stars Don't Die in Liverpool	Sony Pictures Classics	Paul McGuigan (director); Matt Greenhalgh (screenplay); Annette Bening, Jamie Bell, Vanessa Redgrave, Julie Walters, Kenneth Cranham, Stephen Graham, Frances Barber, Leanne Best	
S E P T E M B E R	1	Tulip Fever	The Weinstein Company	Justin Chadwick (director); Deborah Moggach, Tom Stoppard (screenplay); Alicia Vikander, Dane DeHaan, Jack O'Connell, Holliday Grainger, Tom Hollander, Matthew Morrison, Kevin McKidd, Douglas Hodge, Joanna Scanlan, Zach Galifianakis, Judi Dench, Christoph Waltz	
S E P T E M B E R	1	Unlocked	Lionsgate Premiere	Michael Apted (director); Peter O'Brien (screenplay); Noomi Rapace, Orlando Bloom, Toni Collette, John Malkovich, Michael Douglas	
S E P T E M B E R	1	Valley of Bones	Smith Global Media / Bad Medicine Films	Dan Glaser (director/screenplay); Steven Molony, Richard M. Lewis (screenplay); Jon L. Wanzek (story by); Autumn Reeser, Rhys Coiro, Steven Molony, Alexandra Billings, Bill Smitrovich, Mark Margolis	
S E P T E M B E R	8	It	Warner Bros. Pictures / New Line Cinema / RatPac Entertainment / Vertigo Entertainment / Lin Pictures	Andy Muschietti (director); Chase Palmer, Cary Fukunaga, Gary Dauberman (screenplay); Jaeden Lieberher, Bill Skarsgård	
S E P T E M B E R	8	Home Again	Open Road Films	Hallie Meyers-Shyer (director/screenplay); Reese Witherspoon, Nat Wolff, Jon Rudnitsky, Pico Alexander, Lake Bell, Reid Scott, Dolly Wells, Michael Sheen, Candice Bergen, Jen Kirkman	
S E P T E M B E R	8	9/11	Atlas Distribution Company	Martin Guigui (director/screenplay); Steven Golebiowski (screenplay); Charlie Sheen, Gina Gershon, Luis Guzmán, Wood Harris, Olga Fonda, Jacqueline Bisset, Whoopi Goldberg	
S E P T E M B E R	8	The Good Catholic	Broad Green Pictures	Paul Shoulberg (director/screenplay); Zachary Spicer, Wrenn Schmidt, Danny Glover, John C. McGinley	
S E P T E M B E R	8	Fallen	Relativity Media / Mayhem Pictures	Scott Hicks (director); Michael Ross, Kathryn Price, Nichole Millard (screenplay); Addison Timlin, Jeremy Irvine, Harrison Gilbertson, Lola Kirke, Sianoa Smit-McPhee, Daisy Head, Hermione Corfield, Malachi Kirby, Chris Ashby, Joely Richardson	
S E P T E M B E R	15	American Assassin	Lionsgate / CBS Films	Michael Cuesta (director); Stephen Schiff, Michael Finch, Edward Zwick, Marshall Herskovitz (screenplay); Dylan O'Brien, Michael Keaton, Sanaa Lathan, Shiva Negar, David Suchet, Navid Negahban, Scott Adkins, Taylor Kitsch	
S E P T E M B E R	15	Mother!	Paramount Pictures	Darren Aronofsky (director/screenplay); Jennifer Lawrence, Javier Bardem, Ed Harris, Michelle Pfeiffer	
S E P T E M B E R	15	Brad's Status	Amazon Studios	Mike White (director/screenplay); Ben Stiller, Austin Abrams, Jenna Fischer, Luke Wilson, Jemaine Clement, Michael Sheen	
S E P T E M B E R	22	Kingsman: The Golden Circle	20th Century Fox	Matthew Vaughn (director/screenplay); Jane Goldman (screenplay); Colin Firth, Julianne Moore, Taron Egerton, Mark Strong, Halle Berry, Elton John, Channing Tatum, Jeff Bridges	
S E P T E M B E R	22	The Lego Ninjago Movie	Warner Bros. Pictures / Warner Animation Group / RatPac-Dune Entertainment / Vertigo Entertainment / Lin Pictures / Lord Miller Productions	Charlie Bean (director); Bob Logan, Paul Fisher (directors/screenplay); William Wheeler, Tom Wheeler, Jared Stern, John Whittington (screenplay); Dave Franco, Michael Peña, Kumail Nanjiani, Abbi Jacobson, Zach Woods, Fred Armisen, Jackie Chan, Justin Theroux, Olivia Munn	
S E P T E M B E R	22	Stronger	Lionsgate / Roadside Attractions / Bold Films	David Gordon Green (director); John Pollono (screenplay); Jake Gyllenhaal, Tatiana Maslany, Miranda Richardson, Clancy Brown	
S E P T E M B E R	22	Battle of the Sexes	Fox Searchlight Pictures	Jonathan Dayton, Valerie Faris (directors); Simon Beaufoy (screenplay); Emma Stone, Steve Carell, Andrea Riseborough, Sarah Silverman, Bill Pullman, Alan Cumming, Eric Christian Olsen, Elisabeth Shue	
S E P T E M B E R	22	Woodshock	A24	Kate and Laura Mulleavy (directors/screenplay); Kirsten Dunst, Joe Cole, Pilou Asbæk	
S E P T E M B E R	26	Jeepers Creepers 3	American Zoetrope / Myriad Pictures	Victor Salva (director/screenplay); Stan Shaw, Meg Foster, Gabrielle Haugh, Jonathan Breck, Gina Philips	
S E P T E M B E R	29	American Made	Universal Pictures / Cross Creek Pictures / Imagine Entertainment	Doug Liman (director); Gary Spinelli (screenplay); Tom Cruise, Domhnall Gleeson, Sarah Wright, Jesse Plemons, Caleb Landry Jones	
S E P T E M B E R	29	Flatliners	Columbia Pictures / Cross Creek Pictures	Niels Arden Oplev (director); Ben Ripley (screenplay); Elliot Page, Diego Luna, Nina Dobrev, James Norton, Kiersey Clemons, Kiefer Sutherland	
S E P T E M B E R	29	Mark Felt: The Man Who Brought Down the White House	Sony Pictures Classics / Mandalay Pictures	Peter Landesman (director/screenplay); Liam Neeson, Diane Lane, Marton Csokas, Ike Barinholtz, Tony Goldwyn, Tom Sizemore, Bruce Greenwood, Michael C. Hall, Brian d'Arcy James, Josh Lucas, Eddie Marsan, Wendi McLendon-Covey, Maika Monroe	

== October–December ==
Opening		Title	Production company	Cast and crew	Ref.
O C T O B E R	6	Blade Runner 2049	Warner Bros. Pictures / Alcon Entertainment / Columbia Pictures / Scott Free Productions	Denis Villeneuve (director); Hampton Fancher, Michael Green (screenplay); Ryan Gosling, Harrison Ford, Ana de Armas, Sylvia Hoeks, Robin Wright, Mackenzie Davis, Carla Juri, Lennie James, Dave Bautista, Jared Leto	
O C T O B E R	6	The Mountain Between Us	20th Century Fox / Chernin Entertainment	Hany Abu-Assad (director); Chris Weitz, J. Mills Goodloe (screenplay); Idris Elba, Kate Winslet, Dermot Mulroney, Beau Bridges	
O C T O B E R	6	My Little Pony: The Movie	Lionsgate / Hasbro Studios	Jayson Thiessen (director); Meghan McCarthy, Rita Hsiao, Michael Vogel (screenplay); Uzo Aduba, Ashleigh Ball, Emily Blunt, Kristin Chenoweth, Taye Diggs, Andrea Libman, Michael Peña, Zoe Saldaña, Liev Schreiber, Sia, Tabitha St. Germain, Tara Strong, Cathy Weseluck	
O C T O B E R	6	The Florida Project	A24	Sean Baker (director/screenplay); Chris Bergoch (screenplay); Willem Dafoe, Brooklynn Prince, Bria Vinaite, Valeria Cotto, Christopher Rivera, Caleb Landry Jones	
O C T O B E R	6	Brawl in Cell Block 99	RLJE Entertainment	S. Craig Zahler (director/screenplay); Vince Vaughn, Jennifer Carpenter, Don Johnson, Udo Kier, Marc Blucas, Tom Guiry	
O C T O B E R	13	Happy Death Day	Universal Pictures / Blumhouse Productions	Christopher Landon (director); Scott Lobdell (screenplay); Jessica Rothe, Israel Broussard	
O C T O B E R	13	Marshall	Open Road Films	Reginald Hudlin (director); Michael Koskoff, Jacob Koskoff (screenplay); Chadwick Boseman, Josh Gad, Kate Hudson, Dan Stevens, Sterling K. Brown, James Cromwell	
O C T O B E R	13	Breathe	Bleecker Street / Participant Media / The Imaginarium Studios	Andy Serkis (director); William Nicholson (screenplay); Andrew Garfield, Claire Foy, Tom Hollander, Hugh Bonneville, Dean-Charles Chapman, Ed Speleers	
O C T O B E R	13	Carving a Life	Indie Rights	Terry Ross (director); Lisa Bruhn (screenplay); Tyler Bruhn, Karenssa LeGear, Aaron Landon Bornstein, Lisa Winans, Sandi Todorovic, Jay Jee, Laura Bohlin, Navid Negahban, Tiffany Espensen	
O C T O B E R	13	Professor Marston and the Wonder Women	Annapurna Pictures	Angela Robinson (director/screenplay); Luke Evans, Rebecca Hall, Bella Heathcote, JJ Feild, Oliver Platt, Connie Britton	
O C T O B E R	13	Blood Money	Saban Films	Lucky McKee (director); Jared Butler, Lars Norberg (screenplay); John Cusack, Ellar Coltrane, Willa Fitzgerald, Jacob Artist	
O C T O B E R	20	Geostorm	Warner Bros. Pictures / Skydance Media / RatPac Entertainment	Dean Devlin (director/screenplay); Paul Guyot (screenplay); Gerard Butler, Jim Sturgess, Abbie Cornish, Alexandra Maria Lara, Daniel Wu, Eugenio Derbez, Ed Harris, Andy García	
O C T O B E R	20	Only the Brave	Columbia Pictures	Joseph Kosinski (director); Ken Nolan, Eric Warren Singer (screenplay); Josh Brolin, Miles Teller, Jeff Bridges, James Badge Dale, Taylor Kitsch, Jennifer Connelly	
O C T O B E R	20	The Snowman	Universal Pictures / Perfect World Pictures / Working Title Films	Tomas Alfredson (director); Peter Straughan, Hossein Amini, Søren Sveistrup (screenplay); Michael Fassbender, Rebecca Ferguson, Charlotte Gainsbourg, Val Kilmer, J. K. Simmons	
O C T O B E R	20	Boo 2! A Madea Halloween	Lionsgate / Tyler Perry Studios	Tyler Perry (director/screenplay); Tyler Perry, Cassi Davis, Patrice Lovely, Yousef Erakat, Diamond White, Lexy Panterra, Andre Hall, Brock O'Hurn, Tito Ortiz	
O C T O B E R	20	Same Kind of Different as Me	Paramount Pictures / Pure Flix Entertainment	Michael Carney (director/screenplay); Ron Hall, Alexander Foard (screenplay); Greg Kinnear, Renée Zellweger, Djimon Hounsou, Jon Voight	
O C T O B E R	20	Leatherface	Lionsgate / Millennium Films / DirecTV	Julien Maury, Alexandre Bustillo (directors); Seth M. Sherwood (screenplay); Stephen Dorff, Lili Taylor	
O C T O B E R	20	Wonderstruck	Amazon Studios / Roadside Attractions	Todd Haynes (director); Brian Selznick (screenplay); Oakes Fegley, Julianne Moore, Michelle Williams, Millicent Simmonds	
O C T O B E R	21	The Playground	SplitWorld Pictures / Indie Rights	Edreace Purmul (director/screenplay); Ramona Frye, Dean Mounir (screenplay); Myles Cranford, Merrick McCartha, Shane P. Allen, Christopher Salazar, Ghadir Mounib, Raye Richards, Daniel Armand, Lawrence R. Kivett, Kysha Hobbs, Evan Henderson, Jennifer Paredes	
O C T O B E R	27	Thank You for Your Service	Universal Pictures / DreamWorks Pictures / Reliance Entertainment	Jason Hall (director/screenplay); Miles Teller, Haley Bennett, Joe Cole, Amy Schumer, Beulah Koale, Scott Haze	
O C T O B E R	27	Suburbicon	Paramount Pictures	George Clooney (director/screenplay); Coen brothers, Grant Heslov (screenplay); Matt Damon, Julianne Moore, Noah Jupe, Oscar Isaac	
O C T O B E R	27	Jigsaw	Lionsgate / Twisted Pictures	The Spierig Brothers (directors); Josh Stolberg, Pete Goldfinger (screenplay); Matt Passmore, Callum Keith Rennie, Clé Bennett, Hannah Emily Anderson	
O C T O B E R	27	Novitiate	Sony Pictures Classics	Maggie Betts (director/screenplay); Margaret Qualley, Julianne Nicholson, Dianna Agron, Morgan Saylor, Maddie Hasson, Liana Liberato, Melissa Leo	
O C T O B E R	27	All I See Is You	Open Road Films / SC International Pictures	Marc Forster (director/screenplay); Sean Conway (screenplay); Blake Lively, Jason Clarke, Ahna O'Reilly, Yvonne Strahovski, Wes Chatham, Danny Huston	
O C T O B E R	28	Amityville: The Awakening	Dimension Films / Blumhouse Productions	Franck Khalfoun (director/screenplay); Jennifer Jason Leigh, Bella Thorne, Cameron Monaghan, Mckenna Grace, Thomas Mann, Taylor Spreitler, Jennifer Morrison, Kurtwood Smith	
N O V E M B E R	1	A Bad Moms Christmas	STX Entertainment / Huayi Brothers Pictures	Scott Moore, Jon Lucas (directors/screenplay); Mila Kunis, Kristen Bell, Kathryn Hahn, Cheryl Hines, Christine Baranski, Susan Sarandon	
N O V E M B E R	3	Thor: Ragnarok	Marvel Studios	Taika Waititi (director); Eric Pearson, Craig Kyle, Christopher Yost (screenplay); Chris Hemsworth, Tom Hiddleston, Cate Blanchett, Idris Elba, Jeff Goldblum, Tessa Thompson, Karl Urban, Mark Ruffalo, Anthony Hopkins	
N O V E M B E R	3	Last Flag Flying	Amazon Studios / Lionsgate	Richard Linklater (director/screenplay); Darryl Ponicsan (screenplay); Steve Carell, Bryan Cranston, Laurence Fishburne, Yul Vazquez, Cicely Tyson	
N O V E M B E R	3	Lady Bird	A24	Greta Gerwig (director/screenplay); Saoirse Ronan, Laurie Metcalf, Tracy Letts, Lucas Hedges, Timothée Chalamet, Beanie Feldstein, Stephen McKinley Henderson, Lois Smith	
N O V E M B E R	10	Murder on the Orient Express	20th Century Fox / Genre Films / Scott Free Productions	Kenneth Branagh (director); Michael Green (screenplay); Tom Bateman, Kenneth Branagh, Penélope Cruz, Willem Dafoe, Judi Dench, Johnny Depp, Josh Gad, Leslie Odom Jr., Michelle Pfeiffer, Daisy Ridley	
N O V E M B E R	10	Daddy's Home 2	Paramount Pictures / Gary Sanchez Productions	Sean Anders (director/screenplay), John Morris (screenplay); Will Ferrell, Mark Wahlberg, Linda Cardellini, John Cena, John Lithgow, Mel Gibson	
N O V E M B E R	10	LBJ	Electric Entertainment	Rob Reiner (director); Joey Hartstone (screenplay); Woody Harrelson, Michael Stahl-David, Richard Jenkins, Bill Pullman, Jeffrey Donovan, Jennifer Jason Leigh	
N O V E M B E R	10	Three Billboards Outside Ebbing, Missouri	Fox Searchlight Pictures	Martin McDonagh (director/screenplay); Frances McDormand, Woody Harrelson, Sam Rockwell, John Hawkes, Peter Dinklage	
N O V E M B E R	10	Mayhem	RLJE Films	Joe Lynch (director); Matias Caruso (screenplay); Steven Yeun, Samara Weaving, Steven Brand, Caroline Chikezie, Kerry Fox, Dallas Roberts	
N O V E M B E R	17	Justice League	Warner Bros. Pictures / RatPac Entertainment / DC Entertainment / Atlas Entertainment / Cruel and Unusual Films	Zack Snyder (director); Chris Terrio, Joss Whedon (screenplay); Ben Affleck, Henry Cavill, Amy Adams, Gal Gadot, Ezra Miller, Jason Momoa, Ray Fisher, Jeremy Irons, Diane Lane, Connie Nielsen, J. K. Simmons	
N O V E M B E R	17	The Star	Sony Pictures Animation / Walden Media	Timothy Reckart (director); Carlos Kotkin (screenplay); Steven Yeun, Gina Rodriguez, Zachary Levi, Keegan-Michael Key, Kelly Clarkson, Patricia Heaton, Kristin Chenoweth, Tracy Morgan, Tyler Perry, Oprah Winfrey	
N O V E M B E R	17	Wonder	Lionsgate / Participant Media / Walden Media	Stephen Chbosky (director/screenplay); Steven Conrad, Jack Thorne (screenplay); Julia Roberts, Owen Wilson, Jacob Tremblay, Mandy Patinkin, Daveed Diggs	
N O V E M B E R	17	Cook Off!	Lionsgate Premiere	Cathryn Michon (director/screenplay); Guy Shalem (director); Wendi McLendon-Covey, W. Bruce Cameron (screenplay); Cathryn Michon, Wendi McLendon-Covey, Melissa McCarthy, Ben Falcone, Gary Anthony Williams, Niecy Nash, Jack Plotnick, Diedrich Bader, Phil LaMarr, Jordan Black, Romy Rosemont, Roy Jenkins, Cristine Rose, Jennifer Elise Cox, Markie Post, Marcia Wallace, Gavin MacLeod, Cedric Yarbrough, Stephen Root, Louie Anderson	
N O V E M B E R	17	Mr. Roosevelt	Paladin	Noël Wells (director/screenplay); Noël Wells, Nick Thune, Britt Lower, Daniella Pineda, Andre Hyland, Doug Benson, Armen Weitzman, Sergio Cilli	
N O V E M B E R	17	Roman J. Israel, Esq.	Columbia Pictures / Cross Creek Pictures / Image Nation / Escape Artists	Dan Gilroy (director/screenplay), Denzel Washington, Colin Farrell	
N O V E M B E R	22	Coco	Walt Disney Pictures / Pixar Animation Studios	Lee Unkrich (director); Adrian Molina, Matthew Aldrich (screenplay); Anthony Gonzalez, Gael García Bernal, Benjamin Bratt, Alanna Ubach, Renée Victor, Ana Ofelia Murguía, Edward James Olmos	
N O V E M B E R	24	Call Me by Your Name	Sony Pictures Classics	Luca Guadagnino (director); James Ivory (screenplay); Armie Hammer, Timothée Chalamet, Michael Stuhlbarg, Amira Casar, Esther Garrel, Victoire Du Bois	
D E C E M B E R	1	The Disaster Artist	A24 / Good Universe	James Franco (director); Scott Neustadter, Michael H. Weber (screenplay); James Franco, Dave Franco, Seth Rogen, Alison Brie, Ari Graynor, Josh Hutcherson, Jacki Weaver	
D E C E M B E R	1	The Shape of Water	Fox Searchlight Pictures	Guillermo del Toro (director/screenplay); Vanessa Taylor (screenplay); Sally Hawkins, Michael Shannon, Richard Jenkins, Doug Jones, Michael Stuhlbarg, Octavia Spencer	
D E C E M B E R	1	Wonder Wheel	Amazon Studios	Woody Allen (director/screenplay); Jim Belushi, Juno Temple, Justin Timberlake, Kate Winslet	
D E C E M B E R	8	I, Tonya	Neon	Craig Gillespie (director); Steven Rogers (screenplay); Margot Robbie, Sebastian Stan, Julianne Nicholson, Bobby Cannavale, Allison Janney	
D E C E M B E R	8	Just Getting Started	Broad Green Pictures	Ron Shelton (director/screenplay); Morgan Freeman, Tommy Lee Jones, Rene Russo, Joe Pantoliano, Glenne Headly, Sheryl Lee Ralph, Elizabeth Ashley, George Wallace, Graham Beckel, Jane Seymour, Johnny Mathis	
D E C E M B E R	15	Star Wars: The Last Jedi	Lucasfilm Ltd.	Rian Johnson (director/screenplay); Mark Hamill, Carrie Fisher, Adam Driver, Daisy Ridley, John Boyega, Oscar Isaac, Andy Serkis, Lupita Nyong'o, Domhnall Gleeson, Anthony Daniels, Gwendoline Christie, Kelly Marie Tran, Laura Dern, Benicio del Toro	
D E C E M B E R	15	Ferdinand	20th Century Fox / Blue Sky Studios	Carlos Saldanha (director); Robert L. Baird, Tim Federle, Brad Copeland (screenplay); John Cena, Kate McKinnon	
D E C E M B E R	15	Beyond Skyline	Vertical Entertainment	Liam O'Donnell (director/screenplay); Frank Grillo, Bojana Novakovic, Jonny Weston, Callan Mulvey, Iko Uwais, Pamelyn Chee, Yayan Ruhian, Betty Gabriel, Antonio Fargas	
D E C E M B E R	20	Jumanji: Welcome to the Jungle	Columbia Pictures / Seven Bucks Productions	Jake Kasdan (director); Chris McKenna, Erik Sommers, Scott Rosenberg, Jeff Pinkner (screenplay); Dwayne Johnson, Jack Black, Kevin Hart, Karen Gillan, Nick Jonas, Bobby Cannavale	
D E C E M B E R	20	The Greatest Showman	20th Century Fox / Chernin Entertainment	Michael Gracey (director); Jenny Bicks, Bill Condon (screenplay); Hugh Jackman, Zac Efron, Michelle Williams, Rebecca Ferguson, Zendaya	
D E C E M B E R	22	Pitch Perfect 3	Universal Pictures	Trish Sie (director); Kay Cannon, Mike White (screenplay); Anna Kendrick, Rebel Wilson, Hailee Steinfeld, Brittany Snow, Anna Camp, Hana Mae Lee, Alexis Knapp, John Michael Higgins, Elizabeth Banks	
D E C E M B E R	22	Downsizing	Paramount Pictures	Alexander Payne (director/screenplay); Jim Taylor (screenplay); Matt Damon, Christoph Waltz, Hong Chau, Kristen Wiig	
D E C E M B E R	22	Father Figures	Warner Bros. Pictures	Lawrence Sher (director); Justin Malen (screenplay); Owen Wilson, Ed Helms, J. K. Simmons, Terry Bradshaw, Ving Rhames, Harry Shearer, June Squibb, Christopher Walken, Glenn Close	
D E C E M B E R	22	The Post	20th Century Fox / DreamWorks Pictures / Amblin Entertainment	Steven Spielberg (director); Josh Singer, Liz Hannah (screenplay); Meryl Streep, Tom Hanks, Sarah Paulson, Bob Odenkirk, Tracy Letts, Bradley Whitford, Bruce Greenwood, Matthew Rhys	
D E C E M B E R	22	Bright	Netflix	David Ayer (director); Max Landis (screenplay); Will Smith, Joel Edgerton, Noomi Rapace, Lucy Fry, Édgar Ramírez, Ike Barinholtz	
D E C E M B E R	22	Crooked House	Vertical Entertainment / Sony Pictures	Gilles Paquet-Brenner (director/screenplay); Julian Fellowes, Tim Rose Price (screenplay); Glenn Close, Terence Stamp, Max Irons, Stefanie Martini, Julian Sands, Gillian Anderson, Christina Hendricks	
D E C E M B E R	22	Hostiles	Entertainment Studios	Scott Cooper (director/screenplay); Christian Bale, Rosamund Pike, Wes Studi, Jesse Plemons, Adam Beach, Rory Cochrane, Ben Foster	
D E C E M B E R	25	All the Money in the World	TriStar Pictures / Scott Free Productions	Ridley Scott (director); David Scarpa (screenplay); Michelle Williams, Christopher Plummer, Mark Wahlberg, Romain Duris	
D E C E M B E R	25	Molly's Game	STX Entertainment	Aaron Sorkin (director/screenplay); Jessica Chastain, Idris Elba, Kevin Costner, Michael Cera, Jeremy Strong, Chris O'Dowd, Bill Camp	
D E C E M B E R	25	Phantom Thread	Focus Features / Annapurna Pictures	Paul Thomas Anderson (director/screenplay); Daniel Day-Lewis, Lesley Manville, Vicky Krieps	

== See also ==
- List of 2017 box office number-one films in the United States
- 2017 in the United States
