= Gil Next Door =

Independent animated web series

- Genre: Comedy
- Created by: Ross Bollinger
- Written by: Ross Bollinger
- Directed by: Ross Bollinger
- Voices of: Cedric Williams; Michael Johnston
- Theme music composer: Brendan Cooney; Adam Johnson
- Composers: Brendan Cooney; Adam Johnson
- Countries of origin: United States; Ireland
- Original language: English
- No. of episodes: 1

Production
- Producer: Ross Bollinger
- Running time: 10 minutes
- Production companies: Pencilmation Studios; Studio Meala

Original release
- Network: YouTube
- Release: December 13, 2025

Gil Next Door is an independent animated web series created by Ross Bollinger. The pilot episode set premiered on YouTube.

== Voice cast ==
- Cedric Williams as Gil
- Michael Johnston as Wolly Pondbottom

== Episodes ==
No.	Title	Original release date
1	"I Like Mayors"	December 13, 2025
