= Bornless Ones =

- Directed by: Alexander Babaev
- Written by: Alexander Babaev
- Produced by: Devin Goodsell
- Starring: Margaret Judson; Devin Goodsell; Michael Johnston; Mark Furze
- Cinematography: Egor Povolotskiy
- Edited by: Alexander Babaev
- Music by: Paul Hartwig
- Distributed by: Uncork'd Entertainment
- Release date: February 10, 2017
- Running time: 80 minutes
- Country: United States
- Language: English

Bornless Ones is a 2017 American supernatural horror film written and directed by Alexander Babaev. Starring Margaret Judson, Devin Goodsell, Michael Johnston and Mark Furze. The film was released on 10 February 2017.

== Plot ==
Emily moves into a remote house with her brother Zach, who has severe cerebral palsy, hoping to provide him with better care. Joined by her fiancé and friends, they discover mysterious symbols covering the house and unknowingly remove them, releasing a malevolent supernatural force. As the group is terrorized and possessed one by one, Emily must confront the evil entity while struggling to save her brother and survive the night.

== Cast ==
- Margaret Judson as Emily
- Devin Goodsell as Jesse
- Michael Johnston as Zach
- Mark Furze as Woodrow

== Release ==
Bornless Ones was released in a limited theatrical run on February 10, 2017, by Uncork'd Entertainment.
