= Laura Stahl =

American voice actress

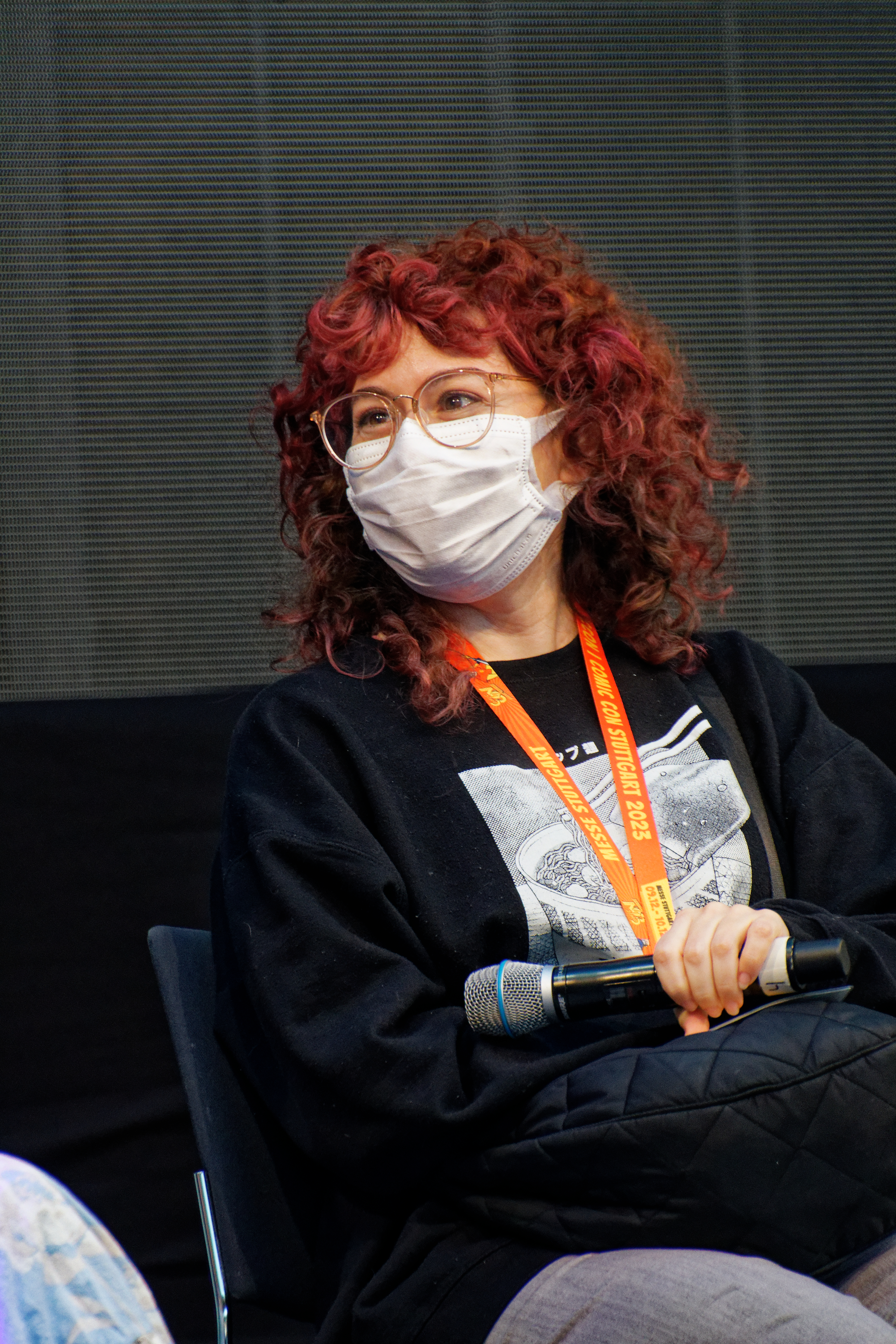
- Stahl in 2024
- Occupations: Voice actress; voice director
- Years active: 2017–present

Laura Stahl is an American voice actress and voice director, known for her work on anime dubs.

== Personal life ==
She is of African American and Jewish descent.

== Filmography ==
=== Anime series ===
List of voice performances in anime series
Year	Title	Role	Notes	Source
2017	Berserk	Serpico (young)		
2017	Little Witch Academia	Wangari		
2018	A.I.C.O. -Incarnation-	Ryota Tachibana		
2018	Granblue Fantasy: The Animation	Aaron (young)		
2018	Fate/Extra Last Encore	Leonardo Bistario Harwey		
2018	SwordGai The Animation	Kuromaru		
2018	Beyblade Burst Turbo	Aiger Akabane	Lead role	
2018	The Seven Deadly Sins	Gerheade		
2018	Sirius the Jaeger	Yuliy (young)		
2019	Sword Art Online Alternative Gun Gale Online	Clarence		
2019	JoJo's Bizarre Adventure: Diamond Is Unbreakable	Hayato Kawajiri		
2019	Gundam Build Divers	Ron		
2019	The Promised Neverland	Ray	Main role	
2019	Cells at Work!	Naive T Cell		
2019	Fate/Grand Order – Absolute Demonic Front: Babylonia	Ushiwakamaru		
2019	Welcome to Demon School! Iruma-kun	Iruma	Lead role	
2019	Isekai Cheat Magician	Muller		
2020	Ascendance of a Bookworm	Gil		
2020	Pokémon: Twilight Wings	Bea		
2020	Beyblade Burst Rise	Aiger Akabane		
2020	Rent-A-Girlfriend	Mami Nanami		
2020	Great Pretender	Dorothy		
2020	Akudama Drive	Sister		
2021	The Way of the Househusband	Gin		
2021	Bungo and Alchemist -Gears of Judgement-		Voice director	
2021	Vinland Saga	Thorfinn (child)	VSI/Netflix dub	
2021	Shaman King	Tao Ren		
2021	Yashahime	Hikomaru		
2021	Beyblade Burst Surge	Aiger Akabane		
2021	Moriarty the Patriot	Louis James Moriarty (young)		
2021	Edens Zero	Homura Kōgetsu		
2021	Battle Game in 5 Seconds	Yuuri Amagake		
2021	Dropout Idol Fruit Tart	Nayu Nukui		
2021	Pokémon Evolutions	Zinnia		
2021	Love Live! Nijigasaki High School Idol Club	Setsuna Yuki		
2021	Hortensia Saga	Marius Casterede	Lead role	
2022	LBX Girls	Yui		
2022	Life with an Ordinary Guy Who Reincarnated into a Total Fantasy Knockout	Hinata Tachibana (Female)		
2023	Pluto	Atom		
2024	Delicious in Dungeon	Izutsumi		

=== Animated series ===
List of voice performances in animated series
Year	Title	Role	Notes	Source
2019	YooHoo to the Rescue	Trevor, Supee		
2020-present	Rainbow High	Sunny Madison	Main role	
2020-present	Rainbow High	Avery Styles		
2020-present	Rainbow High	Luna Madison		
2020	Miraculous: Tales of Ladybug & Cat Noir	Camilla Hombee/Victory		

=== Films ===
List of voice performances in film
Year	Title	Role	Notes	Source
2017	Mobile Suit Gundam Thunderbolt: Bandit Flower	Bianca Carlyle		
2018	Shopkins Wild	Scarlet Gateau		
2020	The Academy of Magic	Aura	Lead role	
2021	Homunculus	Nanako		
2021	The Seven Deadly Sins: Cursed by Light	Gerheade		
2022	Bubble	Usagi		

=== Video games ===
List of voice performances in video games
Year	Title	Role	Notes	Source
2019	Shantae and the Seven Sirens	Vera		
2020	Guardian Tales	Lynn		
2020	Genshin Impact	Barbara, Xinyan, Dusky Ming		
2020	Phantasy Star Online 2	Hitsugi Yasaka		
2021	Ys IX: Monstrum Nox	Ingrid		
2021	Monster Hunter Rise	Komitsu		
2021	Guilty Gear Strive	Ramlethal Valentine, Sharon	Replaced Erin Fitzgerald as voice of Ramlethal.	
2022	Phantom Breaker: Omnia	Shizuka Saejima		
2022	Soul Hackers 2	Nana		
2022	Star Ocean: The Divine Force	Additional voices		
2022	Goddess of Victory: Nikke	Volume, Milk, Snow White	Credited in-game	
2023	Fire Emblem Heroes	Alear (Female)		
2023	Fire Emblem Engage	Alear (Female)		
2023	Octopath Traveler II	Additional voices		
2023	Sand Land	Additional voices		
2023	Master Detective Archives: Rain Code	Kurane		
2023	The Legend of Heroes: Trails into Reverie	Jona Sacred, Soldiers & Citizens of Zemuria		
2023	Rune Factory 3 Special	Carmen		
2023	Rhapsody II: Ballad of the Little Princess	Sonia Francis Zeolight, Crowdia		
2023	Rhapsody III: Memories of Marl Kingdom	Sonia Francis Zeolight, Crowdia		
2023	Detective Pikachu Returns	Rachel Myers		
2023	Anonymous;Code	Juno Saionji		
2024	Persona 3 Reload	Additional voices		
2025	Xenoblade Chronicles X: Definitive Edition	Alicia		
2025	Mario Kart World	Toadette	Replaced Samantha Kelly	
