= Slash (film) =

- Theatrical release poster
- Directed by: Clay Liford
- Written by: Clay Liford
- Produced by: Brock Williams; Jason Wehling; Traci Carlson; Steven Berger; Jeryll Adler
- Starring: Michael Johnston; Jessie Ennis; Hannah Marks; Michael Ian Black; Missi Pyle; Sarah Ramos; Peter Vack
- Cinematography: Ellie Ann Fenton
- Edited by: Bryan Poyser
- Production companies: Boxcar Films; Arts+Labor; Glass House Productions
- Distributed by: Gravitas Ventures
- Release dates: March 13, 2016 (SXSW); December 9, 2016 (United States)
- Running time: 100 minutes
- Country: United States
- Language: English

Slash is a 2016 American comedy film directed and written by Clay Liford. The film stars Michael Johnston, Hannah Marks, Michael Ian Black, Missi Pyle, Sarah Ramos, Peter Vack, Jessie Ennis, and Matt Peters.

== Plot ==
Fifteen-year-old Neil Shafer is a nerd in high school whose secret passion is writing slash – amateur fiction that imagines erotic relationships between the two male characters of various TV and film series. His specialty is the book and film series Vanguard. Neil is greatly embarrassed when another student snatches the exercise book that contains his writings, and it is shown all around the school. It is picked up by Julia Jordan, who thinks it is hers. Neil and Julia discover a common interest in writing slash and quickly become best friends.

She urges Neil to publish his work on the fan fiction website The Rabbit Hole and he soon gains a following. At the same time, Neil is not sure about his own sexuality and whether he is gay or attracted to Julia. Julia pushes Neil to attend a special session held by the Rabbit Hole at a comic book convention, Comicpalooza, where they have been invited to come and read their works. Neil has also struck up a conversation with Denis, a gay fellow reader of his work, who urges him to meet up. Neil lies and says that he is eighteen years old to gain entry, but this causes problems when the truth is found out.

== Cast ==
- Michael Johnston as Neil
- Hannah Marks as Julia
- Jessie Ennis as Martine
- Peter Vack as Mike Holloway
- Missi Pyle as Ronnie
- Sarah Ramos as Marin
- Robert Longstreet as Blake
- Angela Kinsey as Anglaxia Supremacy IV
- Laura Bailey as Laylanath Inquisitrix VII
- Luciana Faulhaber as Luxalia Contendrax III
- Liza Oppenheimer as Merculliax Pernicious IX
- John Ennis as Deron Zaxa
- Lucas Neff as The Kragon
- Tishuan Scott as Vanguard
- Michael Ian Black as Denis
- Allie DeBerry as Jessie Hunt
- Burnie Burns as Mr. Snow
- Matt Peters as Mr. Ford
- Isaac Ireland as Nintendo DS Kid

== Production ==
Filming began in June 2015 in Austin. Producing by Brock Williams through Boxcar Films and Jason Wehling through Arts+Labor. The film had its world premiere at SXSW on March 13, 2016.
