= The Academy of Magic =

- Directed by: Jorgen Klubien
- Written by: Jorgen Klubien; Cindy Robinson
- Produced by: Allen Tsang
- Starring: Laura Megan Stahl; Michael Johnston; Ben Diskin; Michael Orenstein; Grant George; Jamieson Price; Philece Sampler
- Edited by: Andreas Birch Eriksen
- Production company: Gold Valley Films
- Distributed by: Level 33 Entertainment (United States)
- Release dates: May 25, 2020 (United Kingdom); May 15, 2021 (China); March 25, 2025 (United States)
- Running time: 87 minutes
- Countries: China; United States
- Language: English
- Box office: $617,475

The Academy of Magic (Chinese: 魔法学院, lit. 'Magic Academy') is a 2020 animated fantasy film directed and written by Jorgen Klubien. The film's story follows Aura, who is gifted with magical abilities and must unveil secrets her academy has.

The film was first released in international markets starting with the United Kingdom on May 25, 2020. The film was later released in China on May 15, 2021, and in the United States on March 25, 2025.

== Synopsis ==
Aura is gifted with magical abilities; she and her friends have many exciting adventures at the academy, but soon Aura learns that the school hatches many dark secrets that she must uncover. Will she be able to unveil the truth?

== Cast ==
- Laura Megan Stahl as Aura, a 16-year old girl
- Michael Johnston as Shawn
- Ben Diskin as Yodel
- Michael Orenstein as Frank
- Grant George as Miller
- Jamieson Price as Lambert
- Philece Sampler as Auntie

== Release ==
The Academy of Magic was first released in international markets, starting with the United Kingdom on May 25, 2020. The film was later released in China on May 15, 2021, and in the United States on March 25, 2025.

== Reception ==
Jennifer Green of Common Sense Media gave the film three out of five stars, and wrote "While it may not stand out for older kids or teens, it could be a fun watch for younger children who love adventure and fantasy".
