= Jorgen Klubien =

Danish animator, storyboard artist, and writer (born 1958)

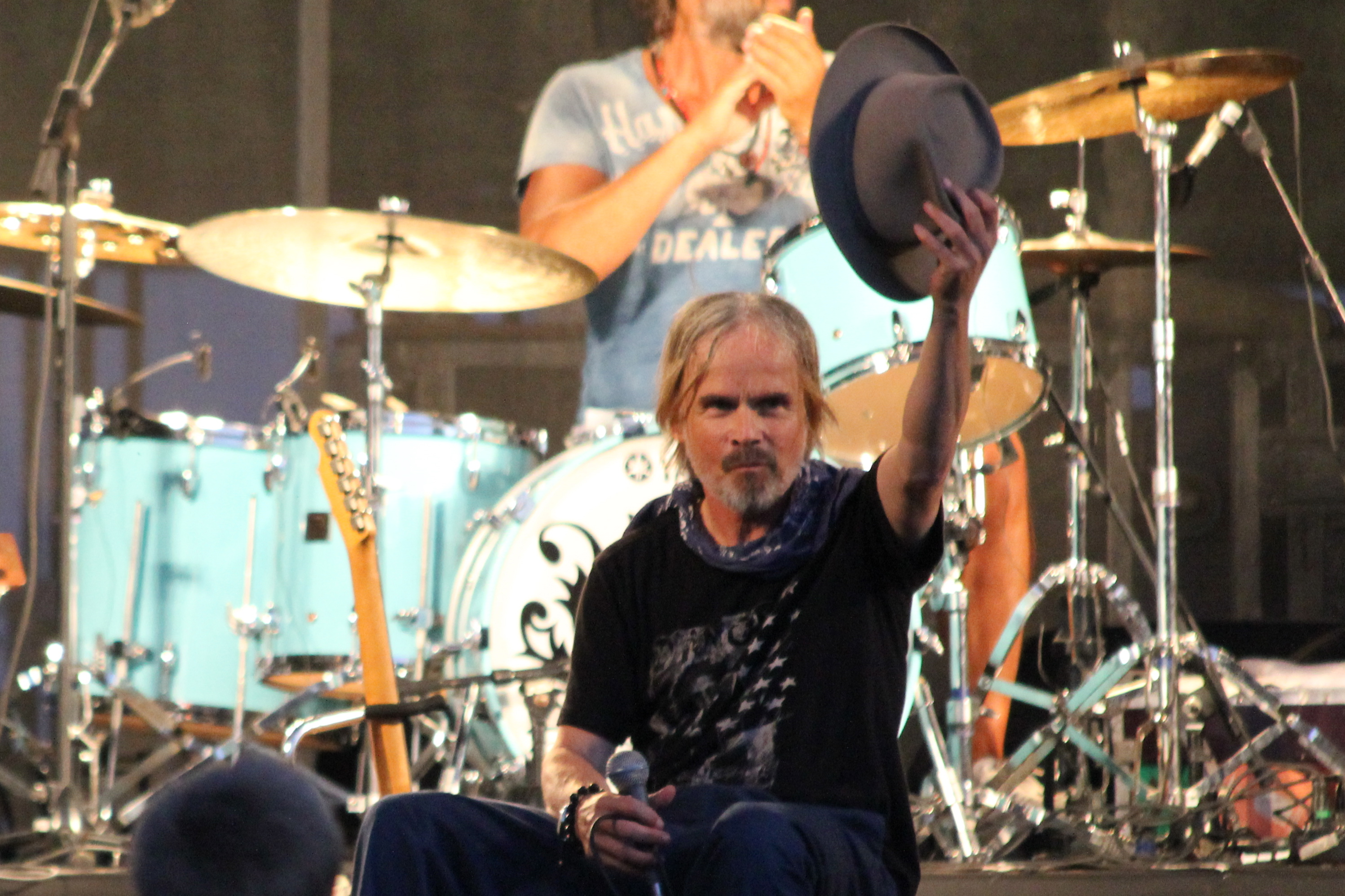
- Klubien in Odense 2012.
- Born: 20 May 1958 (age 68)
- Occupations: Animator, storyboard artist, writer, musician
- Years active: 1981–present

Jorgen Klubien (born 20 May 1958) is a Danish animator, storyboard artist, writer, and musician. He has worked on Disney films, including The Nightmare Before Christmas (1993), The Lion King (1994), A Bug's Life (1998), Cars (2006) and Frankenweenie (2012). He's also active as a Disney comics artist.

== Early life ==
In the 1960s, young Klubien developed an interest in American popular culture. At the age of 16, he managed to pay the Disney Studios a visit, where a friend of the family introduced him to some working animators. Fascinated by the magic of animation Klubien went back to Denmark to practice, and at 19 he returned to the US, now a student at CalArts at the "Character Animation" studio after which he was offered a permanent job at the Disney Studios.

== Career ==
Klubien is best known for working on many animated films, such as Oliver & Company (1988), The Little Mermaid (1989), The Rescuers Down Under (1990), Pocahontas (1995), James and the Giant Peach (1996), Mulan (1998), Toy Story 2 (1999), Monsters, Inc. (2001), Shrek Forever After (2010), Free Birds (2013), The Emoji Movie (2017), Wonder Park (2019), Dumbo (2019), The Academy of Magic (2020), and The Adventures of Tikki the Wonder Dog (2023).

However, along with the thriving animation career, Klubien formed and nursed a Danish-based pop band, "Danseorkestret", with which he wrote and produced several Danish chart hits. Jorgen Klubien still writes and publishes music – now in his own name.

== Filmography ==
=== Film ===
- Peter-No-Tail (1981) – (animator)
- Otto Is a Rhino (1983) – (animator)
- Pee-wee's Big Adventure (1985) – (cel animator)
- An American Tail (1986) – (additional animator)
- The Brave Little Toaster (1987) – (character animator)
- Oliver & Company (1988) – (character animator)
- The Little Mermaid (1989) – (character animator)
- The Rescuers Down Under (1990) – (character animator: Wilbur)
- The Very Hungry Caterpillar and Other Stories (1993) – (animator)
- The Nightmare Before Christmas (1993) – (storyboard artist)
- The History of the Wonderful World (1993) – (animator)
- The Lion King (1994) – (story)
- Pocahontas (1995) – (additional story development)
- The Baby-Sitters Club (1995) – (cel animator)
- James and the Giant Peach (1996) – (storyboard artist)
- Mulan (1998) – (additional story material)
- A Bug's Life (1998) – (storyboard artist)
- Toy Story 2 (1999) – (additional storyboard artist)
- Monsters, Inc. (2001) – (additional storyboarding)
- Curious George (2006) – (storyboard artist)
- Cars (2006) – (original story by) / (screenplay by) / additional storyboarding)
- Shrek Forever After (2010) – (additional story artist)
- Frankenweenie (2012) – (storyboard artist) / (art department illustrator: Los Angeles)
- Free Birds (2013) – (additional storyboard artist)
- The Emoji Movie (2017) – (storyboard artist)
- Wonder Park (2019) – (story artist)
- Dumbo (2019) – (development story beat boards & character design)
- The Academy of Magic (2020) – (director/writer)
- Scooby-Doo! The Sword and the Scoob (2021) – (storyboard artist)
- The Adventures of Tikki the Wonder Dog (2026) – (writer)
