= Endangered Species (2021 film) =

- Film poster
- Directed by: M. J. Bassett
- Screenplay by: M. J. Bassett; Isabel Bassett
- Story by: Paul Chronnell
- Produced by: M. J. Bassett; Kwesi Dickson; Molly Hassell; Jay Taylor
- Starring: Rebecca Romijn; Jerry O'Connell; Philip Winchester; Michael Johnston
- Edited by: Andrew MacRitchie
- Music by: Scott Shields
- Distributed by: Lionsgate Films
- Release date: May 28, 2021
- Running time: 101 minutes
- Country: United States
- Language: English

Endangered Species is a 2021 action-adventure film directed by M. J. Bassett. Bassett has long had a passion for conservation, and she wrote and directed the film in part to bring attention to the issue of the illegal wildlife trade and other dangers to the environment. In the film, an American family must survive when they are stranded in the Kenyan savanna.

== Plot ==
Jack Halsey, his wife Lauren, Lauren's two children (from her previous marriage) Zoe and Noah, and Zoe's boyfriend Billy arrive at Amboseli Park in Kenya for a safari vacation. Jack, who is at risk of losing his job, is concerned about the expense of the trip, and his constant complaining causes a rift in the family, especially between him and Zoe with whom he has a strained relationship.

Having cancelled certain activities to save money, Jack chooses to take the family on safari without a guide. During their drive, he ignores a sign and enters a restricted area. When they unknowingly come between a rhinoceros and its young, the rhino rams into their van and overturns it, wounding Jack's leg and shattering their water bottles. Lauren, who is a type I diabetic, finds her insulin is broken as well. Hyenas then surround the family, who retreat to the van to hide.

Noah and Billy walk toward higher ground to attempt to get a phone signal. Before they can ask for help, a leopard attacks Billy, who is badly injured and dragged away. Noah flees back to the van, which they then decide to abandon, fearing the hyenas will return again in greater numbers. Meanwhile, an injured Billy awakes in a tree with the leopard sleeping nearby. He manages to get away and walks back to the van, only to find it empty.

While making their way through the park, Jack, Lauren, Zoe and Noah are surrounded by a larger group of hyenas; two men arrive firing guns and scare them away. The family gratefully accompany the men back to their camp. While sitting around the campfire, Zoe notices a bloody rhinoceros horn from the rhinoceros that overturned their car and realizes the men are poachers. They tie the family up and plan to kill them. One of the men, Mitch, accuses Jack of hypocrisy for criticising poachers while working in the oil industry, which he says is even more destructive to the planet. Mitch argues that he is merely helping indigenous people benefit from their land, rather than listening to foreigners who try to control them.

Meanwhile, a sightseeing couple stumble upon the family's van and rescue Billy. Back at the campsite, Jack tearfully reconciles with Zoe and Noah, telling them he loves them like they are his own even if they don't see him as their dad. He then manages to break free from his bonds, freeing the children as well. Jack runs to create a distraction while Noah and Zoe help Lauren, who is now unconscious due to going hours without insulin, into one of the poacher's vehicles.

The poachers catch up with Jack and shoot him, while Mitch goes after Zoe, Noah and Lauren in another vehicle. After a brief chase, Mitch crashes his Jeep, then stumbles out and discovers he is surrounded by hyenas who close in and kill him. An anti-poaching unit arrives, with the help of Billy, and rescues the family. The family later recover in hospital before visiting a wildlife enclosure for orphaned animals, which has been dedicated in memory of Jack.

== Cast ==
- Rebecca Romijn as Lauren Halsey
- Philip Winchester as Jack Halsey
- Michael Johnston as Noah Halsey
- Isabel Bassett as Zoe Halsey
- Chris Fisher as Billy Mason
- Jerry O'Connell as Mitch Hanover

== Reception ==
The film received mostly negative reviews. Reviewers generally noted the film's good intentions in aiming to raise awareness about poaching and other threats to wildlife, while criticizing the script and the film's overall predictability. Variety praised the film's "handsome location shot imagery" but called the story formulaic, hindered even further by an uneven tone as the film's bloody violence clashes with its core of less consequential family drama. Phil Hoad of The Guardian also noted this element, stating, "All the ingredients are here for a dusty, merciless thriller tussling with nature in tooth and claw. But despite the horrific circumstances, Endangered Species remains inexplicably stuck in the perky comic register of a US sitcom." Other critics commented that viewers would find it difficult to sympathize with the film's protagonists. For example, in San Jose Mercury News, Randy Myers described the main characters as "whiny" and "arrogant," while Richard Whittaker argued that the film's plot seemed to serve as "background noise while they sort out their issues." On review aggregator Rotten Tomatoes, the film holds an approval rating of 19% based on 21 reviews.
