= Steven Molony =

- Born: Fargo, North Dakota, U.S
- Occupation: Actor
- Years active: 2002–present

Steven Molony is an American actor, screenwriter and film producer. His film roles include tha pert of Alex in Pinching Penny, for which he received the award for Best Leading Actor in a Feature Film at the 2011 Indie Fest. He played Dr. Jeremiah Arkham in the webseries The Joker Blogs. He appeared in the feature film Efficiency, for which he also wrote the screenplay, playing identical twins. As a part of the film's fundraising on Kickstarter, Molony offered to perform randomly selected stunts for a $5 donation. It was shown at both the Dances With Films and the Austin Film Festivals. Both the film and Molony were awarded by the 2014 Accolade Global Film Competition with Awards of Excellence.

He also appeared in Oxenfree and Valley of Bones."Valley of Bones (2017)". IMDb.
