= Michael Johnston (actor) =

American actor (born 1996)

- Johnston in 2025
- Born: February 22, 1996 (age 30); Ruth, North Carolina, U.S.
- Occupation: Actor
- Years active: 2012–present
- Website: michaeljvo.com

Michael Johnston (born February 22, 1996) is an American actor. He appeared as supporting character Corey Bryant in the MTV series Teen Wolf, and had starring roles in the independent film Slash (2016) and as Baron "Bear" Bailey in the horror film Obsession (2025), with the latter bringing him critical attention. He is also a voice actor for animation and video games, including as the English voice of Mikleo in Tales of Zestiria and its anime adaptation.

== Early life ==
Johnston was born on February 22, 1996 to a Southern Baptist family. He grew up in Ruth, North Carolina. After graduating from high school early, he moved with his father to Chicago, where he studied acting at The Second City. After six months there, he moved to Los Angeles.

== Career ==
=== Early work ===
After unlocking a behind-the-scenes featurette in the video game Mortal Kombat: Deadly Alliance that showed voice actors recording character vocalizations, Johnston became interested in voice acting. Inspired by the video, he began creating two-dimensional point-and-click and Flash games, for which he performed his own voiceovers.

When he was 12 years old, he started auditioning for voice-over roles in commercials, animation, unpaid fan dubs, and student animation projects from a recording studio he had set up in his bedroom. At age sixteen, he booked his first paid role, in a Little Caesars commercial. He also provided narration for the Wubble Bubble Ball infomercials in 2014.

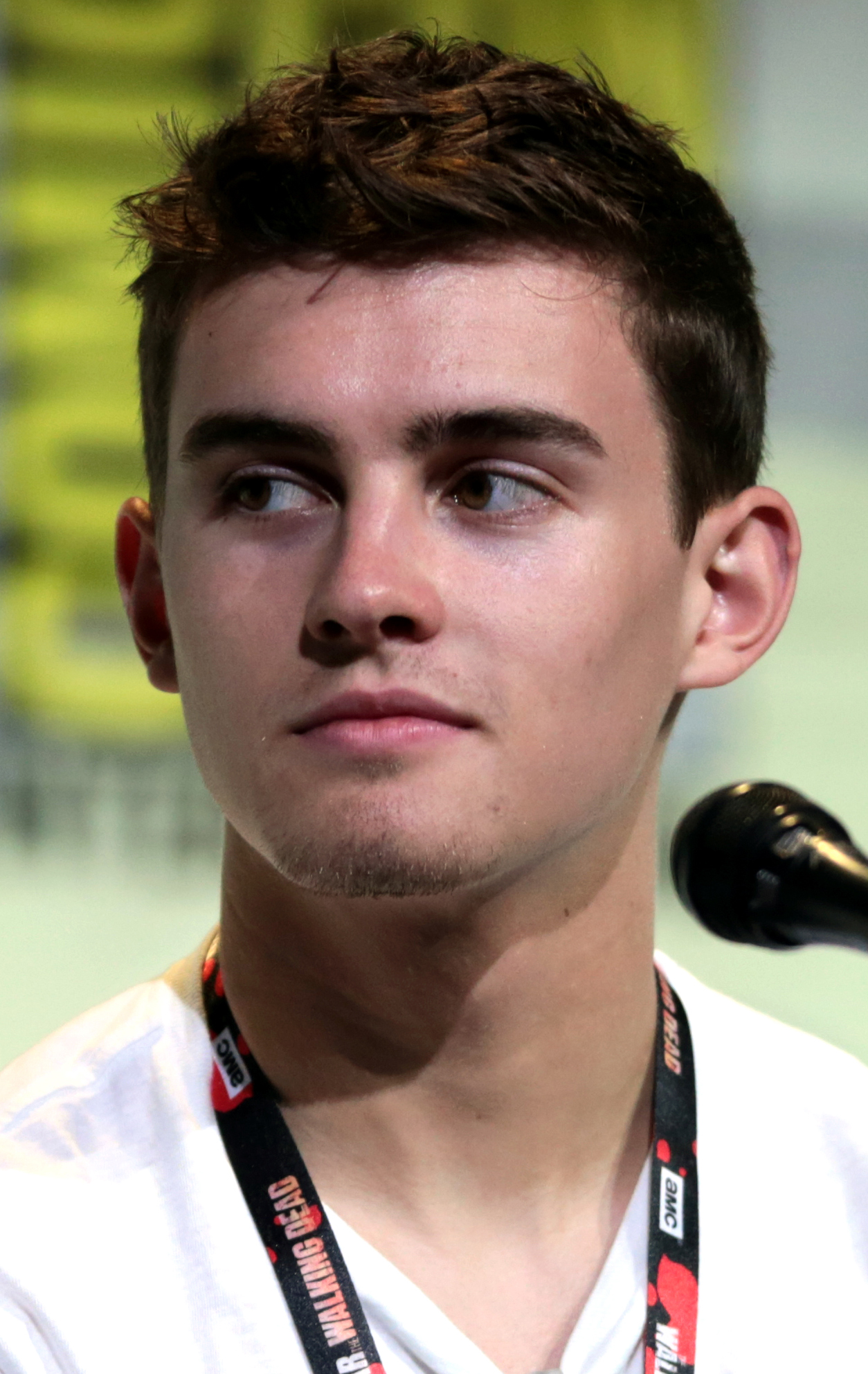
Johnston at the 2016 San Diego Comic-Con

=== Voice acting ===
Johnston has voiced characters for video games, including Reed in Dust: An Elysian Tail, Mikleo in Tales of Zestiria, and Ephemer in Kingdom Hearts III. He also provided his voice for roles in TV shows such as Atsushi Minegishi in Nagi-Asu: A Lull in the Sea and the eponymous character, Conrad Zacharie "Zak" Storm, in Zak Storm (both for English dubs). For films, he voiced the English dubbed versions of characters like Wasabi Kawamura in Ride Your Wave (2019), Shawn in The Academy of Magic (2020), and Hiiragi Yatsuse in My Oni Girl (2024). Johnston also currently voices the young Nathan Summers in the Marvel Studios Animation series X-Men '97 (2024).

=== Television ===
Johnston appeared in a small role in MTV's teen comedy-drama Awkward. He then played Corey Bryant, a recurring character in the final two seasons of Teen Wolf, from 2015 to 2017.

=== Film ===
In 2016, Johnston had the lead role in the comedy film Slash, where he played Neil, a 15-year-old high school student who writes slash fiction. He also appeared in the indie supernatural horror film Bornless Ones (2017). In 2021, he played Noah Halsey in action-adventure film Endangered Species.

Johnston received attention in 2026 for his lead role as Baron "Bear" Bailey in the supernatural-horror film Obsession (2025), which premiered at the Toronto International Film Festival. Johnston's performance has been praised as a critique of the "nice guy". Following his breakthrough role in Obsession, Johnston signed with The Gersh Agency for film, television, and brand partnerships.

In July 2026, Johnston was cast in the untitled Mummy film co-starring opposite Brendan Fraser and Rachel Weisz. He took boxing lessons for the role.

=== Music ===
Johnston published a song titled "Gravity" in 2022; its release was supported by a music video in 2024. Johnston's father is also a musician.

== Personal life ==
Johnston is openly gay, and has stated he was aware of this from around the ages of 11 or 12. Due to his Southern Baptist upbringing, he attempted to hide his sexuality, stating he thought he was an "abomination". After moving to Los Angeles at 18, he became more comfortable with his sexuality. He has stated that his role in Teen Wolf as the openly gay character Corey Bryant was a catalyst in accepting himself.

Johnston previously dated writer and filmmaker Anthony Sellitti.

== Filmography ==
=== Film ===
Year	Title	Role	Notes	Ref.
2012	Bee Wars	Buzzalot	Voice	
2012	Totes Burgers	Evan	Short film	
2016	Slash	Neil Shafer		
2017	Bornless Ones	Zach		
2017	The Maestro	Pietro Castelnuovo-Tedesco		
2018	Crazy for the Boys	Chad		
2019	Ride Your Wave	Wasabi Kawamura	Voice; English dub	
2020	The Academy of Magic	Shawn	Voice	
2021	Endangered Species	Noah Halsey		
2024	My Oni Girl	Hiiragi Yatsuse	Voice; English dub	
2025	Obsession	Baron "Bear" Bailey		
2027	The Mummy: Book of the Dead	TBA	Filming	

=== Television ===
Year	Title	Role	Notes	Ref.
2012–2014	TOME: Terrain of Magical Expertise	Bubb / additional voices	Voice; 3 episodes	
2015	Tales of Zestiria: Dawn of the Shepherd	Mikleo	Voice; English dub	
2015	Awkward	Senior	Episode: "The Graduates"	
2015	Nagi-Asu: A Lull in the Sea	Atsushi Minegishi	Voice; English dub	
2015–2017	Teen Wolf	Corey Bryant	25 episodes	
2016	Tales of Zestiria the X	Mikleo	Voice; English dub (credited as Philip Lamont)	
2016	Pure Genius	Luke Wallace	Episode: "It's Your Friendly Neighborhood Spider Silk Surgery"	
2016–2018	Zak Storm	Conrad Zacharie "Zak" Storm	Voice; English dub	
2017	Home: Adventures with Tip & Oh	Keanu	Voice; episode: "Tip's Deep Dish / Garbage Day"	
2018	Supergirl	Adam	Episode: "Rather the Fallen Angel"	
2020	Demon Slayer: Kimetsu no Yaiba	Shoichi	Voice; English dub	
2022	S.W.A.T.	Watson	Episode: "Cry Foul"	
2023	Akuma-kun	Akuma II / Ichirō Umoregi	Voice; English dub	
2024	Time Patrol Bon	Thoth / additional voices	Voice; English dub	
2024–present	X-Men '97	Nathan Dayspring	Voice; 3 episodes	
2025–present	Gil Next Door	Wolly Pondbottom	Voice	
2025-2026	Valt the Wonder Deer	Valt	Voice; English dub (Season 3)	
2026	Nippon Sangoku: The Three Nations of the Crimson Sun	Tonotsugu Taira	Voice; English dub	
2026	9-1-1	Sam Drayton	Episode: "Where There's Smoke"	

=== Video games ===
Year	Title	Voice role	Notes	Ref.
2012	Dust: An Elysian Tail	Reed		
2015	Tales of Zestiria	Mikleo	English dub	
2017	Fire Emblem Heroes	Lugh		
2017	Kingdom Hearts HD 2.8 Final Chapter Prologue	Ephemer	English dub	
2018	Last Year: The Nightmare	Nick		
2019	Kingdom Hearts III	Ephemer	English dub	
2019	The Blackout Club	Male Player / Daxton		
2019	Concrete Genie	Zach		
2020	Marvel's Avengers	Dante		
2020	Terrain of Magical Expertise	CrashR		
2021	The Artful Escape	Francis Vendetti		
2021	Demon Slayer: Kimetsu no Yaiba – The Hinokami Chronicles	Shoichi	English dub	
2023	Paranormal Files: Silent Willow	Peter		
2023	The Texas Chain Saw Massacre	Danny		
2024	Demon Slayer: Kimetsu no Yaiba – Sweep the Board	Shoichi	English dub	
2026	God of War Sons of Sparta	Theophilos		
2026	Fire Emblem: Fortune's Weave	Peter		

== Discography ==
- "Gravity" (single, 2022; music video, 2024)

== Awards and nominations ==
Award	Year	Work	Category	Result	Ref.
Critics' Choice Super Awards	2026	Obsession	Best Actor in a Horror Movie	Nominated	
Critics' Choice Super Awards	2026	Obsession	Best Villain in a Movie	Nominated	
