= Valley of Bones =

- Directed by: Dan Glaser
- Written by: Dan Glaser; Steven Molony; Richard M. Lewis
- Produced by: Jon L. Wanzek; Dan Glaser; Steven Molony; Luke Taylor; Janek Ambros
- Starring: Autumn Reeser; Rhys Coiro; Steven Molony
- Cinematography: Michael Alden Lloyd
- Edited by: Dan Glaser
- Music by: Michael Kramer; Corey Wallace
- Production companies: Bad Medicine Films; Buffalo 8 Productions
- Distributed by: Smith Global Media
- Release date: September 1, 2017
- Running time: 90 minutes
- Country: United States
- Language: English

Valley of Bones is a 2017 American adventure/crime thriller film directed by Dan Glaser and starring Autumn Reeser, Rhys Coiro and Steven Molony. Jon L. Wanzek of Bad Medicine Films was the writer, producer and executive producer. It was released in theaters on September 1, 2017 and received mixed reviews from critics.

== Plot ==
A disgraced paleontologist struggling to raise her son is tipped off to a groundbreaking dig site in the Badlands, embarks on a journey through the badlands of western North Dakota to search for a monumental T. rex fossil. She has to team up with a recovering meth addict, with unpaid debts to a drug cartel and threatens to bury them both under the weight of their criminal pasts.

== Cast ==
- Autumn Reeser as Anna
- Rhys Coiro as Nate
- Steven Molony as McCoy
- Mason Mahay as Ezekiel
- Alexandra Billings as Kimberly
- Bill Smitrovich as Bill
- Mark Margolis as El Papá
- Muse Watson as Terry
- Brandon Heitkamp as Bryce
- Van White as Reese
- Maddisyn Carter as Julie

== Production ==
Jon L. Wanzek of Bad Medicine Films was the writer, producer and executive producer, his first full independent feature film. Most of the film was shot on Wanzek's Pitchfork Ranch property near Amidon, North Dakota. Valley of Bones was distributed by Smith Global Media/Sony Pictures and released across the United States in September 2017.
