= Jon Wanzek =

Former President and Owner of Wanzek Construction

Jon L. Wanzek
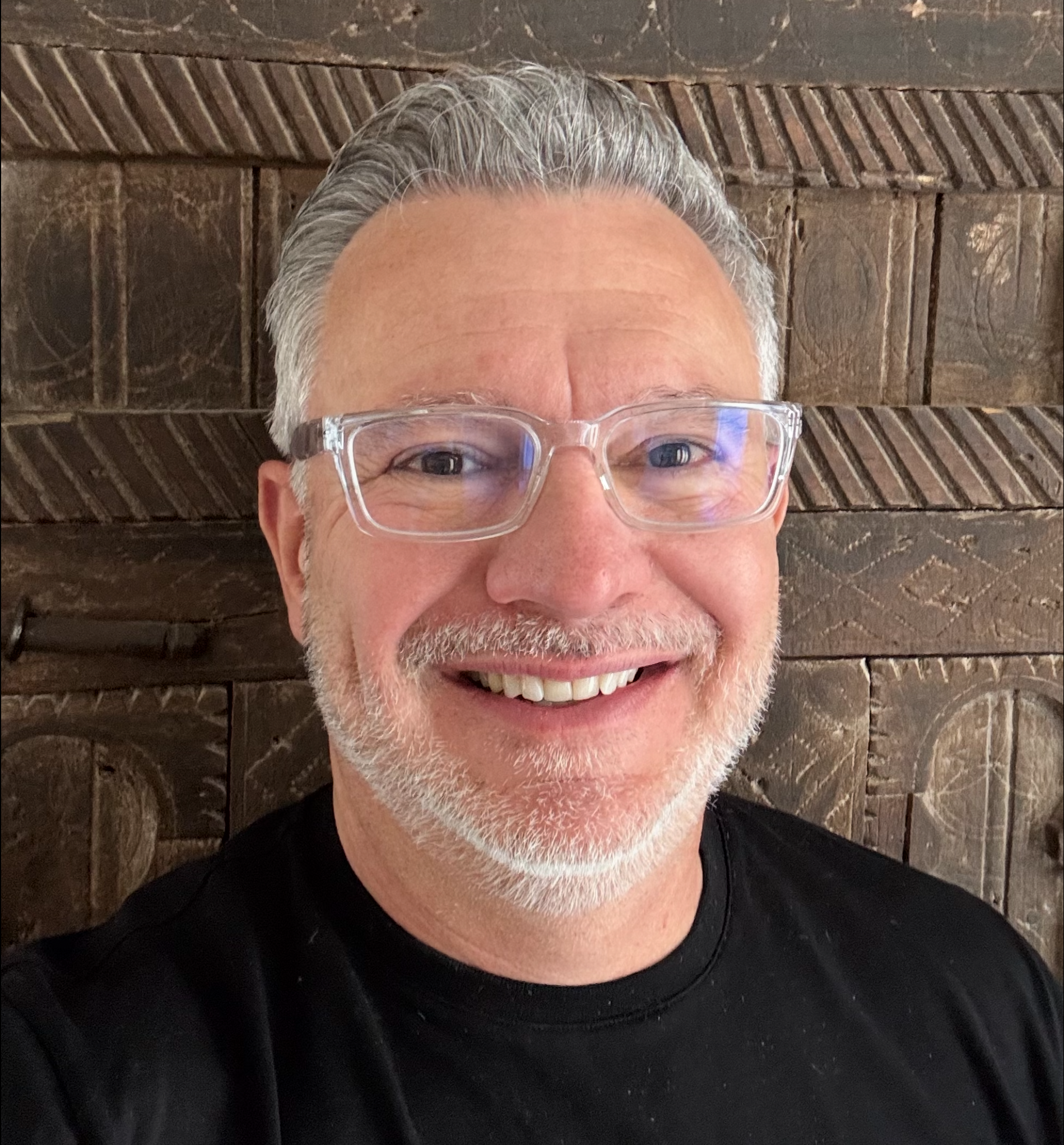
- Born: May 10, 1964 (age 61); Medina, North Dakota, U.S.
- Education: BS, civil engineering
- Alma mater: University of Minnesota
- Occupation: Film producer
- Known for: Bad Medicine Films; Producer of Valley of Bones
- Website: jonwanzek.com

Jon Leo Wanzek (born May 10, 1964) is the former President and Owner of Wanzek Construction. He is also an American film producer, having produced Valley of Bones and other films as part of his production company Bad Medicine Films.

== Business career ==
Wanzek received a degree in Civil Engineering from the University of Minnesota at Minneapolis in 1986. After various jobs, he returned to his parents company Wanzek Construction, Inc as a project engineer, eventually becoming president and CEO of the family business. After the sale of Wanzek Construction, Inc. to MasTec in 2008, he has been involved in real estate and ranching.

== Film career ==
A North Dakota-based, independent film production company, Bad Medicine Films was established by Wanzek in 2012 and is named after his cabin and lake property on Bad Medicine Lake in Minnesota. His first project was in 2015 when Wanzek was the Executive Producer on the movie Ten Thousand Saints, a film based on a novel by Eleanor Henderson. The movie premiered at the Sundance Film Festival in 2015.

That same year, Wanzek produced and developed a script for Valley of Bones, his first full independent feature film. Most of the film was shot on Wanzek's Pitchfork Ranch property near Amidon, North Dakota. Valley of Bones was distributed by Smith Global Media/Sony Pictures and released across the United States in September 2017.

In 2019, Wanzek produced Human Capital, a remake of the 2013 Italian film of the same name, which was based on the novel by Stephen Amidon. The film premiered at the Toronto Film Festival on September 6, 2019.

== Philanthropy ==
Wanzek, through the Wanzek Family Foundation has supported many charities. Organizations supported include the Mayo Clinic, Theodore Roosevelt Medora Foundation, St. James Basilica, and Boy Scouts of America.

== Filmography ==
Year	Title	Producer	Executive Producer	Synopsis	Reference
2015	Ten Thousand Saints	No	Yes	Jude is a teenage boy who is trying to reconnect with his father Les in 1987 Manhattan.	
2016	Pilgrim	No	Yes	Takes place in a lawless time where magic is believed to exist by an idealistic few.	
2017	Valley of Bones	Yes	Yes	A paleontologist struggling to raise her son is tipped off to a dig site in the Badlands.	
2019	Human Capital	No	Yes	The lives of two different families collide when their children begin a relationship that leads to a tragic accident. It is a remake of an Italian Film.	
2023	Doglike	No	Yes	Laura, a young homeless woman from London, finds shelter in an underground train station where she encounters a psychology professor waiting for his next train.	
