= Margaret Judson =

American actress

- Born: Arlington Heights, Illinois, US
- Education: University of Illinois at Urbana–Champaign
- Occupation: Actress
- Years active: 2012–present
- Website: Margaret Judson on X Margaret Judson on Instagram

Margaret Judson is an American actress. A native of Arlington Heights, Illinois, she appeared on The Newsroom, an HBO drama.

== Early life ==
Judson graduated from the University of Illinois at Urbana–Champaign in 2008 with a degree in Broadcast Journalism.

== Career ==
Judson began her broadcast career at the NBC Page Program, where she worked with television personalities such as Lorne Michaels, Jimmy Fallon and Brian Williams. She then worked as a research assistant to Keith Olbermann on MSNBC's Countdown with Keith Olbermann.

Judson was offered a role on the TV show The Newsroom after series creator Aaron Sorkin shadowed her at MSNBC while doing research for the show. She initially was a consultant for the show, but eventually auditioned for and won the role of Tess Westin.
