= Cinema Extreme =

UK short film funding awards scheme

Cinema Extreme was a major UK short film funding awards scheme, created in 2002. The scheme was funded by the UK Film Council's New Cinema Fund and Film4 and managed by The Bureau with the aim "to seek out and develop filmmakers with a distinctive directorial voice and cinematic flair". The fund was awarded on an annual basis, offering funding to a slate of around four short films.

Nineteen films were commissioned. They have been shown at festivals around the world and won numerous awards including Best Short at the Edinburgh International Film Festival for Duane Hopkins' Love Me or Leave Me Alone and the Oscar for Best Short Film for Andrea Arnold's Wasp.

The scheme has catapulted many of the commissioned filmmakers to their first feature:

- Wasp director Andrea Arnold went on to direct Red Road which won the Cannes Jury Prize in 2006;
- A Changed Man director Jens Jonsson went on to direct God Morgon Alla Barn;
- Love Me or Leave Me Alone director Duane Hopkins and producer Samm Haillay are in post-production on Better Things;
- The Bypass producer Trevor Ingman is producing feature documentary The Meerkats;
- Get the Picture director Rupert Wyatt and producer Adrian Sturges are in post-production on The Escapist;
- Soft director Simon Ellis and producer Jane Hooks are in post production on Dogging: A Love Story;
- Dog's Mercury director Martin Raddich and producer Jane Hooks are in production on Crack Willow.

== 2010 ==
Film	Director(s)	Producer(s)	Writer(s)	Recipient	Date	Award
Baby	Daniel Mulloy	Ohna Falby	Daniel Mulloy		5/10/10	£25,000
Native Son	Scott Graham	David Smith	Scott Graham	Broken Spectre Ltd	22/11/09	£25,000
Gymnasts	Martina Amati	Gavin Emerson			20/5/10	£25,000
The Pizza Miracle	Tony Grisoni	Mike Elliot	Tony Grisoni	Emu Films Ltd	24/3/10	£25,000

== 2006 ==
Film	Director(s)	Producer(s)	Writer(s)	Recipient	Date	Award
Hallo Panda	Ben Blaine, Chris Blaine	Quinny Sacks, Barrington Paul Robinson	Ben Blaine, Chris Blaine	Charlie Productions Ltd	5/4//06	£25,000
Soft	Simon Ellis	Jane Hooks	Simon Ellis	Bub Ltd	22/3/06	£25,000
Dog's Mercury	Martin Radich	Jane Hooks		Warp Films Ltd	4/5/06	£25,000
Honeymoon	Miranda Bowen	Lisa Trnovski, Miranda Bowen	Miranda Bowen	2am Films Ltd	15/3/06	£25,000
After the Rain	Gaelle Dennis		Gaelle Dennis, Sibel Armutcu	Passion Pictures	14/6/6	£25,000

== 2004/2005 ==
Film	Director(s)	Producer(s)	Writer(s)	Recipient	Date	Award
Monsters	Rob Morgan	Sylvie Bringas	Rob Morgan	Animus Films Ltd	21/4/04	£25,000
Strange Little Girls	Savina Dellicour	Josie Law	Savina Dellicour	Lunar Productions Ltd	31/04/04	£25,000
One Minute Past Midnight	Celia alan Julve	Paola Minazzato	Celia Galan Julve	Intrepido Ltd	17/03/04	£25,000
Get the Picture	Rupert Wyatt	Adrian Sturges	Rupert Wyatt	Picture Farm Ltd	12/11/03	£28,152
Floating	Mark Walker	Lachlan Mackinnon	Mark Walker	Intrepido Ltd	13/01/04	£25,000

== 2003 ==
Film	Director(s)	Producer(s)	Writer(s)	Recipient	Date	Award
The Bypass	Amit Kumar	Trevor Ingman	Amit Kumar	Yaffle Films Ltd	15/5/03	£25,043
Wasp	Andrea Arnold	Lisa Bryer	Andrea Arnold	Cowboy Films Ltd	15/5/03	£25,000
Love Me or Leave Me a Alone	Duane Hopkins	Samm Haillay	Duane Hopkins	Third Films Ltd	29/01/03	£25,000
A Changed Man	Jens Jonsson	Robert Herman	Jens Jonsson	Stink Ltd	11/12/02	£25,000
