= Arta Dobroshi =

Kosovar-Albanian actress

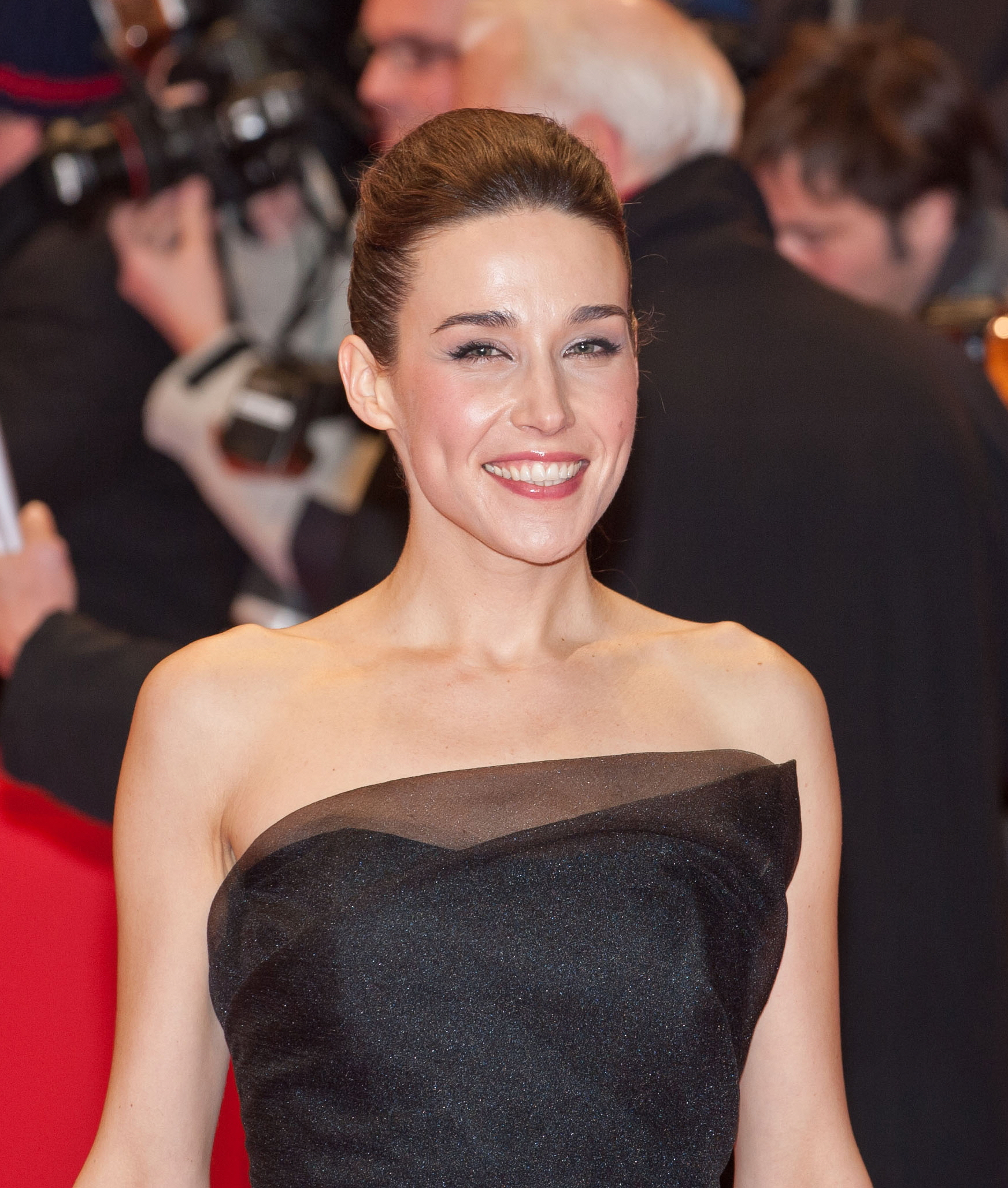
- Dobroshi in 2013
- Born: Arta Dobroshi; 2 October 1980 (age 44); Pristina, SAP Kosovo, SFR Yugoslavia
- Occupations: Actress; producer
- Years active: 2005–present

Arta Dobroshi (born 2 October 1980) is a Kosovo-Albanian actress and producer. Dobroshi is the first Kosovan actress to walk the red carpet at the Cannes Film Festival, the Berlin International Film Festival and the Sundance Film Festival and be nominated for the European Film Award. Dobroshi is a former refugee and now a UN Champion and Goodwill Ambassador.

== Early life ==
Arta Dobroshi was born in Pristina, to Kosovo Albanian parents. She has been studying the performing arts since elementary school and attended the Academy of Arts acting and drama course in Pristina for four years. She starred in many short films and theatre plays whilst a student there. When Arta was fifteen, she went on a student exchange program to North Carolina, where she starred in drama plays. After her first year at the academy, the Kosovo War escalated and Dobroshi's grandparents were imprisoned by Serbian authorities for trying to open an Albanian-language university. When Serbian President Slobodan Milošević resigned in October 2000, Dobroshi quit her job at the refugee camp and became a translator for NATO.

== Career ==
After the war period, she took roles in the local theaters and Albanian movies, as well as a leading role in the German-Albanian production Magic Eye (2005).

While performing a play in Sarajevo, Dobroshi met Luc and Jean-Piere Dardenne who offered her an open casting in Kosovo for Lorna's Silence. She was offered the title role, despite not speaking French, and earned a nomination in the Best Actress category, at the European Film Awards and at the Toronto Film Critics Association Awards 2009.

Dobroshi starred in the short film Baby by BAFTA winning director Daniel Mulloy. Baby won the Best Short Film Award when it premièred at the Edinburgh International Film Festival 2010 and won Best International Short Film at Cork Film Festival. Dobroshi was awarded Best Actress for her role in Baby at the 24fps International Short Film Festival.

=== Other work ===
Dobroshi was a jury member of the 59th Berlin International Film Festival.

On 22 December 2008, Dobroshi was appointed by the United Nations Development Programme (UNDP) as a MDG Champion / Goodwill Ambassador for Kosovo. The UNDP were impressed by her previous charity work and believed that her high-profile would help raise awareness on issues.

Dobroshi won the 2017 BAFTA Film Award for producing the refugee film Home.

In 2016, Dobroshi was the lead in the acclaimed Massive Attack video Come Near Me.

Upon receiving the 2017 Gold Lion in Cannes Lions International Festival of Creativity Dobroshi broke protocol to give a powerful message to the world "I am Arta Dobroshi, my nationality is happy and I live in the city called earth".

== Filmography ==
Year	Title	Role	Notes
2022	You Won't Be Alone	Stamena	
2020	Gangs of London	Floriana	Television series; 8 episodes
2019	Drita	Drita	Also executive producer
2018	Stray	Grace	Best Actress Award – Antipodean Film Festival
2016	Home		Executive producer
2015	Atis	Mother	Also producer
2014	Gently, Gently	Anna	
2013	Mitrovica		
2013	A Cold Day		
2012	Three Worlds (Trois mondes)	Vera	Best Actress Award – TheWIFTS Foundation International Visionary Awards
2012	Nëna	Fatmire	
2011	Late Bloomers (Trois fois 20 ans)	Maya	
2011	Baby	Sara	Best Actress Award – 24FPS International Short Film Festival
2008	Lorna's Silence (Le silence de Lorna)	Lorna	Best Actress Nomination – European Film Award; Best Actress Nomination – Toronto Film Critics Association Awards; Best Actress Nomination – Cannes Film Festival
2007	Vera	Vera	
2006	The Sadness of Mrs. Snajdrova (Smutek paní Snajdrové)	Ema	
2005	Magic Eye (Syri magjik)	Viola	Best Actress Award – Skopje International Film Festival
2002	Netët e Zullumadhit	Girlfriend	

== Personal life ==
Dobroshi can speak Albanian, English, and French, and can understand Macedonian.

== Awards ==
- Shooting Stars Award (2013) at the Berlin International Film Festival by European Film Promotion
- Women's International Film and Television Showcase LA 2012, Best Actress Award
- European Film Award 2008, Nomination as Best Actress
- Toronto Film Critics Association Awards 2009, Nomination as Best Actress
