= Jack O'Connell (actor) =

English actor (born 1990)

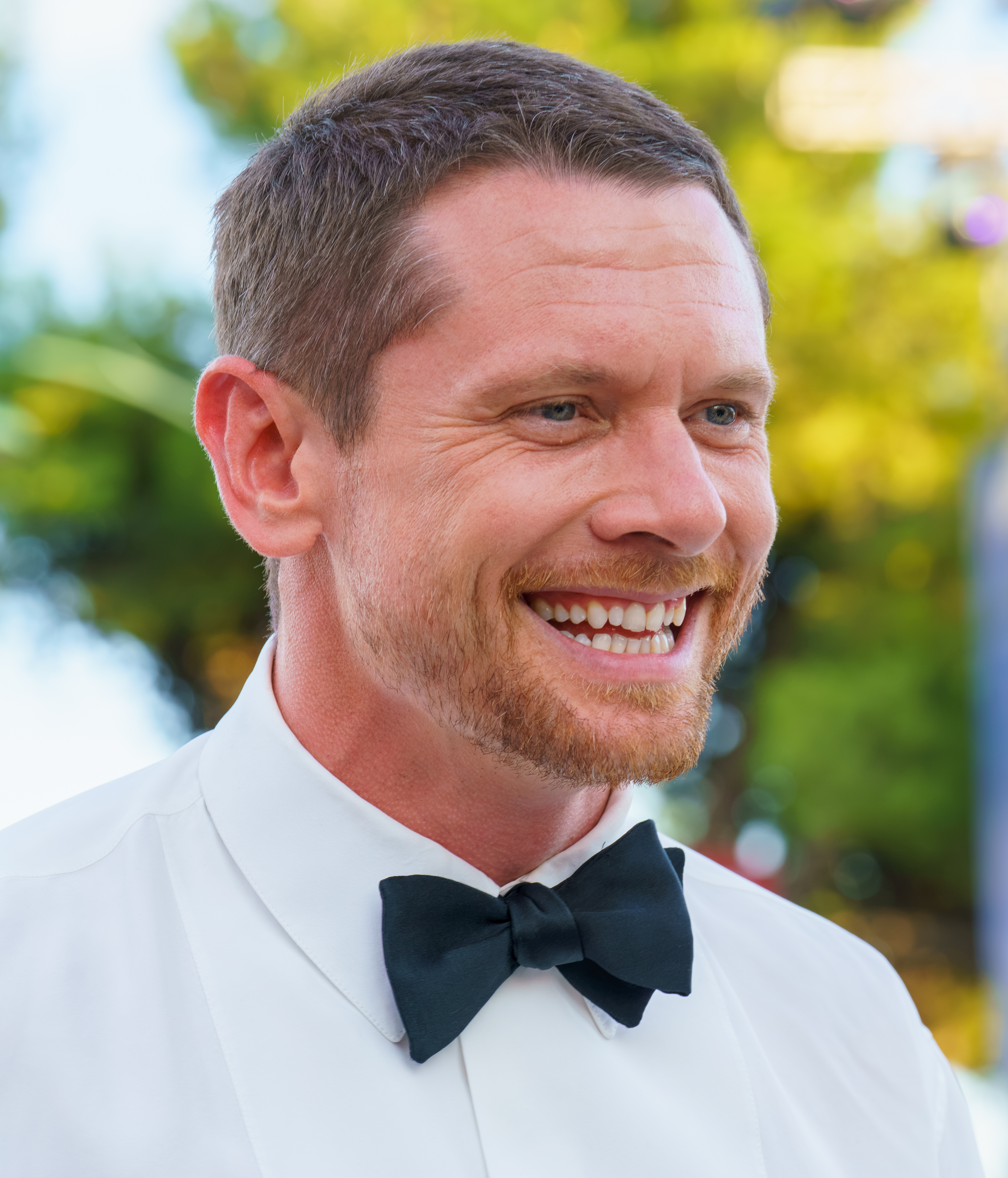
- O'Connell in 2026
- Born: 1 August 1990 (age 36); Alvaston, Derbyshire, England
- Occupation: Actor
- Years active: 2005–present
- Children: 1

Jack O'Connell (born 1 August 1990) is an English actor. He has received various accolades, including a British Academy Film Award, an Actor Award and a Gotham Award. He first gained recognition for playing James Cook in the British television series Skins (2009–2010, 2013). He is also known for his roles in the coming-of-age film This Is England (2006), the horror-thriller Eden Lake (2008), the television dramas Dive (2010) and United (2011), and the Netflix Wild West miniseries Godless (2017), for which he received a Critics' Choice Television Award nomination.

O'Connell gave critically acclaimed performances in the independent films Starred Up (2013) and '71 (2014), garnering nominations for the British Independent Film Awards. He subsequently starred as war hero Louis Zamperini in the war film Unbroken (2014), and received the BAFTA Rising Star Award. He has since starred in the thriller Money Monster (2016), the biographical drama Trial by Fire (2018), the BBC miniseries The North Water (2021), the BBC series SAS: Rogue Heroes (2022–present), the Amy Winehouse biographical film Back to Black (2024), the horror film Sinners (2025), and as Jimmy Crystal in the post-apocalyptic horror films 28 Years Later (2025) and 28 Years Later: The Bone Temple (2026).

== Early life ==
Jack O'Connell was born on 1 August 1990 into a working-class family in Alvaston, Derbyshire, England. His father, Johnny Patrick O'Connell, was an Irish citizen from Ballyheigue, Ireland, who worked on the British railways for the Bombardier Transportation Company until his death from pancreatic cancer in 2009. His mother, Alison (née Gutteridge), who is English, was employed by the British Midland airline before taking on management of her son's career. His younger sister, Megan, is an actress. As the grandson of Ken Gutteridge, a player and later manager at Burton Albion FC, O'Connell aspired to become a professional footballer. He played as a striker for Alvaston Rangers and was later scouted by Derby County FC, where he had trials. After a series of injuries ended his career, he wanted to join the British Army, believing it to be his only realistic option to make an honest living. His parents sent him to the Army Cadet Force when he was 12 with the aim of teaching him discipline, but his juvenile criminal record prevented him from enlisting in the army.

As a youth, O'Connell was in and out of court on charges related to alcohol and violence, and he received a one-year young offender's referral order when he was 17. Regarding his past transgressions, he has described himself as 'a product of [his] environment'. At age 16, O'Connell left Saint Benedict Catholic School with two GCSEs in drama and English. He later reflected on his 'brutal' experience at Saint Benedict: 'What I learnt aside from anything academic at school was probably very valuable lessons in terms of how to lie, how to play the game, how to play authority against itself.' He took an interest in acting during the compulsory drama classes, and from age 13 he attended the free Television Workshop in Nottingham, where he trained in drama twice a week. He began attending auditions in London, where he sometimes slept outside because he was unable to afford a hotel. He eventually moved to Hounslow in London, working in between acting parts as a farmhand in Cobham, Surrey.

== Career ==
=== Beginnings (2005–2008) ===
Since the start of his career, O'Connell has mainly played young delinquents; The New York Times writer John Freeman noted retrospectively, 'If a British film called for a tough case, a grappler, someone with a bit of grit, chances were O'Connell got the part. [He] has delivered one gripping physical performance after another, bringing an electric authenticity to the portrayal of angry, troubled youth.' O'Connell made his professional acting debut in 2005 when he played a runaway with anger issues in an episode of Doctors, followed by a recurring role as a boy accused of rape in The Bill. His stage debut came that same year after a rendition of the play The Spider Men by the Television Workshop was selected to be performed at the Royal National Theatre in London. O'Connell played his debut film role in This Is England (2006), a critically acclaimed coming-of-age drama set in the skinhead subculture of the early 1980s. At age 15, he was deemed too old to play the main character, leading filmmaker Shane Meadows to write the supporting role of the belligerent Pukey specifically for him.

During 2007, O'Connell appeared in television episodes of Waterloo Road, Holby City and Wire in the Blood. He played a 15-year-old pupil involved in a sexual relationship with his teacher in the play Scarborough, first performed at the Edinburgh Festival before its transfer the following year to London's Royal Court Theatre. Variety's David Benedict wrote of his stage performance, 'His sincere grasp of Daz's innocent tenderness is, paradoxically, a sign of the character's—and the actor's—unexpected maturity.' In the horror–thriller Eden Lake (2008), which received positive reviews, O'Connell played a psychopathic gang leader who terrorises a young couple. He next starred as a juvenile delinquent in 'Between You and Me' (2008), an educational film produced by the Derbyshire Constabulary, followed by a minor role in the ITV serial Wuthering Heights (2009).

=== Breakthrough and critical acclaim (2009–2021) ===
O'Connell first found fame, chiefly among people his age, as the troubled and hard-living James Cook in the third and fourth series of the E4 teen drama Skins (2009–10). Grantland writer Amos Barshad opined that among his co-stars, which included Dev Patel and Nicholas Hoult, none 'ever quite matched the luminescent, leering mania of O'Connell's Cook. As a preposterously ramped up bad boy, Cook was almost like a baby Tyler Durden.' He won a TV Choice Award for Best Actor for his performance in the fourth series. O'Connell later reprised his role in the feature-length special Skins Rise (2013), which follows a twenty-something Cook on the run from authorities. He has said of Cook, 'He's probably the most similar character to myself that I had the good fortune of portraying', though he noted that, unlike Cook, he had matured beyond adolescence.

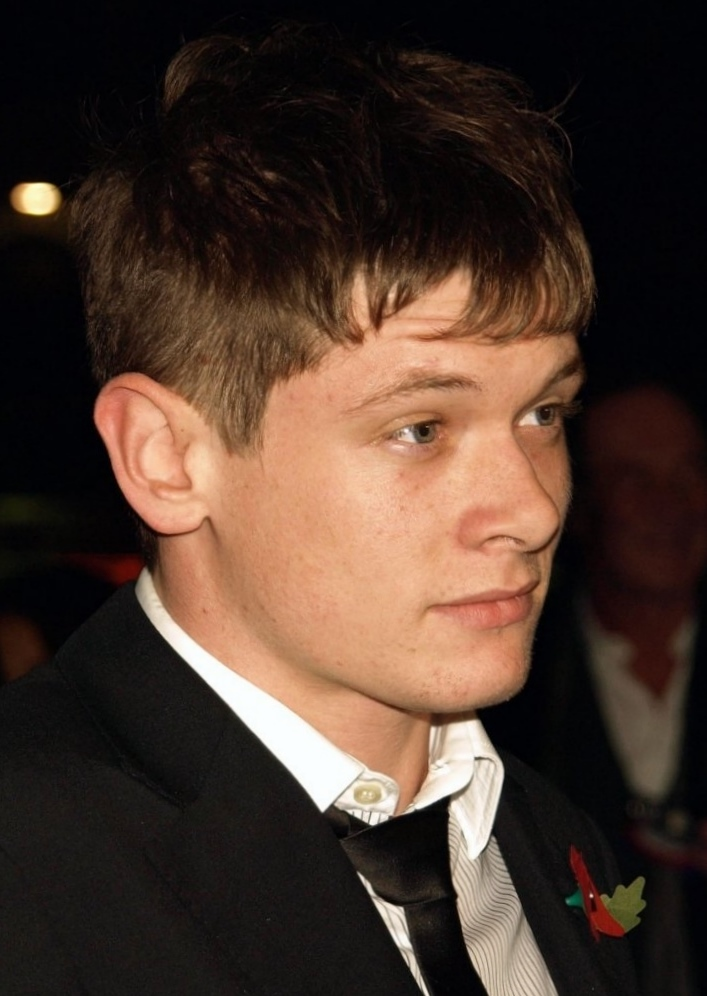
O'Connell at the premiere of Harry Brown in November 2009

In the vigilante thriller Harry Brown (2009), which polarised critics, O'Connell played an abused child turned vicious gang member. He impressed lead actor Michael Caine, who shouted "Star of the future!" at him during filming. His portrayal of a teenaged father in the BBC Two drama Dive (2010) earned him critical praise; Euan Ferguson of The Guardian described it as 'a performance that is of an actor twice his years: mesmerising, comedic and soulful.' The Daily Telegraph critic Olly Grant concurred, writing, 'He was a revelation; nuanced, understated, wise beyond his years.' Following a lead role in the Sky1 serial The Runaway (2011), set in the criminal underworld of 1970s London, O'Connell starred as football player Bobby Charlton in another well-received BBC Two drama, United (2011), which chronicles the 1958 Munich air crash that killed eight players of Manchester United.

His next film, the theatrically released Weekender (2011), showcased the Manchester rave scene of the early 1990s. Though the film received poor reviews, O'Connell's 'dumb but sparky sidekick' was called 'a godsend' by Tim Robey of The Daily Telegraph. Similarly, the thriller Tower Block (2012), about flat tenants under attack from a sniper, received mixed reviews, but The Hollywood Reporter critic Jordan Mintzer singled out O'Connell as 'the standout [of the cast]' as the building's protection racketeer. Following his turn as a soldier in Private Peaceful (2012), an adaptation of a novel of the same name by Michael Morpurgo, he co-starred as the apprentice of a hitman played by Tim Roth in The Liability (2012), both of which met with mixed critical reception.

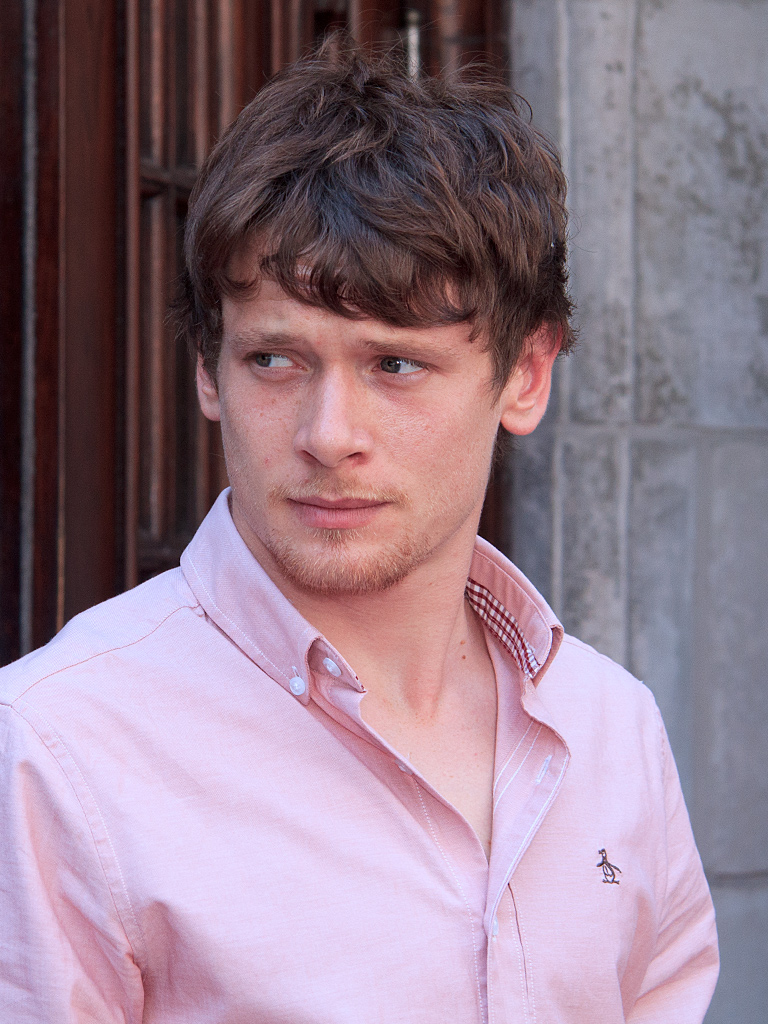
O'Connell at the Toronto International Film Festival in September 2013

O'Connell's career breakthrough came when he starred in the independent prison drama Starred Up (2013). His portrayal of a violent teenager incarcerated in the same prison as his father received widespread critical acclaim; Entertainment Weekly critic Chris Nashawaty wrote, 'O'Connell bristles with terrifying hair-trigger unpredictability. Watching him, you feel like you're witnessing the arrival of a new movie star.' Peter Travers of Rolling Stone agreed, describing his 'mad-dog incarnate' portrayal as 'a star-is-born performance.' O'Connell next starred in another acclaimed independent film, '71 (2014), portraying a soldier deployed to Belfast at the height of political violence in Northern Ireland. He was director Yann Demange's first and only choice for the part. Writing for Empire, Nev Pierce opined, 'In a superb ensemble, O'Connell is outstanding', adding, 'We know he can do violence, but here he holds the screen with no swagger—just a simple desire to survive.' He received consecutive nominations for the British Independent Film Award for Best Actor.

Following a supporting role as an Athenian warrior in his first blockbuster, 300: Rise of an Empire (2014), O'Connell played his first leading role in a major Hollywood picture, Unbroken (2014), directed by Angelina Jolie. He portrayed Louis Zamperini, an Italian-American Olympic distance runner who, as a bombardier in the Second World War, survived a plane crash over the Pacific and was held for two years in Japanese prisoner-of-war camps. To prepare for the role, he underwent a strict diet to lose almost 30 pounds and worked with a dialect coach to mask his thick Derbyshire accent. The resulting performance was positively received; Richard Corliss of Time concluded, 'Jolie has made a grand, solid movie of the Zamperini story, but O'Connell is the part of Unbroken that was truly worth the wait.' For his work in Starred Up and Unbroken, O'Connell received the Breakthrough Award from the National Board of Review. He additionally became the tenth recipient of the publicly voted BAFTA Rising Star Award.

O'Connell then starred in the film Lady Chatterley's Lover (2022) based on the novel of the same name. In January 2023, it was announced that O'Connell was added to the cast of the Amy Winehouse biopic Back to Black (2024) and played Winehouse's husband Blake Fielder-Civil.

=== Mainstream success (2025–present) ===
In 2025, O'Connell featured as Remmick, a vampire from Gaelic Ireland, in Ryan Coogler's period horror film Sinners and Sir Lord Jimmy Crystal in 28 Years Later and its sequel 28 Years Later: The Bone Temple. His role in Sinners allowed O'Connell to engage with his childhood love of Irish dance and Irish traditional music.

In February 2025, it was announced that O'Connell was cast in the next installment in the Monsterverse franchise, Godzilla x Kong: Supernova, set for theatrical release on 26 March 2027. In March 2026, he joined the cast of A Quiet Place Part III, which is scheduled for release on 30 July 2027.

== Personal life ==
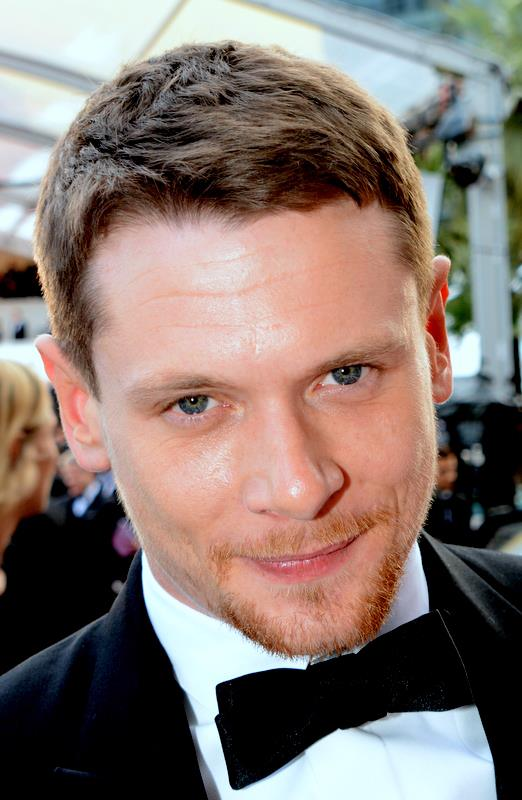
O'Connell at the 2016 Cannes Film Festival.

O'Connell lives in North London. He is in a relationship and has a daughter.

O'Connell has said that he does not consider himself British, instead identifying specifically with his Derbyshire upbringing and Irish heritage.

After his father died when O'Connell was 18, he coped in part by engaging in self-destructive behaviour, later commenting that he 'didn't stop partying for like seven years'. While living in Bristol during his tenure on Skins, he acquired a reputation in the tabloids as a 'party boy', a 'bad boy', and a 'bit of rough'. He regularly gave interviews while hungover. His childhood nickname "Jack the Lad" (a phrase meaning "a conspicuously self-assured, carefree, brash young man") is tattooed on his arm.

O'Connell's troubled youth has influenced his work, resulting in him playing mainly delinquents for the first decade of his career, while his juvenile criminal record initially prevented him from being cast in Hollywood productions as he was unable to obtain a U.S. visa. By age 24, he had largely changed his lifestyle, saying, 'I'm not trying to have the most fun I've ever had ever, anymore. That used to be the mentality every time I left the house.' He has credited Angelina Jolie, who directed him in his first Hollywood film Unbroken, with influencing his outlook and described working with her as an 'intervention'.

== Advocacy ==
On 20 June 2016, World Refugee Day, O'Connell, as well as Holliday Grainger, featured in a film from the United Nations' refugee agency UNHCR to help raise awareness of the global refugee crisis. The film, titled Home, has a family take a reverse migration into the middle of a war zone. Inspired by primary accounts of refugees, and is part of UNHCR's #WithRefugees campaign, which also includes a petition to governments to expand asylum to provide further shelter, integrating job opportunities, and education. Home, written and directed by Daniel Mulloy, went on to win a BAFTA Award and a Gold Lion at Cannes Lions International Festival of Creativity among many other awards.

== Acting credits ==
=== Film ===
Year	Title	Role	Notes
2006	This Is England	Pukey Nicholls	
2008	Eden Lake	Brett	
2009	Harry Brown	Marky	
2011	Weekender	Dylan	
2012	Tower Block	Kurtis	
2012	Private Peaceful	Charles “Charlie” Peaceful	
2012	The Liability	Adam	
2013	Starred Up	Eric Love	
2014	'71	Gary Hook	
2014	300: Rise of an Empire	Calisto	
2014	Unbroken	Louis Zamperini	
2016	Home	Jack	Short film
2016	Money Monster	Kyle Budwell	
2017	The Man with the Iron Heart	Jan Kubiš	
2017	Tulip Fever	Willem Brok	
2018	Trial by Fire	Cameron Todd Willingham	
2019	Seberg	Jack Solomon	
2019	Jungleland	Walter "Lion" Kaminski	
2020	Little Fish	Jude Williams	
2022	Lady Chatterley's Lover	Oliver Mellors	
2023	Ferrari	Peter Collins	
2024	Back to Black	Blake Fielder-Civil	
2025	Sinners	Remmick	
2025	28 Years Later	Sir Lord Jimmy Crystal	Cameo
2026	28 Years Later: The Bone Temple	Sir Lord Jimmy Crystal	
2026	Ink	Larry Lamb	
2027	Godzilla x Kong: Supernova †	TBA	Post-productionon
2027	A Quiet Place Part III †	TBA	Filming

=== Television ===
Year	Title	Role	Notes
2005	Doctors	Connor Yates	Episode: "Like Father, Like Son"
2005	The Bill	Ross Trescott	4 episodes
2007	Waterloo Road	Dale Baxter	Episode #2.9
2007	Holby City	Davey Hunt	Episode: "Trust"
2007	Wire in the Blood	Jack Norton	Episode: "The Names of Angels"
2009	Wuthering Heights	Shepherd lad	1 episode
2009–2010, 2013	Skins	James Cook	Regular: 18 episodes
2010	Dive	Robert Wisley	Television film
2011	United	Bobby Charlton	Television film
2011	The Runaway	Eamonn Docherty	6 episodes
2017	Godless	Roy Goode	Miniseries; 7 episodes
2021	The North Water	Patrick Sumner	Miniseries; 5 episodes
2022–present	SAS: Rogue Heroes	Paddy Mayne	Main cast; 12 episodes

=== Theatre ===
Year	Title	Role	Venue	Notes
2008	Scarborough	Daz	Royal Court Theatre	
2015	The Nap	Dylan Spokes	Crucible Theatre	
2017	Cat on a Hot Tin Roof	Brick	Young Vic	

== Awards and nominations ==
Year	Award	Category	Film	Result	Ref.
2008	Fright Meter Awards	Best Supporting Actor	Eden Lake	Won	
2009	Fantasporto International Fantasy Film Awards	Best Actor	Eden Lake	Won	
2010	Monte-Carlo Television Festival Golden Nymph Awards	Outstanding Actor – Drama Series	Skins	Nominated	
2010	TV Choice Awards	Best Actor	Skins	Won	
2013	British Independent Film Awards	Best Actor	Starred Up	Nominated	
2013	Les Arcs Film Festival	Best Actor	Starred Up	Won	
2014	British Academy Scotland Awards	Best Actor	Starred Up	Nominated	
2014	British Independent Film Awards	Best Actor	'71	Nominated	
2014	Chicago Film Critics Association Award	Most Promising Performer	Starred Up; Unbroken	Won	
2014	Dublin Film Critics' Circle Awards	Breakthrough	Starred Up '71; Unbroken	Won	
2014	Dublin Film Critics' Circle Awards	Best Actor	Starred Up '71	Nominated	
2014	Dublin International Film Festival Awards	Best Actor	Starred Up	Won	
2014	Hollywood Film Awards	New Hollywood	Unbroken	Won	
2014	National Board of Review Awards	Breakthrough Performance	Starred Up; Unbroken	Won	
2014	New York Film Critics Online Awards	Breakthrough Performance	Starred Up; Unbroken	Won	
2015	British Academy Film Awards	Rising Star	—N/a	Won	
2015	Empire Awards	Best Male Newcomer	Unbroken	Nominated	
2015	Dorian Awards	Rising Star	—N/a	Nominated	
2015	London Film Critics' Circle Awards	British Actor of the Year	Starred Up '71; Unbroken	Nominated	
2015	Cannes Film Festival	Trophée Chopard for Male Revelation of the Year	—N/a	Won	
2018	Critics' Choice Television Awards	Best Actor in a Movie/Miniseries	Godless	Nominated	
2024	British Independent Film Awards	Best Supporting Performance	Back to Black	Nominated	
2025	Critics' Choice Super Awards	Best Villain in a Movie	Sinners	Nominated	
2025	Fangoria Chainsaw Awards	Best Supporting Performance	Sinners	Nominated	
2025	Gotham Film Awards	Ensemble Tribute (Note: Shared with Michael B. Jordan, Hailee Steinfeld, Miles Caton, Wunmi Mosaku, Jayme Lawson, Omar Benson Miller, Buddy Guy, Li Jun Li, and Delroy Lindo)	Sinners	Won	
2025	Seattle Film Critics Society	Villain of the Year	Sinners	Nominated	
2026	Actor Awards	Outstanding Performance by a Cast in a Motion Picture (Note: Shared with Michael B. Jordan, Hailee Steinfeld, Miles Caton, Wunmi Mosaku, Jayme Lawson, Omar Benson Miller, Buddy Guy, and Delroy Lindo)	Sinners	Won	
2026	Newport Beach Film Festival	Artist of Distinction	Sinners	Won	
2026	Astra Midseason Movie Awards	Best Supporting Actor	28 Years Later: The Bone Temple	Nominated	
2026	Critics' Choice Super Awards	Best Actor in a Horror Movie	28 Years Later: The Bone Temple	Nominated	
2026	Middleburg Film Festival	Spotlight Actor Award	Ink	Won	
2026	Montclair Film Festival	Performer Award	Ink	Won	
