= Better Things =

Better Things may refer to:

== Film and television ==
- Better Things (film), a 2008 British film by Duane Hopkins
- Better Things (TV series), a 2016–2022 American comedy-drama series

== Songs ==
- "Better Things" (Aespa song), 2023
- "Better Things" (The Kinks song), 1981
- "Better Things", by Halie, which represented Missouri in the American Song Contest, 2022
- "Better Things", by Jaden from The Sunset Tapes: A Cool Tape Story, 2018
- "Better Things", by Massive Attack from Protection, 1994
- "Better Things", by Memphis May Fire from This Light I Hold, 2016
- "Better Things", by Sharon Jones and the Dap Kings from the album I Learned the Hard Way, 2010
