= Baby (2010 film) =

- Directed by: Daniel Mulloy
- Written by: Daniel Mulloy
- Produced by: Ohna Falby
- Starring: Arta Dobroshi; Daniel Kaluuya; Josef Altin
- Cinematography: Lol Crawley
- Edited by: Dan Robinson
- Production company: Sister Films
- Distributed by: Film Four
- Release date: 19 January 2010 (Sundance Film Festival)
- Running time: 26 minutes
- Country: United Kingdom
- Languages: English & Bosnian

Baby is a Brixton set drama short film, written and directed by Daniel Mulloy and starring Arta Dobroshi, Daniel Kaluuya and Josef Altin. Baby premiered at the Sundance Film Festival and went on to win multiple awards including the coveted British Independent Film Award.

== Premise ==
A young woman (Arta Dobroshi) witnesses another woman being robbed, on a bustling London street. She watches and realizing no one else will intervene the young woman tries to stop the mugging. She bravely confronts the thief (Daniel Kaluuya) only to find that he follows her home. As their journeys continue each is revealed to be struggling with their own issues of pain and intimacy.

== Development ==
Baby is Daniel Mulloy's follow up to his highly successful trilogy of short films that include BAFTA Award winning Antonio's Breakfast, European Film Award Nominee Dad and Slamdance Film Festival Grand Jury winner Son.

Baby was commission by Film Four and the British Film Institute as the last in their successful Cinema Extreme short film strand.

The film was based on an event Mulloy witnessed:

I walked to the bus stop, comfortable in my own world. I was in this routine when I saw a woman being pick-pocketed. I interrupted the thief and it turned out to be a crew working together - they pulled out knives. I wanted to put the character of Sara into a similar scenario and see how power can shift.

== Reception ==
Baby premiered at the 2010 Sundance Film Festival, to international critical acclaim and in the UK it went on to win the 2010 Edinburgh Film Festival and the British Independent Film Awards. The film received positive critical acclaim; Filmmaker wrote that the film "will haunt you well after its final frame goes dark."

Baby was ranked third most successful international short film in the world for the year 2011 by Short Film Magazine.

== Accolades ==
- premiered Sundance Film Festival 2010
- Best Short Film British Independent Film Awards
- Golden Dragon for Best Director Kraków Film Festival
- Grand Jury Award Edinburgh International Film Festival
- Best Film Cork Film Festival
- Best International Film Flickerfest
- Festival Prize Kansas City FilmFest
- Best Short Film St. Louis International Film Festival
