= Son (2008 film) =

- Directed by: Daniel Mulloy
- Written by: Daniel Mulloy
- Produced by: Ohna Falby
- Starring: Natalie Press; James Wilson; Glenn Doherty
- Cinematography: Robbie Ryan
- Edited by: Dan Robinson
- Music by: Fanfare Ciocărlia
- Production companies: Sony & Sister Films
- Release date: 2007
- Running time: 16 minutes
- Country: United Kingdom
- Language: English

Son is a 2008 short film starring Natalie Press. Financed and commissioned by Sony Vaio it was a branded content short that would become Viao's first branded content film. It went on to win multiple awards including Best Film at Edinburgh International Film Festival and Best Film at Slamdance Film Festival, becoming both a commercial hit and critical success for Sony Vaio.

== Plot ==
A mother and son spent time in an underground theater. They work on a film production that seems slowly to consume them - but the ingenious drama turns out to keep twisting.

== Branded content ==
Sony Vaio commissioned three artists: musicians Plan B, DJ Norman Jay and filmmaker Daniel Mulloy to each create branded pieces of content for Sony Vaio.

Son was commissioned as a marketing tool for the Sony Vaio computer and actress Natalie Press was cast in the lead role. In the filmmaker's hands a narrative was created in which the relationship with Sony Vaio became more subliminal to audiences than traditional product placement.

After winning Slamdance Film Festival Son was invited to become one of the first short films to feature on YouTube's newly opened Screening Room. Son's subsequent success led YouTube to promote Son on its US home-page as a featured video.

== Trilogy ==
Son is the second in Mulloy's acclaimed trilogy Dad, Son, Baby that followed Mulloy's BAFTA winning Antonio's Breakfast and led Brandon Harris of FilmMaker to cite Mulloy as "one of the world's most well regarded short filmmakers."

The characters in Son where continued from those that initially appeared in Kraków Film Festival Golden Dragon winning Dad and would go on to be features in the British Independent Film Award winning Baby.

== Edinburgh Film Festival ==
Son won Best short Film Award at Edinburgh International Film Festival 2008 as did Mulloy's next short film Baby in 2010, making Mulloy the first director to win the world's oldest continually running film festival twice.

== Awards ==
- Alpinale European Film Festival 2008 won Best Film Golden Unicorn
- Alpinale European Film Festival 2008 won Best Sound
- California Independent Film Festival 2008 won Golden Slate Award for Best Short Film
- Chicago International Film Festival 2008 Nominated Gold Hugo Best Short Film
- Edinburgh International Film Festival 2008 Won Best Short Film
- George Lindsey UNA Film Festival 2008 Won Best Short Film
- Lille International Short Film Festival 2008 Won Best Short Film
- Slamdance Film Festival 2008 Won Best Narrative Short
