= Simon Ellis (film director) =

British film director

- Born: Coventry, England
- Occupations: film director, screenwriter
- Website: simonellisfilms.com

Simon Ellis is a British film director.

== Films ==
Ellis' short films have received many awards, including the International Jury Prize at the Sundance Film Festival, Best Short Film at BIFA, and BAFTA and European Academy Award nominations. Working in fiction, animation, hybrid documentary and interactive, his work been presented collectively in dedicated retrospective shows at numerous international film festivals. He continues to attend festivals as either filmmaker or juror and has mentored short film directors in both the UK and overseas.

Ellis comes out of a strong tradition of regional British filmmaking. He is a very resourceful filmmaker who had embraced a DIY ethic even before digital technology made that option straightforward. Most importantly, he's an actor's director, and his ability to draw out convincing performances, often from inexperienced young actors and non-professionals, makes his films powerful, whatever the genre (Shots magazine)

Soft, commissioned by Film 4 and UK Film Council's Cinema Extreme scheme won thirty-eight festival prizes including the International Jury Prize at the Sundance Film Festival, Best Short Film at the British Independent Film Awards, and both BAFTA and European Film Awards nominations.

I came across a short film recently which blew everything else I had seen that week out of the water. After it was over, there was no question of doing anything other than lying on the sofa with a cushion on my face, whimpering in fear and paranoia. 'Soft' is shocking and violent, and ingeniously, intimately upsetting in a way I can only compare to the controversial scenes in Gaspar Noé's Irréversible. The film reminded me of an essay I read by the late Alexander Walker about Kubrick's A Clockwork Orange: that the film was not merely about violence but about something deeper, darker, more unsayable: a fear of our children, and older people's fear and hatred of the young. (Peter Bradshaw, The Guardian)

The films Telling Lies and Soft both feature on the Cinema 16 DVD collection, on 'British Short Films' and 'World Short Films', respectively. Alongside short films by Ridley Scott, Christopher Nolan, Guillermo del Toro, Mike Leigh, Lynne Ramsay and many others, Ellis is the only director to feature twice in the series.

== Music videos ==
In a major collaboration with UK beatboxing champion and loop pedal artist The Petebox, Ellis directed a video for every track from the album Future Loops for an innovative dual CD/DVD album campaign. Each video is a single-take documentary of the actual live recordings, initially released virally in chronological album order via YouTube, amassing millions of views. He has also directed two environmental binaural recording documentaries with Swimming.

== Commercial work ==
The multi-narrative, interactive anti-knife crime campaign films Choose a Different Ending and Who Killed Deon, which won 60+ awards collectively, including several golds and the inaugural Grand Prix for Good at the Cannes Lions, plus golds at the Clio Awards, and the British Television Advertising Awards. Ellis was bestowed with the Young Director Award for Best European Web Film for Choose a Different Ending and Who Killed Deon was ranked 'most awarded TV campaign in the world' by Campaign magazine in January 2012.

In these days of violence and shocking gornography, it's hard to be sickened by anything on TV – but when the stabbed guy realises he's dying (if you choose that option), my stomach turned. Great filming, great acting, great work. (Noel Bussey, Campaign)

The success of these campaigns saw Ellis direct further short films in single-take format for both the Scottish Police Federation and the National Police of Ukraine.

== Selected filmography ==
- Ostrich Theory (2020)
- As Dead As It Gets (2020)
- World War Cup (2016)
- Stew & Punch (2013)
- Jam Today (2011)
- Soft (2006)
- What The (2004)
- What about the Bodies (2002)
- 10 Again (2002)
- Bass Invaders (2001)
- Telling Lies (2000)
- Thousand (1998)
