= Natalie Press =

English actress (born 1980)

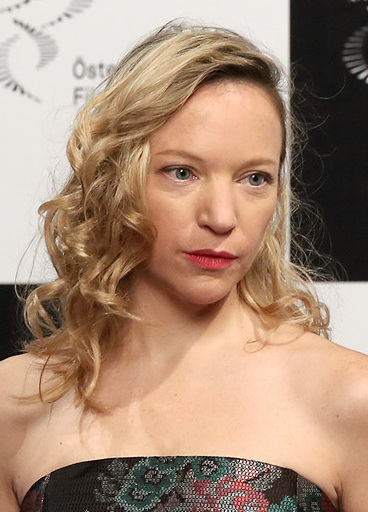
- Press in 2014
- Born: 15 August 1980 (age 45); London, England
- Occupation: Actress
- Years active: 2001–present

Natalie Press (born 15 August 1980) is an English actress. She is known for her performance in the 2004 film My Summer of Love and a number of short and feature-length independent films, including Wasp (2003), which won the Academy Award for Best Live Action Short Film. In 2008, her performance in Fifty Dead Men Walking earned her a nomination for the Independent Spirit Award for Best Supporting Female. In 2010, she was nominated for the BAFTA TV Award for Best Actress for her work in the three-hour BBC miniseries Five Daughters.

== Early life ==
Press is from north London. After studying Fine Art at university, she worked as an office temp and as a video store clerk on Fulham Road until the success of My Summer of Love.

== Career ==
Press' first credited screen role was in a 2001 episode of the BBC television series Holby City. Her film debut and first lead role was in the short film Wasp (2003), which went on to win the Academy Award for best short film in 2005. She was recognised by the London Film Critics Circle and the Evening Standard British Film Awards for her work in My Summer of Love (2004) and nominated for a European Film Award in the category of Best European actress the same year. She made her professional stage debut in The Weather, a new play by Clare Pollard, performed as part of the Royal Court Theatre's 2004 Young Playwrights Season. In 2005, Press appeared as Caddy Turveydrop (née Jellyby) in the acclaimed BBC serialisation of Dickens' Bleak House. Also in 2005 she appeared in the BBC television drama Mr. Harvey Lights a Candle.

In 2006, Press starred in Josh Appignanesi's feature film Song of Songs, which won a commendation in the Michael Powell Award for best British film 2005 at the Edinburgh festival. Later that year she also starred in the same director's short film Ex Memoria - produced by Oscar-winning producer Mia Bays - a film about a woman with Alzheimer's disease. Press starred as the young version of the character Eva. The short was nominated in the category of Best UK short at the British Independent Film Awards.

In 2006 Press appeared in Red Road (also by Andrea Arnold, the director of Wasp) (the first film in the proposed Advance Party trilogy) which won the Jury Prize at the 2006 Cannes Film Festival and in the two-part drama series Damage which was broadcast on Irish television. In the same year she won the Glamour magazine award for best newcomer in association with Nokia.

Press appeared in the short film Son (2008) by BAFTA winner Daniel Mulloy, which went on to win a slew of international awards including Best British Short Film at the Edinburgh International Film Festival in the UK. She also starred in Inseparable opposite Benedict Cumberbatch, and in In Transit, a World War II drama set in Russia which also features John Malkovich.

On 8 March 2007, Press performed in an Art Plus drama fundraising event at the Whitechapel Art Gallery opposite Rhys Ifans, Martine McCutcheon and Samantha Morton. In 2007 she was, alongside Cecilia Dean and Helena Christensen, one of the new faces of the Japanese clothing label Uniqlo and featured in the music video for Turin Brakes' single "Stalker". She made her radio debut in October 2007 in the BBC Radio play Wes Bell by Matthew Broughton.

In 2010 she was nominated for Independent Spirit Award for Best Supporting Female for her film Fifty Dead Men Walking.

Press worked on period love story Where I Belong (2014) in the leading role of Rosemarie, starring opposite Johannes Krisch.

== Filmography ==
=== Film ===
Year	Title	Role	Notes
2003	The Gathering	Female Van Pusher	
2003	Spiritual Rampage		Short film
2003	Wasp	Zoë	Short film Stockholm Film Festival: Honorable Mention
2004	Mercy	Alison	Short film
2004	My Summer of Love	Mona	Evening Standard British Film Award for Most Promising Newcomer (shared with Emily Blunt); London Film Critics Circle Award for British Newcomer of the Year; Motovun Film Festival: Special Mention (shared with Emily Blunt); Nominated—British Independent Film Award for Best Actress; Nominated—European Film Award for Best Actress; Nominated—London Film Critics Circle Award for British Actress of the Year
2005	Chromophobia	Fiona	
2005	Animal	Pregnant Woman	
2005	Song of Songs	Ruth Cohen	
2005	The Undertaker	Young Woman	Short film
2006	Ex Memoria	Young Eva Lipschitz	Short film
2006	Red Road	April	
2007	Inseparable	Jean	Short film
2007	Nightwatching	Marieke	
2007	Son	Mother	Short film
2008	In Transit	Zina	
2008	Cass	Elaine	
2008	The End	Sarah	Short film
2008	Fifty Dead Men Walking	Lara	Nominated—Independent Spirit Award for Best Supporting Female
2009	Knife Edge	Emma	
2010	The Pit	Rosie	Short film
2010	Just Before Dawn	Chloe	Short film
2010	Donkeys	April Hayley	
2011	Island	Nikki Black	
2012	Ill Manors	Katya	
2014	Where I Belong	Rosemarie	
2015	Suffragette	Emily Davison	
2017	The Rules for Everything	Agnes	

=== Television ===
Year	Title	Role	Notes
2001	Holby City	Claire Bradley	Episode: "Mother Knows Best"
2002	Is Harry on the Boat?	Piggy	Episode: "1.2"
2003	Peter in Paradise	Maria	TV movie
2004	Silent Witness	Nicola Butler	Episode: "Death by Water: Part 1"; Episode: "Death by Water: Part 2"
2004	Outlaws	Laura	Episode: "Sins of the Father"
2004	Lie with Me	Sheena Cast	TV movie
2005	Mr. Harvey Lights a Candle	Helen Taylor	TV movie
2005	Bleak House	Caddy Turveydrop	TV miniseries
2007	Damage	Emma Cahill	TV movie Nominated—Monte-Carlo Television Festival: Television Films - Best Performance by an Actress
2010	Five Daughters	Paula Clennell	TV miniseries Nominated—BAFTA TV Award for Best Actress; Nominated—Royal Television Society Award for Best Actor (Female)
2011	The Jury II	Lucy Cartwright	5 episodes
