= Amber Agar =

English actress

- Born: Amber Aga; 1976 (age 49–50); Hampstead, London, England
- Occupation: Actress
- Years active: 2002–present

Amber Agha, also credited as Amber Agar or Amber Aga, is an English actress, best known for her role in the British television series Murder City and her supporting role in Shakespeare & Hathaway: Private Investigators.

== Early life ==
Agar lived in Africa as a child, but returned to England for her education at Francis Holland School. She obtained a law degree at the University of Cambridge, and afterwards trained at RADA.

== Acting ==
Agar has performed at the National Theatre in The Man of Mode as Harriet, alongside Tom Hardy and Hayley Atwell. Other stage work includes the Orange Tree Theatre, Soho Theatre, Riverside Studios with Ed Stoppard, and Hampstead Theatre.

She played Dr Anvar "Annie" Parvez in the television series Murder City. She appeared as a guest artist (twice) in Holby City, on EastEnders, Totally Frank, Green Wing, Doctors and The Bill.

In 2009 WhatsOnStage named her as one of the "exciting young actors" of 2009 for her portrayal of Marian in Clare Bayley's The Container at the Young Vic directed by Tom Wright, with Abhin Galeya and Doreene Blackstock. Also in 2009 she appeared as campaigner Yasmin Khan in This Much is True at Theatre503, directed by Tim Roseman and written by Paul Unwin, and also featuring Justine Waddell and Gerald Kyd. The show was based on first hand accounts of the Jean Charles de Menezes case, including testimony heard for the first time.

In 2010 she appeared in Lewis; with Brenda Fricker in a special episode of Casualty; and in a lead guest role in the penultimate episode of Waking The Dead (aired early in 2011). In 2011 she started rehearsals for Reading Hebron at the Orange Tree Theatre.

She appeared as Detective Inspector Christina Marlowe in the first two series of Shakespeare & Hathaway: Private Investigators in 2018 and 2019.

== Writing ==
She has been a published poet for Arrival Press and Pyramid Press for a number of years. She was the Winner of The Times International Poetry Competition at university. In 2010 her collection In the Arms of Lyra was published as an ebook and paperback.

== Producing ==
Agar is producer for her company Cheeky Maggot Productions CMP, showcasing new writing at the Hampstead Theatre, Soho Theatre, the Royal Academy of Dramatic Art, the Lost Festival (winning entry), and the Cockpit Theatre. The company has worked with prominent actors including Ewen Macintosh and Lucy Davenport.

== Filmography ==
=== Film ===
Year	Title	Role	Notes
2005	Song of Songs	Tanya	

=== Television ===
Year	Title	Role	Notes
2002	Feedback	Journalist	
2004	Green Wing	Nurse	Episode: "Emergency"
2004	EastEnders	Ms. Ibrahim	2 episodes
2004	Holby City	Nadia Ahmed	Episode: "The Eleventh Commandment"
2004	Doctors	PC Verma	Episode: "Testimony"
2004–2006	Murder City	Dr. Anvar 'Annie' Parvez	Series regular
2005	Totally Frank	Louisa	Episode: "Ladylove"
2005	Broken News	Laura Berthould	Miniseries
2006	The Bill	Sabirah Hossien	Episode: "A Different Type of Threat"
2007	Holby City	Jane Reeves	Episode: "Can't Buy Me Love"
2008	A Touch of Frost	Susan Hepworth	Episode: "Mind Games"
2009	Law & Order: UK	Elena Adani	Episode: "Unsafe"
2010	Casualty	Jemma Blundy	Episode: "Nice and Easy Does It"
2011	Waking the Dead	Nazeem Ahmed	Episode: "Conviction"
2011	Lewis	DC Karen Middleton	Episode: "Wild Justice"
2013	The Tunnel	TV News Journalist	1 episode
2015	Holby City	Milly Renwick	Episode: "Infallible"
2016	Doctors	Alice Chaykin	Episode: "The Gooseberry"
2016	Silent Witness	Sabeen Malik	Episode: "Flight: Part 1"
2016	Agatha Raisin	Daisy Jones	Episode: "Witch of Wyckhadden"
2017	Absentia	Agent Ericsson	Recurring role
2017	Bounty Hunters	DI Suleiman	Recurring role
2018	Midsomer Murders	Emani Taylor	Episode: "The Ghost of Causton Abbey"
2018	Casualty	DC Vic	1 episode
2018–2019	Shakespeare & Hathaway: Private Investigators	DI Marlowe	Series regular
2018–2020	There She Goes	Katrina	Recurring role
2020	Cobra	D.I. Hope	2 episodes
2020	Trying	Zareen	2 episodes
2020	The Salisbury Poisonings	DI Lata Mishra	Series regular
