= Song of Songs (2005 film) =

Songs of Songs
- Directed by: Josh Appignanesi
- Written by: Josh Appignanesi; Jay Basu
- Produced by: Gayle Griffiths
- Starring: Natalie Press; Joel Chalfen; Julia Swift; Leon Lissek; Amber Agar
- Narrated by: Ramin Gray
- Cinematography: Nanu Segal
- Edited by: Nicolas Chaudeurge
- Music by: John Roome
- Production company: Wild Horses Film Company
- Release date: 2005
- Running time: 81 minutes
- Country: United Kingdom
- Languages: English; Hebrew

Song of Songs is a 2005 film directed by Josh Appignanesi and written by Josh Appignanesi and Jay Basu. It stars Natalie Press and Joel Chalfen. Press plays a devoutly orthodox Jewish young woman who tries to bring her estranged, secular brother back into the fold.

Made in the UK, it was released there in February 2006 after winning a special commendation for Best British Film at the Edinburgh International Film Festival 2005 and a nomination for the Tiger Awards at the International Film Festival Rotterdam (2006). The film was produced by Gayle Griffiths who won the Alfred Dunhill UK Talent Film Award at the London Film Festival 2005 for the production.
