= Dokufest =

Documentary film festival in Prizren, Kosovo

DokuFest - International Documentary and Short Film Festival

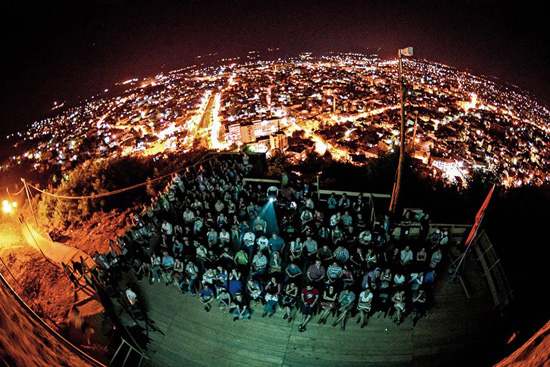
- Kino Kalaja
- Location: Prizren, Kosovo
- Founded: 2002
- Awards: Stone Award
- Directors: Linda Llulla-Gashi
- Producers: Alba Çakalli
- Artistic director: Veton Nurkollari
- Website: Official website

DokuFest is an international documentary and short film festival held in the Kosovo city of Prizren, held annually during early August. It was founded in 2002 by a group of friends. It has since grown into a cultural event that attracts international and regional artists and audiences. Films are screened throughout the eight-day festival and accompanied by programs, activities, and workshops.

In 2022, DokuFest became a nominating film festival for the European Film Awards in two categories, short film and documentary film.

== Background ==
DokuFest was established as a volunteer-based organization in 2002 with almost no funding at the beginning and continues to draw support from the community and agencies within Kosovo. However, its path has often been associated with major difficulties due to the unique context that organization operated in (such as the post-war situation, lack of similar referent events, lack of trust from institutions and potential donors etc.).

It was run by volunteers until the introduction of full-time and part-time contracts came into place in 2008 and led to the employment of a small number of staff. The need for an organizational structure arose when the organization became involved in implementation of yearly-based projects, in addition to organizing the festival. This led to the establishment of a core team that took over the design, planning and implementation of many initiatives resulting in successful implementation of several projects.

As well as organizing large-scale cultural events, DokuFest also concerns culture, education and activism for sound cultural policies and alternative education system in Kosovo.

Per a 2015 GAP Institute report, roughly 14,000-15,000 visitors from across the world went to Prizren during DokuFest (increasing from 2011's estimate of 10,000 visitors), bringing the festival's economic impact up to over 4.7 million euros.

Today, DokuFest is also a non-governmental organization which works to help foster media literacy through film across Kosovo, in addition to its duties as a festival.

== Program structure ==
The festival that includes the screening of films in seven improvised cinemas in the city of Prizren, the photographic exhibition "DokuPhoto", Workshops, master classes and debates, amongst others.

- Film training initiative called "Human Rights Film Factory - Stories from Kosovo’s Margins" that includes series of workshops for filmmakers, production of six documentaries on Human Rights coupled with series of human rights debates throughout Kosovo.
- Promotion of Human Rights and Democratic Values through Film that includes usage of human rights documentary films as educational tools and establishment of Kino Clubs in Highs Schools as well as Documentary film school guiding high school students from Kosovo throughout the process of transforming their film ideas into a finished documentary.
- Travelling Cinema “Cinema at Your Door” aiming at documentary film screenings in rural areas of Prizren region coupled with discussions focusing on the difficulties that rural communities experience in their everyday life and the lack of the cultural activities in their surroundings.
- Part of larger NGO network working actively on environmental related issues and promotion of renewables in Kosovo.
- Active participation and contribution on national and regional networks, aimed at development of sound cultural policies and organization of debates with relevant stakeholders, both in Kosovo and the region.

The festival's creative director is one of its founding members, Veton Nurkollari.

== Cinema experience ==
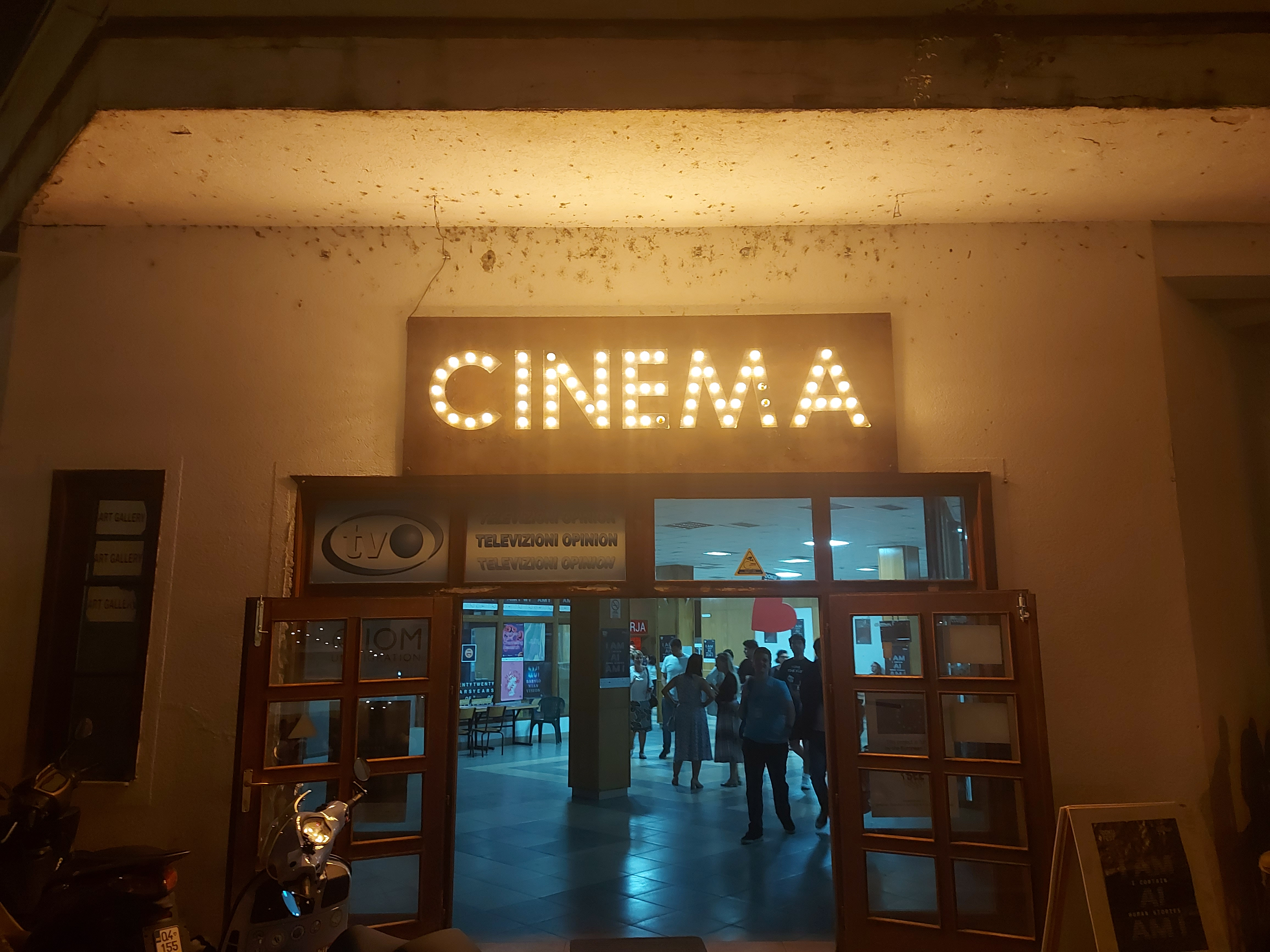
DokuKino, DokuFest's native movie theater

The festival's roots lie at Prizren's oldest cinema Lumbardhi Cinema, where its first edition was held. DokuFest continues to hold a strong relationship with the cinema's parent NGO Lumbardhi Foundation as the host of its two primary venues, Lumbardhi Indoor (used during the day) and Lumbardhi Outdoor (used during the night, known as "Lumbardhi Bahçe"), the two venues as of 2026 have been closed for restoration.

DokuFest also uses its native cinema DokuKino (located at the Europa Complex, next to the festival headquarters) with an indoor and outdoor silver screen known as Kino Plato.

Multiple spots of cultural and historical significance across Prizren are used as makeshift venues. These include: River Cinema (Kino Lumi) built on a platform directly over the Lumbardhi river; Sonar Cinema built on a platform just outside the Prizren Fortress and Lunar Cinema built inside the Fortress, often also the venue for musical acts (in 2026 the Fortress was closed for restoration); and Kino Klubi, a film club/pub near the Remzi Ademaj High School, often the venue for talks.

== Festival sections ==
=== DokuNights ===
DokuFest brings top international and local music acts to perform at DokuNights every year. DokuNights has become Kosovo's premiere music event featuring international and local singers, bands and DJs past performances have including acts such as PJ Harvey. It is regularly held at the Andrra Stage in the Marash Park.

=== DokuTech ===
Runs simultaneous to DokuFest and concentrates on technical innovation and creativity.

=== DokuFest Productions ===
DokuFest was awarded the British Academy Film Award for Home in 2017.

=== DokuKids ===
A program of films and workshops designed especially for young guests.

== Theme and slogan ==
Every year the festival is programmed and created around a theme that forges a unique annual identity.

Year	Theme	Slogan	Artist/Designer
2011	10 (X)		DokuFest
2012	Punk Protest	Punk Protest Prizren	Bardhi Haliti
2013	Borders	You Brake Mine, I'll Brake Yours	Daniel Mulloy
2014	Change	Don't Hide	Daniel Mulloy
2015	Migration	But We Do Not Have Wings To Fly Free	Daniel Mulloy
2016	Corruption		Daniel Mulloy
2017	Future	Is Not Dead	DokuFest
2018	Reflection	I'll Be Your Mirror / Come As You Are	DokuFest
2019	Truth	Truth Lies Here	DokuFest
2020	Transmission	Transmission, Transmission, Transformation	DokuFest
2021	Twenty Years	Re:set Re:mix Re:act	DokuFest
2022	Survival	How To Survive...?	DokuFest
2023	I Am AI Am I	I Contain Human Stories	DokuFest
2024	New Order		Rrethi
2025	Endless Greed Mental Void		DokuFest
2026	Twenty-Five for Twenty-Five	Show Up or It Doesn't Count!	DokuFest

== Awards ==
DokuFest presents awards across a number of competition sections, whose names and scope have changed somewhat over the festival's history.

- Best National Competition
- Best International Feature Documentary
- Best International Short Documentary
- Best International Shorts
- Best Balkan Dox
- Best Human Rights
- Best Green
- Audience Award
- Best Procredit EKO Video

== Winners ==
=== Best National Competition ===
Year	Film	Director
2012	Portreti i Humbur	Lulzim Zeqiri
2013	Guri në Breg (The Stone on the Shore)	Jonada Jashari
2014	Heshtje (Silence)	Bekim Guri
2015	Të Pafajshmit	Amir Vitija
2017	Sans le Kosovo (Pa Kosovë)	Dea Gjinovci
2018	Waiting	Laura Kajtazi-Testa
2019	Zgjedhe Një Emër (Pick a Name)	Dritëro Mehmetaj
2020	She Asked Me Where I Was From	Aulona Fetahaj
2021	A Child	Bekim Gurri
2022	Ka Me Kalu	Flonja Kodheli
2023	Prishtinë, 2002	Trëndelina Halili
2024	Like a Sick Yellow	Norika Sefa
2025	SOS	Anita Morina
2026	Searching for Poetry	Lorin Terezi

=== Best Balkan Dox ===
Year	Film	Director
2012	Letter to Dad	Srđan Keča
2013	When I Was a Boy I Was a Girl	Ivana Todorović
2014	Evaporating Borders	Iva Radivojević
2015	Flotel Europa	Vladimir Tomić
2018	Distant Constellation	Shevaun Mizrahi
2019	Timebox	Nora Agapi
2020	Once Upon a Youth	Ivan Ramljak
2021	Reconciliation	Marija Zidar
2022	Factory to the Workers	Srđan Kovačević
2023	Drifting	Somnur Vardar
2024	Another Day	Eneos Çarka
2025	A Strange Colour of Dream	Yasemin Akıncı
2026	As the Spring Arrives, Water Recalls the Nomads	Merve Dilşad Aladağ

=== Best Balkan Short Dox ===
Introduced in 2025.

Year	Film	Director
2025	Merging Bodies	Adrian Paci
2026	Towards Where to Breathe	Stefan Pavlović

=== Best Balkan Newcomer ===
Awarded from 2017 to 2021.

Year	Film	Director
2017	My Life Without Air	Bojana Burnać
2018	Momsy	Josip Lukić
2019	Centar	Ivan Marković
2020	not held (online edition)	
2021	Rampart	Marko Grba Singh

=== Best International Feature Dox ===
Year	Film	Director
2012	People I Could Have Been and Maybe Am	Boris Gerrets
2013	Belleville Baby	Mia Engberg
2014	Domino Effect	Elwira Niewiera & Piotr Rosołowski
2015	Machine Gun or Typewriter?	Travis Wilkerson
2018	Meteors	Gürcan Keltek
2019	Present.Perfect.	Shengze Zhu
2020	The Metamorphosis of Birds	Catarina Vasconcelos
2021	We	Alice Diop
2022	Dry Ground Burning	Adirley Queirós & Joana Pimenta
2023	Hypermoon	Mia Engberg
2024	A Fidai Film	Kamal Aljafari
2025	Action Item	Paula Ďurinová
2026	From Dawn to Dawn	Xisi Sofia Ye Chen

=== Best International Short Dox ===
Year	Film	Director
2012	Out of Reach	Jakub Stożek
2013	Belleville Baby	Mia Engberg
2014	Emergency Calls	Hannes Vartiainen & Pekka Veikkolainen
2015	Things	Ben Rivers
2018	Aliens	Luis López Carrasco
2019	Wild Berries	Hedda Bednarszky & Marianna Vas
2020	Tender	
2021	The Rifleman	Sierra Pettengill
2022	Haulout	Evgenia Arbugaeva & Maxim Arbugaev
2023	Pacific Club	Valentin Noujaïm
2024	History Is Written at Night	Alejandro Alonso Estrella
2025	We Were the Scenery	Christopher Radcliff
2026	Normal Planet	Ekiem Barbier, Guilhem Causse & Quentin L'helgoualc'h

=== Best International Shorts ===
Year	Film	Director
2012	Gardfrend	Cüneyt Karaahmetoğlu
2013	A Society	Jens Assur
2014	Subtotal	Gunhild Enger
2015	Listen	Hamy Ramezan & Rungano Nyoni
2018	Fence	Lendita Zeqiraj
2019	Brotherhood	Meryam Joobeur
2020	Sun Dog	Dorian Jespers
2021	The Criminals	Serhat Karaaslan
2022	Will My Parents Come to See Me	Mo Harawe
2023	Neighbour Abdi	Douwe Dijkstra
2024	The Death of a Hero	Karin Franz Körlöf
2025	Blue Heart	Samuel Suffren
2026	Kleptomania	Jingkai Qu

=== Best Human Rights Dox ===
Year	Film	Director
2012	You Don't Like the Truth: 4 Days Inside Guantánamo	Luc Côté & Patricio Henríquez
2013	Dance of Outlaws	Mohamed El Aboudi
2014	Judgment in Hungary	Eszter Hajdú
2015	Democrats	Camilla Nielsson
2018	A Woman Captured	Bernadett Tuza-Ritter
2019	Tiny Souls	Dina Naser
2020	The Earth Is Blue as an Orange	Iryna Tsilyk
2021	Our Memory Belongs to Us	Rami Farah & Signe Byrge Sørensen
2022	Myanmar Diaries	The Myanmar Film Collective
2023	A Golden Life	Boubacar Sangaré
2024	Silence of Reason	Kumjana Novakova
2025	My Dear Theo	Alisa Kovalenko
2026	The Clearing	Sabine Groenewegen

=== Best Green Dox ===
Year	Film	Director
2012	Kingdom of Coal	Antoneta Kastrati
2013	Future My Love	Maja Borg
2014	Metamorphosen	Sebastian Mez
2015	Virunga	Orlando von Einsiedel
2018	Wild Relatives	Jumana Manna
2019	Earth	Nikolaus Geyrhalter
2020	Smog Town	Meng Han
2021	White on White	Viera Čákanyová
2022	Foragers	Jumana Manna
2023	Last Things	Deborah Stratman
2024	Apple Cider Vinegar	Sofie Benoot
2025	Shifting Baselines	Julien Elie
2026	Krakatoa	Carlos Casas

=== Best Truth Dox ===
Introduced in 2020.

Year	Film	Director
2020	Collective	Alexander Nanau
2021	Writing with Fire	Rintu Thomas & Sushmit Ghosh
2022	The Killing of a Journalist	Matt Sarnecki
2023	Total Trust	Jialing Zhang
2024	23 Mile	Mitch McCabe

=== Audience Award ===
Year	Film	Director
2012	The Black Power Mixtape 1967–1975	Göran Hugo Olsson
2013	Kolona	Ujkan Hysaj
2014	Përqafimi (The Hug)	Lulzim Guhelli
2015	Remake, Remix, Rip-Off	Cem Kaya
2019	The Reformist – A Female Imam	Marie Skovgaard
2021	The Driver	Valter Lucaj
2022	Love, Deutschmarks & Death	Cem Kaya
2023	Snajka: Diary of Expectations	Tea Vidović Dalipi
2024	Afterwar	Birgitte Stærmose
2025	Palace of Youth	Maddie Gwin
2026	The Beauty of the Donkey	Dea Gjinovci

=== Distribution Award ===
Awarded to a film from the National Competition.

Year	Film	Director
2017	Routine	Bekim Guri
2018	Evidence	Lum Radoniqi
2021	The Driver	Valter Lucaj
2022	Shpija	Flaka Kokolli
2023	Hana e Re	Jehona Berisha
2024	reMemBer2.human	Durim Klaiqi
2025	Ndera	Endrit Qarolli
2026	Dance	Hana Bucalija

=== Talent Doc Award ===
Given by the Kosovo Cinematography Center (QKK).

Year	Film	Director
2023	The Future Is Better, Comrade	Blerta Haziraj
2024	Workers' Wings	Ilir Hasanaj

=== Best PROCREDIT EKO VIDEO ===
Discontinued after 2015.

Year	Film(s)	Director(s)
2013	Paradox (and others)	Trim Kasemi
2014	A Day of Clear Weather (and others)	Odeta Çunaj & Alketa Ramaj
2015	Je Polic i Vetvetes (and others)	Albulena Veliu

=== Other awards ===
Additional prizes have been introduced in various years, including the Le Fresnoy Award (2023, The Future Is Better, Comrade by Blerta Haziraj), the New Wave Grant (2022, Transmission by Flutura Balaj; 2023, projects by Aurela Berila and Flaka Kokolli), the Best Youth Film award (introduced 2025, Coexistence My Ass by Amber Fares), and DokuFest's annual candidate for the European Film Award for Best Short Film (2022, Memoir of a Veering Storm by Sofia Georgovassili; 2023, Daydreaming So Vividly About Our Spanish Holidays by Christian Avilés; 2024, The Death of a Hero by Karin Franz Körlöf; 2025, Masterpiece Mommy by Dorothy Sing Zhang; 2026, Tarik by Adem Tutić).

At the 25th edition in 2026, the juries also gave special mentions in several categories: The Thing to Be Done by Srđan Kovačević (Balkan Feature Dox), A City in the Forest by Lev Omelchenko and Nolan Huber (Human Rights Dox), and Venezia Diorama by Nicolas Piret (International Shorts).

In 2023, as a guest festival, DokuFest also hosted the Doc Alliance Award: Best Feature went to Death of a City (João Rosas, special mention Disturbed Earth by Kumjana Novakova & Guillermo Carreras-Candi), and Best Short went to The Cervix Pass (Marie Bottois).

== Acclaim ==
In 2010 DokuFest was voted as one of the 25 best international documentary festivals.
