= Digital Shorts (UK Film Council funding scheme) =

The Digital Shorts scheme supported by UK Film Council's New Cinema Fund and is partnered with organisations in each region and nation of the UK to enable filmmakers to make innovative shorts using digital technology.

== Notable short films ==
- Rhubarb and Roses (2002)
- Bouncer (2002)
- The End and Back Again (2002)
- The Apology line (2007)
- Man in a cat (2010)

== The nine agencies ==
- Screen East (East of England)
- EM Media (East Midlands)
- Film London (Greater London)
- Northern Film and Media (North East England)
- North West Vision (North West England)
- Screen South (South East England)
- South West Screen (South West England)
- Screen West Midlands (West Midlands)
- Screen Yorkshire (Yorkshire and the Humber)
