= Boris Gerrets =

Dutch film director, film writer and editor

- Born: 1948; Amsterdam, Netherlands
- Died: 26 March 2020 (aged 71–72); Berlin, Germany
- Awards: Laureate of the Aster Award 2014; Visions du Réel 2011 Best Direction Mid-Length Documentary; Beldocs 2011 International Federation of Film Critics Award; Festival dei popoli 2011 Best Ethno-Anthropological Film; IDFA 2010 Best Mid-Length Documentary Award
- Website: www.borisgerrets.org

Boris Gerrets (1948–2020) was a Dutch film director, film writer and editor based in Berlin, Germany. He was born into a Bulgarian-German family in Amsterdam and was raised in The Netherlands, Spain, Sierra Leone and Germany.

Gerrets is the recipient of the 2013 Prins Bernhard Cultuurfonds for his contribution to the documentary genre.^{[1]} He was the 2014 Laureate of the Aster Award, a prize he received for ‘high achievements in European and world film art’.^{[2]}

== Career ==
Gerrets came into prominence with his film, People I Could Have Been and Maybe Am (2010), which won twelve international awards: IDFA Best Mid-Length Doc Award, Amsterdam, 2010^{[3]}; Visions du Réel ^{[4]}, Best Direction Mid-Length Doc, Nyon, 2011; Hot Docs Canadian International Documentary Festival, Honourable Mention for Mid-Length Documentary, Toronto, Ontario, Canada, 2011; Beldocs, International Federation Of Film Critics Award (FIPRESCI), Belgrade, Serbia, 2011; Open City, The London Documentary Festival, Time Out Best City Film Award, London, United Kingdom, 2011; Pärnu Documentary Film Festival^{[5]}, Most Innovative Documentary, Estonia, 2011; Dokufest, Best International Feature Documentary, Prizren, Kosovo, 2011; A Man's Shadow Film Festival, Audience Award^{[6]}, Pwêêdi Wiimîâ, 2011; Festival dei popoli, Best Ethno-Anthropological Film, Florence, 2011; E-dox festival, E-DOX Jury Award, Kaunas, Lithuania, 2011; ZagrebDox, My Generation Award, Zagreb, Croatia, 2012; and Taiwan International Documentary Film Festival, Grand Prize^{[7]} International Mid-length & Short, Taipei, 2012.

This is an excerpt from the Visions Du Réel jury statement about Gerrets’ film:
A loving relationship and a proper distance between a director and his characters makes possible a sensitive and accurate social portrait of souls adrift without ever placing us as a voyeur, however profoundly intimate the story that unfolds before us. The portable phone, a tool gadget becomes the ideal camera and the director’s play of shadows and lights reveal a poetry of survival and melancholy until the very climax of the reggae blues at the end of the movie^{[8]}.

His recent film, Shado’man (2014) was awarded the 2014 AVANCA Television Prize^{[9]}. The Hollywood Reporter wrote, ‘At once stylish and gritty, this is a solid, serious and promisingly distinctive feature-length debut’^{[10]}, veteran film journalist Jennifer Merin described it as ‘a dramatic documentary that, despite its darkness, illuminates the dignity of his subjects’^{[11]} while Open Democracy states that ‘Director Boris Gerrets demonstrates that dignity and humanity can exist even in the most seemingly undignified and inhumane living conditions’^{[12]}.

Gerrets has conducted Master Classes in Film at Escuela Internacional de Cine y Televisión Cuba, EICTV^{[13]} (2013), EDN Seoul, Korea (2011) and Centro de Capacitación Cinematográfica Mexico City, (CCC)^{[14]} (2011). He was the tutor for the IDFA-Mediafonds Workshop^{[15]} ^{[16]} in 2014 and 2015; and was the external examiner and mentor for the master's degree Programme in Film at the Netherlands Film and Television Academy, Amsterdam in 2014. Gerrets was among the filmmakers who were asked to contribute to the 2014 documentary survey conducted by Sight and Sound^{[17]} and has been a member of the jury at Visions du Réel, Nyon (2012) and IDFA, Amsterdam (2011).

== Accolades ==
2013 Prins Bernhard Cultuurfonds, The Netherlands
2014 Laureate of the Aster Award, Macedonia

== Awards ==
=== People I Could Have Been And Maybe Am ===
- International Documentary Festival, Amsterdam (IDFA), NTR IDFA Award For Best Mid-Length Documentary, Amsterdam, the Netherlands, 2010
- Visions du Réel, Best Direction For Mid-Length Documentary (Prix George Foundation), Nyon, Switzerland, 2011
- Hot Docs, Honourable Mention for Mid-Length Documentary, Toronto, Ontario, Canada, 2011
- Beldocs, International Federation Of Film Critics Award (FIPRESCI), Belgrade, Serbia, 2011
- Open City Documentary Festival, Time Out Best City Film Award, London, United Kingdom, 2011
- Pärnu Documentary Film Festival, Most Innovative Documentary, Pärnu, Estonia, 2011
- Dokufest, Best International Feature Documentary, Prizren, Kosovo, 2011
- Festival International du Cinéma des Peuples, Audience Award, Pwêêdi Wiimîâ, New Caledonia, 2011
- 52nd Festival dei Popoli, Best Ethno-Anthropological Film (Targa Gianpaolo Paoli), Florence, Italy, 2011
- E-dox festival, E-DOX Jury Award, Lithuania, 2011
- ZagrebDox, My Generation Award, Zagreb, Croatia, 2012
- Taiwan International Documentary Festival, Grand Prize International Mid-length & Short, Taipei, Taiwan, 2012

=== Shado’man ===
- Festival de Cinema de Avanca, AVANCA Television Prize, Avanca, Portugal (2014)

== Nominations ==
- Netherlands Film Festival, Golden Calf Nomination for Best Short Documentary, Utrecht, The Netherlands, 2011 (People I Could Have Been and Maybe Am)
- Taiwan International Documentary Festival, International Competition, Tapei, Taiwan, 2014 (Shado'man)

== Filmography ==
2004 Garden Stories
2006 Driving Dreams/Droomrijders
2010 People I Could Have Been and Maybe Am
2014 Shado’man
2020 Lamentations of Judas

== Moving Image ==
1987 Pompeii
1997 Invisible
1997 ZERO
1994 Time/Piece
1998 Das Land Wo die Zitronen Blühen
1999 Souvenirs Entomologiques
2003 Go No Go
2003 D’Aprés le Sacre
2002 Critical Utopians
