= John Hegarty (advertising executive) =

British advertising executive and founder of Bartle Bogle Hegarty (born 1944)

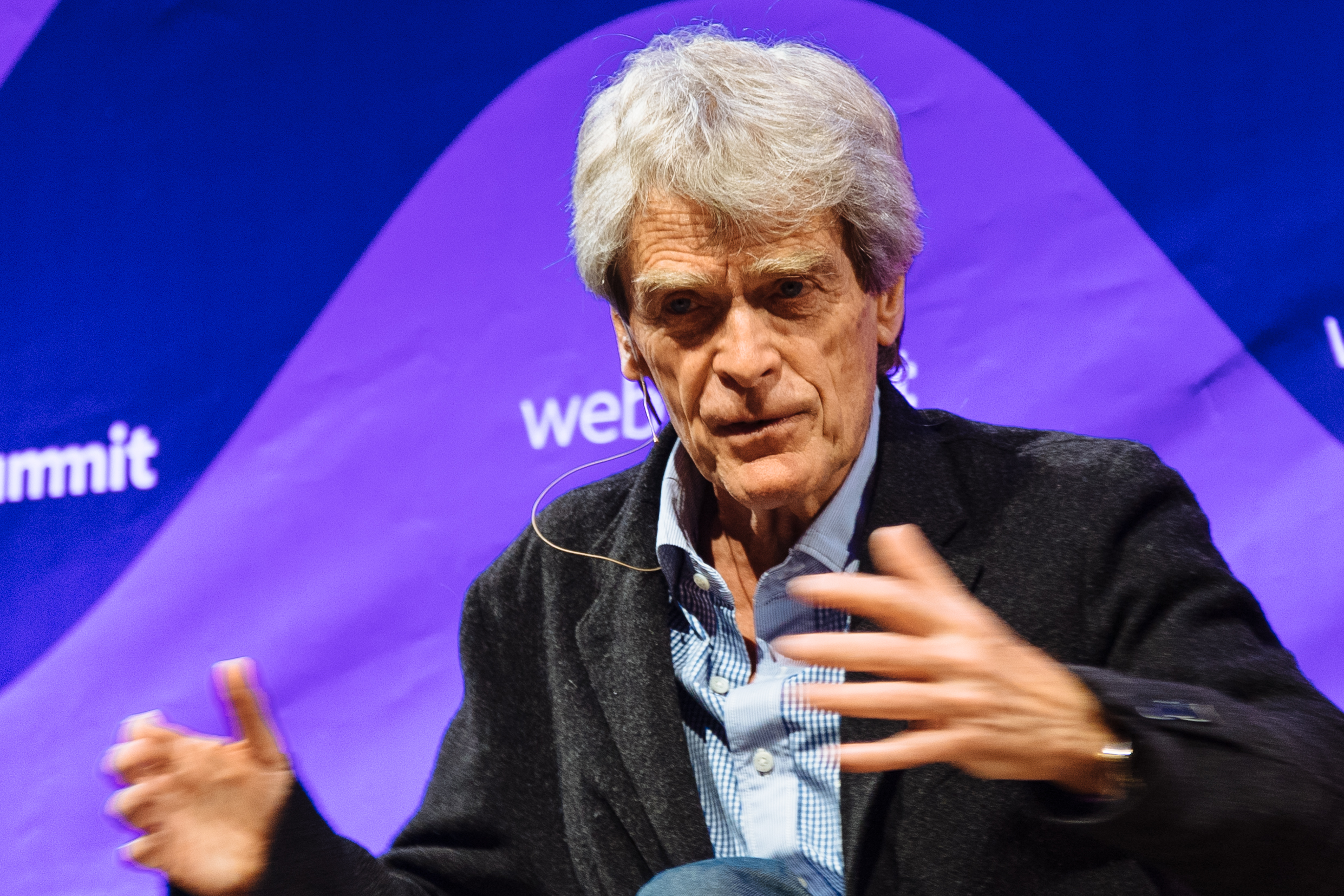
John Hegarty at Web Summit 2017

Sir John Hegarty (born 1944) is an advertising executive and a founder of the agency Bartle Bogle Hegarty.

== Education ==
Hegarty was educated at the Challoner Secondary School (now Finchley Catholic High School following merger with the Primary and Grammar Schools in 1971), in the North London suburb of North Finchley, followed by the London College of Printing (now London College of Communication).

== Career ==
He joined Cramer Saatchi in 1967, and was a founding shareholder when it became Saatchi & Saatchi. In 1973, he co-founded the London office of TBWA, and then in 1982 started Bartle Bogle Hegarty.

He has published two books: Hegarty on Advertising: Turning Intelligence into Magic and Hegarty on Creativity: There are No Rules.

== Honours ==
He was a President of D&AD in 1989 and in 1994 was given the President's Award. He appeared as a castaway on the BBC Radio programme Desert Island Discs on 23 June 1991.

He was knighted for his services to the advertising and creative industries in 2007.

Hegarty is a Trustee Emeritus of The Design Museum.

== Bibliography ==
- —— (2011). Hegarty on Advertising: Turning Intelligence into Magic. Thames & Hudson. ISBN 978-0500515563.
- —— (2014). Hegarty on Creativity: There are No Rules. Thames & Hudson. ISBN 978-0500517246.
