= Native Son (2010 film) =

- Sean Harris as "John" in Native Son
- Directed by: Scott Graham
- Written by: Scott Graham
- Produced by: Cinema Extreme; David Smith of Brocken Spectre; Film 4
- Starring: Sean Harris; Agnieszka Bresler; Kirsty Strain; Barrie Hunter; Tony Bradford; Kate Dickie; Leo Horsfield
- Cinematography: Yoliswa Gärtig
- Edited by: Rachel Tunnard
- Music by: Sons and Daughters
- Release date: 15 May 2010 (France)
- Running time: 19 minutes
- Country: United Kingdom
- Language: English
- Budget: $50,000

Native Son is a 2010 drama film by Scottish director Scott Graham, based on an original screenplay. The film stars Sean Harris, Agnieszka Bresler, Kirsty Strain, Barrie Hunter and Leo Horsfield.

== Plot ==
John, played by Sean Harris, lives in a remote area of Scotland. The primary industry is potato farming and John is a picker who lives for the harvests; it is his outlet and all he has in his life. He yearns for contact, but is so self-conscious that he comes across as awkward and skittish. His other outlet is watching people who live a life that he does not know how to make for himself, a life of home and family. John does not know how to act when a female co-worker shows interest in him. John exhibits all the signs of someone who has suffered untold tragedies in his life.

While driving back to town on a dark and isolated road, John comes upon a car stopped up ahead. He immediately sees a hose attached to the exhaust pipe. He has come upon a suicide by carbon monoxide and tries to help, but the woman is already dead. Suddenly, headlights appear in the opposite direction and John’s immediate reaction is to hide the body, though he has done nothing wrong. John is like one who feels blame for every event, even those for which there is no blame. That decision leads John to take the body of the dead young woman to a shed in the woods. Now John finds the intimacy and physical contact he so desperately craves.

Early the next morning, John is awakened to hear the sounds of police combing the woods calling his name. He has overslept. He quickly throws on some clothes and begins to run through the woods, but townspeople have now taken up the search for John. He runs at first, but he suddenly gives up trying to escape his pursuers and turns to face them, looking skyward. The townspeople have found him first. He knows his fate, and the townspeople club him before the police arrive.

In his final moments, the policewoman who first comes upon John touches his head to examine his wounds and strokes his wounded forehead as he dies from the clubbing.

== Cast ==
- Sean Harris
- Agnieszka Bresler at IMDb, as Anna
- Kirsty Strain, as the dead woman
- Barrie Hunter at IMDb
- Tony Bradford at IMDb
- Kate Dickie
- Leo Horsfield at IMDb, as young field worker

== Production ==
- Cinema Extreme
- David Smith of Brocken Spectre
- Film 4

=== Filming ===
The filming of Native Son was completed in 5 days and was filmed in Annan, Scotland. The film premiered at the Cannes Film Festival during the week of 5 July 2010. and screened at the 2010 Palm Springs ShortFest.

=== Screenplay ===
Director and screenwriter, Scott Graham, said that the subject of necrophilia was not written for the shock of a real paraphilia. It is about loneliness. Scott Graham came up with the idea for the screen play when he had to move from Scotland to Amsterdam, the Netherlands for an extended period while filming another film. His own feelings of isolation and his feelings of disconnection, while away from home, provided the inspiration for the screenplay.
