= Murder City (TV series) =

- Genre: Crime drama
- Created by: Robert Murphy
- Written by: Robert Murphy; Stephen Plaice; Danny Miller
- Directed by: Richard Spence; Ashley Pearce; Ian Knox
- Starring: Amanda Donohoe; Kris Marshall; Connor McIntyre; Laura Main; Tim Woodward; Amber Agar; Geff Francis; Alexis Conran
- Composer: Mark Russell
- Country of origin: United Kingdom
- Original language: English
- No. of series: 2
- No. of episodes: 10

Production
- Executive producers: Andy Harries; Francis Hopkinson
- Producers: Mark Hudson; David Boulter; Tony Dennis
- Running time: 90 minutes
- Production company: Granada Television

Original release
- Network: ITV
- Release: 18 March 2004 – 26 April 2006

Murder City is a British crime drama series produced by Granada Television, first broadcast on 18 March 2004 on ITV, that focuses on two mismatched detectives, DI Susan Alembic (Amanda Donohoe) and DS Luke Stone (Kris Marshall), who scour London solving complex cases. The first series consisted of six episodes. A second and final series of four episodes was subsequently commissioned and began broadcast on 5 April 2006. Following declining viewership, a third series of Murder City was not commissioned. BBC America began airing the complete series on 17 August 2006, and it was subsequently released in a Region 1 four-disc DVD box set by Image Entertainment on 14 August 2007.

== Characterisation ==
Whilst the premise of the show features a murder squad investigating complex cases in and around London, the drama created is centered around the realignment of character team-ups. Although DI Susan Alembic (Amanda Donohoe) and DS Luke Stone (Kris Marshall) are the lead characters and partners, writer Robert Murphy frequently separates them at the beginning of each episode by providing them with individual cases to solve. While Alembic is typically partnered with DI Adrian Dumfries (Geff Francis), Dumfries also possessed his own cases, which the episodes followed.

Additionally, character personality alignment frequently varies. Episodes switch between either Stone and Alembic uniting against Dumfries's personality or Dumfries and Alembic agreeing to discourage Stone's theories. However, one episode shows all three sharing a laugh to the chagrin of DCI Sebastian Turner (Tim Woodward). Despite showing the personality failures of each character, the series does not overtly lampoon any character or favour one crime-solving style over another. Both the 'out of the box' and the 'by the book' characters contribute to the solution of their individual cases through their unique approaches.

== Cast ==
- Amanda Donohoe – DI Susan Alembic
- Kris Marshall – DS Luke Stone
- Laura Main – DC Alison Bain
- Tim Woodward – DCI Sebastian Turner
- Amber Agar – Dr Annie Parvez
- Connor McIntyre – DC Frank Craven
- Alexis Conran – Dr Simon Dunne
- Geff Francis – DI Adrian Dumfries (Series 1)
- Tim Dantay – DC Bruce Simner (Series 1)

== Characters ==
=== Main characters ===
DI Susan Alembic is possibly one of the more talented DIs in her department, and she partners with the arguably less experienced Luke Stone. Alembic is shown in a very professional respect, with very few references to her personal life. In "Happy Families", it is revealed that Alembic is married with a child, while in "Mr. Right", Alembic chastises Stone for his inability to balance his personal and work lives. Although by the book, Alembic frequently solves the cases she encounters. During the second series, Alembic's character shifted slightly externally, from the professional business-suited exterior of the first series to a more business casual attire constituting jeans and T-shirts. Additionally, despite the hints of a solid marriage and congenial parent-child relationship in the first series, the possibility of her husband's infidelity is hinted at during "Wives and Lovers".

DS Luke Stone is initially used to provide comic relief in the first series and is viewed as impetuous by Dumfries and Turner owing to his outrageous theories. Stone typically provides ironclad evidence for use against suspects. Dumfries refers to him as Alembic's "monkey", and Turner punishes him by assigning him to lone cases. Stone appears as the eccentric genius loner and frames him as a type of wild cannon. Despite a strong connection with Alembic, he avoids long-term relationships and romantically interacting with women outside of sexual liaisons. A recurring joke surrounds his inability to remember the names of his departmental conquests and his difficulty in dealing with Dr. Parvez. In "Mr. Right", he becomes obsessed with a female murder victim. Alembic confronts his overdedication to the job, lack of emotional commitment, and usage of the job as a secondary home. However, Stone's 'inspiration' assists him in solving the perfect crime. And his fascination with the 'throwaway' case in episode two brings to light the murder of a murderer.

=== Other characters ===
DC Alison Bain is a very keen, ambitious young detective who holds a passion for finding clues to fit the puzzle. Crafted and taught by Alembic, Bain has a certain tact about her which overshadows Stone's rather upfront and senseless style. Often highlighted by Turner as a well-crafted sergeant of the future, Bain has worked her way up the ranks quickly and has found herself on the murder squad after just three years in the job. The team appear to work well with her, especially Dumfries, who quite often assigns her to clean-up after Stone.

DI Adrian Dumfries serves as the male counterpart of Alembic and her competitor. Although his race added diversity to the cast, his character portrayed a 'head boy' personality. He alternates between partnering with Alembic or competing against her for control of cases while barely disguising his disregard for Stone. Despite his grandstanding, he often contributes to the solution of the mystery. In "Happy Families", he assists Turner in shifting partial financial responsibility for an out-of-control budget onto the DCI from a competing precinct. Additionally, in "Mr. Right", he separates a violent wholesaler from his family. However, for the final two episodes, his character's case contributions diminished. At the end of episode five, he cedes Alembic the crown and steps back from competing with her for case control. In "Nothing Sacred", his character's ego was heavily featured, as it became clear that he cared less about listening to a suspect than attempting to win the 'case-solver' of the week prize offered by Turner.

DC Frank Craven is more of a "get up and let's 'ave him" kind of cop, not afraid to push himself amongst the action and get involved when he is required to. Frank is regularly partnered with Stone, and the pair seem to have a good working relationship. Craven was initially designed to feature in a minor role, assisting Stone with the mathematical equations in "The Critical Path". However, after Tim Dantay left the series, Craven's role was heavily increased, with scenes for "The Critical Path" re-filmed and the scripts for the remaining three episodes re-written to replace Simner with Craven. Craven does not appear in "Happy Families" or "Mr. Right", despite these being midway through the first series, however this was due to the episodes being broadcast out of initial production order.

DC Bruce Simner is a calm and collected individual, who has a passion for being thorough and a confidence when following the rulebook. A star in Turner's eyes, as he was handpicked for the murder squad for an unblemished record as a serving officer, and from past recommendation from his former colleagues. Simner only appears in "Happy Families" and "Mr. Right", as these were the first two episodes to be filmed, after which Dantay left the role due to personal circumstances and was replaced by Connor McIntyre. As the episodes were not broadcast in the order filmed, the opening titles where adjusted twice to accommodate Dantay's arrival and departure.

DCI Sebastian Turner is a very brash, say what you see style cop, who seems to have his mind set further on clean-up rates and budgets than actually caring whether he catches the killer or not. He quietly oversees the covert competition between his two lead inspectors, Alembic and Dumfries, although regularly shows his despise for Stone, often labeling him as Alembic's "monkey". In the second series, Turner interacts increasingly with his team and is quite often seen out in the field assisting with various investigations.

Dr. Annie Parvez is a coroner in the same department as Alembic and Stone. Although attracted to Stone, the recurring theme includes her grudge against him when he did not call her after a date. As a favour, Stone sets up Annie with fellow doctor Simon Dunne, labeling them as the 'Posh and Becks' of pathology. However, after they hit it off after the first date, Stone finds himself becoming increasingly jealous, a fact which Annie is clearly aware of and plays upon to her advantage. Annie deals more with the physical side of pathology, performing post mortems and collecting evidence for the labs to test. In the second series, her role within the team is expanded by using her as a criminal profiler.

Dr. Simon Dunne is a forensic pathologist in the same department as Annie. Simon works more in the computing side of pathology, analyzing evidence and collating it to create patterns to identify a suspect or suspects. Simon finds himself attracted to Annie, and after a little help from Stone, manages to hit it off with her after taking her on a date. Stone and Simon begin to form a bond, and Simon regularly fast-tracks evidence and results in order to aid Stone's investigations and put him in Turner's good books.

== Episode list ==
=== Series 1 (2004) ===
No.	Title	Directed by	Written by	Original release date	Viewers (millions)
1	"The Critical Path"	Sam Miller	Robert Murphy	18 March 2004	6.01
DI Alembic investigates the disappearance and suspected murder of sixteen-year-old Grace Gilmartin, but interference from American psychic Calvin Moran infuriates DS Stone, who is quick to disprove Moran's theories, and in the process, get himself thrown off the case. DI Dumfries pairs with Alembic as Moran leads the detectives to a body buried in nearby woods, which is soon identified as Grace's biological father. Meanwhile, Stone and DC Craven investigate the murder of an inner city oil trader who was murdered at his desk, with the killer managing to evade being captured on CCTV. Stone uses mathematical reasoning to identify a 'critical path' - a sequence which occurs once every seventeen hours which allowed for the killer to enter the building, kill the victim and escape unseen.
2	"Under the Skin"	Ashley Pearce	Robert Murphy	25 March 2004	4.70
The discovery of a skull buried on a construction site intrigues DS Stone, but DI Alembic quickly re-assigns him to another case, in which an eighty-year-old is stabbed to death shortly after her own birthday party. Stone's usual efforts to be tactful and sensitive fall by the wayside, as he arrests a family relative without strong evidence, and soon finds himself being thrown off the case. DCI Turner assigns him to the discovery of the skull, and as he attempts to uncover its identity, he finds himself investigating a senior police officer whom he accuses of tampering with evidence. As the victims of a serial killer known as the 'Commercial Row' killer are re-investigated, Stone finds himself up against an ever-increasing tangled web of lies, deceit, murder and nonsensical evidence.
3	"Happy Families"	Richard Spence	Robert Murphy	1 April 2004	5.59
The discovery of a dismembered body at a local rubbish dump leads DI Alembic and DS Stone on the trail to uncover the victim's identity. As they discover that the body is that of language-school owner Victoria Symmonds, the detectives struggle to find a motive for murder, until shoeboxes containing £35,000 in cash are found underneath her bed. Further investigation leads Stone to believe that Symmonds was a major player in the baby trade market, using contact information gathered by her sister, and using her brother-in-law as a handler. Meanwhile, DCI Turner comes face to face with an old friend, Superintendent Boyle of Essex police, while DI Dumfries and DC Bain find themselves on a wild goose chase, following the trail of a second arm found at the rubbish dump during the search.
4	"Mr. Right"	Richard Spence	Stephen Plaice	8 April 2004	5.87
The murder of Karen Harteson and Alan Scoby in a hotel bedroom proves to be a complex investigation for DI Alembic and DS Stone, with Stone convinced that Karen was the target, but Alembic convinced otherwise. As Alembic and DI Dumfries investigate possible suspects with Scoby being the target, they find themselves slap-bang in the middle of an upcoming murder trial, which sees Scoby as the key witness. With DCI Turner convinced that Scoby was the intended victim, he orders Stone to stay well away from the Karen Harteson line of enquiry. However, Stone has no intention of giving up, and presents his evidence to Alembic, who orders him to stick with it. As Stone uses his intuition to build a group of suspects, Dumfries and Alembic's investigation comes to a grinding halt.
5	"Big City, Small World"	Ashley Pearce	Robert Murphy	15 April 2004	5.39
A drive-by shooting in a packed high street, which leaves two dead and five injured, springs a surprise when DS Stone discovers that one of the supposed victims was already dead before he was shot. As DI Dumfries investigates a possible turf war between the Turks and the Kurds, DI Alembic and DS Stone investigate the murder of the second victim. After discovering that he was also poisoned, as well as being beaten and suffering a heart attack before he was shot, the number of suspects begins to increase rapidly. The trail leads straight to Ken Hill, a local fitness guru and part-time dealer. However, during a tussle with DS Stone, Hill himself dies of a seizure caused by poisoning. Alembic is convinced she can nail her prime suspect, but DCI Turner warns her to stay well away.
6	"Nothing Sacred"	Sam Miller	Robert Murphy	22 April 2004	4.11
DI Alembic and DS Stone investigate the murder of an art trader, who is found in the boot of his car, having been dumped in the river. As Stone attempts to identify a motive for murder, he comes a little too close to a key witness and finds the line between love and professionalism slowly merging. Meanwhile, DI Dumfries is ecstatic when he arrives at the scene of a murder, only to find the killer standing over the body. However, a post-mortem reveals the deceased died of natural causes, and Dumfries becomes the butt of the joke. However, DC Craven uses Dumfries' suspect to help re-create a vital piece of evidence in the art trader's murder. As Stone edges ever closer to the truth, he discovers that secrets surrounding a 500,000-year-old text changing hands may be the motive for murder.

=== Series 2 (2006) ===
No.	Title	Directed by	Written by	Original release date	Viewers (millions)
1	"Wives and Lovers"	Richard Spence	Robert Murphy	5 April 2006	4.85
The murder of Jackie Aston, a married woman with a penchant for extra-marital affairs, puzzles the team. DI Alembic goes undercover to try and obtain information from the prime suspect, while DS Stone and DC Bain trawl the evidence in an attempt to uncover clues which could point to the killer's identity. Stone is convinced that a second man found dead at the scene, who died after the dead woman's body was thrown onto him from the top floor of a tower block, is the intended victim after all. With Susan working on the basis that Jackie's murder was the catalyst rather than the weapon, the case is thrown on its head when the fiancé of the second victim reveals that she has been stalked by a family friend, who also knows and associates with Susan's prime suspect, since she was a teenager.
2	"Just Seventeen"	Ian Knox	Robert Murphy	12 April 2006	5.18
The team are divided to investigate two separate cases. DI Alembic and DC Craven investigate the execution of Vernon Duffy, who was tied to a tree and shot in a game of Russian roulette. DS Stone and DC Bain investigate the suspected suicide of a schoolgirl which turns out to be a very carefully planned and executed murder. The two cases soon interlink when the prime suspect in Stone's case turns out to be one of the twelve people involved in Duffy's execution – which soon gives him a cast-iron alibi. Determined to nail all twelve suspects involved, a clue provided by a young witness in Stone's case leads Alembic to discover that it was none other than Duffy's jury at his rape trial which staged his execution. Meanwhile, Stone is convinced the dead girl's best friend is her killer.
3	"Death of a Ladies' Man"	Richard Spence	Robert Murphy	19 April 2006	5.28
The team investigate two separate cases. DCs Bain and Craven investigate the murder of Greg Osborn, who is killed in a hit-and-run incident. Meanwhile, DI Alembic and DS Stone investigate the shooting of Ryan Everett, a gigolo who appeared to have been the target of someone who he owed a serious amount of money to. Everett momentarily dies in hospital, but after regaining consciousness, is able to provide little information as to who would want to kill him. During a search of a house owned by prime suspect Adam Brady in the Greg Osborn murder, DC Craven finds a gun which is later identified as the weapon used to shoot Ryan Everett. Stone and Alembic try to piece the complicated aspects of the two cases together to find out the motive for a tangled web of lies, blackmail and deceit.
4	"Game Over"	Ian Knox	Danny Miller	26 April 2006	4.80
The murder of hotel worker Alice Fleming leads the team to suspect that they are looking for a serial killer. However, the shooting of Sam Glazer overshadows the investigation, when it appears that the two seemingly unrelated cases are linked through hotel towels found in both of the victims' homes. As the team trace the scene of crime back to the Fountain hotel, suspect Nathan Wallace reveals that a third murder took place on the night, for which the team have found no body. DS Stone interviews a key witness who reveals that no third murder occurred, and that simply a joke between an actor and stuntman had taken place, which leaves Wallace's motives for murder unquestionably in doubt. But despite admitting to Alice's murder, the team are no closer to catching Sam Glazer's murderer.
