= Duane Hopkins =

British photographer and film director

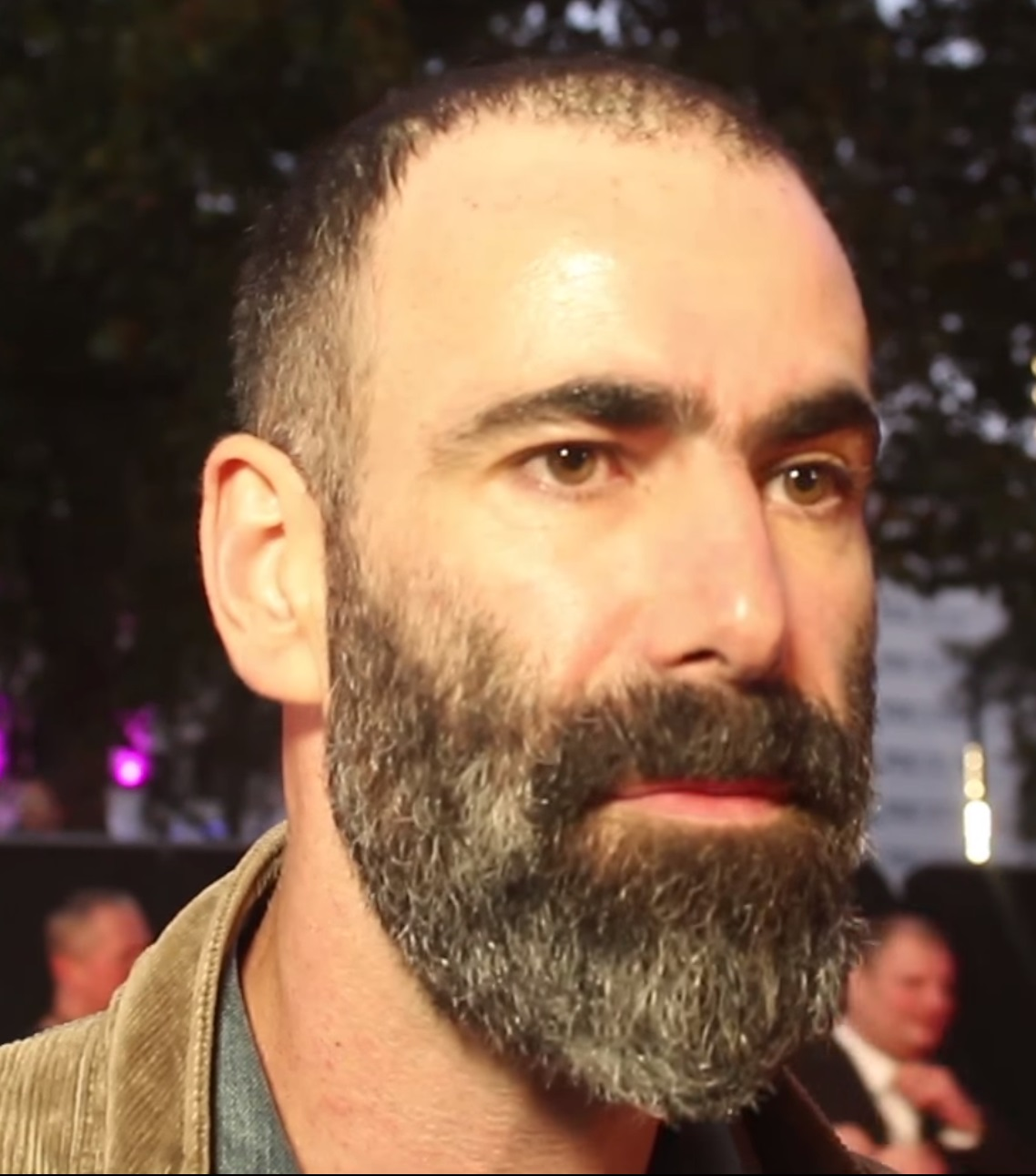
- Hopkins at the BFI London Film Festival in 2014
- Born: 22 July 1973 (age 52); Cheltenham, England
- Occupations: Film director, screenwriter, artist
- Years active: 2001 – present

Duane Hopkins (born 22 July 1973) is an English film director and artist, best known for directing the independent film Better Things (2008).

== Career ==
Hopkins' first short film, Field, made in 2001, premiered at Cannes Film Festival as part of International Critics' Week. A dark, unblinking tale of rural adolescence, Field went on to win a host of prizes at festivals internationally. Hopkins followed Field in 2003 with his second short film Love Me Or Leave Me Alone, made as part of Film 4 and UK Film Council's Cinema Extreme scheme for new British filmmaking talent. Love Me Or Leave Me Alone, 'a study in the articulations and limitations of first love', premiered at Edinburgh International Film Festival where it won Best British Short Film. Like Field it was highly successful; together the two films gathered over 30 international awards.

Hopkins then wrote and directed his debut feature film Better Things. Shot on location in the West Midlands of England, Better Things premiered at International Critics' Week in Cannes 2008, where it was nominated for the Camera D'Or. A multi-narrative tale of love, yearning and loss amongst the young and old of a small town in rural England, Better Things was widely praised by critics as a film that was both radical and nuanced. It was often noted for its use of cinematic technique and narrative approach to connect themes such as romantic need, the roots of drug addiction, and existential notions of anxiety, purposefully against a contemporary, epic rural backdrop. Variety stated: "Duane Hopkins follows his prize-winning shorts with visually distinctive first feature Better Things. Beautifully shot with cast of eye-catching non-pros… gives a special twist to UK tradition of social realism by juxtaposing the natural and the constructed." The Guardian wrote that Better Things "has a bold and brilliant insight at its heart" while The Independent argued that "Hopkins is a director with an introspective subtlety uncommon in UK filmmaking", and in choosing 'Better Things as its Film of the Month, Sight and Sound wrote "Hopkins' film depicts, or rather creates, a piece of British social landscape that we have never quite seen before". Le Monde made Better Things its film of the week, comparing Hopkins' work to "the abstract violence of Alan Clarke, and the lyrical harshness of Bill Douglas...Hopkins clearly has a lot in common with such directors: he uses a harsh metaphysical darkness and an acute sense of formal composition.".

Hopkins has been described as being at the centre of an emergent 'British New Wave' alongside directors like Steve McQueen, with Better Things distinguished "by its technical and stylistic approaches to typical problems of British realism". His film work has been noted for its precise compositions and technical rigour, and for its poetic cinematic rendering of realist subject matter, characters and environments.

Hopkins also works in the fields of photography and moving image art. His first solo gallery exhibition Sunday, a collection of single and multi-channel moving image installations, opened at the Baltic Centre for Contemporary Art in March 2009. Sunday deals with contemporary British youth and the relationships between identity, psychology and environment. The format of the individual pieces within the Sunday collection is that of multiple images knitted together to form multi-screen scenes, each working in different ways with atmosphere and narrative. The impression formed is suggestive of a social-realist fairy tale – the subtle interaction of realist, surreal and romantic tropes. With Sunday Hopkins was said to have "created an experience that is entirely separate from the conventions of sitting in a cinema. He generates a portrait of youth that has a matter of fact, harsh reality to it and a psychological intensity that is unnerving." Sunday was also exhibited at galleries in Liverpool and Yokohama in 2009.

Hopkins produces the work of other filmmakers through Third, a company co-founded with producer Samm Haillay. With Third Hopkins has produced Daniel Elliott's Venice-winning short film The Making of Parts and Berlinale-winning Jade. In 2010 he co-produced the feature film debut of the artist Gillian Wearing, titled Self Made.

== Filmography ==
- Field (2001)
- Love Me Or Leave Me Alone (2003)
- Better Things (2008)
- Bypass (2014)

== Moving Image Art ==
- Sunday (2009) (Installation Series)
