= Bypass (film) =

- Directed by: Duane Hopkins
- Screenplay by: Duane Hopkins
- Produced by: Samm Haillay
- Starring: George MacKay; Benjamin Dilloway; Charlotte Spencer
- Cinematography: David Procter
- Edited by: Chris Barwell
- Music by: Danny Bensi; Saunder Jurriaans
- Release date: 2014
- Country: United Kingdom
- Language: English

Bypass is a 2014 British thriller drama film written and directed by Duane Hopkins. It premiered at the 71st Venice International Film Festival.

== Cast ==
- George MacKay as Tim
- Benjamin Dilloway as Greg
- Charlotte Spencer as Lilly
- Donald Sumpter as Grandfather
- Matt Cross as Lester
- Anton Saunders as Fence
- Lara Peake as Helen
- Arabella Arnott as Mum
- Chanel Cresswell as Emily
- Barry Ward as the new supplier
- Nicola Stapleton as Samantha
- Adam Astill as the doctor

== Release ==
The film premiered at the 71st edition of the Venice Film Festival, in the Orizzonti sidebar. It was theatrically released in United Kingdom on 10 April 2015.

== Reception ==
On the review aggregator website Rotten Tomatoes, 44% of 9 critics' reviews are positive, with an average rating of 5.1/10. Variety described it as a "technically skilled but stylistically overwrought" film that "that remains oddly unmoving despite its surfeit of onscreen suffering". The Guardian called it a "overwrought yet convincing tale" which "hardly heads in search of fresh terrain", but "at least provides a brooding, increasingly potent spin around the familiar sights". The Hollywood Reporter described it as "a downer that could have used a few moments of levity as a breather from its artsy self-seriousness", yet "has an intensity that commands admiration".
