= Bartle Bogle Hegarty =

British global advertising agency

Bartle Bogle Hegarty (BBH)
- Industry: Advertising
- Founded: Soho, London (1982)
- Founder: John Bartle, Sir Nigel Bogle, Sir John Hegarty
- Number of locations: London, New York, Singapore, Shanghai, Mumbai, Stockholm, Dublin
- Key people: Karen Martin - CEO, Alex Grieve - Global Chief Creative Officer
- Parent: Publicis
- Website: www.bartleboglehegarty.com

Bartle Bogle Hegarty (BBH) is a British global advertising agency. Founded in 1982 by British ad men John Bartle, Nigel Bogle, and John Hegarty, BBH has offices in London, New York City, Singapore, Shanghai, Mumbai and Stockholm and employs more than 1,000 staff worldwide. The company is part of international agency group Publicis. In 2018 BBH was named the IPA Effectiveness Company of the Year.

== History ==
The agency's first ad was for Levi's and it showed a black sheep going against the herd. It became the agency icon and spawned the phrase, "when the world zigs, zag". The Levi's black sheep poster was not an easy ad to buy because at the time all jeans ads had people in them, but it proved successful.

From 1982 to 2010, BBH went on to produce many award-winning films for Levi's. "Launderette" featured Nick Kamen and was set to Marvin Gaye's recording of 'I Heard It Through the Grapevine'. Levi's sold over 2 million boxer shorts in one year. In 1991, BBH cast Brad Pitt in the Levi's commercial titled "Camera." Other classic work includes "Drugstore", "Creek", "Flatbeat" featuring Flat Eric – a small yellow puppet, "Clayman" and "Odyssey" which was directed by Jonathan Glazer. The 28-year relationship resulted in a total of seven number one singles in Europe including "Spaceman" by Babylon Zoo. They released their first US Levi’s ads in 2002.

Beyond Levi's, the company been responsible for creating long-running campaigns for other global brands, such as "Vorsprung durch Technik" for Audi which John Hegarty coined in 1984, "The Lynx Effect" for Unilever which propelled the male body spray into the number one spot globally and "Keep Walking" for Johnnie Walker which bought the brand sales up from 13% of the global market when the campaign broke in 2000, to over 20% at the end of 2013 according to IWSR.

In 1997, Leo Burnett Worldwide purchased a 49% share in BBH; that share was then held by the Publicis advertising group. In July 2012, a final 51% share in BBH previously attributed to the agency's co-founders was bought out by part-owners Publicis.

BBH has also worked with brands including Google and Absolut.

In 2006, the agency launched ZAG, a branding and venturing division and in 2014 the agency created BBH Sport, bringing BBH brand strategy and creativity to the world of sport. Also in 2006, BBT's deputy chairman Guy Murphy left the company to join JWT as global planning director.

== Labor disputes ==
On September 20, 2018, the American labor union SAG-AFTRA called a strike against Bartle Bogle Hegarty, and instructed its members not to accept work from the US agency.

In early September, BBH US announced that it had withdrawn from its SAG-AFTRA Commercials Contract, first entered into in 1999.

BBH had contended that the union's contractual terms, which do not permit the use of non-union actors and provide for compensation minimums and residuals, put the agency at a competitive disadvantage, stating that "Many of our peer agencies are not signatories."

SAG-AFTRA countered that it had added certain waivers for low-budget commercials, among other provisions, to its contract language, in response to concerns about profitability. The union also said that the strike was against BBH US only, and not other subsidiaries of the Publicis Group, including Leo Burnett and Saatchi & Saatchi, who are themselves signatories of the contract at issue.

== Awards ==
BBH has won the Queen's Award for Export twice.

John Hegarty was knighted in the 2007 Queen's Birthday Honours and Nigel Bogle was knighted in the 2013 list.

BBH has been Agency of the Year twice at the Cannes Lions International Advertising Festival, first awarded in 1993, and BBH founder Sir John Hegarty also won the first "Lion of St Mark" award.

BBH London was Campaign magazine's UK Agency of the Year in 1986, 1993, 2003, 2004, 2005, 2011 and 2012. and Creativity's "Innovators of the year" in 2014.

BBH also became Effectiveness Agency of the Year for 2008 at both the IPA and APG awards, the first agency to achieve this feat.

BBH was awarded the British Academy Film Award for Home in 2017.

BBH Singapore was awarded Ad Age's 2018 ‘International Agency of the Year’.

BBH was named Effectiveness Company of the Year at the 2018 IPA Effectiveness Awards, winning the Grand Prix for Audi alongside six other awards: a gold for Audi, three silvers for Barclays, Virgin Media and Weetabix and a bronze for IAG Cargo.

BBH has been named in the "Sunday Times 100 Best Companies to Work For", for the past 11 years and in 2019 received a three star accreditation rating.
