= Broken Spectre =

2023 video game

- Developer: Games by Stitch
- Publisher: Games by Stitch
- Engine: Unity
- Platforms: Oculus Quest; Quest 2; Steam (service); Google Play
- Release: Quest 2 June 21, 2023
- Genres: adventure game survival horror interactive story
- Mode: Single-player

Broken Spectre is a virtual reality survival horror adventure game for Oculus Quest, Oculus Quest 2, and Quest Pro, developed by Games by Stitch in partnership with the Canada Media Fund and Ontario Creates. It was released on the Oculus store on June 21, 2023. It was released on Steam on August 19, 2023.

== Gameplay ==
Broken Spectre is a cosmic horror narrative game for hand-tracking VR.

== Plot ==
In Broken Spectre players take on the role of Casey Brewer, a strong-headed adventurer haunted by her troubled family history. When Casey hears news that her father, Dr. Grant Brewer, a renowned biologist long suspected dead in the treacherous wilderness of Northwest Canada, may still be alive, she departs for Coldblood Mountain National Park to begin her search. Tracking Grant's path, Casey soon finds evidence of her father's mutated experiments and clues that lead her to higher and more dangerous elevations. As Casey ascends the mountain and slowly unravels the mystery of Grant's disappearance, she uncovers an even darker secret that threatens her entire family and the world.

== Reception ==
Prior to its release, the game received favorable preview coverage from a number of horror genre publications, including Fangoria, which called Broken Spectre "the VR haunted park adventure of your nightmares", and Bloody Disgusting, which cited the untapped potential of "cosmic horror and VR". Broken Spectre was featured in the 2023 UploadVR Summer Showcase where its release date trailer debuted and June 21, 2023, release date was exclusively announced. The game's announcement and release date trailers were also featured on video game and entertainment media website IGN and its associated YouTube channels.

Horror video game website Rely on Horror awarded Broken Spectre a 9/10 and praised the game's cosmic horror narrative, hand-tracking mechanics, and sound design, saying that it "attempts to move the genre forward" and is an experience that VR horror fans "won't want to pass up.". SVG.com also gave Broken Spectre a 9/10, praised the game's innovative hand-tracking system and stated that it set "a new standard for the genre" while pushing the boundaries of virtual reality horror.

Notable VR YouTuber A Wolf in VR published a multi-part Let's Play video series featuring Broken Spectre, praising the game's horror elements and favorably comparing it to Campo Santo's acclaimed 2016 walking simulator Firewatch.

Canadian film and television director Vincenzo Natali publicly praised Broken Spectre, saying “if H.P. Lovecraft designed a VR game it would probably be something like Broken Spectre."

== Accolades ==
Year	Award	Category	Result	Ref.
2023	Raindance Immersive	Best Immersive Game	Nominated	
2023	Haunted House Fearfest	Best Video Game	Won	
2023	AIXR XR Awards	VR Experience of the Year	Won	
