= Home (2016 British-Kosovan film) =

- Directed by: Daniel Mulloy
- Written by: Daniel Mulloy
- Produced by: Afolabi Kuti; Shpat Deda; Scott O'Donnell; Tim Nash; Chris Watling
- Starring: Jack O'Connell; Holliday Grainger; Zaki Ramadani; Tahliya Lowles
- Music by: Coldplay; Dizzee Rascal; Alexander Bălănescu; Wiley
- Production companies: Bartle Bogle Hegarty; Black Sheep Studios; Dokufest; Somesuch
- Release date: 12 March 2016 (SXSW Film Festival)
- Running time: 20 minutes
- Countries: Kosovo; United Kingdom
- Languages: English; Arabic; Macedonian

Home is a British-Kosovan drama short film about refugees. It stars Jack O'Connell and Holliday Grainger, and was written and directed by Daniel Mulloy. It was made in association with the United Nations, and was released in UK cinemas on World Refugee Day 2016. It was nominated for the European Film Academy Award and went on to win the BAFTA Award for Best Short Film.

== Plot ==
Thousands of men, women and children struggle to get into Europe as a comfortable English family leave, on what appears to be a holiday.

== Cast ==
- Jack O'Connell as Jack
- Holliday Grainger as Holly
- Tahliya Lowles as Tahliya
- Zaki Ramadani as Zac

== Production ==
Daniel Mulloy wrote the screenplay after spending time living with refugees who were facing deportation:

"We began chatting and I learned that their clothes had been donated to them by nuns and their son had just been operated on after falling ill sleeping on the floor of a Hungarian jail cell. We were in Kosovo and they were being returned to a nightmare that they had risked their lives to escape. I left them feeling sickened and disturbed. I then returned to the UK, billboards were up on streets that were overtly racist and our politicians were dehumanising those fleeing war zones, referring to them as ‘swarms’ and living in ‘jungles’. The film grew out of the fact that wanted to respond.'' Daniel Mulloy from Dazed interview by Trey Taylor

== Release ==
Home premiered at the 2016 South by Southwest and was released in cinemas across the UK.

The film received widespread acclaim. Kaleem Aftab of The Independent called it "A hypnotic tale of struggle", Matthew Whitehouse of i-D described it as "a powerful testament". Flynn Sarler of the Radio Times wrote "I feel like I have been punched in the stomach", and Cath Clarke of Time Out called the film "powerful and thought-provoking". Jasper Rees of The Telegraph described it as “a shrewd and original look at the full horror of a refugee’s plight”.

All proceeds from the film’s global screenings were donated to the United Nations #WithRefugees Coalition.

== Awards ==
- premiered South by Southwest 2016
- Winner 60th British Academy Film Awards Best Short Film 2017
- Winner Special Jury Prize Clermont-Ferrand International Short Film Festival
- Winner Best of Fest Palm Springs International Festival of Short Films
- Winner Port Townsend Film Festival
- Winner Reykjavik International Film Festival
- Winner St. Louis International Film Festival
- Winner Curtas Vila do Conde
- Winner of the GOLDEN LION Cannes Lions International Festival of Creativity
- Winner of the GOLDEN ARROW British Television Advertising Awards
