= Intrepido =

Defunct weekly comic magazine in Italy (1935–1998)

- Categories: Comic magazine
- Frequency: Weekly
- Founded: 1935
- First issue: 23 February 1935
- Final issue: January 1998
- Country: Italy
- Based in: Milan
- Language: Italian

Intrepido (Italian for "Intrepid"), also referred to as L'Intrepido, was a weekly comic magazine published by Casa Editrice Moderna between 1935 and 1998.

== History and profile ==
The first issue was published on 23 February 1935. It was the first comics magazine to publish only comics by Italian artists; a few foreign comics were introduced in 1936, before disappearing in 1939. During the first phase in its history, the magazine got a large success with a series of comics inspired to 1800s feuilleton literature. After an interruption in 1943 due to World War II, it resumed its publications in April 1945, then continuing, without interruption, until January 1998. In the 1960s the magazine enjoyed higher levels of circulation reaching 700,000 copies. During its lifetime the magazine produced more than 3,000 issues.

== See also ==
- List of magazines in Italy
