= UK Film Council =

Film promotion organisation

- Logo of the UK Film Council
- Abbreviation: UKFC
- Successor: British Film Institute
- Formation: 2000
- Dissolved: 2011
- Headquarters: London, England
- Chief Executive: John Woodward
- Chairman: Stewart Till
- Website: www.ukfilmcouncil.org.uk

The UK Film Council (UKFC) was a non-departmental public body set up in 2000 to develop and promote the film industry in the UK. It was constituted as a private company limited by guarantee, owned by the Secretary of State for Culture, Media and Sport, and governed by a board of 15 directors. It was funded from various sources including The National Lottery. John Woodward was the chief executive officer of the UKFC.

In June 2008, the company had 90 full-time members of staff. It distributed more than £160m of lottery money to over 900 films. Lord Puttnam described the council as "a layer of strategic glue that's helped bind the many parts of our disparate industry together."

On 26 July 2010, the government announced that the council would be abolished. Although one of the parties elected into that government had, for some months, promised a bonfire of the Quangos, Woodward said that the decision had been taken with "no notice and no consultation". UKFC closed on 31 March 2011, with many of its functions passing to the British Film Institute.

== Formation and leadership ==
In 1999, Alan Parker was appointed as the chairman of the Film Council, with Stewart Till as the vice-chairman. Till became chairman after Parker left.

== Objectives ==
In its own words, the aim of the UKFC was:

To stimulate a competitive, successful and vibrant UK film industry and culture, and to promote the widest possible enjoyment and understanding of cinema throughout the nations and regions of the UK.

== Activities ==
The UKFC administered and funded a range of different activities, including:

=== Filmmaking ===
The Development Fund aimed to broaden the quality, range and ambition of film projects being developed in the UK. With £12 million of Lottery funding to invest over three years, the fund aimed to build a talent-driven home for writers, directors and producers. It helped filmmakers of all experience levels develop their ideas and screenplays into viable feature films, be they fiction, documentary or animation, up until the moment they were ready to get production finance. There were two funding programmes, one for first-time feature filmmakers and one for established filmmakers. The First Feature Film Development Programme aimed to identify and support emerging filmmakers (e.g. screenwriters, writer/directors and writer, director, producer teams) who had not made a feature film or who had not yet had a feature film released theatrically or broadcast on UK television. Awards were made up to £25,000. The fund also offered Signature Awards to help further encourage ambitious and original filmmakers and projects.

Funded films included Jane Campion's Bright Star; Oscar-winning filmmaker Andrea Arnold's second feature Fish Tank; Armando Iannucci's In the Loop; and Sam Taylor Wood's Nowhere Boy, written by Matt Greenhalgh.

The New Cinema Fund supported emerging talent and established filmmakers working outside the mainstream, focusing on innovative writing and gifted directors. The fund had £15 million of Lottery money to invest over three years and funded eight to ten feature films each year. It had a commitment to supporting work from the nations and regions, from black, Asian and other minority ethnic filmmakers and encouraged the use of digital technology in the production, distribution and exhibition of films. It also supported over 100 short films each year through its short film schemes. Four flagship short film schemes operated nationwide: Cinema Extreme (administered by The Bureau); the Completion Fund (administered by Maya Vision International); The Magic Hour (administered by 104 films); and Blank Slate (administered by B3 Media). The remaining short film funding offered by the UK Film Council was administered by the regional screen agencies and the national screen agencies via the Digital Shorts Scheme and Digital Nation (formerly known as Digital Shorts Plus). Features produced by the UKFC New Cinema Fund had an average Metacritic score of over 65.

Films supported by the fund included James Marsh's Oscar-winning Man on Wire; Armando Iannucci's In the Loop (Sundance 2009); Jane Campion's Bright Star; Andrea Arnold's Fish Tank; Dominic Murphy's White Lightnin' (Berlin and Sundance Film Festivals 2009); Sally Potter's Rage (Berlin Competition 2009); Noel Clarke's Adulthood (BAFTA Rising Star); Ken Loach's The Wind That Shakes the Barley (Cannes, Palme d'Or); Shane Meadows's This is England (BAFTA, Best British Film); Kevin Macdonald's Touching the Void (BAFTA, Best British Film); Andrea Arnold's Red Road (Cannes, Jury Prize); Paul Andrew Williams's London to Brighton (Edinburgh International Film Festival, Best New Director); Alexis Dos Santos's Unmade Beds (also at Berlin and Sundance 2009); and Duane Hopkins's Better Things (Cannes, Critics' Week).

The Premiere Fund invested £8 million of Lottery funding per year into mainstream, commercially driven films encouraging the involvement of British creative talent in a range of films that attracted international audiences.

Funded films included Mike Leigh's award-winning Happy-Go-Lucky; Oliver Gerald McMorrow's Franklyn; Christopher Smith's Triangle; Oliver Parker's Dorian Gray; Stephen Frears's Cheri; Bob Weide's How to Lose Friends and Alienate People; Anand Tucker's And When Did You Last See Your Father?; Julian Jarrold's Brideshead Revisited; Oliver Parker and Barnaby Thompson's St Trinian's; Rupert Wyatt's The Escapist; Roger Michell's Venus; Vito Rocco's Faintheart; and Gabor Csupo's The Secret of Moonacre.

The Office of the British Film Commissioner worked to ensure that the UK remained an attractive production base for international films. Activities included: encouraging and supporting international films being made in the UK; strengthening the UK's production infrastructure; promoting UK talent and product around the world; working with the UK's Government to ensure that film friendly policies were in place; and reviewing and developing international co-production treaties, allowing the UK to collaborate with other countries to make films.

=== Distribution and exhibition ===
The UK Film Council's Distribution and Exhibition Department worked to make non-mainstream films more widely available to cinema audiences in the UK through the following schemes:

The Prints and Advertising Fund – provided £2 million per year to help UK distributors produce extra prints of non-mainstream or more commercially focused British films, or to publicise films more effectively through advertising and other channels.

The Cinema Access Programme (launched in 2003) – provided £350,000 to help cinemas purchase subtitling and audio-description technologies that improve the cinema-going experience for people with hearing and sight impairments. The programme also provided funds to YourLocalCinema.com, the film listings website of choice for film-goers with sensory impairments, and the Film Print Provision strand, an ongoing funding initiative that helps distributors produce fully accessible film prints.

The Digital Fund for Non Theatrical Exhibition (launched in 2004) – a £500,000 fund to help expand the activities of film clubs, societies community groups and mobile film exhibitors in order to improve viewing opportunities for audiences in rural areas across the UK that might not be able to support a full-time cinema.

The Digital Screen Network (set up in 2005 by the UK Film Council and the Arts Council England) – a £12 million investment to equip 240 screens in 210 cinemas across the UK with digital projection technology to give UK audiences much greater choice.

Capital funding – the Small Capital Fund (2006) provided £800,000 to help smaller cinemas meet the costs of essential building refurbishments and other improvements such as disabled access; and the Capital and Access Fund for Cinemas (2007) provided £500,000 to help cinemas upgrade their equipment and premises to improve the cinema-going experience for audiences.

FindAnyFilm.com' – the film search engine which told users when, where and how a film is available in the UK, legally and across all formats and platforms – cinema, TV, DVD & Blu-ray sale or rental, or download.

=== Education and training ===
The UKFC also funded:

The Skillset Film Skills Fund which ensured a supply of skilled professionals in line with market demand and aims to build a bigger and better future for the film industry in the UK. As the first-ever comprehensive training strategy for the British film industry, it was launched in September 2003.

First Light, a digital short filmmaking scheme that offered children and young people more opportunities to participate in and learn about filmmaking.

FILMCLUB, free to all state after school programmes in England, FILMCLUB opened the world of film to school children with free DVDs for screenings, visits from film professionals and an interactive website.

=== Regional and national film activity ===
The UKFC funded nine regional screen agencies via its Regional Investment Fund for England (RIFE) which provided funding for production, screen commissions, cinema exhibition, training, archives and education within each English region. These were: EM Media (East Midlands), Film London (Greater London), Northern Film & Media (North East England), North West Vision and Media, (also known as Vision+Media) (North West England), Screen East (East of England), Screen South (South East England), Screen West Midlands (West Midlands), Screen Yorkshire (Yorkshire and the Humber) and South West Screen (South West England). All of them, excluding Film London and Screen Yorkshire, were merged into Creative England as a result of the dissolution of the UKFC in 2010. It also funded three national screen agencies responsible for developing film, television and broadcast new media in other British countries: Scottish Screen (now Creative Scotland/Screen Scotland), Northern Ireland Film & Television Commission (now Northern Ireland Screen) and the Film Agency for Wales (now Ffilm Cymru Wales).

=== Film culture and history ===
The UKFC also part-funded the British Film Institute which champions moving image culture, education and cinema heritage to benefit as wide an audience as possible and aims to deepen and encourage public debate about film. The BFI was responsible for delivering that part of the UKFC's strategy "to help UK audiences enjoy the best of British and world cinema".

== Response to abolition ==
On 26 July 2010 it was announced that the council would be abolished; Actors and professionals including James McAvoy, Emily Blunt, Pete Postlethwaite, Damian Lewis, Timothy Spall, Daniel Barber and Ian Holm campaigned against the council's abolition. The move also led American actor and director Clint Eastwood (who had filmed Hereafter in London) to write to the British Chancellor of the Exchequer George Osborne in August 2010 to protest the decision to close the council. Eastwood warned Osborne that the closure could result in fewer foreign production companies choosing to work in the UK. A grass-roots online campaign was launched and a petition established by supporters of the council.

Countering this, a few professionals including Michael Winner, Julian Fellowes and Chris Atkins supported the Government's decision. A number of other organisations such as Save The British Film Industry responded positively.

At the closure of the UK Film Council on 31 March 2011, The Guardian reported that "The UKFC's entire annual budget was a reported £3m, while the cost of closing it down and restructuring is estimated to have been almost four times that amount." One of the UKFC's last films, The King's Speech, is estimated to have cost $15m to make and grossed $235m, besides winning several Academy Awards. UKFC invested $1.6m for a 34% share of net profits, a valuable stake which passed to the British Film Institute.

== See also ==
- Northern Ireland Screen
- Scottish Screen
- Creative England
- British Film Institute
