= Better Things (film) =

- Film poster
- Directed by: Duane Hopkins
- Written by: Duane Hopkins
- Produced by: Samm Haillay, Rachel Robey
- Starring: Liam McIlfatrick; Megan Palmer; Betty Bench; Frank Bench; Rachel McIntyre; Che Corr; Tara Ballard; Freddie Cunliffe; Patricia Loveland; Kurt Taylor; Michael Socha
- Cinematography: Lol Crawley
- Edited by: Chris Barwell
- Music by: Dan Berridge
- Distributed by: Celluloid Dreams, Soda Pictures (UK)
- Release dates: 17 May 2008 (Cannes Film Festival); 23 January 2009 (United Kingdom)
- Running time: 93 minutes
- Country: United Kingdom
- Language: English

Better Things is a 2008 film written and directed by Duane Hopkins. Set in present-day rural England, the film presents a multi-narrative tale following the young and old on their journeys of withdrawal and commitment to each other.

== Production ==
Hopkins began work on the screenplay for Better Things in 2003, and in 2004 was awarded the MEDIA New Talent Award for Best Screenplay by an under 35-year-old at the Cannes Film Festival. An intensive casting process then started in and around the West Midlands where the film was set. Hopkins built on the real-world casting techniques he had employed in his earlier short films, concentrating on ordinary people whose experiences were similar to those of his written characters, and whom he also found photographically compelling. As the film explores the issue of heroin addiction and the physical and emotional functions of drugs for the user, Hopkins cast several young people who themselves had been addicted to heroin. Shooting was conducted on location over 6 weeks in October and November 2006. The film was co-financed by Channel 4 and the UK Film Council.

== Release ==
Better Things premiered in the official selection of International Critics' Week at the Cannes Film Festival, May 2008.

== Critical reception ==
The critical response to Better Things was positive, with the film reviewed as Film of the Month in Sight and Sound magazine, film of the week in Le Monde, chosen as one of Film Comment Selects best films of 2009, and shortlisted for The Guardian's First Film Award 2009. It was, however, also attacked in some quarters for its supposed bleakness and unrelenting tone. Many favourable critics responded to what they found to be the film's visual beauty, and an innovative cinematic reworking of the British Social Realist form. Variety compared the film in different ways to works by American photographer Nan Goldin (particularly her The Ballad of Sexual Dependency), and the British directors Lynne Ramsay and Alan Clarke.

Other critics drew visual and thematic connections to Romanticism, noting imagery "reminiscent of Gainsborough or Constable – to grandiloquent, tempestuous shots evoking Caspar David Friedrich, and the bold style of other late Romantics". Vilhelm Hammershøi is similarly referenced, as well as "the film’s most vivid and direct quotation – that of Henry Wallis’ Chatterton". Much was made of the film's perceived stylistic innovations that moved away from the traditional British Social Realist modes of Loach or Leigh whilst still rendering avowedly realist characters and subject matter. With Better Things Hopkins was positioned as part of a 'British New Wave' of directors, alongside Steve McQueen and others, demonstrating that there was a 'new generation of British cinema coming to the boil'. This thread was later taken up in New Cinemas: Journal of Contemporary Film, with a detailed analysis of contemporary British realist cinema that used Better Things as a point of entry in discussing how 'the likes of Hopkins, Andrea Arnold and Lynne Ramsay can be seen to adopt an approach that places a greater emphasis on the poetic potentials of realist imagery at the expense of social-political didacticism'. Other critics found a strong vein of social intent in the film and emphasised its uncommon vision of life in present day rural communities; in hailing a 'steelily impressive debut' the Radio Times stated that "Duane Hopkins's first feature is a compelling and highly credible insight into the deterioration of life in rural Britain". Better Things won several awards and nominations internationally following its premiere at Cannes, including the FIPRESCI Critics Award for Best Film at Stockholm International Film Festival.

== Awards and nominations ==
- Winner: FIPRESCI (Critics') Award for Best Film, Stockholm International Film Festival 2008
- Winner: Best Cinematography, The Golden Brigg Kiev 2009
- Winner: SIGNIS Award for Best Film from World Catholic Association for Communication, Alba Film Festival 2009
- Winner: MEDIA New Talent Prize for Screenwriting 2004
- Nominated: Camera d’Or, Cannes Film Festival 2008
- Nominated: Michael Powell Award, Edinburgh International Film Festival 2008
- Nominated: Diesel Discovery Award, Toronto International Film Festival 2008
- Nominated: Finnkino Prize, Helsinki Film Festival 2008
