= Antonio's Breakfast =

- Directed by: Daniel Mulloy
- Written by: Daniel Mulloy
- Produced by: Howard Stogdon; Amber Templemore-Finlayson
- Starring: George Irving; Doreen Mantle; Dominique Chambers; Daniel Campbell; Kurt Burgess; Romell Holness; Derion Adams
- Cinematography: Robbie Ryan
- Edited by: Dan Robinson
- Production company: Sister Films
- Release date: 19 January 2006 (Sundance Film Festival)
- Running time: 16 minutes
- Country: United Kingdom
- Language: English

Antonio's Breakfast is a 2006 Brixton set drama short film written and directed by Daniel Mulloy. It premiered in Sundance Film Festival and went on to win the BAFTA Award for Best Short Film.

== Premise ==
Antonio, a young black teenager, is woken by his father's (George Irving) rasping breaths. It soon becomes clear that the young Antonio is his paralyzed father's primary care giver. As Antonio's friends arrive Antonio is forced to choose between a life lived for his father or one in which he makes his own way. His ultimate decision is one laced with uncertainty and guilt.

== Production ==
Mulloy held castings around the Brixton and Peckham areas of London. He spent a year work-shopping with the chosen young cast members, several of whom would appear in his later films. The story of Antonio's Breakfast is built around Mulloy's childhood experiences of growing up in Brixton.

"When writing, I have a strong sense of what needs to be communicated. I then work with the artists in rehearsals until they have made the performances their own. In Antonio’s Breakfast this meant that the young guys spent time working out what they thought would feel natural for them to say and I trusted them implicitly and went with it." Daniel Mulloy from Get Your Short Film Funded, Made and Seen by Tricia Tuttle

== Reception ==
Antonio's Breakfast premiered at the 2006 Sundance Film Festival to international critical acclaim and in the UK it went on to win the 2006 British Academy Award.

== Accolades ==
- premiered Sundance Film Festival 2006
- Winner 59th British Academy Film Awards Best Short Film 2006
- Winner Grand Jury Prize Aspen Shortsfest
- Winner Indianapolis
- Winner FilmFest Kansas City
- Winner Melbourne
- Winner Indianapolis
- Special Mention Jury Award Clermont-Ferrand International Short Film Festival
