= Daniel Mulloy =

British artist and filmmaker (born 1977)

- Born: 1977 (age 48–49); Brixton, London, England
- Education: University College London
- Occupations: Artist; director; screenwriter

Daniel Mulloy (born 1977) is a British artist and filmmaker.

The work of Daniel Mulloy has often been defined by both its starkness and deceptive simplicity. Tender and intimate Mulloy's short films have won over one hundred international festival awards. According to Filmmaker magazine, Mulloy "is one of the world's most well regarded short filmmakers."

He has won four BAFTAs, two of which are British Academy Film Awards, a BIFA and received two nominations for the European Film Academy Award. He received the British Academy Film Award for his films Antonio's Breakfast and Home and received the British Independent Film Award for his film Baby. His short films Dad, Antonio's Breakfast and Baby premiered at Sundance Film Festival.

The British born filmmaker is equipped with an astute sensitivity, specificity of vision, and clarity in bringing out truth in performance. With exacting precision, Mulloy’s dramatic framing exudes emotion with a painterly approach. His concern with gestures, textures, moments and expressions combine with the natural drama of real life in a way that makes him one of the most fascinating dramatists working in the short form today. Sundance Film Festival

Mulloy produced the Cuban set film Una Noche directed by his sister Lucy Mulloy. Una Noche premiered at the 2012 Berlin International Film Festival. Una Noche won multiple awards at Tribeca Film Festival ahead of its 2013 US theatrical release.

Mulloy Supports the 'Cinema Community' and its DIY approach:

A community with many strong and individual voices. A community with the festival circuit at its core, making films that shed light on the shape of the world we live in. This community, from my experience, is very good at supporting its members with networks for young non-funded filmmakers helping one another, crewing and offering advice on each others shorts and features. European Film Academy

== Activism ==
Mulloy partners with the United Nations to raises awareness of the crisis for migrating populations and refugees. In 2017 he was awarded the Golden Lion at Cannes Lions International Festival of Creativity for his work with the United Nations High Commissioner for Refugees.

== Filmography ==
Year	Title	Role			Description	Company	Notes
Year	Title	Director	Writer	Producer	Description	Company	Notes
2003	Dance Floor	Yes	Yes		Short film		BAFTA Award Cymru
2005	Sister	Yes	Yes		Short film		BAFTA Award Cymru
2006	Antonio's Breakfast	Yes	Yes		Short film	BFI	BAFTA Award
2008	Dad	Yes	Yes		Short film	BFI	EFA Nom
2009	Son	Yes	Yes		Short film	Sony	
2011	Baby	Yes	Yes		Short film	Film4	British Independent Film Award
2012	Una Noche			Yes	Feature film	IFC Films Fortissimo Films	Gotham Award
2016	Home	Yes	Yes		Short film	Dokufest & Bartle Bogle Hegarty	BAFTA Award
2025	The Spectacle			Yes	Short film		Palme D'Or Nominated
