= BAFTA Award for Best Short Film =

British film industry award

BAFTA Award for Best British Short Film
- Awarded for: Best British Short Film
- Location: United Kingdom
- Presented by: British Academy of Film and Television Arts
- First award: 1960
- Currently held by: This Is Endometriosis (2025)
- Website: http://www.bafta.org/

The BAFTA Award for Best British Short Film is a film award presented by the British Academy of Film and Television Arts (BAFTA) at the annual British Academy Film Awards. BAFTA is a British organisation that hosts annual awards shows for film, television, and video games (and formerly also for children's film and television). Since 1960, selected films have been awarded with the BAFTA award for Best Short Film at an annual ceremony.

In the following lists, the titles and names in bold with a gold background are the winners and recipients respectively; those not in bold are the nominees. The years given are those in which the films under consideration were released, not the year of the ceremony, which always takes place the following year.

== Winners and nominees ==
indicates the winner

=== 1950s ===
Year	Film	Recipient(s)
Best Short Film
**1959** (13th)	**Seven Cities of Antarctica**	**Winston Hibler**
**1959** (13th)	Rodin	

=== 1960s ===
Year	Film	Recipient(s)
**1960** (14th)	**High Journey**	**Peter Baylis**
**1960** (14th)	Return to Life	John Krish
**1960** (14th)	Seawards the Great Ships	Hilary Harris
**1961** (15th)	**Terminus**	**John Schlesinger**
**1961** (15th)	Eyes of a Child	
**1961** (15th)	Let My People Go	
**1962** (16th)	**Incident at Owl Creek (La Rivière du Hibou)**	**Robert Enrico**
**1962** (16th)	Lonely Boy	Wolf Koenig, Roman Kroitor
**1962** (16th)	Pan	
**1962** (16th)	Zoo	
**1963** (17th)	**Happy Anniversary**	
**1963** (17th)	Sailing	
**1963** (17th)	Snow	
**1963** (17th)	The War Game	
**1964** (18th)	**Eskimo Artist: Kenojuak**	**John Feeney**
**1964** (18th)	Mekong	
**1964** (18th)	Muloorina	
**1964** (18th)	23 Skidoo	Julian Biggs
**1965** (19th)	**Rig Move**	**Don Higgins**
**1965** (19th)	One of Them is Brett	Roger Graef
**1965** (19th)	60 Cycles	Jean-Claude Labrecque
**1966** (20th)	**The War Game**	**Peter Watkins**
**1966** (20th)	A River Must Live	Alan Pendry
**1966** (20th)	Sudden Summer	Richard Taylor
**1966** (20th)	The Tortoise and the Hare	Hugh Hudson
**1967** (21st)	**Indus Waters**	**Derek Williams**
**1967** (21st)	Mafia No!	John Irvin
**1967** (21st)	Opus	Don Levy
**1967** (21st)	Rail	Geoffrey Jones
**1968** (22nd)	**Not awarded**	
**1969** (23rd)	**Picture to Post**	**Sarah Erulkar**
**1969** (23rd)	Barbican	Robin Cantelon
**1969** (23rd)	Birthday	Franc Roddam
**1969** (23rd)	A Test of Violence	Stuart Cooper

=== 1970s ===
Year	Film	Recipient(s)
**1970** (24th)	**The Shadow of Progress**	**Derek Williams**
**1970** (24th)	Blake	Bill Mason
**1970** (24th)	The Gallery	Philip Mark Law
**1970** (24th)	The Winds of Fogo	Colin Low
**1971** (25th)	**Alaska: The Great Land**	**Derek Williams**
**1971** (25th)	Big Horn	Bill Schmalz
**1971** (25th)	The Long Memory	John Phillips
John Grierson Award (Short Film)
**1972** (26th)	**Memorial**	
**1972** (26th)	History of the Motor Car	
**1972** (26th)	The Tide of Traffic	
**1973** (27th)	**Caring for History**	
**1973** (27th)	Artistry in Tureens	
**1973** (27th)	The Scene from Melbury House	
**1973** (27th)	Without Due Care	
**1974** (28th)	**Location North Sea**	**John Armstrong**
**1974** (28th)	Acting in Turn	
**1974** (28th)	Facets of Glass	
**1974** (28th)	The Quiet Land	
**1975** (29th)	**Sea Area Forties**	**John Armstrong**
**1975** (29th)	Leaving Lily	Graham Baker
**1975** (29th)	The Living Woodland	Ronald Eastman
**1975** (29th)	Waiting On Weather	Ron Granville
Best Short Factual Film
**1976** (30th)	**The End of the Road**	**John Amstrong**
**1976** (30th)	Energy in Perspective	Peter De Normanville
**1976** (30th)	The Speed Sailors	John Spencer
**1977** (31st)	Best Short Factual Film	
**1977** (31st)	**Not awarded**	
**1977** (31st)	Best Short Fictional Film	
**1977** (31st)	**Bead Game**	**Ishu Patel**
**1977** (31st)	The Chinese Word for House	Kate Canning
**1977** (31st)	The Sand Castle	Co Hoedeman
**1978** (32nd)	Best Short Factual Film	
**1978** (32nd)	**Hokusai: An Animated Sketchbook**	**Tony White**
**1978** (32nd)	I'll Find a Way	Beverly Shaffer
**1978** (32nd)	Planet Water	Derek Williams
**1978** (32nd)	Sunday Muddy Sunday	Lindsay Dale
**1978** (32nd)	Best Short Fictional Film	
**1978** (32nd)	**Not awarded**	
Best Short Film
**1979** (33rd)	**Butch Minds the Baby**	**Peter Webb**
**1979** (33rd)	Dilemma	Clive Mitchell
**1979** (33rd)	Dream Doll	Bob Godfrey
**1979** (33rd)	Mr. Pascal	Alison De Vere

=== 1980s ===
Year	Film	Recipient(s)
**1980** (34th)	**Sredni Vashtar**	**Andrew Birkin**
**1980** (34th)	Box On	Lindsey Clennell
**1980** (34th)	The Dollar Bottom	Roger Christian
**1980** (34th)	Possessions	Andrew Bogle
**1981** (35th)	**Recluse**	**Bob Bentley**
**1981** (35th)	Couples and Robbers	Clare Peploe
**1981** (35th)	Towers of Babel	Jonathan Lewis
**1982** (36th)	**The Privilege**	**Ian Knox**
**1982** (36th)	Rating Notman	Carlo Gébler
**1982** (36th)	The Rocking Horse Winner	Robert Bierman
**1982** (36th)	A Shocking Accident	James Scott
**1983** (37th)	**Goodie Two Shoes**	**Ian Emes**
**1983** (37th)	The Crimson Permanent Assurance	Terry Gilliam
**1983** (37th)	John Love	John Davis
**1983** (37th)	Keep Off the Grass	Paul Weiland
**1984** (38th)	**The Dress**	**Eva Sereny**
**1984** (38th)	Killing Time	Chris O'Reilly
**1984** (38th)	Samson and Delilah	Mark Peploe
**1985** (39th)	**Careless Talk**	**Noella Smith**
**1985** (39th)	One for My Baby	Chris Fallon
**1985** (39th)	The Woman who Married Clark Gable	Thaddeus O'Sullivan
**1986** (40th)	**La Boule**	**Simon Shore**
**1986** (40th)	King's Christmas	Graham Dixon
**1986** (40th)	Mohammed's Daughter	Suri Krishnamma
**1986** (40th)	Night Movie	Gur Heller
**1987** (41st)	**Artisten**	**Jonas Grimås**
**1987** (41st)	D'Apres Maria	Jean-Claude Robert
**1987** (41st)	Short and Curlies	Mike Leigh
**1987** (41st)	Treacle	Peter Chelsom
**1988** (42nd)	**Defence Counsel Sedov (Zashchitnik Sedov)**	**Evgeny Tsymbal**
**1988** (42nd)	Cane Toads: An Unnatural History	Mark Lewis
**1988** (42nd)	The Unkindest Cut	Jim Shields
**1988** (42nd)	Water's Edge	Suri Krishnamma
**1989** (43rd)	**The Candy Show**	**Damian Jones, Peter Hewitt, David Freeman**
**1989** (43rd)	Carmelo Campo	Ariel Piluso, Carlos Toscano, Gabriel Enis
**1989** (43rd)	Tight Trousers	Metin Hüseyin, Elaine Donnelly
**1989** (43rd)	Uhloz	Guy Jacques, Isabelle Groulleart

=== 1990s ===
Year	Film	Recipient(s)
**1990** (44th)	**Say Good-bye**	**Michele Carmada, John Roberts**
**1990** (44th)	An der Grenze	Max Linder, Michael Drexler
**1990** (44th)	Chicken	Jo Shoop, Julian Nott
**1990** (44th)	Dear Rosie	Peter Cattaneo, Barnaby Thompson
**1991** (45th)	**The Harmfulness of Tobacco**	**Nick Hamm, Bary Palin**
**1991** (45th)	Breath of Life	Navin Thapar
**1991** (45th)	Man Descending	Neil Grieve, Ray Lorenz
**1991** (45th)	Trauma	Gerhard Johannes Rekel
**1992** (46th)	**Omnibus**	**Anne Bennett, Sam Karmann**
**1992** (46th)	Two Chimney Sweeps In A Singer's House (Deux Ramoneurs Chez Une Cantatrice)	Michel Cauléa
**1992** (46th)	Heartsongs	Caroline Hewitt, Sue Clayton
**1992** (46th)	Sense of History	Mike Leigh, Simon Channing Williams
**1993** (47th)	**Franz Kafka's It's a Wonderful Life**	**Ruth Kenley-Letts, Peter Capaldi**
**1993** (47th)	A Small Deposit	Eleanor Yule, Paul Holmes, Barry Ackroyd
**1993** (47th)	One Night Stand	Bill Britten, Georgia Masters
**1993** (47th)	Syrup	Paul Unwin, Anita Overland
**1994** (48th)	**Zinky Boys Go Underground**	**Paul Tickell, Tatianna Kennedy**
**1994** (48th)	Lost Mojave	Jonathan Cordish, Vladimir Perlovich
**1994** (48th)	Marooned	Jonas Grimås, Andrea Calderwood
**1994** (48th)	That Sunday	Damiano Vukotic, Dan Zeff
**1995** (49th)	**It's Not Unusual**	**Asmaa Pirzada, Kfir Yefet**
**1995** (49th)	Cabbage	Noelle Pickford, David Stewart
**1995** (49th)	Hello, Hello, Hello	David Thewlis, Helen Booth, James Roberts
**1995** (49th)	The Last Post	Ed Blum, Neris Thomas
**1996** (50th)	**Majorettes In Space (Des Majorettes Dans L'Espace)**	**Carole Scotta, David Fourier**
**1996** (50th)	Butterfly Man	Robin Macpherson, Barry Ackroyd
**1996** (50th)	Dual Balls	Laurence Bowen, Dan Zeff
**1996** (50th)	Machinations	Alice Beckmann, Ralph Seiler
**1996** (50th)	Everything Must Go (Tout Doit Disparaître)	François Barat, Jean-Marc Moutout
**1997** (51st)	**The Deadness of Dad**	**Philippa Cousins, Mandy Sprague, Stephen Volk**
**1997** (51st)	Crocodile Snap	Joe Wright, James Greville
**1997** (51st)	Gasman	Lynne Ramsay, Gavin Emerson
**1997** (51st)	Little Sisters	Andy Goddard, Nic Muirson
**1998** (52nd)	**Home**	**Morag McKinnon, Hannah Lewis, Colin McLaren**
**1998** (52nd)	Anthrakitis	Sara Sugarman, Natasha Dack
**1998** (52nd)	Eight	Stephen Daldry, Jon Finn, Tim Clague
**1998** (52nd)	In Memory of Dorothy Bennett	Catherine McArthur, Martin Radich
**1999** (53rd)	**Who's My Favourite Girl**	**Joern Utkilen, Kara Johnston, Adrian McDowall**
**1999** (53rd)	Bait	Tom Shankland, Soledad Gatti-Pascual, Jane Harris
**1999** (53rd)	Perdie	Faye Gilbert, Rachel Shadick
**1999** (53rd)	The Tale Of The Rat That Wrote	Billy O'Brien, Ruth Kenley-Letts, Lisa-Marie Russo, Murilo Pasta

=== 2000s ===
Year	Film	Recipient(s)
**2000** (54th)	**Shadowscan**	**Gary Holding, Justine Leahy, Tinge Krishnan**
**2000** (54th)	Je t'aime John Wayne	Luke Morris, Toby MacDonald, Luke Ponte
**2000** (54th)	Going Down	Tom Shankland, Soledad Gatti-Pascual, Jane Harris
**2000** (54th)	The Last Post	Dominic Santana, Lee Santana
**2000** (54th)	Sweet	James Pilkington, Rob Mercer
**2001** (55th)	**About a Girl**	**Brian Percival, Janey de Nordwall, Julie Rutterford**
**2001** (55th)	Inferno	Paul Kousoulides, Teun Hilte, Sharat Sardana
**2001** (55th)	The Red Peppers	Dominic Santana, Lee Santana
**2001** (55th)	Skin Deep	Yousaf Ali Khan, Andy Porter
**2001** (55th)	Tattoo	Jules Williamson, Arabella Page Croft, Sara Putt, Jemma Field
**2002** (56th)	**My Wrongs #8245–8249 & 117**	**Chris Morris, Mark Herbert**
**2002** (56th)	Bouncer	Michael Baig Clifford, Natasha Carlish, Sophie Morgan, Geoff Thompson
**2002** (56th)	Rank	Andrew O'Connell, David Yates, Robbie McCallum
**2002** (56th)	Candy Bar Kid	Shah Khan, Benjamin Johns
**2002** (56th)	Good Night	Sun-Young Chun, Yoav Factor
**2002** (56th)	The Most Beautiful Man in the World	Alicia Duffy, Hugh Welchman
**2003** (57th)	**Brown Paper Bag**	**Natasha Carlish, Mark Leveson, Michael Baig Clifford, Geoff Thompson**
**2003** (57th)	Bye Child	Andrew Bonner, Bernard MacLaverty
**2003** (57th)	Nits	George Isaac, Harry Wootliff
**2003** (57th)	Sea Monsters	Matt Delargy, Mark Walker, Raphael Smith
**2003** (57th)	Talking with Angels	Yousaf Ali Khan, Michael Knowles, Janey de Nordwall
**2004** (58th)	**The Banker**	**Hattie Dalton, Kelly Broad**
**2004** (58th)	Can't Stop Breathing	Amy Neil, Ravinder Basra
**2004** (58th)	Elephant Boy	Rene Mohandas, Durdana Shaikh
**2004** (58th)	Knitting a Love Song	Debbie Ballin, Annie Watson
**2004** (58th)	Six Shooter	Martin McDonagh, Mia Bays, Kenton Allen
**2005** (59th)	**Antonio's Breakfast**	**Daniel Mulloy, Amber Templemore-Finlayson, Daniel Mulloy**
**2005** (59th)	Call Register	Ed Roe, Kit Hawkins, Adam Tudhope
**2005** (59th)	Heavy Metal Drummer	Toby MacDonald, Luke Morris, Amanda Boyle
**2005** (59th)	Heydar, An Afghan in Tehran	Babak Jalali, Homayoun Assadian
**2005** (59th)	Lucky	Avie Luthra, Bex Hopkins
**2006** (60th)	**Do Not Erase**	**Asitha Ameresekere**
**2006** (60th)	Care	Corinna Faith, Rachel Bailey, Tracy Bass, Corinna Faith
**2006** (60th)	Cubs	Tom Harper, Lisa Williams
**2006** (60th)	Hikikomori	Paul Wright, Karley Duffy
**2006** (60th)	Kissing, Tickling and Being Bored	Jim McRoberts, David Smith
**2007** (61st)	**Dog Altogether**	**Paddy Considine, Diarmid Scrimshaw**
**2007** (61st)	Hesitation	Julien Berlan, Michelle Eastwood, Virginia Gilbert
**2007** (61st)	The One and Only Herb McGwyer Plays Wallis Island	James Griffiths, Charlie Henderson, Tim Key, Tom Basden
**2007** (61st)	Soft	Simon Ellis, Jane Hooks
**2007** (61st)	The Stronger	Lia Williams, Dan McCulloch, Frank McGuinness
**2008** (62nd)	**September**	**Esther May Campbell, Stewart Le Marechal**
**2008** (62nd)	Kingsland #1: The Dreamer	Tony Grisoni, Kate Ogborn
**2008** (62nd)	Love You More	Sam Taylor-Wood, Adrian Sturges, Patrick Marber
**2008** (62nd)	Ralph	Alex Winckler, Olivier Kaempfer
**2008** (62nd)	Voyage d'Affaires (The Business Trip)	Sean Ellis, Celine Quideau
**2009** (63rd)	**I Do Air**	**James Bolton, Martina Amati**
**2009** (63rd)	Jade	Daniel Elliott, Samm Haillay, Duane Hopkins
**2009** (63rd)	Mixtape	Luke Snellin, Luti Fagbenle
**2009** (63rd)	Off Season	Jacob Jaffke, Shrihari Sathe, Jonathan van Tulleken
**2009** (63rd)	14	Asitha Ameresekere

=== 2010s ===
Year	Film	Recipient(s)
**2010** (64th)	**Until the River Runs Red**	**Poss Kondeatis, Paul Wright**
**2010** (64th)	Lin	Piers Thompson, Simon Hessel, Mila Kirova
**2010** (64th)	Connect	Beau Gordon, Samuel Abrahams
**2010** (64th)	Rite	Michael Pearce, Ross McKenzie, Paul Welsh
**2010** (64th)	Turning	Kat Armour-Brown, Alison Sterling, Karni Arieli, Saul Freed
**2011** (65th)	**Pitch Black Heist**	**John Maclean, Gerardine O'Flynn**
**2011** (65th)	Chalk	Martina Amati, Gavin Emerson, Ilaria Bernardini
**2011** (65th)	Mwansa The Great	Rungano Nyoni, Gabriel Gauchet
**2011** (65th)	Only Sound Remains	Arash Ashtiani
**2011** (65th)	Two & Two	Babak Anvari, Kit Fraser, Gavin Cullen
**2012** (66th)	**Swimmer**	**Lynne Ramsay, Peter Carlton, Diarmid Scrimshaw**
**2012** (66th)	The Curse	Fyzal Boulifa
**2012** (66th)	Good Night	Muriel d'Ansembourg, Eva Sigurdardottir
**2012** (66th)	Tumult	Rhianna Andrews, Johnny Barrington
**2012** (66th)	The Voorman Problem	Lee Thomas, David Mitchell, Baldwin Li, Mark Gill
Best British Short Film
**2013** (67th)	**Room 8**	**James W. Griffiths, Sophie Venner**
**2013** (67th)	Island Queen	Ben Mallaby, Emma Hughes, Nat Luurtsema
**2013** (67th)	Keeping Up with the Joneses	Michael Pearce, Megan Rubens, Selina Lim
**2013** (67th)	Orbit Ever After	Jamie Magnus Stone, Chee-Lan Chan, Len Rowles
**2013** (67th)	Sea View	Anna Duffield, Jane Linfoot
**2014** (68th)	**Boogaloo and Graham**	**Michael Lennox, Brian J. Falconer, Richard Irwin, Ronan Blaney**
**2014** (68th)	Emotional Fusebox	Rachel Tunnard, Paul Ashton, Michael Berliner
**2014** (68th)	The Kármán Line	Oscar Sharp, Campbell Beaton, Dawn King, Tiernan Hanby
**2014** (68th)	Slap	Michelangelo Fano, Islay Bell-Webb, Nick Rowland
**2014** (68th)	Three Brothers	Matthieu de Braconier, Stephanie Paeplow, Aleem Khan
**2015** (69th)	**Operator**	**Rebecca Morgan, Caroline Bartleet**
**2015** (69th)	Elephant	Nick Helm, Esther Smith
**2015** (69th)	Mining Poems or Odes	Jack Cocker, Callum Rice, Robert Fullerton
**2015** (69th)	Over	Jörn Threlfall, Jeremy Bannister
**2015** (69th)	Samuel-613	Cheyenne Conway, Billy Lumby
**2016** (70th)	**Home**	**Daniel Mulloy, Shpat Deda, Afolabi Kuti, Scott O'Donnell**
**2016** (70th)	Consumed	Richard John Seymour
**2016** (70th)	Mouth of Hell	Bart Gavigan, Samir Mehanović, Allie Smith, Michael Wilson
**2016** (70th)	The Party	Farah Abushwesha, Emmet Fleming, Andrea Harkin, Conor MacNeill
**2016** (70th)	Standby	Charlotte Regan, Jack Hannon
**2017** (71st)	**Cowboy Dave**	**Colin O'Toole, Mathias Gilay, Jonas Mortensen**
**2017** (71st)	Aamir	Vika Evdokimenko, Emma Stone, Oliver Shuster
**2017** (71st)	A Drowning Man	Mahdi Fleifel, Signe Byrge Sørensen, Patrick Campbell
**2017** (71st)	Work	Aneil Karia, Scott O'Donnell
**2017** (71st)	Wren Boys	Harry Lighton, Sorcha Bacon, John Fitzpatrick
**2018** (72nd)	**73 Cows**	**Alex Lockwood**
**2018** (72nd)	Bachelor, 38	Angela Clarke
**2018** (72nd)	The Blue Door	Paul Taylor, Ben Clark, Megan Pugh
**2018** (72nd)	The Field	Sandhya Suri, Thomas Bidegain, Balthazar de Ganay
**2018** (72nd)	Wale	Barnaby Blackburn, Sophie Alexander, Catherine Slater, Edward Speleers
**2019** (73rd)	**Learning to Skateboard in a Warzone (If You're a Girl)**	**Carol Dysinger, Elena Andreicheva**
**2019** (73rd)	Azaar	Myriam Raja, Nathanael Baring
**2019** (73rd)	Goldfish	Hector Dockrill, Harri Kamalanathan, Benedict Turnbull, Laura Dockrill
**2019** (73rd)	Kamali	Sasha Rainbow, Rosalind Croad
**2019** (73rd)	The Trap	Lena Headey, Anthony Fitzgerald

=== 2020s ===
Year	Film	Recipient(s)
**2020** (74th)	**The Present**	**Farah Nabulsi**
**2020** (74th)	Eyelash	Jesse Lewis Reece, Ike Newman
**2020** (74th)	Lizard	Akinola Davies, Rachel Dargavel, Wale Davies
**2020** (74th)	Lucky Break	John Addis, Rami Sarras Pantoja
**2020** (74th)	Miss Curvy	Ghada Eldemellawy
**2021** (75th)	**The Black Cop**	**Cherish Oleka**
**2021** (75th)	Femme	Sam H. Freeman, Ng Choon Ping, Sam Ritzenberg, Hayley Williams
**2021** (75th)	The Palace	Jo Prichard
**2021** (75th)	Stuffed	Joss Holden-Rea, Theo Rhys
**2021** (75th)	Three Meetings of the Extraordinary Committee	Max Barron, Daniel Wheldon, Michael Woodward
**2022** (76th)	**An Irish Goodbye**	**Tom Berkeley, Ross White**
**2022** (76th)	The Ballad of Olive Morris	Alex Kayode-kay
**2022** (76th)	Bazigaga	Jo Ingabire Moys, Stephanie Charmail
**2022** (76th)	Bus Girl	Jessica Henwick, Louise Palmkvist Hansen
**2022** (76th)	A Drifting Up	Jacob Lee
**2023** (77th)	**Jellyfish and Lobster**	**Yasmin Afifi, Elizabeth Rufai**
**2023** (77th)	Festival of Slaps	Abdou Cissé, Cheri Darbon, George Telfer
**2023** (77th)	Gorka	Joe Weiland, Alex Jefferson
**2023** (77th)	Such a Lovely Day	Simon Woods, Polly Stokes, Emma Norton, Kate Phibbs
**2023** (77th)	Yellow	Elham Ehsas, Dina Mousawi, Azeem Bhati, Yiannis Manolopoulos
**2024** (78th)	**Rock, Paper, Scissors**	Franz Böhm, Ivan, and Hayder Rothschild Hoozeer
**2024** (78th)	The Flowers Stand Silently, Witnessing	Theo Panagopoulos and Marissa Keating
**2024** (78th)	Marion	Joe Weiland, Finn Constantine, and Marija Djikic
**2024** (78th)	Milk	Miranda Stern and Ashionye Ogene
**2024** (78th)	Stomach Bug	Matty Crawford and Karima Sammout-Kanellopoulou
**2025** (79th)	**This Is Endometriosis**	**Georgie Wileman, Matt Houghton, and Harriette Wright**
**2025** (79th)	Magid / Zafar	Luis Hindman, Sufiyaan Salam, and Aidan Robert Brooks
**2025** (79th)	Nostalgie	Kathryn Ferguson, Stacey Gregg, Marc Robinson, and Kath Mattock
**2025** (79th)	Terence	Edem Kelman and Noah Reich
**2025** (79th)	Welcome Home Freckles	Huiju Park and Nathan Hendren

== See also ==
- Academy Award for Best Animated Short Film
- Academy Award for Best Live Action Short Film
