= 55th British Academy Film Awards =

2002 film awards ceremony

- Date: 24 February 2002
- Site: Odeon Leicester Square
- Hosted by: Stephen Fry

Highlights
- Best Film: The Lord of the Rings: The Fellowship of the Ring
- Best British Film: Gosford Park
- Best Actor: Russell Crowe; A Beautiful Mind
- Best Actress: Judi Dench; Iris
- Most awards: The Lord of the Rings: The Fellowship of the Ring (4)
- Most nominations: The Lord of the Rings: The Fellowship of the Ring and Moulin Rouge! (12)

The 55th British Academy Film Awards, more commonly known as the BAFTAs, took place on 24 February 2002 at the Odeon Leicester Square in London, honouring the best national and foreign films of 2001. Presented by the British Academy of Film and Television Arts, accolades were handed out for the best feature-length film and documentaries of any nationality that were screened at British cinemas in 2001.

The Lord of the Rings: The Fellowship of the Ring won Best Film, Best Director for Peter Jackson, Best Makeup and Hair, and Best Visual Effects. Russell Crowe won Best Actor for A Beautiful Mind, which also won Best Supporting Actress for Jennifer Connelly. Judi Dench won Best Actress for Iris and Jim Broadbent won Best Supporting Actor for Moulin Rouge!. Gosford Park, directed by Robert Altman, was voted Outstanding British Film of 2001. This ceremony is also notable for Eddie Murphy's nomination for his voice role as Donkey in Shrek, to date the only voice-over performance ever nominated in BAFTA history.

Stephen Fry hosted the ceremony for the first time solo, after co-hosting with Mariella Frostrup the previous year.

== Winners and nominees ==
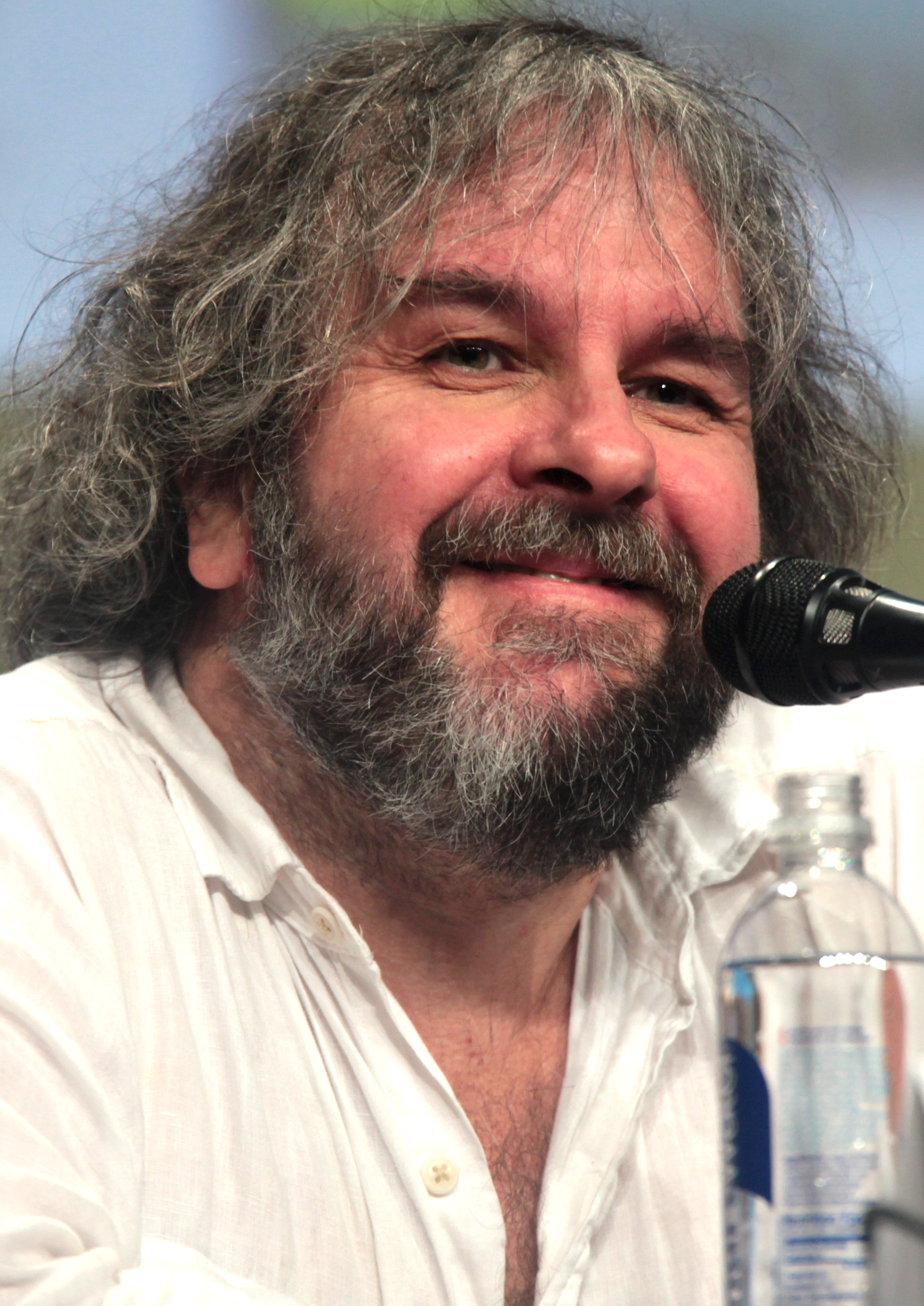
Peter Jackson, Best Director winner

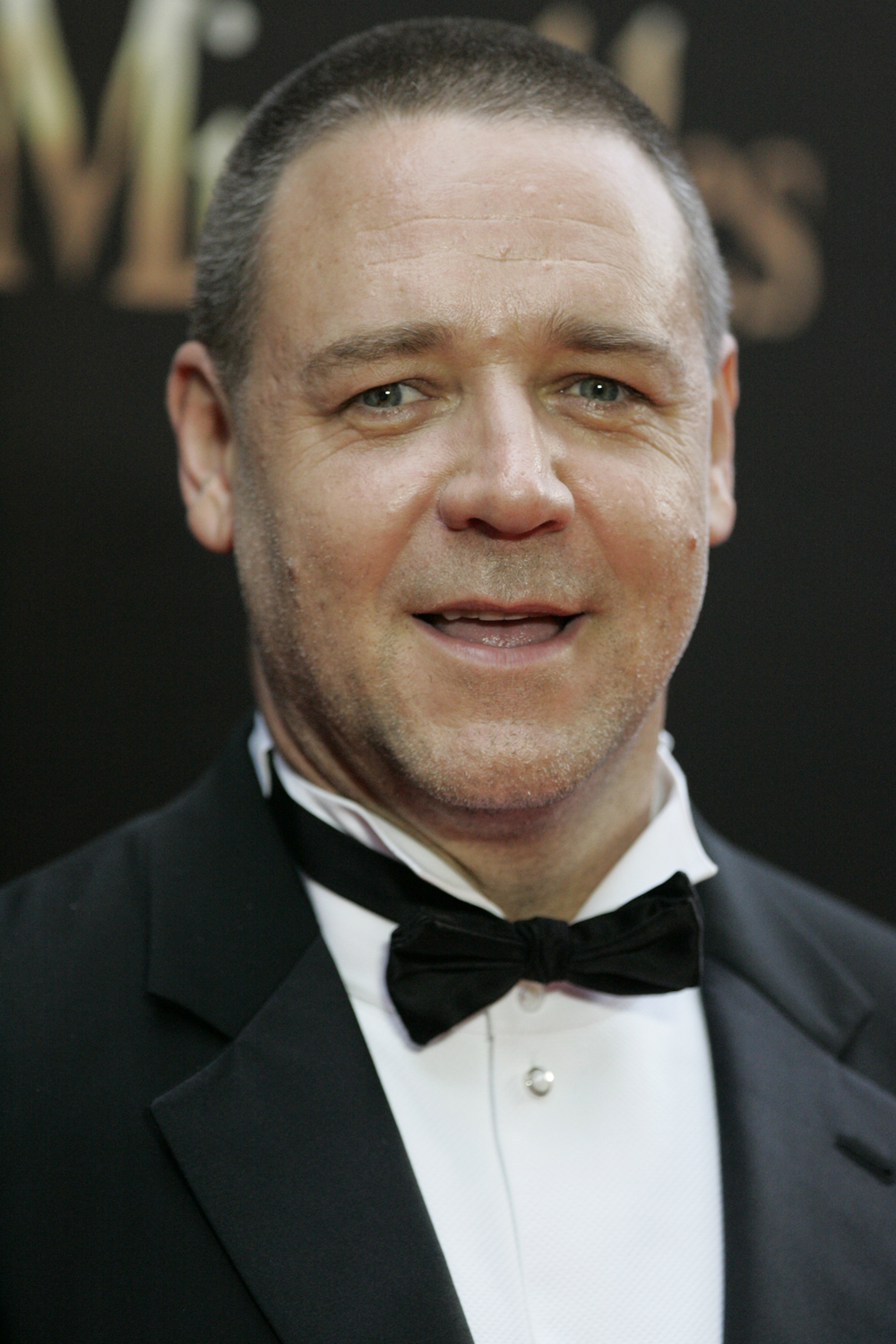
Russell Crowe, Best Actor winner

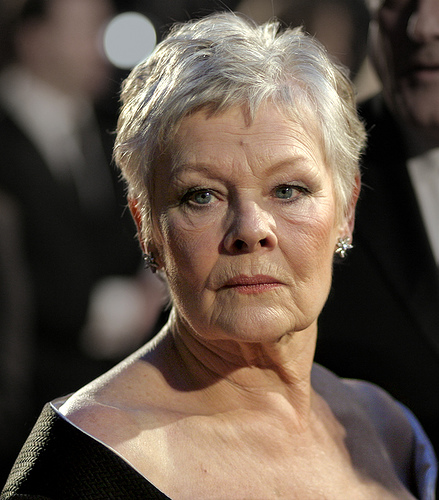
Judi Dench, Best Actress winner

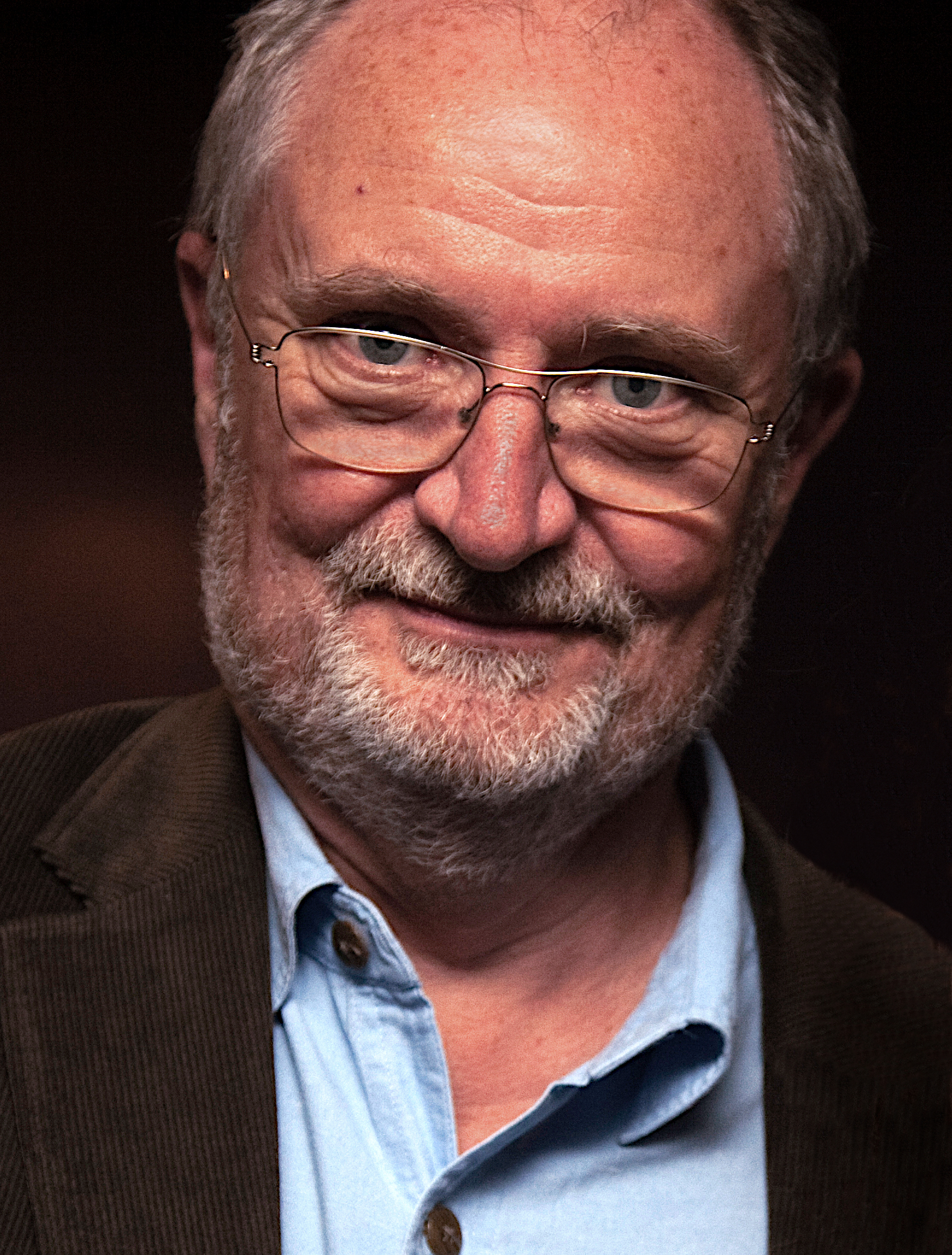
Jim Broadbent, Best Supporting Actor winner

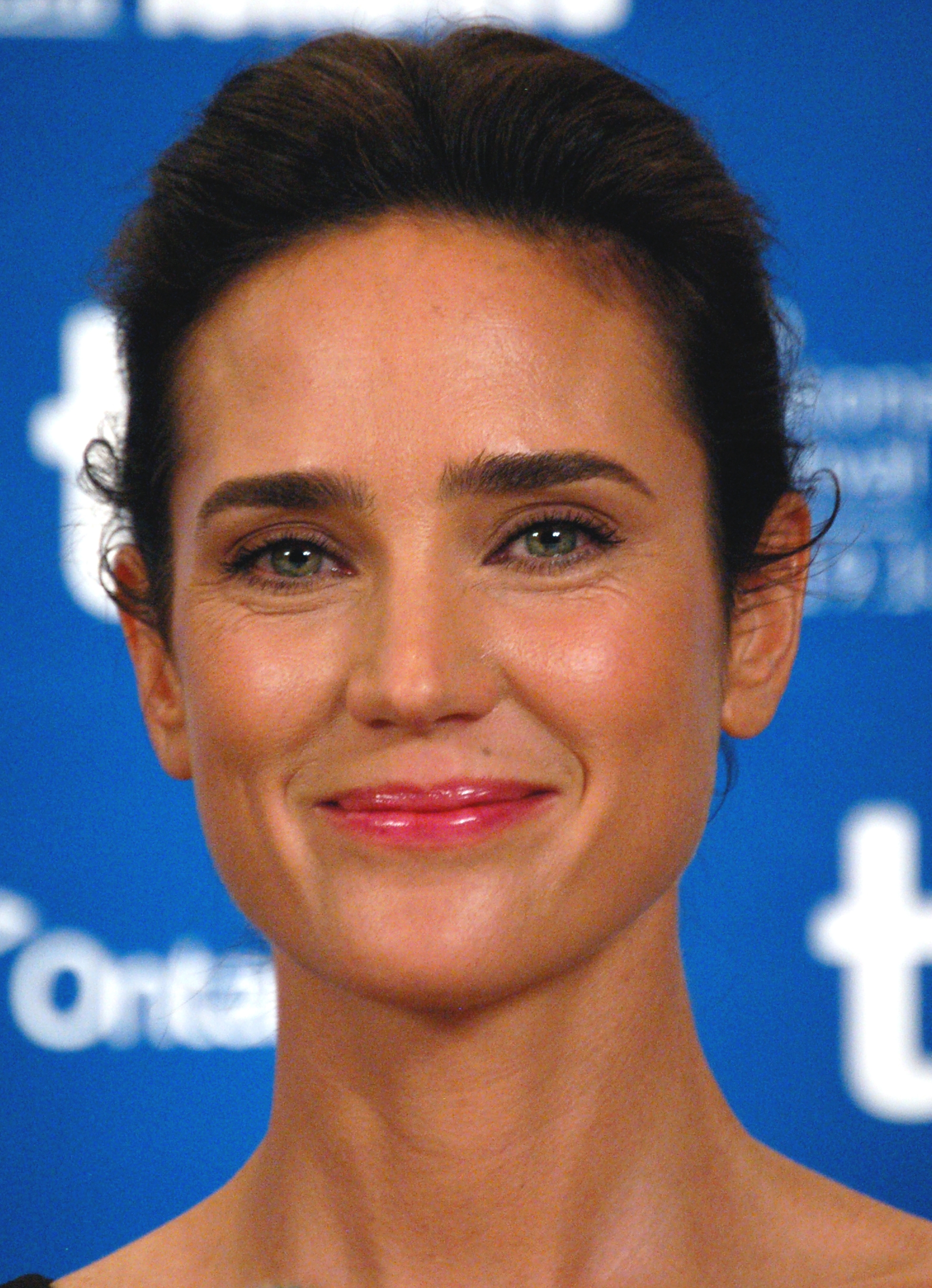
Jennifer Connelly, Best Supporting Actress winner

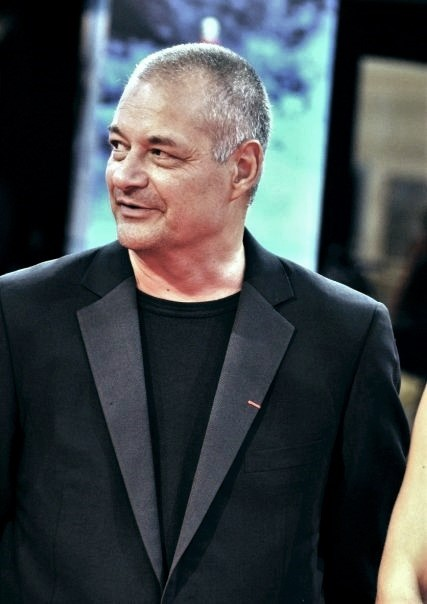
Jean-Pierre Jeunet, Best Original Screenplay co-winner

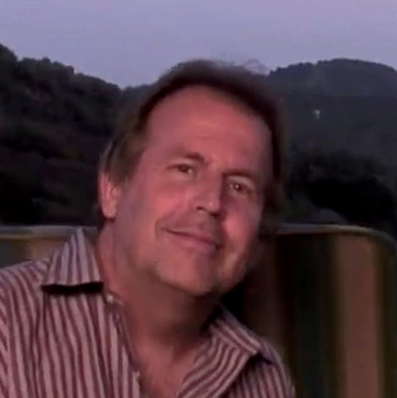
Terry Rossio, Best Adapted Screenplay co-winner

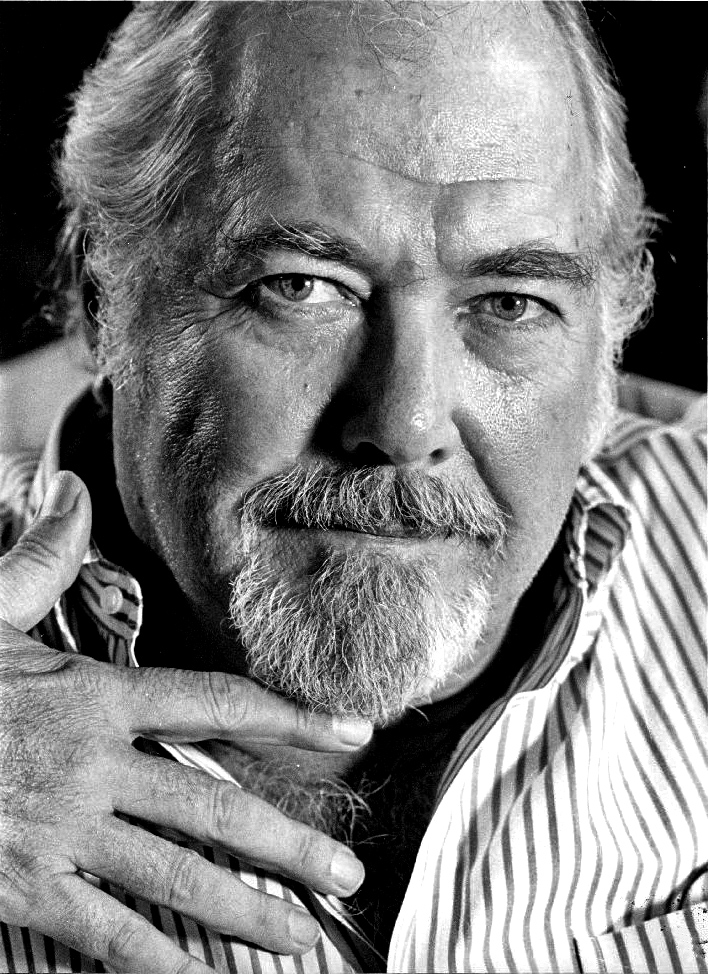
Robert Altman, Outstanding British Film co-winner

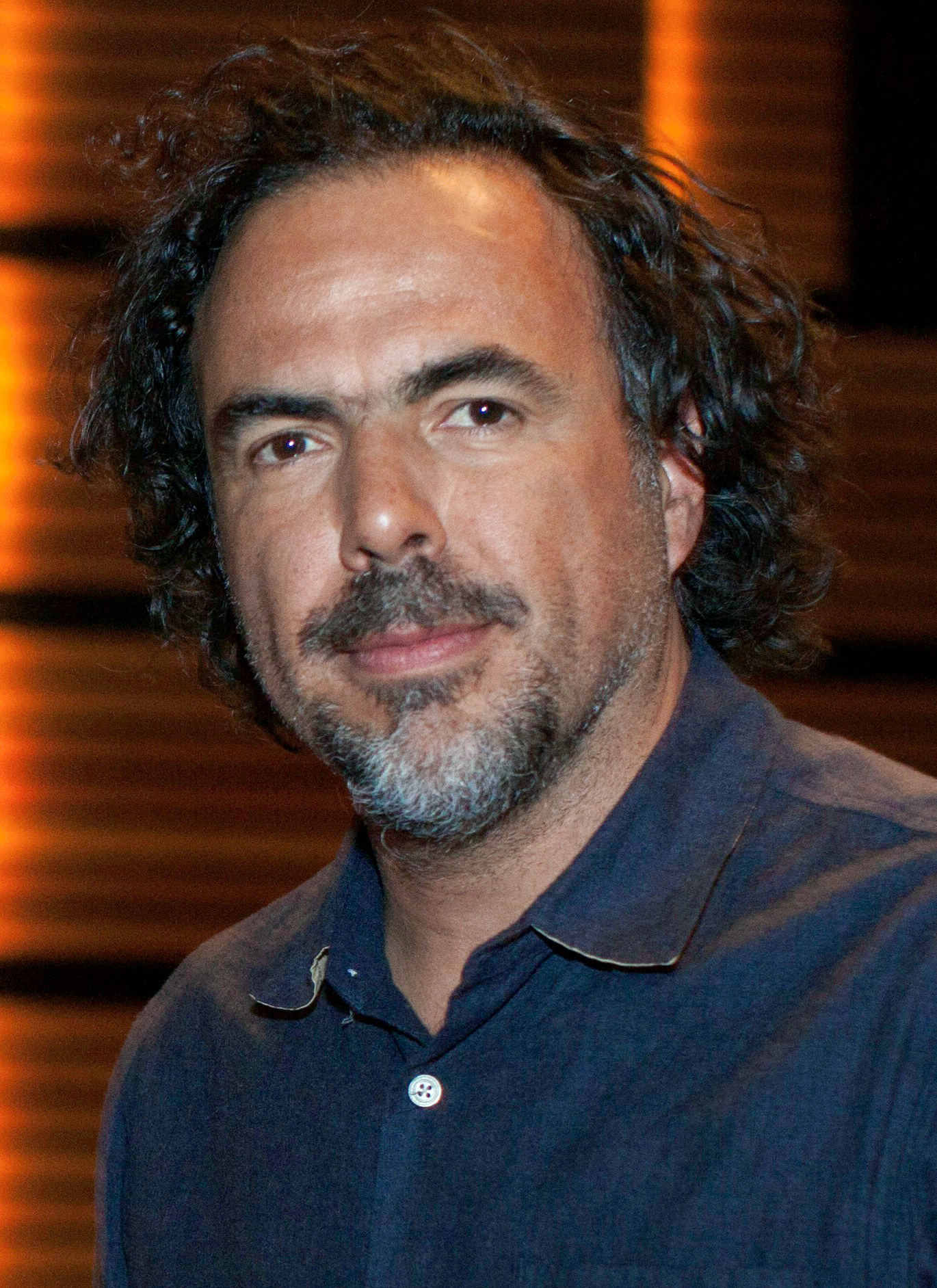
Alejandro González Iñárritu, Best Film Not in the English Language winner

=== BAFTA Fellowship ===
- **Warren Beatty**, **Merchant Ivory Productions** and **John Mills**

=== Outstanding British Contribution to Cinema ===
- **Vic Armstrong**

=== Awards ===
Winners are listed first and highlighted in boldface.

**Best Film**: **The Lord of the Rings: The Fellowship of the Ring – Peter Jackson, Barrie M. Osborne, Fran Walsh and Tim Sanders**; Amélie – Claudie Ossard; A Beautiful Mind – Brian Grazer and Ron Howard; Moulin Rouge! – Martin Brown, Baz Luhrmann and Fred Baron; Shrek – Aron Warner, John H. Williams and Jeffrey Katzenberg	**Best Direction**: **Peter Jackson – The Lord of the Rings: The Fellowship of the Ring**; Robert Altman – Gosford Park; Ron Howard – A Beautiful Mind; Jean-Pierre Jeunet – Amélie; Baz Luhrmann – Moulin Rouge!
**Best Actor in a Leading Role**: **Russell Crowe – A Beautiful Mind as John Forbes Nash Jr.**; Jim Broadbent – Iris as John Bayley; Ian McKellen – The Lord of the Rings: The Fellowship of the Ring as Gandalf; Kevin Spacey – The Shipping News as Quoyle; Tom Wilkinson – In the Bedroom as Matt Fowler	**Best Actress in a Leading Role**: **Judi Dench – Iris as Iris Murdoch**; Nicole Kidman – The Others as Grace Stewart; Sissy Spacek – In the Bedroom as Ruth Fowler; Audrey Tautou – Amélie as Amélie Poulain; Renée Zellweger – Bridget Jones's Diary as Bridget Jones
**Best Actor in a Supporting Role**: **Jim Broadbent – Moulin Rouge! as Harold Zidler**; Hugh Bonneville – Iris as Young John Bayley; Robbie Coltrane – Harry Potter and the Philosopher's Stone as Rubeus Hagrid; Colin Firth – Bridget Jones's Diary as Mark Darcy; Eddie Murphy – Shrek as Donkey	**Best Actress in a Supporting Role**: **Jennifer Connelly – A Beautiful Mind as Alicia Nash**; Judi Dench – The Shipping News as Agnis Hamm; Helen Mirren – Gosford Park as Mrs. Wilson; Maggie Smith – Gosford Park as Constance, Dowager Countess of Trentham; Kate Winslet – Iris as Young Iris Murdoch
**Best Original Screenplay**: **Amélie – Guillaume Laurant and Jean-Pierre Jeunet**; Gosford Park – Julian Fellowes; Moulin Rouge! – Baz Luhrmann and Craig Pearce; The Others – Alejandro Amenábar; The Royal Tenenbaums – Wes Anderson and Owen Wilson	**Best Adapted Screenplay**: **Shrek – Ted Elliott, Terry Rossio, Joe Stillman and Roger S. H. Schulman**; A Beautiful Mind – Akiva Goldsman; Bridget Jones's Diary – Helen Fielding, Andrew Davies and Richard Curtis; Iris – Richard Eyre and Charles Wood; The Lord of the Rings: The Fellowship of the Ring – Fran Walsh, Philippa Boyens and Peter Jackson
**Best Cinematography**: **The Man Who Wasn't There – Roger Deakins**; Amélie – Bruno Delbonnel; Black Hawk Down – Sławomir Idziak; The Lord of the Rings: The Fellowship of the Ring – Andrew Lesnie; Moulin Rouge! – Donald McAlpine	**Best Costume Design**: **Gosford Park – Jenny Beavan**; Harry Potter and the Philosopher's Stone – Judianna Makovsky; The Lord of the Rings: The Fellowship of the Ring – Ngila Dickson and Richard Taylor; Moulin Rouge! – Catherine Martin and Angus Strathie; Planet of the Apes – Colleen Atwood
**Best Editing**: **Mulholland Drive – Mary Sweeney**; Amélie – Hervé Schneid; Black Hawk Down – Pietro Scalia; The Lord of the Rings: The Fellowship of the Ring – John Gilbert; Moulin Rouge! – Jill Bilcock	**Best Makeup and Hair**: **The Lord of the Rings: The Fellowship of the Ring – Peter Owen, Peter King and Richard Taylor**; Gosford Park – Sallie Jaye and Jan Archibald; Harry Potter and the Philosopher's Stone – Amanda Knight, Eithne Fennel and Nick Dudman; Moulin Rouge! – Maurizio Silvi and Aldo Signoretti; Planet of the Apes – Rick Baker, Toni G and Kazu Hiro
**Best Original Music**: **Moulin Rouge! – Craig Armstrong and Marius de Vries**; Amélie – Yann Tiersen; The Lord of the Rings: The Fellowship of the Ring – Howard Shore; Mulholland Drive – Angelo Badalamenti; Shrek – Harry Gregson-Williams and John Powell	**Best Production Design**: **Amélie – Aline Bonetto**; Gosford Park – Stephen Altman; Harry Potter and the Philosopher's Stone – Stuart Craig; The Lord of the Rings: The Fellowship of the Ring – Grant Major; Moulin Rouge! – Catherine Martin
**Best Sound**: **Moulin Rouge! – Anna Behlmer, Andy Nelson, Roger Savage, Guntis Sics, Gareth Vanderhope and Antony Gray**; Black Hawk Down – Chris Munro, Per Hallberg, Michael Minkler, Myron Nettinga and Karen Baker Landers; Harry Potter and the Philosopher's Stone – John Midgley, Eddy Joseph, Ray Merrin, Graham Daniel and Adam Daniel; The Lord of the Rings: The Fellowship of the Ring – David Farmer, Hammond Peek, Christopher Boyes, Gethin Creagh, Michael Semanick, Ethan Van der Ryn and Mike Hopkins; Shrek – Andy Nelson, Anna Behlmer, Wylie Stateman and Lon Bender	**Best Special Visual Effects**: **The Lord of the Rings: The Fellowship of the Ring – Jim Rygiel, Richard Taylor, Alex Funke, Randall William Cook and Mark Stetson**; A.I. Artificial Intelligence – Dennis Muren, Scott Farrar and Michael Lantieri; Harry Potter and the Philosopher's Stone – Robert Legato, Nick Davis, John Richardson, Roger Guyett and Jim Berney; Moulin Rouge! – Chris Godfrey, Andrew Brown, Nathan McGuinness and Brian Cox; Shrek – Ken Bielenberg
**Outstanding British Film**: **Gosford Park – Robert Altman, Bob Balaban and David Levy**; Bridget Jones's Diary – Tim Bevan, Eric Fellner, Jonathan Cavendish and Sharon Maguire; Harry Potter and the Philosopher's Stone – David Heyman and Chris Columbus; Iris – Robert Fox, Scott Rudin and Richard Eyre; Me Without You – Finola Dwyer and Sandra Goldbacher	**Outstanding Debut by a British Writer, Director or Producer**: **Jump Tomorrow – Joel Hopkins (Writer/Director) and Nicola Usborne (Producer)**; Gosford Park – Julian Fellowes (Writer); Late Night Shopping – Jack Lothian (Writer); The Parole Officer – Steve Coogan and Henry Normal (Writer); South West 9 – Richard Parry (Writer/Director); Strictly Sinatra – Ruth Kenley-Letts (Producer)
**Best Short Animation**: **Dog – Suzie Templeton**; Camouflage – Jonathan Bairstow and Jonathan Hodgson; Home Road Movies – Dick Arnall, Robert Bradbrook and Ian Sellar; Tuesday – Geoff Dunbar and Judith Roberts; The World of Interiors – Chris Shepherd and Bunny Schendler	**Best Short Film**: **About a Girl – Janey de Nordwall, Brian Percival and Julie Rutterford**; Inferno – Teun Hilte, Paul Kousoulides and Sharat Sardana; The Red Peppers – Lee Santana and Dominic Santana; Skin Deep – Andy Porter and Yousaf Ali Khan; Tattoo – Arabella Page Croft, Sara Putt, Jules Williamson and Jemma Field
**Best Film Not in the English Language**: **Amores perros – Alejandro González Iñárritu**; Amélie – Claudie Ossard and Jean-Pierre Jeunet; Behind the Sun – Arthur Cohn and Walter Salles; Monsoon Wedding – Caroline Baron and Mira Nair; The Piano Teacher – Veit Heiduschka and Michael Haneke

== Russell Crowe controversy ==
After winning the BAFTA Award for Best Actor in a Leading Role, Russell Crowe gave a speech in which he quoted a poem by Patrick Kavanagh. When the ceremony was broadcast, Crowe was enraged that the poem was cut. He blamed the producer, Malcolm Gerrie, and confronted him about it. It was reported that the confrontation got physical and there was speculation that it would cost him the Academy Award for Best Actor; Crowe later apologized and ultimately lost the Oscar to Denzel Washington for Training Day.

The following poem that was cut is four lines:

"To be a poet and not know the trade,
To be a lover and repel all women;
Twin ironies by which great saints are made,
The agonising pincer-jaws of heaven."

== Statistics ==
Films that received multiple nominations
Nominations	Film
12	The Lord of the Rings: The Fellowship of the Ring
12	Moulin Rouge!
9	Amélie
9	Gosford Park
7	Harry Potter and the Philosopher's Stone
6	Iris
6	Shrek
5	A Beautiful Mind
4	Bridget Jones's Diary
3	Black Hawk Down
2	In the Bedroom
2	Mulholland Drive
2	The Others
2	Planet of the Apes
2	The Shipping News

Films that received multiple awards
Awards	Film
4	The Lord of the Rings: The Fellowship of the Ring
3	Moulin Rouge!
2	Amélie
2	A Beautiful Mind
2	Gosford Park

== See also ==
- 74th Academy Awards
- 27th César Awards
- 7th Critics' Choice Awards
- 54th Directors Guild of America Awards
- 15th European Film Awards
- 59th Golden Globe Awards
- 22nd Golden Raspberry Awards
- 6th Golden Satellite Awards
- 16th Goya Awards
- 17th Independent Spirit Awards
- 7th Lumière Awards
- 13th Producers Guild of America Awards
- 28th Saturn Awards
- 8th Screen Actors Guild Awards
- 54th Writers Guild of America Awards
