= Pelican Films =

Pelican Films may refer to:

- an American company run by Jack Zander
- a British company run by John Armstrong, whose films included The End of the Road
