= Ashley Jade =

British musical artist (born 1987)

- Born: Ashley-Jade Lucia Thewlis; 1987 (age 38–39)
- Genre: Dance-pop
- Occupations: Singer; model; actress

Ashley-Jade Lucia Thewlis (born 1987) is an English singer-songwriter and actress from Ashton-under-Lyne. She charted at No. 40 on the UK singles chart with Soda Club's cover version of Ain't No Love (Ain't No Use).

== Early life ==
Ashley-Jade Lucia Thewlis was born in 1987 in Ashton-under-Lyne. She spent the first five years of her life modelling, before attending St Damian's Roman Catholic Science College.

== Career ==
=== Film career ===
In 2001, she played Tina Elliott in the third episode of Bob & Rose, Kelly in the film When I Was Twelve, and the title character in the short film About a Girl, which won the BAFTA Award for Best Short Film. She also played Leanne in the BBC Radio 3 The Wire episode "The Froghunter's Kiss". In 2002, she played "Kimberley, aka 'Louise'" in Blood Strangers, Katrina Brent in The Stretford Wives, and Jodie McAllister in the Casualty episode "What Little Girls Are Made Of". In 2003, she played Karen in David Thewlis' film Cheeky.

=== Music career ===
On 16 August 2004, she featured on Soda Club's cover version of "Ain't No Love (Ain't No Use)", which charted at No. 40 on the UK Singles Chart. On 22 November, she released "Let Me Be Your Fantasy". On 12 April 2005, she released an album, Dreaming, which was produced by Love to Infinity, and which featured "Ain't No Love (Ain't No Use)", "Let Me Be Your Fantasy", and "On the Run", the last of which was released as a single on 23 August that year. She also featured in the video for The Girls of FHM's "Da Ya Think I'm Sexy?".

== Personal life ==
Thewlis dated MickDeth until his death in 2013, and had a son with him.
