= The Shetland Experience =

1977 British short documentary film

- Directed by: Derek Williams
- Written by: Derek Williams
- Produced by: Douglas Gordon
- Narrated by: Eric Porter
- Cinematography: Maurice Picot
- Edited by: Mike Gascoyne
- Music by: Patrick Gowers
- Distributed by: Shetland Oil Terminal Environmental Advisory Group
- Release date: 1977
- Running time: 25 minutes
- Country: United Kingdom
- Language: English

The Shetland Experience is a 1977 British short documentary film directed and written by Derek Williams and narrated by Eric Porter. It concerns environmental measures taken by the oil industry at the Sullom Voe Terminal in Shetland. It was a sponsored film, produced for the environmental advisory group of the Sullom Voe Association, to which the Shetland Islands Council and oil companies belonged.

== Cast ==
- Eric Porter as narrator

== Reception ==
Russell and Piers Taylor wrote in Shadows of Progress: Documentary Film in Post-War Britain: "The Shetland Experience is the rare Williams film integrating people into the bigger picture without strain. A lovely scene is based around fiddle-playing and knitting in crofters' cottages. A montage of Shetland faces set to music is a gentle riposte to TV vor pops (pops minus vox). Each subject-sketch reverberates with the others: their sequencing suggests a year's seasons passing simultaneously with the dawn-to-dusk of a single day. The symbiosis of industry with idyll, symbolised by Picot's rapid reverse zoom from an offshore platform to a smallholding onshore, has a long lineage in British documentary's history. The film's conclusion is optimistic if subdued, speculating about a future founded on similar benign partnerships. The hopeful prognosis has remained valid for Shetland itself, at least. The film's emotional climax lies in twilit scenes of silhouetted Viking helmets against fire: Shetland's Up Helly Aa festival, 'an expression of identity: an assertion that these are not the sons of Saxons, or of Celts, but of Norsemen'. Though a romantic exaggeration, such impassioned ethnology, married to elemental imagery, is clearly what set the film-makers' pulses racing: and their viewers too."

BFI screenonline wrote: "The film is methodical, rational and pragmatic, like the incoming engineers glimpsed in several sequences. Its structure is superbly designed, the more so for being so self-effacing. Much of this is down to sound directorial planning, helped by Williams writing his own script, which alternates explanatory with elegiac passages. The images are matched to this prose with a logic and concision alien to more anarchic, intuitive filmmakers, 'pure' romantics of the Flaherty type. Like Williams' cerebral The Shadow of Progress (1970), The Shetland Experience engages the mind, then surprises us by causing our hearts to leap."

== Accolades ==
The Shetland Experience was nominated for a 1978 Academy Award for Best Documentary Short.

== Home media ==
The film is included on the British Film Institute DVD Shadows of Progress: Documentary Film in Post-War Britain 1951–1977.
