= Rowles =

Rowles is a surname. Notable people with the surname include:

- Eddie Rowles (born 1951), English football player
- George Rowles (1866–1922), Wales international rugby union player
- Jimmy Rowles (1918–1996), American Jazz pianist
- John Rowles (born 1947), New Zealand singer
- Lauren Rowles (born 1998), British parasport rower and wheelchair athlete
- Len Rowles, film producer
- Mary Laura Chalk Rowles (1904–1996), Canadian physicist
- Polly Rowles (1914–2001), American actress
- Richard Rowles (born 1973), Australian boxer
- Ronald Rowles (1928–2017), Australian rugby league footballer
