= Derek Williams (filmmaker) =

British filmmaker (1929–2021)

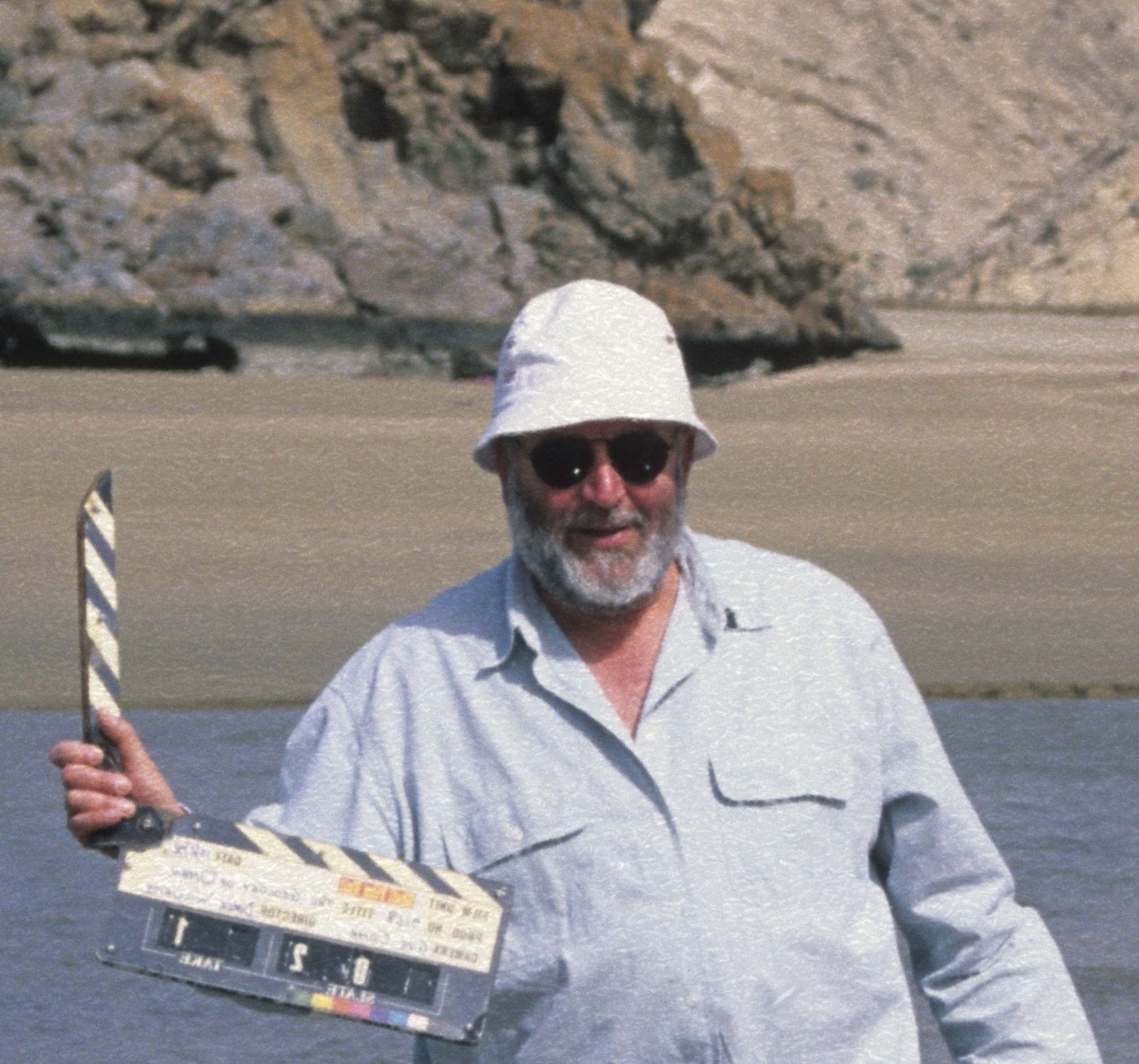
- Derek Williams on location in Oman, 1992
- Born: Derek Williams; August 20, 1929; Newcastle, UK
- Died: August 2, 2021 (aged 91)
- Citizenship: United Kingdom
- Education: Cambridge University (BA)
- Occupations: Director; screenwriter; writer
- Years active: 1950–1992
- Spouse: Olive
- Children: Ed and Matthew

Derek Williams (20 August 1929 – 2 August 2021) was a British documentary film director, writer and historian, who was active in film craft from the 1950s until 1990. His films received four British Academy of Film and Television Arts (BAFTAs) and five Oscar nominations (four as director and writer and one as writer only), all in the short documentary classification.

== Early life and education ==
Derek Williams was born in 1929, in Walker, Newcastle upon Tyne within half a mile of Hadrian’s Wall, an association that was to shape his life. His father, Edward W Williams (who worked for J Collet, a Luton-based milliner) had married his mother, Gertrude (née Scheinman, of Russian Jewish descent) the previous year in Hackney, London. (Note: The couple had been assigned to Newcastle shortly after marrying when Edward Williams was appointed the northern corporate representative for J Collet) Williams attended the Newcastle Royal Grammar School, where he indulged his childhood passion for cinema, joining the Tyneside Film Society in 1937 when it took up residence in the Tyneside Cinema, and which frequently ran documentaries. Williams was inspired by British filmmakers such as John Grierson, Paul Rotha, Harry Watt and Basil Wright. He was also drawn to foreign language features by filmmakers such as Jean Renoir, who had just released his La Grande Illusion (1937) and The Rules of the Game (1939), (Note: often cited by critics as among the greatest films ever made.) Marcel Carné working with Alexander Korda in England exploring surrealism, and adapting plays to film such as Vittorio De Sica.

Williams was evacuated from Newcastle with his school to Penrith at the outbreak of War in 1939, along with contemporaries Brian Redhead and Peter Taylor. After the War, Williams enlisted for mandatory National Service, which he served in Northern Germany before returning to England in 1949, matriculating to Corpus Christi College, Cambridge to read the Historic Tripos.

== Film career ==
Williams' first film, Hadrian's Wall was self-financed and was made during term holidays in 1950 while he was at Cambridge, and which the university accepted in lieu of his undergraduate dissertation. On the basis of this film he was able to enter the film industry as a trainee assistant for World Wide Films in 1952. His first commercial release was in 1955, Oil Harbour, Aden, made for the sponsor George Wimpey Ltd who had the contract to build a port to service an oil refinery being built in Aden by BP. Williams had spent two years living in Aden as cameraman, as well as writer and director for location filming.

His first big break came in 1955 when World Wide Films was appointed by BP to film the British Trans-Antarctic Expedition, under Dr Vivian Fuchs, which Shell was sponsoring. Williams became a member of the sixteen-person party who sailed to the Weddell Sea aboard MV Theron with the intention of establishing an advance base for the main party due to arrive the following year. During the outward journey the ship became frozen in sea ice and so had to depart more rapidly than originally intended, having deposited the shore party who were to remain onshore throughout the Antarctic winter. After 5 months in Antarctica, when Williams was on location as a one-man-crew equipped with film stock and a 35 mm camera, the resulting film, Foothold on Antarctica, was released in 1956. It received a private viewing at Buckingham Palace and went on to receive an Oscar nomination. (Note: The film was also shown on a number of occasions as part of public events which included a talk from Sir Vivian Fuchs and which raised private donations towards the costs of the expedition)

His next film, Oxford, made in 1956, was commissioned by the Central Office of Information as part of their efforts to attract overseas students but in 1957 Williams moved from World Wide Films to Greenpark Films, the beginning of a long and fruitful partnership. Williams initially wrote and directed three commissioned documentaries with Greenpark, featuring social content, like There Was a Door (1957), which examined the care of the severely learning disabled and was sponsored by the Manchester Regional Hospital Board, which was subsequently televised by the BBC. Regular commissions from industry encouraged Williams to become a freelance writer director, when he was able to release at least one documentary a year from 1960 to 1967, beginning with a collection of dramatised documentaries, (Note: Hunted in Holland and Treasure in Malta were frequently shown to Saturday morning children's film audiences in the 1960s, and The Cattle Carters was frequently shown on BBC2 as a Trade Test Colour Film) before releasing a series of films sponsored by BP, earning him two SFTA awards (the forerunner to BAFTA) and an Oscar nomination. (Note: I Do - And I Understand (1964) on behalf of the Nuffield Maths Project won a Society of Film and Television Arts award, which was followed by Turkey the Bridge, which was Oscar-nominated. 1967 also saw the making of Indus Waters, which examined a project undertaken under an Indo-Pakistani treaty to mutually harness the waters of the Indus for agriculture. This film also won an SFTA award (in 1968)) His favourite film from his freelance days was Turkey the Bridge, because it indulged his other great passion, which was history, and in particular, the archaeology of Asia Minor.

In 1969, Williams rejoined Greenpark Films, beginning with a light dramatisation - The Taking Mood - followed by one of his most celebrated documentaries, The Shadow of Progress. By now, Williams was a trusted hand and the most celebrated of Greenpark’s directors. The Shadow of Progress was an early foreshadowing of an environmental crisis starkly presented but with an upbeat message that global catastrophe could be averted with the right technology. "There is a balance" Williams wrote "if we can find it". The film exposed the consequences of industrialization from pollution, and the visual impact and damage to wildlife and the lived environment, which was an unparalleled success winning 25 film and environmental awards. Over 1,900 copies of the film were printed and circulated in a number of languages and the film was twice shown by the BBC on prime time. Williams received a BAFTA award for the film, presented to him by Princess Anne.

Three of Williams' next five films received awards or were nominated for Oscars but the 1973 oil crisis meant that crucial sponsorships from oil giants like BP and Shell started to dry up just as Williams’ own career peaked. (Note: In 1972, Williams made The Tide of Traffic under BP sponsorship, part of a planned three part series (The Shadow of Progress, The Tide of Traffic and a scripted but never made film on the issues created by population growth). The last film Williams made for Greenpark was A Heritage to Build On, released in 1975) The industry of shorts and documentary films were in sharp decline, partly because there was no distribution outlet for new releases. (Note: films had relied on circuit releases as support for major features, which effectively disappeared in the 70s and was not picked up by television who had their own crews featuring journalistic or educational content at the time. The loss of distribution outlet, the rise of television and later environmental distrust of large corporations sealed the decline of prestige documentaries.) In his last significant budget film, The Shetland Experience, Williams worked under the sponsorship of the Sullom Voe Association to record the history, nature and culture of Shetland as the oil began to come ashore to Sullom Voe Terminal. The film was a contemplative portrayal of the Shetland Islands and its place in the oil industry and was arguably Williams' best film, which was Oscar-nominated. (Note: Williams was able to attend the Oscar ceremony in Los Angeles for the first and only time)

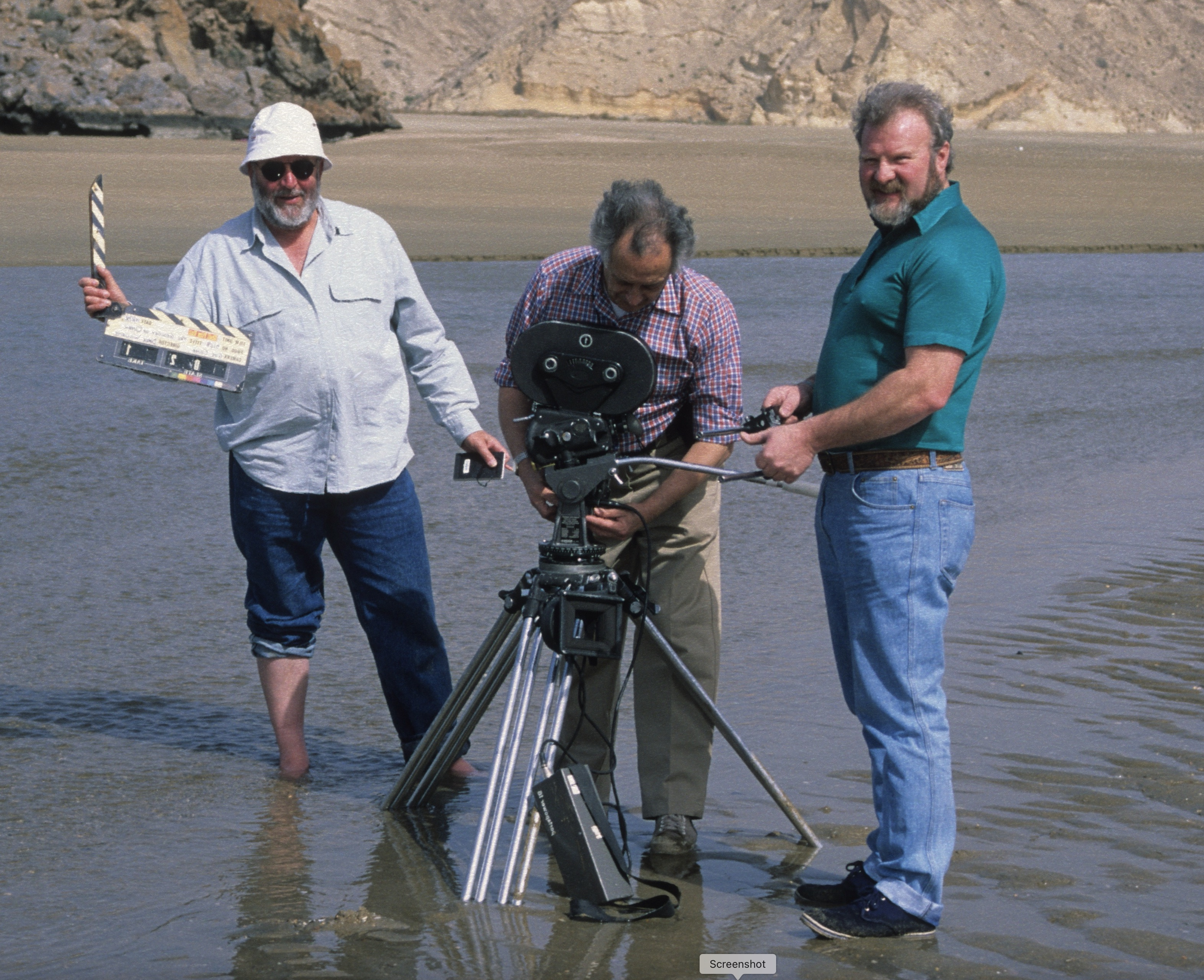
Film crew for Oman - Tracts of Time on location 1992

Williams was unable to produce his own films, lacking the business skills or the inclination, relying completely on sponsorships, which were increasingly hard to come by in the late 1970s and 1980s. He continued making documentaries freelance for an increasing variety of clients, (Note: These include The Science of Art (1976) for Winsor & Newton, The Chemistry of India (1979) for ICI, Planet Water for BP (1979), Army Cadet (1980) and an army recruitment film, South East Pipeline (1982) for Esso, Fair Wear and Tear (1982) for BP, Diamond Day (1982) for De Beers, Configuration Management (1985) and Replenishment at Sea (1986) for the UK Armed Forces) and working on films in an advisory capacity in both the United States and the Soviet Union in the 80s. It wasn't until 1990 that Williams had the opportunity to return to an environmental theme with A Stake in the Soil as writer director, which focused on the exhaustion of soil by intensive farming, and which included an exposition on the history of soil science. This was followed in 1991 with Oman - Tracts of Time (1992), which explored the geological history of Oman and was to be his last film. (Note: Oman - Tracts of Time won gold at the Chicago International Film Festival for best educational documentary, with the score composed by Charles Hart) Patrick Russell writes that these last two films marked a return to form for Williams but a short episode of ill health in Oman brought his film-making career of 40 years (in challenging, often hostile environments around the world) to a close at the age of 62.

=== Filmography ===
| Year | Title | Role | Notes |
|---|---|---|---|
| 1950 | Hadrian's Wall | Writer / Director / Cameraman | University dissertation |
| 1955 | Oil Harbour, Aden | Writer / Director / Cameraman | Released by Worldwide Films |
| 1956 | Oxford | Writer / Director | commissioned by the Central Office of Information |
| 1957 | From the Good Earth | Writer / Director | released by Greenpark Films |
| 1957 | There was a Door | Writer / Director | released by Greenpark Films (televised by BBC) |
| 1959 | The Road to MIS | Writer / Director | released by Greenpark Films |
| 1960 | Bank of England | Writer / Director | |
| 1961 | Hunted in Holland | Writer / Director | Drama documentary |
| 1962 | Cattle Carters | Writer / Director | Drama documentary (televised by BBC) |
| 1963 | Treasure in Malta | Writer / Director | Drama documentary |
| 1964 | North Slope - Alaska | Writer / Director | Documentary for BP |
| 1964 | I Do - And I Understand | Writer / Director | Documentary on behalf of the Nuffield Maths Project (Won SFTA Award) |
| 1965 | Health of a City | Writer / Director | released by Fils of Scotland (unaccredited) (Note: In 1962 Derek Williams accepted an offer from Films of Scotland to direct a film to commemorate the centennial of Glasgow's appointment of its first Medical Officer for Health. Williams' candid attempts to portray the Glasgow of the times brought him into conflict with John Grierson of Films of Scotland, who wanted a more positive portrayal of Glasgow. Williams was not credited on the release of the finished film, Health of a City (1965)) |
| 1966 | Turkey - The Bridge | Writer / Director | Documentary / Short released by Samaritan Films (Oscar nominated) |
| 1967 | Algerian Pipeline | Writer / Director | Documentary released by British Information Services and Greenpark Productions |
| 1967 | Indus Waters | Writer / Director | Documentary released by Interfilm (London) Ltd, (Won SFTA Award) |
| 1969 | The Taking Mood | Writer / Director | Comedy Short released by Greenpark Films |
| 1970 | The Shadow of Progress | Writer / Director | Documentary / Short released by Greenpark Productions (televised by BBC) |
| 1971 | Alaska the Great Land | Writer / Director | Documentary / Short released by Greenpark Productions (BAFTA Award) |
| 1972 | The Tide of Traffic | Writer / Director | Documentary / Short released by Greenpark Productions, Commissioned for the United Nations Conference on the Human Environment (Oscar nomination) |
| 1973 | Scotland | Writer / Director | Documentary released by Greenpark Productions |
| 1975 | A Heritage to Build On | Writer / Director | Documentary released by Greenpark Productions |
| 1975 | The End of the Road | Writer | Documentary released by Pelican Films for BP (Oscar nominated) |
| 1976 | The Science of Art | Writer / Director | Documentary for Windsor & Newton |
| 1977 | The Shetland Experience | Writer / Director | Documentary released by Pelican Films for BP (Oscar nominated) |
| 1978 | Not like other ships | Writer / Director | Documentary for Panocean-Anco. |
| 1979 | Planet Water | Writer / Director | Documentary released by Balfour Films for BP (BAFTA nominated) |
| 1979 | The Chemistry of India | Writer / Director | Documentary released by ICI |
| 1980 | Army Cadet | Writer / Director | Documentary / Short released by Central Office Information |
| 1980 | South East Pipeline | Writer / Director | Documentary / Short released by Wadlow Grosvenor Productions for ESSO |
| 1982 | Fair Wear and Tear | Writer / Director | Documentary for BP |
| 1982 | Diamond Day | Writer / Director | Documentary for De Beers |
| 1985 | Configuration Management | Writer / Director | Documentary for UK Armed Forces |
| 1986 | Replenishment at Sea | Writer / Director | Documentary for UK Armed Forces |
| 1990 | A stake in the Soil | Writer / Director | Documentary released by Shell Film Unit |
| 1992 | Oman - Tracts of Time | Writer / Director | Documentary released by Shell Film Unit (Chicago International Film Festival Award) |

== Retirement and legacy ==
Williams had spent forty years shooting films in some fifty countries on every continent on the globe, acquiring a particular reputation for adventurous filmmaking in remote, inhospitable locations. All his films were sponsored, mostly by industry, but he managed to avoid any marketing or commercial content in so-called prestige documentaries of the period. Millions saw his films, which were acclaimed by the film industry accumulating fifty-eight international gold prizes. Williams achieved four Oscar nominations in the live action short subject category, which hasn't been equalled by any other British Writer Director. And yet, when he stopped making films, he started a new life publishing two books on Roman history. The first traced the Roman frontier from where he was born in Newcastle all around Europe, the Euphrates across North Africa to Morocco. The second examined the cultural contrasts created by the border itself, arguing that it had more to do with preserving Roman culture inside than keeping Barbarians out.

Derek Williams' films and the awards and nominations they received made him one of the leading post-war UK documentary film directors. He was the subject of a retrospective at the British Film Institute on 6 December 2010.

== Personal life and death ==
Williams married Olive Minnie Warren on 19 November 1960. They lived in Kent, England from 1961.

Williams died on 2 August 2021, at the age of 91.

== Notes and references ==
=== References ===
- Shadows of Progress: Documentary Film in Post-war Britain edited by Patrick Russell and James Piers Taylor. A British Film Institute publication by Palgrave Macmillan 2010
