= Small Potatoes (1999 TV series) =

- Genre: Sitcom
- Written by: Richard Pinto; Sharat Sardana
- Directed by: Paul Duane
- Starring: Tommy Tiernan; Sanjeev Bhaskar; Omid Djalili
- Country of origin: United Kingdom
- Original language: English
- No. of series: 2
- No. of episodes: 13

Production
- Producer: Richard Pinto
- Running time: 25 minutes
- Production company: Hat Trick Productions

Original release
- Network: Channel 4
- Release: 9 November 1999 – 11 September 2001

Small Potatoes is a British sitcom television series written by Richard Pinto and Sharat Sardana, first broadcast on Channel 4 from 1999 to 2001. Starring Tommy Tiernan, Sanjeev Bhaskar, Morgan Jones and Omid Djalili, it is set in East London and follows the life of a video rental shop employee, Ed Hewitt, and his friends.

== Synopsis ==
Underachieving twenty-something Ed Hewitt (Tommy Tiernan) has a media studies degree, but he works in a video shop in Leytonstone; however, he tries not to descend to the level of his layabout friends and fellow workers.

== Episodes ==
Small Potatoes ran for 13 episodes over two series.

- Sick (9 November 1999)
- Sexuality (16 November 1999)
- Staff (23 November 1999)
- Scrubber (30 November 1999)
- Secrets (7 December 1999)
- School (14 December 1999)
- Alien (31 July 2001)
- Jimminy Critic (7 August 2001)
- Butch (14 August 2001)
- Blackout (21 August 2001)
- Unbearable Whiteness of Being (29 August 2001)
- Club (4 September 2001)
- Sad Max (11 September 2001)
