= The Tide of Traffic =

1972 British short documentary film

- Directed by: Derek Williams
- Produced by: Humphrey Swingler
- Cinematography: Maurice Picot
- Edited by: Michael Crane
- Music by: Humphrey Searle
- Production companies: Greenpark Productions, Film Producers Guild
- Distributed by: BP
- Release date: 1 January 1972
- Running time: 27 minutes
- Country: United Kingdom
- Language: English

The Tide of Traffic is a 1972 British short documentary film directed and written by Derek Williams. It was made by British Petroleum as a contribution to the 1972 United Nations Conference on the Human Environment in Stockholm. Filming locations were Venice, Rome, London and New York.

== Reception ==
She magazine wrote: "This BP film (which is a kind of sequel to their award-winning Shadow of Progress) is one of the best I have seen and should collect equally prestigious prizes. It presents every facet of the autocratic rule of the motor vehicle. Motoring, says the film, is at once a means to reach places of recreation and a recreation in itself. The car offers a kind of freedom and it is the dream of most families to own one a better one, or a second one. Moving, the vehicle is less trouble than when it stops: the parked car demands 30 times the space of a standing person! All this and much more is shown in this wide-ranging and intelligent film."

== Accolades ==
The film received a Venice Golden Mercury award, and was nominated for the 1973 Academy Award for Best Documentary Short.
