= 60th British Academy Film Awards =

2007 film awards ceremony

- Date: 11 February 2007
- Site: Royal Opera House, Covent Garden, London
- Hosted by: Jonathan Ross

Highlights
- Best Film: The Queen
- Best British Film: The Last King of Scotland
- Best Actor: Forest Whitaker; The Last King of Scotland
- Best Actress: Helen Mirren; The Queen
- Most awards: The Last King of Scotland and Pan's Labyrinth (3)
- Most nominations: The Queen (10)

The 60th British Academy Film Awards, more commonly known as the BAFTAs, took place on 11 February 2007 at the Royal Albert Hall in London, honouring the best national and foreign films of 2006. Presented by the British Academy of Film and Television Arts, accolades were handed out for the best feature-length film and documentaries of any nationality that were screened at British cinemas in 2006.

The nominees were announced on 12 January 2007. The Queen won Best Film and Best Actress for Helen Mirren. Paul Greengrass won Best Director for United 93, which also won Best Editing. Forest Whitaker won Best Actor for The Last King of Scotland, which also won Outstanding British Film and Best Adapted Screenplay. The ceremony also featured the inaugural BAFTA Award for Best Animated Film, which was awarded to Happy Feet, directed by George Miller.

Jonathan Ross hosted the ceremony for the second time.

== Winners and nominees ==
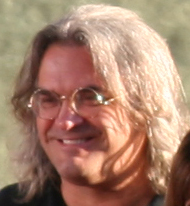
Paul Greengrass, Best Director winner

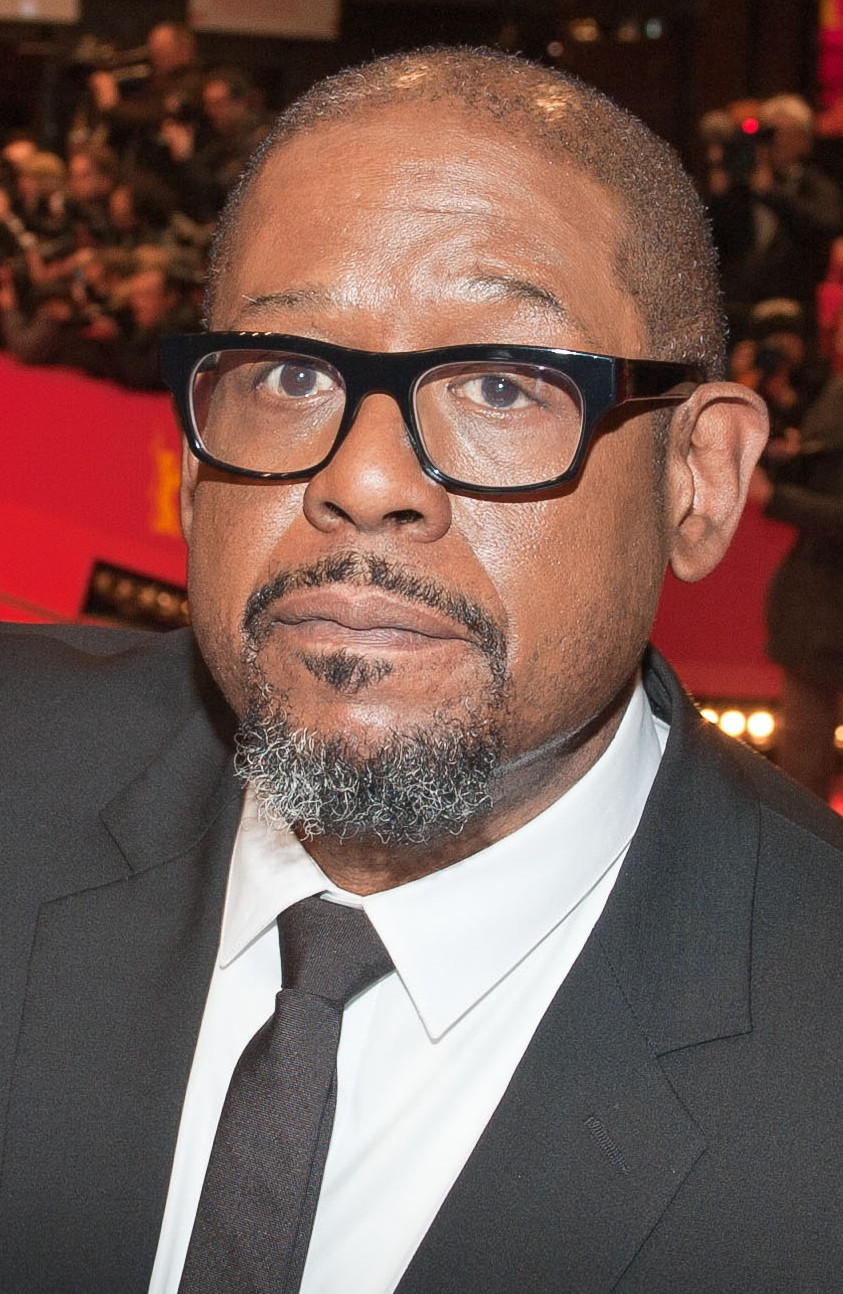
Forest Whitaker, Best Actor in a Leading Role winner

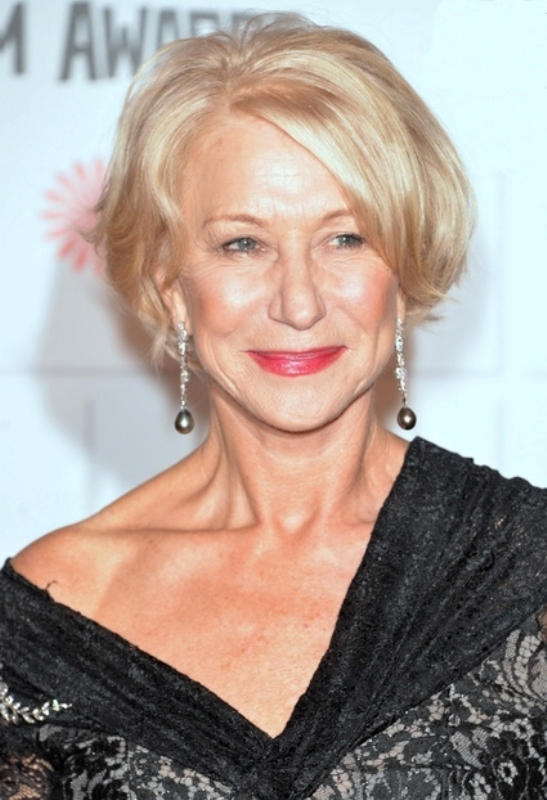
Helen Mirren, Best Actress in a Leading Role winner

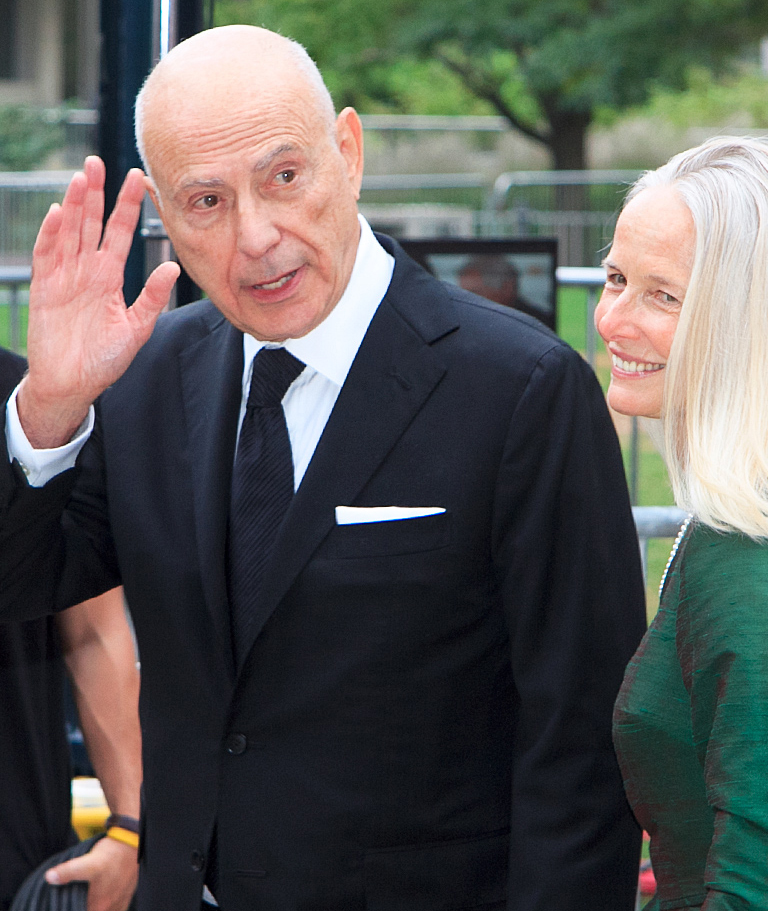
Alan Arkin, Best Actor in a Supporting Role winner

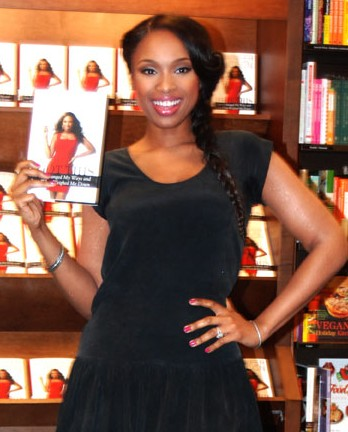
Jennifer Hudson, Best Actress in a Supporting Role winner

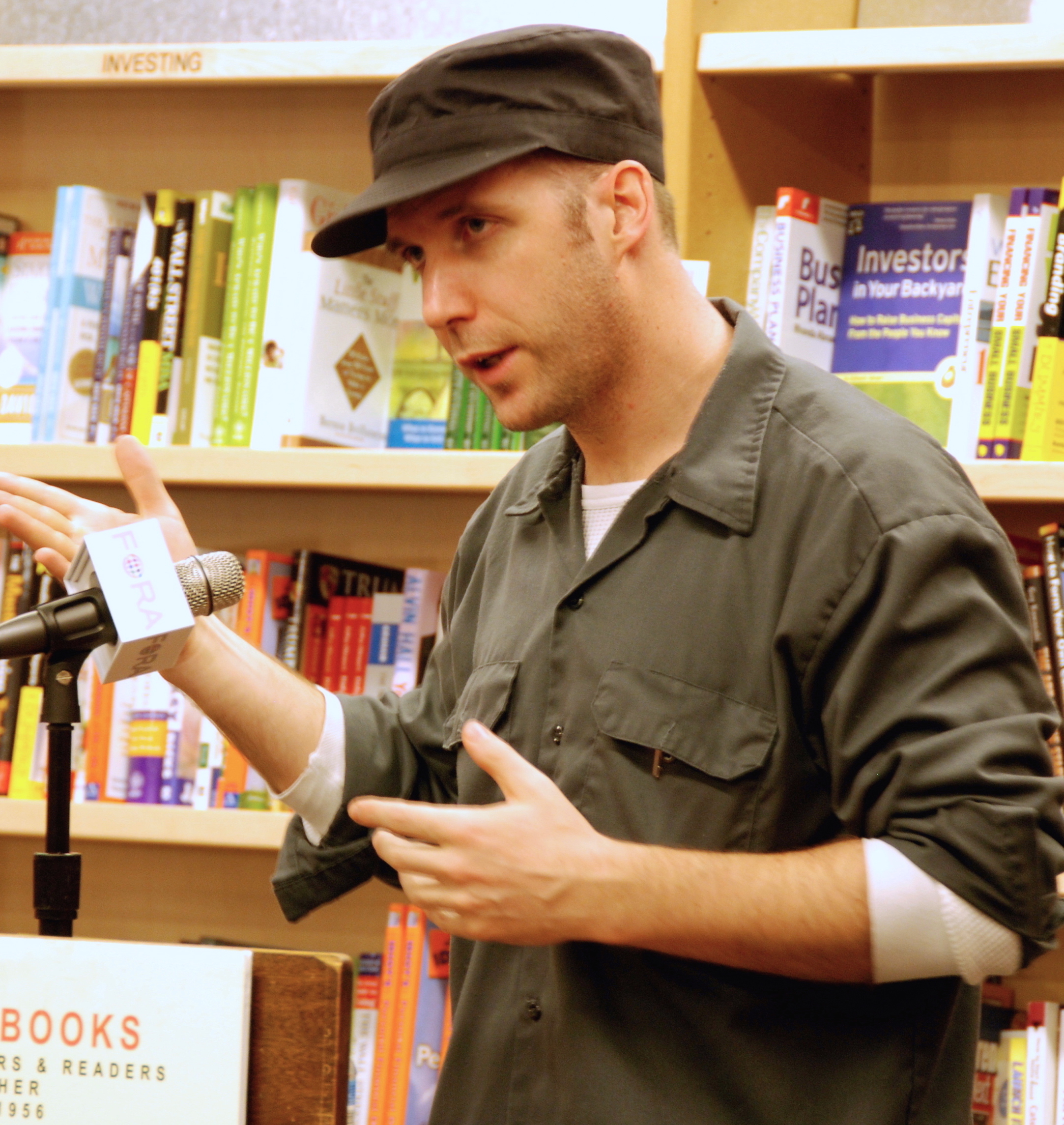
Michael Arndt, Best Original Screenplay winner

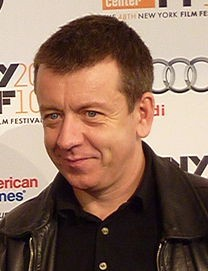
Peter Morgan, Best Adapted Screenplay co-winner

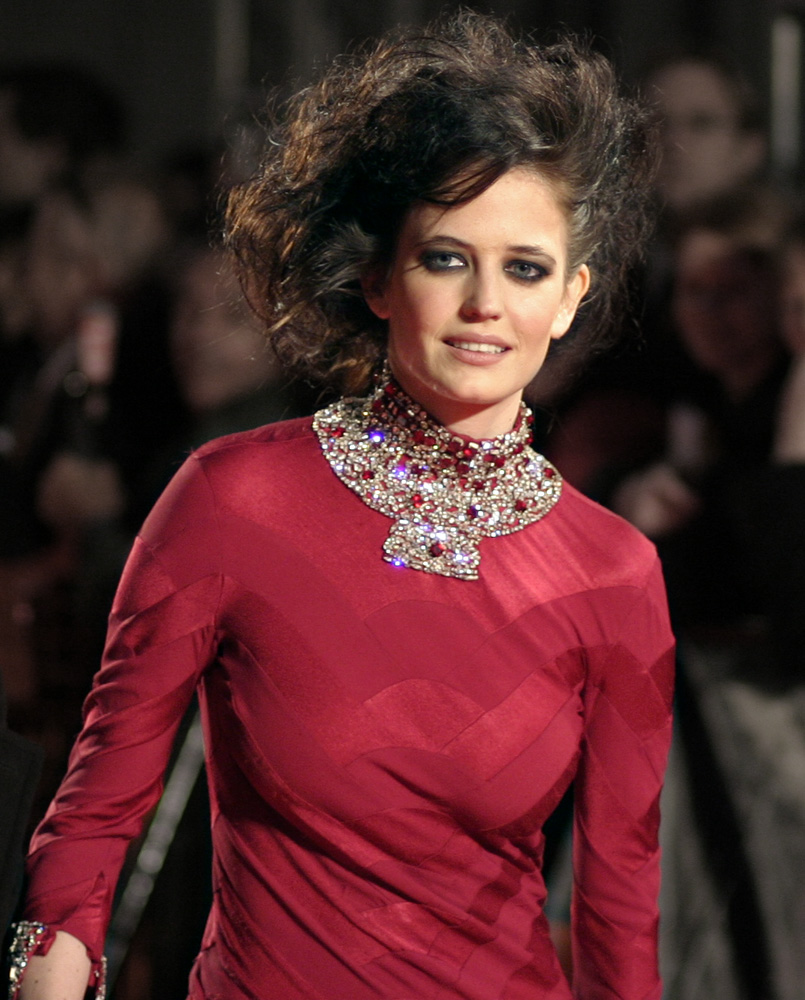
Eva Green, Orange Rising Star Award winner

=== BAFTA Fellowship ===
- **Anne V. Coates** and **Richard Curtis**

=== Outstanding British Contribution to Cinema ===
- **Nick Daubeny**

=== Awards ===
Winners are listed first and highlighted in boldface.

**Best Film**: **The Queen – Andy Harries, Christine Langan and Tracey Seaward**; Babel – Alejandro González Iñárritu, Jon Kilik and Steve Golin; The Departed – Brad Pitt, Brad Grey and Graham King; The Last King of Scotland – Andrea Calderwood, Lisa Bryer and Charles Steel; Little Miss Sunshine – Albert Berger, David T. Friendly and Ron Yerxa	**Best Direction**: **Paul Greengrass – United 93**; Jonathan Dayton and Valerie Faris – Little Miss Sunshine; Stephen Frears – The Queen; Alejandro González Iñárritu – Babel; Martin Scorsese – The Departed
**Best Actor in a Leading Role**: **Forest Whitaker – The Last King of Scotland as Idi Amin**; Daniel Craig – Casino Royale as James Bond; Leonardo DiCaprio – The Departed as William Costigan; Richard Griffiths – The History Boys as Douglas; Peter O'Toole – Venus as Maurice Russell	**Best Actress in a Leading Role**: **Helen Mirren – The Queen as Elizabeth II**; Penélope Cruz – Volver as Raimunda; Judi Dench – Notes on a Scandal as Barbara Covett; Meryl Streep – The Devil Wears Prada as Miranda Priestly; Kate Winslet – Little Children as Sarah Pierce
**Best Actor in a Supporting Role**: **Alan Arkin – Little Miss Sunshine as Edwin Hoover**; James McAvoy – The Last King of Scotland as Nicholas Garrigan; Jack Nicholson – The Departed as Francis Costello; Leslie Phillips – Venus as Ian; Michael Sheen – The Queen as Tony Blair	**Best Actress in a Supporting Role**: **Jennifer Hudson – Dreamgirls as Effie White**; Emily Blunt – The Devil Wears Prada as Emily Charlton; Abigail Breslin – Little Miss Sunshine as Olive Hoover; Toni Collette – Little Miss Sunshine as Sheryl Hoover; Frances de la Tour – The History Boys as Mrs. Dorothy
**Best Original Screenplay**: **Little Miss Sunshine – Michael Arndt**; Babel – Guillermo Arriaga; Pan's Labyrinth – Guillermo del Toro; The Queen – Peter Morgan; United 93 – Paul Greengrass	**Best Adapted Screenplay**: **The Last King of Scotland – Peter Morgan and Jeremy Brock**; Casino Royale – Neal Purvis, Robert Wade and Paul Haggis; The Departed – William Monahan; The Devil Wears Prada – Aline Brosh McKenna; Notes on a Scandal – Patrick Marber
**Best Cinematography**: **Children of Men – Emmanuel Lubezki**; Babel – Rodrigo Prieto; Casino Royale – Phil Méheux; Pan's Labyrinth – Guillermo Navarro; United 93 – Barry Ackroyd	**Best Costume Design**: **Pan's Labyrinth – Lala Huete**; The Devil Wears Prada – Patricia Field; Marie Antoinette – Milena Canonero; Pirates of the Caribbean: Dead Man's Chest – Penny Rose; The Queen – Consolata Boyle
**Best Editing**: **United 93 – Clare Douglas, Christopher Rouse and Richard Pearson**; Babel – Stephen Mirrione and Douglas Crise; Casino Royale – Stuart Baird; The Departed – Thelma Schoonmaker; The Queen – Lucia Zucchetti	**Best Makeup and Hair**: **Pan's Labyrinth – Jose Quetglas and Blanca Sanchez**; The Devil Wears Prada – Nicki Ledermann and Angel De Angelis; Marie Antoinette – Jean-Luc Russier and Desideria Corridoni; Pirates of the Caribbean: Dead Man's Chest – Ve Neill and Martin Samuel; The Queen – Daniel Phillips
**Best Original Music**: **Babel – Gustavo Santaolalla**; Casino Royale – David Arnold; Dreamgirls – Henry Krieger; Happy Feet – John Powell; The Queen – Alexandre Desplat	**Best Production Design**: **Children of Men – Jim Clay, Geoffrey Kirkland and Jennifer Williams**; Casino Royale – Peter Lamont, Lee Sandales and Simon Wakefield; Marie Antoinette – K. K. Barrett and Veronique Melery; Pan's Labyrinth – Eugenio Caballero and Pilar Revuelta; Pirates of the Caribbean: Dead Man's Chest – Rick Heinrichs and Cheryl Carasik
**Best Sound**: **Casino Royale – Chris Munro, Eddy Joseph, Mike Prestwood Smith, Martin Cantwell and Mark Taylor**; Babel – José Antonio Garcia, Jon Taylor, Chris Minkler and Martin Hernández; Pan's Labyrinth – Martin Hernández, Jaime Baksht and Miguel Polo; Pirates of the Caribbean: Dead Man's Chest – Christopher Boyes, George Watters II, Paul Massey and Lee Orloff; United 93 – Chris Munro, Mike Prestwood Smith, Douglas Cooper, Oliver Tarney and Eddy Joseph	**Best Special Visual Effects**: **Pirates of the Caribbean: Dead Man's Chest – John Knoll, Hal Hickel, Charles Gibson and Allen Hall**; Casino Royale – Steve Begg, Chris Corbould, John Paul Docherty and Ditch Boy; Children of Men – Frazer Churchill, Tim Webber, Michael Eames and Paul Corbould; Pan's Labyrinth – Edward Irastorza, Everett Burrell, David Martí and Montse Ribé; Superman Returns – Mark Stetson, Neil Corbould, Richard R. Hoover and Jon Thum
**Outstanding British Film**: **The Last King of Scotland – Andrea Calderwood, Lisa Bryer, Charles Steel, Kevin Macdonald, Peter Morgan and Jeremy Brock**; Casino Royale – Michael G. Wilson, Barbara Broccoli, Martin Campbell, Neal Purvis, Robert Wade and Paul Haggis; Notes on a Scandal – Scott Rudin, Robert Fox, Richard Eyre and Patrick Marber; The Queen – Andy Harries, Christine Langan, Tracey Seaward, Stephen Frears and Peter Morgan; United 93 – Tim Bevan, Lloyd Levin and Paul Greengrass	**Outstanding Debut by a British Writer, Director or Producer**: **Red Road – Andrea Arnold (Director)**; Black Sun – Gary Tarn (Director); London to Brighton – Paul Andrew Williams (Director); Pierrepoint – Christine Langan (Producer); Rollin' with the Nines – Julian Gilbey (Director)
**Best Short Animation**: **Guy 101 – Ian Gouldstone**; Dreams and Desires: Family Ties – Les Mills and Joanna Quinn; Peter & the Wolf – Hugh Welchman, Alan Dewhurst and Suzie Templeton	**Best Short Film**: **Do Not Erase – Asitha Ameresekere**; Care – Rachel Bailey, Tracy Bass and Corinna Faith; Cubs – Lisa Williams and Tom Harper; Hikikomori – Karley Duffy and Paul Wright; Kissing, Ticking and Being Bored – David Smith and Jim McRoberts
**Best Animated Film**: **Happy Feet – George Miller**; Cars – John Lasseter; Flushed Away – David Bowers and Sam Fell	**Best Film Not in the English Language**: **Pan's Labyrinth – Alfonso Cuarón, Alvaro Augustin and Guillermo del Toro**; Apocalypto – Mel Gibson and Bruce Davey; Black Book – Teun Hilte, San Fu Maltha, Jean Meurer and Paul Verhoeven; Rang De Basanti – Ronnie Screwvala and Rakeysh Omprakash Mehra; Volver – Agustín Almodóvar and Pedro Almodóvar
**Rising Star Award**: **Eva Green**; Emily Blunt; Naomie Harris; Cillian Murphy; Ben Whishaw

== Statistics ==
Films that received multiple nominations
Nominations	Film
10	The Queen
9	Casino Royale
8	Pan's Labyrinth
7	Babel
6	The Departed
6	Little Miss Sunshine
6	United 93
5	The Devil Wears Prada
5	The Last King of Scotland
5	Pirates of the Caribbean: Dead Man's Chest
3	Children of Men
3	Marie Antoinette
3	Notes on a Scandal
2	Dreamgirls
2	Happy Feet
2	The History Boys
2	Venus
2	Volver

Films that received multiple awards
Awards	Film
3	The Last King of Scotland
3	Pan's Labyrinth
2	Children of Men
2	Little Miss Sunshine
2	The Queen
2	United 93

== In Memoriam ==
- Jack Wild
- Johnny Sekka
- Teddy Joseph
- Derek Bond
- Philippe Noiret
- Henry Bumstead
- Shohei Imamura
- Alida Valli
- Garth Thomas
- Gordon Parks
- Carlo Ponti
- Glenn Ford
- Jack Palance
- Patrick Allen
- Peter Benchley
- June Allyson
- Sven Nykvist
- William Franklyn
- Val Guest
- Malcolm Arnold
- Kenneth Griffith
- Maureen Stapleton
- Peter Boyle
- Mitzi Cunliffe
- Robert Altman

== See also ==
- 79th Academy Awards
- 32nd César Awards
- 12th Critics' Choice Awards
- 59th Directors Guild of America Awards
- 20th European Film Awards
- 64th Golden Globe Awards
- 27th Golden Raspberry Awards
- 21st Goya Awards
- 22nd Independent Spirit Awards
- 12th Lumière Awards
- 18th Producers Guild of America Awards
- 11th Satellite Awards
- 33rd Saturn Awards
- 13th Screen Actors Guild Awards
- 59th Writers Guild of America Awards
