= St Damian's Roman Catholic Science College =

St Damian's R.C. Science College
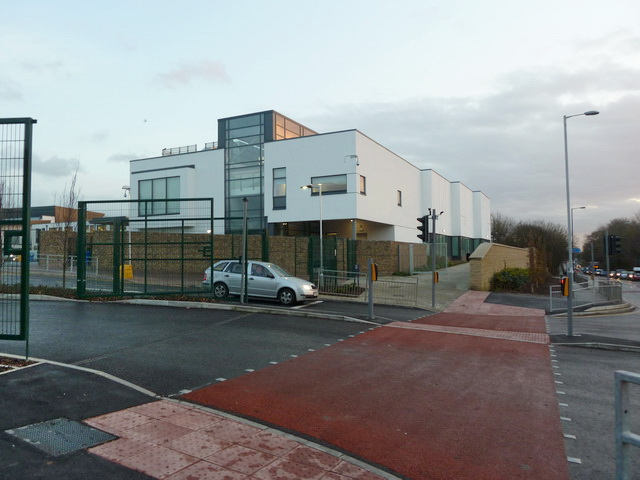
- The school in November 2011

Location
- Lees Road; Ashton-under-Lyne; Greater Manchester, OL6 8BH; England; 53.50921°N 2.07697°W

Information
- Type: Voluntary aided school
- Motto: In Omnibus Fidelis - In All Things Faithful
- Religious affiliation: Roman Catholic
- Established: 1963
- Local authority: Tameside Council
- Department for Education URN: 106270 Tables
- Ofsted: Reports
- Headteacher: Sheldon Logue
- Gender: Coeducational
- Age: 11 to 16
- Enrolment: 830 as of December 2022
- Website: https://www.stdamians.co.uk/

St Damian's R.C Science College is a coeducational Roman Catholic secondary school located in Ashton-under-Lyne in the English county of Greater Manchester.

Established in 1963 as St Damian's Catholic Secondary Modern School, it became a comprehensive school in later years and was also awarded Science College status. As part of the Building Schools for the Future Project a new school building constructed by Carillion was occupied May 2011. Today St Damian's is a voluntary aided school administered by Tameside Metropolitan Borough Council and the Roman Catholic Diocese of Salford.

St Damian's RC Science College offers GCSEs, BTECs and Cambridge Nationals as programmes of study for pupils. The school also has a specialism in science.

== Notable former pupils ==
- Elyes Gabel, actor
- Mike Hall, politician
- Ashley Jade, singer and actress
