= Julie Rutterford =

British film and television screenwriter

Julie Rutterford is a British film and television screenwriter. She shared a BAFTA Award for Best Short Film with producer Janey de Nordwall and director Brian Percival in 2001 for their film About a Girl. She had previously scripted episodes for Brookside and some radio work.

She has also written episodes for three Kudos television drama series: Hustle, Life on Mars and Ashes to Ashes, as well as other popular series such as Teachers, and Shameless.
