= Paul Kousoulides =

British television and film director

- Occupations: Television and film director
- Years active: 1999—

Paul Kousoulides is a British television and film director.

Kousoulides is a graduate of the National Film and Television School. His debut film, Bass Odyssey (2000), was broadcast on Channel 4 and was nominated for the Royal Television Society Award for Best Fictional Short. His next film, Inferno (2001), starring Sanjeev Baskhar, was nominated for the BAFTA Award for Best Short Film in 2001. It won the Best Short Film prize at the 2002 London Sci-Fi Festival.

Kousoulides directed three episodes of the ITV comedy drama Cold Feet in 2001, two episodes of the Sky One series Mile High in 2004, and an episode of the BBC One medical drama Holby City in 2005.

== Filmography ==
Year	Title	Role	Description
2000	Wag the Dogma	Camera operator	Short film (NFTS)
2000	Bass Odyssey	Director	Short film (NFTS)
2001	Inferno	Director	Short film (NFTS)
2001	Cold Feet	Director	3 episodes of television series: Series 4, Episode 4; Series 4, Episode 5; Series 4, Episode 6
2004	Mile High	Director	2 episodes of television series: Series 2, Episode 1; Series 2, Episode 2
2005	Holby City	Director	1 episode of television series: "Another Car Wreck"
