= About a Girl (2001 film) =

2001 film by Brian Percival

- Directed by: Brian Percival
- Written by: Julie Rutterford
- Produced by: Janey de Nordwall; Rebecca Wright
- Starring: Ashley Thewlis; John Slater; Sue Jaynes; Loren Crook
- Cinematography: Geoff Boyle
- Edited by: Phil Tune
- Release date: 25 August 2001 (Edinburgh Film Festival)
- Running time: 9 minutes
- Country: United Kingdom
- Language: English

About a Girl is a nine-minute short film directed by Brian Percival. In 2001, it won the BAFTA Award for Best Short Film. It also won an award at the Edinburgh International Film Festival for Best British Short, the TCM Classic Shorts Award prize at the London Film Festival, and the Jury Prize at the Raindance Film Festival. The script was written by Julie Rutterford and the film was produced by Janey de Nordwall. The leading role was played by Ashley Thewlis.

== Plot ==
About a Girl opens with a striking shot of a silhouette — against a skyline of clouds above a field — of a girl singing the Britney Spears song "Stronger" and doing the dance routine. It cuts abruptly to a close-up of the girl talking to the camera. She is walking against a backdrop of Manchester's industrial landscape, talking non-stop, mixing wry statements about stardom and singers with random quotes from her parents and descriptions of her life: her relationship with her dad, her frustrations with her mum, her desire to become a famous singer, and the band she has formed with her friends. Her monologue is interrupted and intercut with different scenes of her with her family and her dad; her in a perfume department, sitting on a bench singing "Stronger" again, and on the back of a bus with her friends singing "Oops!... I Did It Again" (also by Britney Spears) and doing the dance routine featured in the music video for the song.

As she goes on walking alongside a canal, the girl's stories become more and more underlain by an uncomfortable feeling that the gravity of her experiences does not match her flippant retelling of her everyday life: her descriptions of her pop idols and her favourite ice cream are mixed with hints about family troubles, poverty and domestic violence. The 'underside' to her light-hearted storytelling is revealed when she throws the plastic bag she has been carrying into the canal. An underwater shot reveals a baby surrounded by blood. The film ends with the girl walking away while humming to herself.

== Cast ==
- Ashley Thewlis as Girl
- John Slater as Father
- Sue Jaynes as Mother
- Loren Crook as Toddler
