= Inferno (2001 film) =

- Directed by: Paul Kousoulides
- Written by: Sharat Sardana
- Starring: Emily Booth; Sanjeev Bhaskar; Nitin Ganatra
- Production company: National Film and Television School
- Release date: 2001
- Running time: 28 minutes
- Country: United Kingdom
- Language: English

Inferno is a 2001 28-minute-long sci-fi film directed by Paul Kousoulides, featuring UK cult actress/presenter Emily Booth.

== Plot ==
Set inside a "Quake" like video game, one of the game's cannon-fodder grunts falls for the Lara Croft-inspired heroine and, in a constantly looping game level, tries time and again to catch her attention before she can "chain gun" him.

== Cast ==
- Sanjeev Bhaskar: "Jaz"
- Nitin Ganatra: "Naz"
- Emily Booth: "Laura"
- Alan Talbot: "Mr. Bonecrusher"

== Prizes ==
Commissioned by the UK's Channel 4, Inferno won the Silver Hugo Award at the 2002 Chicago International Film Festival, Best Short Film at the 2002 London Sci-Fi Film Festival. It was also nominated for a BAFTA for Best Short Film in 2002.
