= Asitha Ameresekere =

British-Sri Lankan filmmaker and writer (born 1971)

- Born: 24 June 1971 (age 54); London, England
- Education: Overseas Children's School in Sri Lanka, Harrow School in London, Bristol University, California Institute of the Arts
- Occupations: filmmaker, writer
- Notable work: short film Do Not Erase

Asitha Ameresekere (born 24 June 1971) is a British-Sri Lankan filmmaker and writer.

Ameresekere was born in London, and was educated at the Overseas Children's School in Sri Lanka, Harrow School in London and read Classics at Bristol University. Ameresekere received an MFA in Directing for Theatre, Video & Cinema at the California Institute of the Arts.

== Career ==
Ameresekere's short film Do Not Erase won Best Short Film at the 60th British Academy Film Awards (BAFTA). Ameresekere was in the development stage of his next short film, in addition to writing two feature films and a novella.

A collection of Ameresekere's short stories, Wedding Gifts & Other Presents, was planned to be published in May 2007 by Perera-Hussein Books in Colombo, Sri Lanka.

== Filmography ==
- 14 - short film (2009)
- Do Not Erase - short film (2005)
- In Sight - short film (2003)
