= Martina Amati =

Italian filmmaker

- Born: 14 May 1969; Milan, Italy
- Occupations: Film director, screenwriter, artist
- Spouse: Charles Steel

Martina Amati (born 14 May 1969) is an Italian BAFTA winning filmmaker and artist. Her work is known for underwater and gravity defying scenes.

== Early years ==
Amati studied at the Brera Academy in Milan. Upon graduation her work was selected for the first Salon Primo di Brera. Following this, curator Andrea Lissoni invited her to exhibit her video Little Swimming Woman at 'Traslochi', it:Palazzo dell'Arengario, Milan. At this time, after an offer from MTV Europe, She moved to London, to take the position as On Air Producer.

== Career ==
After making many MTV Title Sequences and Promos and working in a team that designed MTV Italy, Amati returned to create her own work, with Altitude, a travel documentary following actor Joseph Fiennes across Tibet, presented at the Hay Festival of Literature & Arts, Wales. She subsequently made two short documentaries commissioned by Discovery Channel, Liquidman, screened at Hot Docs Canadian International Documentary Festival and Tapeman.

In 2008 Amati moved into drama with three short films that premiered in competition at the Sundance Film Festival, BFI London Film Festival and Berlinale film festivals. With her short dramas Amati won a BAFTA (I Do Air), a BAFTA Los Angeles Certificate of Excellence (A' Mare), and received another BAFTA nomination in 2012 for Chalk, which also won the BIFA alongside other International Awards. Her dramatic work features non-professional actors and involved a process of workshopping to develop the scripts.

In 2012 Amati was awarded a Wellcome Trust Arts Award to make Under, a multiple screen installation entirely filmed and performed underwater in one breath of air. Under debuted at Ambika P3, London 2015.

== Personal life ==
Amati grew up in Italy. She has a passion for freediving.

== Filmography ==
Art video
| Year | Title | Director | Writer | Notes |
|---|---|---|---|---|
| 1993 | I'll Be Back In One Hour | Yes | Yes | Also performer |
| 1996 | Little Swimming Woman | Yes | No | Also drawings |
| 2011 | Submission | Yes | Yes | |
| 2013 | Je T'Ecoute | Yes | Yes | |
| 2015 | Under | Yes | Yes | Also performer |

Documentary film
| Year | Title | Director | Writer | DoP |
|---|---|---|---|---|
| 2005 | Altitude | Yes | Yes | Yes |
| 2013 | Liquidman | Yes | Yes | No |
| 2015 | Tapeman | Yes | Yes | Yes |

Short film
| Year | Title | Director | Writer |
|---|---|---|---|
| 2008 | A'Mare | Yes | Yes |
| 2009 | I Do Air | Yes | Yes |
| 2011 | Chalk | Yes | Yes |

== Awards and nominations ==
| Year | Award | Category | Title | Result |
|---|---|---|---|---|
| 2008 | UNICEF Award | | A'Mare | Won |
| 2009 | BAFTA Los Angeles | Certificate of Excellence | A'Mare | Won |
| 2010 | BAFTA | Best Short Film | I Do Air | Won |
| 2011 | British Independent Film Awards | Best British Short Film | Chalk | Won |
| 2012 | BAFTA | Best Short Film | Chalk | Nominated |
