= Do Not Erase =

- Directed by: Asitha Ameresekere
- Release date: 2006
- Country: United Kingdom
- Language: English

Do Not Erase is a 2006 short film written and directed by Asitha Ameresekere. Do Not Erase won Best Short Film at the 60th British Academy Film Awards (BAFTA).

== Plot ==
Annie sends video diaries to her 19-year-old son who is stationed in Iraq under British Forces. It isn't long before the video becomes more than just a diary. Set against the backdrop of the current Iraqi conflict, the film explores its impact on an ordinary family in the north of England.

== Cast ==
- Jeanette Rourke – Annie
- Peter Andrew – Frank
- Sasha Hermann – Sharona

== Awards ==
60th British Academy Film Awards (BAFTA)

- Won: Best Short Film

22nd Hamburg International Short Film Festival

- Won: Audience Award Winner

15th Augsburg Film Festival

- Won: Audience Award Winner

short cuts Cologne no.9

- Won: Jury Award & Audience Award Winner
