= The Shadow of Progress =

1970 British documentary film

- Directed by: Derek Williams
- Produced by: Humphrey Swingler
- Edited by: Stephen Collins
- Music by: Wilfred Josephs
- Release date: 1970
- Running time: 30 minutes
- Country: United Kingdom
- Language: English

The Shadow of Progress is a 1970 British short documentary film directed and written by Derek Williams. Produced by Greenpark Productions, it was sponsored by BP.

== Premise ==
The film discusses the paradox of the prospect of technology bringing a richer life, at the same time as it risks destroying the environment.

== Reception ==
She magazine wrote: "This film received a gold award at the British Industrial and Scientific Film Association's 1970 Festival, and is already the recipient of international honours. ... Too polite to mention the root cause, over-population, the film nevertheless deals some shrewd blows at those who accuse us of taking part in European conservation year and letting conservation go by the board. The BP Group has designed factory chimneys to eliminate smuts, and deliberately left them unlicensed and unpatented, so that anyone can build them; car manufacturers are dealing with exhaust pollution; BP have developed a non-toxic oil dispersant for use on beaches, and are concerned to landscape their installations. The film makes us think that perhaps the most important question and one that should be continually asked is, 'What more have you done, since we last asked, to save our environment?' Keep at it and we may yet win."

BFI Screenonline wrote: "1970 was European Conservation Year. Several commemorative industrial documentaries were made (for example, ICI's The Choice), joining a cycle of sponsored films about pollution that was first kicked off by Shell's The River Must Live in 1966. As filmmaking, BP's The Shadow of Progress is much the best entry in this peculiar sub-genre – indeed one of the last really momentous films to come out of the sponsored shorts industry. Multi-award-winning, it was distributed internationally, receiving thousands of non-theatrical bookings and (outside the UK) some cinema screenings. The BBC twice televised it as part of the schedule, as well as reusing it as a trade test transmission."

Russell and Piers Taylor, writing in Shadows of Progress: Documentary Film in Post-War Britain, called the film "a cerebral yet mournful, haunting study of the subject on a broader canvas than ever attempted, thanks to BP's (by documentary standards) blockbusting budget."

== Accolades ==
- Best Short Film, Society of Film and Television Arts, 1970.

== Home media ==
The film is included in the British Film Institute DVD compilation Shadows of Progress: Documentary Film in Post-War Britain 1951–1977.
