= Sarah Erulkar =

Sarah Erulkar at work

Sarah Erulkar (2 May 1923 – 29 May 2015) was an Indian-born Jewish British film director, editor and screenwriter, specialising in sponsored documentary shorts.

== Early years ==
Erulkar was born to Flora and David Erulkar, a Jewish couple in Kolkata, India. Her father was a barrister who was blacklisted for defending Mahatma Gandhi and Mohammed Ali Jinnah. Her family moved to London, England in 1928. She studied sociology at Bedford College.

== Career ==
Erulkar worked in the British film industry for almost forty years (1944-1983), producing over 80 films. She won two prizes at the Venice Film Festival (1952, 1971), while her documentary about the design of postage stamps, Picture to Post (1969), won her her first Best Short Film BAFTA in 1970. Her second would come with The Living City (1977), about her native Kolkata.

Erulkar began her career at the Shell Film Unit, where she had a rapid rise, graduating from scripting and editing Aircraft Today and Tomorrow (1946), to directing the second film she worked on, Flight for Tomorrow (1947). Next she directed Lord Siva Danced (1947), which featured celebrated Indian dancer and choreographer Ram Gopal, and was well received in both India and Britain. Erulkar was forced to leave Shell in 1952 after marrying fellow SFU filmmaker, Peter de Normanville. She would work as a free-lancer for the rest of her long career, first, as an editor at the National Coal Board Film Unit before resuming directing for numerous sponsors, including the British Productivity Council, the Central Office of Information (COI), the Gas Council and the General Post Office (GPO).

Erulker chose not to transition into either television or feature films. Her films covered a breadth of subject matter, including 'women's issues,' and crossed genres: 'from classic documentary, travelogue, and 'trigger' films to children's features, medical training films and public information, as well as the customary swathe of promotional shorts for various commercial bodies.' Birthright, for instance, which she wrote and directed, was the first British short on birth control. Like her British documentary forebears, Erulkar brought a social consciousness to her films.

== Personal life ==
Erulkar was married to science filmmaker Peter de Normanville. They met while working together at the Shell Film Unit; they had two daughters, Siri and Pierrette.

== Partial filmography ==
- Aircraft Today and Tomorrow (1946; SFU)
- Flight for Tomorrow (1947; SFU)
- Lord Siva Danced (1947; SFU)
- New Detergents (1949; SFU)
- Night Hops (1950; SFU)
- The History of the Helicopter (1951; SFU)
- District Nurse (1952; Foreign Office & Commonwealth Relations Office)
- Birthright (1958; Family Planning Association)
- Spat System (1960; GKN sponsor)
- Woman's Work (1961; Samaritan Films)
- Mary Lewis - Student Nurse (1961; Ministry of Health-sponsored COI film)
- Anaesthesia with Methohexitone (1961)
- Depression - Its Diagnosis in General Practice (1963)
- The Smoking Machine (1963)
- Physics and Chemistry of Water (1965)
- Korean Spring (1966: Caltex)
- Something Nice to Eat (1967; Gas Council)
- The Hunch (1967)
- Land of the Red Dragon (1968; British Movietone)
- Picture to Post (1969; GPO)
- Ready for the Road (1970; COI)
- The Air My Enemy (1971; Gas Council)
- Never Go With Strangers (1971; COI)
- The Living City (1977, co-directed with de Normanville)
- Male and Female (1980)
- Teenage Talk-In (1977–82)
- A Disease Called Leprosy (1985)

== Awards ==
- 1952 Venice Film Festival documentary and short film Award for The History of the Helicopter
- 1966 Plate of Venice Film Festival for Physics and Chemistry of Water
- 1967 Writers' Guild of Great Britain Best British Documentary Film or Short Script for The Hunch
- 1970 Short Film BAFTA Award for Picture to Post
- 1971 Medal Award of the Venice Film Festival for The Air My Enemy
- 1978 Best Factual Film BAFTA Award for The Living City

== Sources ==
- Cranston, Ros; McGahan, Katy (2010). "Science and society : Peter de Normanville, Sarah Erulkar". In Russell, Patrick; Piers Taylor, James (eds.). Shadows of progress: documentary film in post-war Britain. Palgrave Macmillan. ISBN 9781844573226.
- Gratza, Agnieszka (5 November 2010). "Shadows of Progress: NS media partnership with the BFI". New Statesman.
- McGahan, Katy. "Erulkar, Sarah (1923–)". BFI Screenonline. Archived from the original on 2 August 2016.
- "Sarah Erulkar". The Times. 13 June 2015.
- Bell, Melanie, (2017-) Histories of Women in British Film and Television website: http://melaniebell.webstarts.com/index.html
- Interview at the British Entertainment History Project
