= Len Rowles =

Film producer

Len Rowles is a producer working in the British film industry.

Rowles' debut film The Man in My Basement premiered September 12, 2025, in the Discovery section at the Toronto International Film Festival. The film was BAFTA long listed in the Outstanding Debut by a Writer, Director or Producer category in January 2026.

Her short films include Skyborn 2012 and Orbit Ever After 2014. The latter starred Thomas Brodie-Sangster and Mackenzie Crook; she was nominated at the BAFTAs for Best Short Film and later at the European Film Awards.

She was a Screen Star of Tomorrow in 2016 and a Moviescope 'One to Watch' in 2012.
