= MV Eurabia Sun =

Dutch-Lebanese cargo ship (1961–1974)

History

Netherlands
- Name: Theron
- Owner: Koninklijke Nederlandsche Stoomboot Maatschappij, (KNSM), Amsterdam
- Port of registry: Lloyd's Register of Shipping (LR)
- Builder: Gebroeders Pot N. V., Bolnes
- Yard number: 942
- Launched: 12 December 1960

Lebanon
- Name: Eurabia Sun
- Namesake: Eurabia Shipping Agency Ltd.
- Owner: Eurabia Shipping Agency Ltd., Beirut
- Acquired: 1974
- Fate: Sunk on 28 October 1974, 10 miles north of Ameland, the Netherlands

General characteristics
- Tonnage: 3,840 GRT
- Length: 119.5 m (392 ft 1 in)
- Beam: 14.9 m (48 ft 11 in)
- Draught: 7.9 m (25 ft 11 in)
- Installed power: 3,600 hp (2,700 kW)
- Propulsion: 2 × 8-cylinder oil engines; 1 screw
- Speed: 16 knots (30 km/h; 18 mph)
- Crew: 28

MV Eurabia Sun, originally named MV Theron, was a 1961 Dutch-built cargo ship of the Koninklijke Nederlandsche Stoomboot Maatschappij. In 1974 it was sold to Lebanese Eurabia Shipping Agency Ltd. On 28 October 1974 while en route from Gdańsk, Poland to Tartous the ship sank near Ameland, the Netherlands, after the ship tilted due to shifting cargo during a gale. All 28 crew members were rescued.

During a 1975 investigation by the Royal Netherlands Navy on the wreck a diver died.

== Ship details ==
The steel ship measured 119.5 metres (392 ft 1 in) by 14.9 m (48.9 ft) by 7.9 m (25.9 ft). She was measured at 3,584 gross register tons (GRT) and a 1,885 net register tons (NRT). She was propelled by two-stroke single-acting eight-cylinder oil engines creating a total of 3,600 horsepower (2,700 kW). She had a speed of 16 knots (30 km/h; 18 mph). She was given the yard number 942 and IMO number 5358725.

== History ==
The ship Theron was built by Gebroeders Pot N. V. in Bolnes, the Netherlands for Koninklijke Nederlandsche Stoomboot Maatschappij, (KNSM). She was launched on 12 December 1960 and delivered on 10 May 1961. Her home port was Amsterdam. In 1966 she was lengthened by Boele's Scheepswerven & Machinefabriek NV. between March and May.

In 1974 the ship was bought by Lebanese company Eurabia Shipping Agency Ltd. and continued sailing under Lebanese flag with home port Beirut. She was renamed Eurabia Sun.

=== Fate ===
In October 1974 she was en route from Gdańsk, Poland to Tartous with a cargo of iron, steel sheet and ammonium nitrate under command of Hussein Ali Hussein. During the night of 28 October there was a gale, with wind of Beaufort scale force 8–9. Due to shifting cargo there came a hole in the ship's hull and the ship started tilting. Captain Houssein Ali Houssein tried to sail to the coast, but failed to do so. The first emergency call received Scheveningen Radio at 3am (local time) when the ship was at the time 10 miles (16 km) north of Ameland, Netherlands. At 6:30am the captain of the ship called that the engines stopped running and wanted to be rescued because the boat was sinking. The ship sunk at around 9am.

25 of the 28 Syrian and Egyptian people on board were able to get into rubber boats. They were rescued about an hour later. 15 people from one rubber boat were picked up by Swedish ship Alabama. The Dutch lifeboat Gebroeders Luden from Lauwersoog picked up the 10 people in the other boat and took over the 15 people on board of the Alabama. The people arrived, soaking wet, at around 11:15am at Lauwersoog. The three remaining people on board of the Eurabia Sun, inclusive the captain, were rescued in the meantime by a helicopter of the Netherlands Naval Aviation Service and brought to Leeuwarden. The crew members were brought to the Zeemanshuis in Amsterdam and later flew home by plane.

The ship sank 10 miles north of Ameland, the Netherlands.

== Wreck ==
=== Navy investigation and death of Rinus Knol ===
In February 1975 a Royal Netherlands Navy diver died during an investigation into the double bottom of the ship. Working in the double bottom is described as "dangerous"; because you have to get through tight spaces. According to a sailor involved in the mission, Knol may have come into contact with hazardous substances, because later divers also surfaced more or less unconscious. During this investigation he was connected according to safety regulations to another diver; who surfaced alone.

In the weeks following the navy had set up a large (search) operation with about 20 divers, a helicopter and an airplane. The operation was complicated by the fuel oil still present on board, which could cause environmental problems tf it were to flow into the sea. After three weeks, his body was still not found.

Newspapers reported that people had questions. It was said that the operation was very large for a search for the body. It was said that the Navy was also doing a drugs investigation.

=== Later dives ===
In the 1980s several people made dives to the wreck. They found that the Navy had blown up the deckhouse and wheelhouse.
