= Picture to Post =

1969 British documentary film by Sarah Erulkar

- Directed by: Sarah Erulkar
- Produced by: John Durst
- Narrated by: Roy Dotrice
- Cinematography: Douglas Ransom
- Edited by: Terence Twigg
- Music by: William Boyce, Thomas Augustine Arne
- Production company: Rayant Pictures
- Release date: 1969
- Running time: 23 min
- Country: Great Britain
- Language: English

Picture to Post is a 1969 documentary film directed by Sarah Erulkar. The film explores the design process of postage stamps and the work of three notable designers, Arnold Machin, Jeffery Matthews and David Gentleman. It was awarded the BAFTA in 1970 for best short documentary film.
