= Sharat Sardana =

British comedy writer, voice artist and producer

- Born: 20 August 1968
- Died: 27 January 2009 (aged 40); London
- Occupation: Writer

Sharat Sardana (20 August 1968 – 27 January 2009) was a British comedy writer, voice artist and producer who worked on TV series including Goodness Gracious Me and The Kumars at No. 42, which won 2 International Emmys.

== Biography ==
The son of first-generation Indian immigrants, he met his future writing partner, Richard Pinto, while attending Forest School, Walthamstow. He graduated in English from Queen Mary and Westfield, University of London (now Queen Mary, University of London), and joined a BBC script editing scheme. He and Richard Pinto became part of the team behind Goodness Gracious Me, first on radio starting in 1996 and on TV from 1998 to 2001. They went on to work as writers for Small Potatoes (1999-2001) and The Kumars at No. 42 (2001–2006).

Sardana was the writer of the BAFTA-nominated short film, Inferno (2001), starring Sanjeev Bhaskar. It won the Best Short Film prize at the 2002 London Sci-Fi Festival. Sardana was also a co-writer of Chopratown (2005) for the BBC, again starring regular collaborator Bhaskar.

Sardana died in 2009 aged 40, in London, from an apparent streptococcus infection.
