= The End of the Road (1976 film) =

1976 British film by John Armstrong

- Directed by: John Armstrong
- Produced by: John Armstrong
- Cinematography: Arthur Wooster
- Edited by: Terence Twigg
- Production company: Pelican Films
- Distributed by: BP
- Release date: 1976
- Running time: 23 minutes
- Country: United Kingdom
- Language: English

The End of the Road (also known as Alaska: The End of the Road) is a 1976 British short documentary film directed by John Armstrong. The film is about BP's Alaska operations, including the construction of the Trans-Alaska Pipeline System.

== Cast ==
- Derek Williams as narrator

== Accolades ==
It was nominated for a 1977 Academy Award for Best Documentary Short.
