= Yousaf Ali Khan =

British film director

Yousaf Ali Khan is a British film director. He wrote and directed Skin Deep (2001), a short film about racism, and Talking With Angels (2003), another short film about a young boy whose mother had schizophrenia, a film that was partly autobiographical and which was nominated for an Oscar. He also directed Angels of Mercy? (2006), a Channel 4 documentary about Keith Mann and the Animal Liberation Front, and Almost Adult (2006), about two teenage girls who emigrate from the Congo and Kenya to the UK.

The Guardian reported in 2005 that he was working on two further films. The Children's House is based on the book by Jewish writer Hetty Verolme, The Children's House of Belsen. Khan himself is a Muslim. His producer, Sanjay Kumar, is a Hindu, and one of the film's major backers is a Palestinian. Some Enchanted Evening, also at the development stage, will explore a mixed-race family growing up in a red light district. In 2010, the script Giant Land, written by Yousaf Ali Khan won a place at the Tribeca Film Festival, and is due to be produced in 2012 with chris richmond, uk production designer.

== Early life ==
Khan was brought up in Salford, Greater Manchester. He lived for a time in the Ellor Street estate before moving to the Langworthy estate. His film Talking with Angels examines his own childhood experience of living there with his mother, who had schizophrenia, through the eyes of a 12-year-old boy, played by local actor Stephen Buckley. There are only four professional actors in the film; most of the casting took place in local schools and community centres.
