= Greenpark Productions =

British documentary film company

Greenpark Productions Ltd is a British documentary film production company, founded by Walter Greenwood in Polperro, Cornwall in 1938. The company relocated to London in 1939. After the war it expanded into making upmarket corporate films. Amongst its roster of directors were Ken Annakin, Ralph Keene and Humphrey Swingler, brother of the poet Randall Swingler.

Greenpark Productions was a founding member of the Film Producers Guild, which set new standards for UK documentary film production. The company, together with its film archive, was acquired in 1977 by David Morphet, an award-winning documentary film producer. Greenpark Productions Ltd is still in business as a film archive, based in Cornwall. (www.greenparkimages.co.uk)

== Filmography ==
This filmography below is a list of films produced or co-produced by Greenpark Productions.

Year	Title	Director	Notes
1943	London 1942	Ken Annakin	Produced in association with Verity Films. View the digitised film on the TIME/IMAGE site.
1943	Spring on the Farm	Ralph Keene	In association with Ministry of Agriculture/ Ministry of Information
1943	Summer on the Farm	Ralph Keene	In association with Ministry of Agriculture/ Ministry of Information
1943	Winter on the Farm	Ralph Keene	In association with Ministry of Agriculture/ Ministry of Information
1943	The Crown of the Year	Ralph Keene	In association with Ministry of Agriculture/ Ministry of Information
1944	The Grassy Shires	Ralph Keene	
1944	Cornish Valley	Ralph Keene	
1944	Crofters	Ralph Keene	In association with Ministry of Agriculture/ Ministry of Information
1944	North-East Corner	John Eldridge	
1945	Make Fruitful the Land	Ken Annakin	
1945	A Farmer's Boy	Peter Price	
1945	Proud City – A Plan for London	Ralph Keene	
1945	We of the West Riding	Ken Annakin	Script by Phyllis Bentley
1946	It began on the Clyde	Ken Annakin	
1946	Cyprus is an Island	Ralph Keene	Script by Laurie Lee
1946	English Criminal Justice	Ken Annakin	"I was lucky, in that I got a picture called English Criminal Justice, which really explained the British system of law and gave me a wonderful break."
1946	Fenlands	Ken Annakin	
1946	United Harvest	Ralph Keene	
1946	Five Towns	Terry Bishop	Sponsored by the Board of Trade
1947	Park Here	John Eldridge]	Script by Laurie Lee. Sponsored by Central Office of Information and Ministry of Town and Country Planning.
1948	Waverley Steps: A Visit to Edinburgh	John Eldridge	Sponsored by Scottish Home Office and Central Office of Information
1949	Three Dawns to Sydney	John Eldridge	
1949	The Frasers of Cabot Cove	Humphrey Swingler	
1949	This Farming Business	Director Unknown	
1950?	Pearl of the Gulf	Director Unknown	with Film Producers' Guild. Sponsored by Bahrein Petroleum Co.
1950	A Bridge in Persia	James McKechnie	
1950	No Man's Friend	Joe Mendoza	
1950	Fifty Acres	Peter Plaskett	
1950	Nines Was Standing	Humphrey Swingler	How coal miners' grievances are dealt with by pit committees.
