= A Fitting Tribute =

- Directed by: Daniel Cormack
- Written by: Ben Clover
- Produced by: Daniel Cormack; Will Briggs
- Starring: Sally Bretton; Thomas Nelstrop; April Nicholson
- Cinematography: Sam Osborne; Daniel Cormack
- Edited by: Gareth Davies; Andy Morrison
- Music by: Andy Simms
- Production companies: Actaeon Films; UK Film Council; Maya Vision International; Lifesize Pictures; Lewisham Film Initiative
- Distributed by: Dazzle Films
- Release date: 20 August 2007 (EIFF)
- Running time: 13 minutes
- Country: United Kingdom
- Language: English

A Fitting Tribute is a 2007 British short film comedy-drama film directed by Daniel Cormack and starring Sally Bretton, Thomas Nelstrop and April Nicholson.

In 2010, A Fitting Tribute was selected for preservation by the British Film Institute's National Archive and in 2012, the film was acquired by the British Library's Moving Image Collection.

== Plot ==
In flashback, Niall (Thomas Nelstrop), a local news reporter, recalls visiting his mother's grave, as he smartens up in a toilet mirror. His colleague Tammy (Sally Bretton) knocks on the toilet door to hurry him up and as they walk to the car she instructs him on the art of the 'death knock': knocking on the doors of the recently bereaved to obtain quotes and pictures of the deceased for the newspaper. Niall's poor track record has put his job on the line and Tammy has been detailed to improve his hit-rate. When they reach the house of Mrs Wright, who has lost her son in a car accident, Niall goes in first while Tammy waits outside. Before Niall can introduce himself and launch into his spiel that Tammy has prepared for him, Mrs Wright (April Nicholson) interrupts him – "I know who you are" – and ushers him into the house. There she ropes him into unstacking the dishwasher as Niall tries in vain to broach the subject of the bereavement against the sound of a fire alarm which has been set off by the cigarette Mrs Wright is smoking. Mrs Wright appears baffled by Niall's requests for pictures and instead offers him some soup telling him they will look at some pictures "in the morning", much to Niall's surprise. She then leads him upstairs to the bedroom and encourages him to get some rest. Trapped in the bedroom, Niall examines the dead boy's belongings and finds himself playing with his toys. Meanwhile, Tammy waits outside taking a phone call from her boss at the newspaper, to whom she explains that Niall "is still in there, so he must be doing alright". Whilst playing with a light sabre, Niall knocks off a shelf-load of items and as he picks them up, he finds a photo of the dead boy. Mrs Wright, alerted by the noise, appears behind him and embracing Niall, she tells him: "it's been a long day: time for bed." Tammy knocks at the door and attempts to talk to Mrs Wright about the accident in which her son was killed, but Mrs Wright replies that her son is in his room and that there must be some mistake. Closing the door, she is nonetheless shaken by Tammy's insistence that her son is dead and she climbs the stairs to the bedroom where she finds Niall tucked up fast asleep in her son's bed. She kisses him on the cheek and switches out the light.

== Cast ==
Sally Bretton was cast as 'Tammy' after the director saw her performance in BBC TV series The Office and A Fitting Tribute was the first short film she had agreed to appear in since leaving drama school: ""The script was really intriguing and the writing flowed very well, plus I knew that Daniel's previous short film (Amelia and Michael) had been really well-received". Bretton was cast alongside "rising star" Thomas Nelstrop with April Nicholson completing the cast after returning to acting following a career break.

== Production ==
April Nicholson (Mrs Wright) prepares for a take on A Fitting Tribute. Photo: Marianne I. van Abbe

The screenplay for the film was partly based on Ben Clover's real-life experiences of death-knocks as a reporter for the South London Press and production started after the project won a funding award from the Lewisham Film Initiative with Will Briggs, stepson of the comedian Malcolm Hardee, acting as co-producer.

Filming was completed on the day of the deadline for the UK Film Council Completion Fund which "provides finance and support for short films that show outstanding potential but lack the funds to finish." Despite being only a rough assembly, the film won a completion funding award: "the completion fund was what we wanted the most really...it's actually, apart from Cinema Extreme, the only nationwide UK Film Council short film funding scheme. It has a massive profile here at Edinburgh...It's a brilliant scheme to get on."

A Super 8mm intro sequence, self-shot by the director Daniel Cormack on the then recently discontinued Kodachrome film stock, was added subsequent to principal photography.

== Release ==
=== Festivals ===
In addition to a short theatrical run before the feature presentations at the Broadway Theatre and the First Past the Post screenings at the Curzon Mayfair, A Fitting Tribute screened on the festival circuit from its world première at the Edinburgh International Film Festival, US première at the Palm Springs Shorts Fest and European première at the A-list Warsaw International Film Festival in 2007 through to 2009 having been selected for the British Council's International Short Film Festival Support Scheme.

Edition	Festival	Programme title	Venue	Date	Time	Country	Première status
61st	Edinburgh International Film Festival	First Past the Post	Cameo cinema, Screen 1	20 August 2007	14:00	UK	World
13th	Palm Springs International Festival of Short Films	Showdown	Camelot Theaters, Theater 2	28 August 2007	14:30	USA	USA
23rd	Warsaw International Film Festival	Short Films 1	Palace of Culture and Science, Kinoteka 7	18 October 2007; 20 October 2007	11:00; 13:30	Poland	Polish
8th	X'08 International Disability Film Festival	Director's Showcase: Daniel Cormack	BFI Southbank, Studio	15 February 2008	15:50	UK	
2nd	Shooting People Split Focus at the BFI	Split Focus: Daniel Cormack / Kara Miller	BFI Southbank, Studio	10 March 2008	18:00	UK	
14th	Bradford Film Festival	New British Filmmakers	National Media Museum, Pictureville Cinema	14 March 2008	16:00	UK	
6th	Wood Green International Short Film Festival	Drama Session One	Cineworld Wood Green, Screen 3	18 April 2008	21:30	UK	
5th	The End of the Pier International Film Festival	Short Drama Competition: Director's Special Mention	Regis Centre, Alexandra Theatre	3 May 2008	14:00	UK	
8th	Nickel Independent Film Festival	Film Screening	LSPU Hall, Theatre	24 June 2008	19:30	Canada	Canadian
1st	Swale Film Festival	Industry Q&A Session	Avenue Theatre, Cinema	11 July 2008	18:00	UK	
13th	Portobello Film Festival	London Filmmakers Convention – Day 2	Paradise Bar, Private Dining Room	3 September 2008	18:00	UK	
4th	Busho Budapest Short Film Festival	Informational Screening 1		4 September 2008	12:00	Hungary	Hungarian
16th	Raindance Film Festival	Prior to the feature presentation of Goliath	Cineworld Shaftesbury Avenue, Screen 7	5 October 2008	19:00	UK	
9th	HDFest NYC	Prior to the feature presentation of Foreign Devils	Sony Wonder Technology Lab	19 October 2008	19:30	USA	
9th	Filmstock International Film Festival	Short Film Weekend 10	The hat Factory, Screen One; The hat Factory, Basement	9 November 2008; 9 November 2008	16:00; 18:10	UK	
7th	Notting Hill Film Festival	Short Films Six	Odeon Kensington, Screen 2	12 July 2009; 13 July 2009; 16 July 2009	19:00; 11:00; 11:00	UK	

== Reception ==
=== Critical response ===
Natascha Kaufman of Time Out London reviewed the First Past the Post theatrical screening of the UK Film Council Completion Fund slate at the Curzon Mayfair:

"A gripping collection of nine short films that all project an effective message with a shower of creativity and originality. Each film possesses a unique quality to touch and captivate with a lasting impression in no more than 15 minutes...'A Fitting Tribute' is a satirical story about a young journalist who is confronted with an unusual circumstance when he meets a grieving mother. Akin to the standard of directing the acting too is a far cry from amateur; nine little gems that all twinkle with artistic imagination."

=== Accolades ===
Rank	Award	Awarding body	Nominee	Year
Winner	Emerging Filmmaker Award	Nickel Independent Film Festival	Daniel Cormack	2008
Winner	Best Story / Screenplay Award	Nickel Independent Film Festival	Ben Clover	2008

== See also ==
- Amelia and Michael
- Make Me a Tory
- Nightwalking
