= Amelia and Michael =

- Directed by: Daniel Cormack
- Written by: Stephen Betts
- Produced by: Daniel Cormack; Matt Gunner
- Starring: Anthony Head; Natasha Powell
- Cinematography: Merritt Gold
- Edited by: Gareth Davies
- Music by: Nick Loe
- Production companies: Actaeon Films; Fortune Films
- Distributed by: Network Ireland Television
- Release date: 24 August 2007 (Montréal World Film Festival)
- Running time: 11 minutes
- Country: United Kingdom
- Language: English

Amelia and Michael is a 2007 British drama short film directed by Daniel Cormack, starring Anthony Head and Natasha Powell and executive produced by Richard Johns.

In 2010, Amelia and Michael was selected for preservation by the British Film Institute's National Archive and was archived by the British Universities Film and Video Council as part of their Television and Radio Index for Learning and Teaching (TRILT). In 2012, the film was acquired by the British Library's Moving Image Collection.

== Plot ==
Amelia (Natasha Powell) and Michael (Anthony Head), a smartly dressed middle aged couple, sit in silence in the back of a chauffeur-driven sedan as it pulls up at the lights beside a motorcycle. Arriving outside a restaurant, Amelia kisses Michael goodbye and walks towards the entrance. When the sedan is out of sight, Amelia removes her wedding ring and hails a cab to an alternative destination. Back in his office, Michael is interrupted by his colleague Francis (Julian Lee) in the middle of booking an anniversary meal and hotel room for Friday. On Friday morning, Michael leaves for a business trip to Milan, giving Amelia some flowers before he departs. Once he has gone, Amelia travels to the hospital bedside of an incapacitated young man on whose table is a photo of Amelia and the man astride a motorcycle. Meeting with a consultant afterwards she signs consent forms for his care. Meanwhile, Michael is not in Milan, but at the restaurant he booked the previous day where he meets a call-girl who he later sleeps with in his hotel room. Restlessly trying to sleep after she leaves, he is interrupted by a phone call from Francis, who has discovered his whereabouts in order to urgently discuss 'the Thompson case'. Michael returns home the next morning and exchanges pleasantries with Amelia whilst opening his post, before taking a bath. While tidying away the opened mail, Amelia discovers Michael's unused passport in a kitchen drawer, but before she can confront him, she receives a phone call from the hospital. Dashing to the bedside of the incapacitated man, she arrives too late; discovering the man has died and the nurses are changing the sheets in preparation for the next patient. Returning home that evening, she bursts into tears. Michael – who has discovered his passport out on the kitchen table and believes he has been caught out – assumes she is upset at his infidelity. He apologises and embraces Amelia, who does not reveal the true cause of her upset. In the final scene, Amelia and Michael sit in silence in the sedan as a motorcycle pulls up beside them at the lights.

== Cast ==
Anthony Head agreed to appear in the film despite the fact that he "didn't know [the producers] from Adam" and even waived his fee, telling Hotdog that "the script was really nice and basically it was one of those deals where you can do something helpful for somebody...if I can help somebody – and usually the problem is time – then why not?...So you know if I can give them my time I'm going learn as much from them as they are from me." The film was shot concurrently with Head's appearance as Jeff Golding in Simon Gray's Otherwise Engaged at the Criterion Theatre in London's West End with Head commenting that "[Amelia and Michael] was incredibly professionally put together, they were a really good crew and they got me in and out as quickly as they could, which was perfect."

== Production ==
Daniel Cormack (left) directing Anthony Head on location in London in Amelia and Michael. Photo: Marianne I. van Abbe

The film went into production while its director Daniel Cormack was working at the box office of the Electric Cinema and was receiving hardship funding from the Cinema and Television Benevolent Fund. Having received an initial allocation of funds from Hammersmith and Fulham's media support agency Focus West, Daniel Cormack went on to gain funding from his boss at the Electric Cinema, and Soho House founder, Nick Jones among others.

The film was shot on a relatively low budget and saved money by making extensive use of product placement, securing free goods and services from Jaguar Cars, Bupa, the Royal Park Hotel, Margaret Howell and the West Cornwall Pasty Company. As a result, it was the subject of a case study at the Encounters Film Festival during the panel discussion Brands and Filmmakers: "in essence [Daniel Cormack] just smiled sweetly, asked for favors as he went along, and got them" although using genuine expensive brands ran into problems "when he found himself pondering the use of real diamonds rather than fakes" before realising that the "hundreds of thousands of pounds worth" of jewellery would have to be insured and that costume jewellery would easily suffice. Nonetheless, as Anthony Head noted: "Amelia and Michael was a learning curve for director and producers and by the time we finished they had made really good use of the facilities they managed to blag. I love it when something feels that vibrant and that close to the root of things, when it hasn't got a lot of money thrown at it, and it's edgy."

Both Anthony Head and Daniel Cormack remarked on how supportive the crew were of their debut director during filming. Head commented: "once he got into the groove and realised how supportive his crew were, he got into it and he was great, really good." Cormack later told the BECTU journal Stage, Screen and Radio: "I made the film as a total novice whose only experience of film production was from reading books and whose only qualification to be a director was a love of film. Luckily I had a very talented and experienced crew around me and Amelia and Michael was a great success".

Though shot in 2005, post-production was not completed until 2007. An unfinished version was shortlisted for the Akira Kurosawa Memorial Short Film Competition in 2006.

== Release ==
=== Festivals ===
In addition to a short theatrical run before the feature presentations at the Broadway Theatre, Amelia and Michael screened on the festival circuit from its world premiere at the A-list Montréal World Film Festival in 2007 through to 2010.

Edition	Festival	Programme Title	Venue	Date	Time	Country	Première Status
31st	Montréal World Film Festival	Focus on World Cinema	Quartier Latin Cineplex, Theater 14	24 August 2007; 24 August 2007; 28 August 2007	14:30; 21:20; 11:10	Canada	World
11th	LA Shorts Fest	Programme 67	AMC Burbank Town Center 6, Theater 2	12 September 2007	15:00	USA	USA
15th	Raindance Film Festival	The Romantics	Cineworld Shaftesbury Avenue, Screen 4	4 October 2007	16:30	UK	UK
8th	X'08 International Disability Film Festival	Director's Showcase: Daniel Cormack	BFI Southbank, Studio	15 February 2008	15:50	UK	
2nd	Shooting People Split Focus at the British Film Institute	Split Focus: Daniel Cormack / Kara Miller	BFI Southbank, Studio	10 March 2008	18:00	UK	
14th	Bradford Film Festival	Prior to the feature presentation of Sleuth	National Media Museum, Pictureville Cinema	13 March 2008	10:30	UK	
6th	Wood Green International Short Film Festival	Drama Session Two	Cineworld Wood Green, Screen 3	19 April 2008	18:45	UK	
5th	The End of the Pier International Film Festival	Short Drama Competition: Director's Nominations	Regis Centre, Alexandra Theatre	26 April 2008	19:30	UK	
8th	Nickel Independent Film Festival	Film Screening	LSPU Hall, Theatre	28 June 2008	19:30	Canada	
6th	Super Shorts International Film Festival	Short Film Screenings: Official Selection	Odeon Covent Garden, Screen 2	5 July 2008	17:00	UK	
13th	One Reel Film Festival	Love and Marriage	SIFF Cinema, Nesholm Family Lecture Hall, Marion Oliver McCaw Hall, Seattle Center	31 August 2008	16:30	USA	
13th	Portobello Film Festival	London Filmmakers Convention – Day 2	Paradise Bar, Private Dining Room	3 September 2008	18:00	UK	
4th	Berwick Film and Media Arts Festival	International Shorts	The Maltings Theatre & Cinema	29 November 2008	17:00	UK	
7th	Notting Hill Film Festival	Shorts Seven / Shorts Ten	Odeon Kensington, Screen 2	10 July 2009; 11 July 2009; 12 July 2009; 13 July 2009; 15 July 2009; 16 July 2009	19:30; 20:00; 20:30; 20:00; 12:30; 14:00	UK	
3rd	Limelight Film & Arts Awards	Best Visual category	Troxy, Main Auditorium	8 July 2010	18:30	UK	

=== Broadcast ===
In 2010, Amelia and Michael was broadcast on Channel 4 as part of "a series of short original films produced by a variety of talented writers and directors"; the first time in over 8 years that Channel 4 had acquired and broadcast independent short films.

== Reception ==
=== Critical response ===
Reviews focused on the acting, production values and pacing of the film, as well as its ambiguous ending. Jeff Shannon of The Seattle Times commented on the "fine acting and first rate production values." Hotdog remarked that "this short is beautifully shot, gently taking its time to unfold, and the presence of actors like stage and screen veteran Head really raises the bar a notch", concluding that "despite the sombre subject matter, there's a strange comfort to be found in the final minute of the film" and that "on this evidence, Cormack is a young director to watch." Paul Strange called the film "a delight" and "intriguing" and made it a drama 'Pick of the Day' on DigiGuide stating: "Nicely observed by director Daniel Cormack, both Powell and Head are super here, and the drama leaves you wanting a lot more, which is terrific. Highly recommended." Expanding on the theme of ambiguity and the indeterminate ending, Abigail Lelliot of Time Out London observed that "Anthony Head packs an emotional punch in this pacey drama" and that in spite of "some slightly clichéd compositions...the direction succinctly navigates the twists of the plot to a gratifyingly ambiguous conclusion." In addition to noting the "great performances", "beautiful photography" and "real sense of cinema", Shooting People's Ben Blaine picked up on the film's European sensibility, reflecting that "it felt very European, like one of those films in which Daniel Auteuil and Juliette Binoche fall in love and break up, one of those films that somehow, as a rule, we can't do in this country. With this well cast, well acted, well made film Daniel Cormack seems therefore to be breaking all the rules without breaking sweat or showing off."

Judi Dench, who supported the production of the film, described it as "beautiful" and said that its director was "destined for great things."

=== Accolades ===
Amelia and Michael has a rating of 7.9 out of 10 from IMDb's top 1,000 voters.

Rank	Award	Awarding Body	Nominee	Year
Winner	Tiscali Short Film Award	Raindance Film Festival	Daniel Cormack	2007
Winner	Emerging Filmmaker Award	Nickel Independent Film Festival	Daniel Cormack	2008
Winner	Wessex Heartbeat Award for Best Screenplay	The End of the Pier International Film Festival	Stephen Betts	2008
Nominated	Best Visual Award	Limelight Film & Arts Awards	Daniel Cormack	2010
Shortlisted	Akira Kurosawa Memorial Short Film Competition	Akira Kurosawa Foundation	Daniel Cormack	2006
Shortlisted	Best British Short Film	British Independent Film Awards	Daniel Cormack	2007

== See also ==
- A Fitting Tribute
- Make Me a Tory
- Nightwalking
