= Neo Naturists =

Performance artist collective

The Neo Naturists is a performance based live art practice started during the early 1980s in London, UK.

== History ==
The Neo Naturists were started by Christine Binnie, Jennifer Binnie, and Wilma Johnson in 1981 in London. Grayson Perry appeared in many performances. Their performance at the Hayward Gallery in June 2012 was the first time the three main founders had performed together since 1986. There were many performances in the interim years. They had a major retrospective exhibition in 2016.

In the world of urban Thatcherism The Neo Naturists created provocative performances to mixed reactions. They challenged the highly fashionable Blitz Kids of the early 1980s by creating performances which brought smudged body paint, nudity, cooking, fish fingers, pancakes, calor gas, modern hunter gatherer carrier bags, bosoms, patchouli, sweat and messy exuberance into the heart of the self-conscious New Romantic club scene. Their work brought the aesthetics and vision of William Blake and Samuel Palmer, Cecil Collins and neo-romanticism of the 1940s into direct collision with the slick gesturing of New Image painting and neo-expressionism.

The Neo Naturists subtextually, used their own female bodies in the context of the, often gay and exquisitely dandyesque, club scene, such as The Blitz, to play with feminist sexuality issues and sexual politics. As living, naked paintings they performed ancient and modern rituals, everyday actions and rituals on stages lit like kitchens. They juxtaposed ritual action with ‘common sense’ to create messy exuberant happenings.

The Neo Naturists have an intention to become Neo Naturist octogenarians and to continue performing with body paint on, into their 80s.

== Timeline ==
- 2006 – Neo Naturist Archive, B2, My Dead Gallery, London
- 2006 – Neo Naturist Archive, Secret Public, Kunstverein München
- 2007 – Neo Naturist Archive, Secret Public, Institute of Contemporary Arts (ICA), London
- 2007 – Neo Naturist Archive England and Co, London
- 2008 – Neo Naturist Films Derek Jarman Super 8 film festival, The Gate Notting Hill and Ritzy Brixton
- 2011 – Neo Naturist Archive, Camulodurum, First Site, Colchester
- 2012 – Neo Naturist Films, Camulodruum, First Site, Colchester
- 2012 – Neo Naturist Films, ICA, London
- 2012 – Neo Naturist Life Class, Hayward Wide Open School
- 2012 – Neo Naturist Films taken into BFI Collection
