= UK Film Council Completion Fund =

The UK Film Council Completion Fund is a major UK short film funding awards scheme, funded by the UK Film Council, and managed by Maya Vision International. Originally a £50,000 fund awarded on an annual basis to a slate of 8-10 film, from 2008 onwards the fund has been increased to £70,000 to be awarded on a bi-annual basis to around 14 films of the most promising UK short films "that have already been shot but lack the funds to finish".

== Screenings ==
At the scheme's launch in 2002, the 2003 slate of films were co-funded by Film4 Productions' Filmfour Lab and screened on Channel 4, Film 4 and a selection are still available on the Film 4 website. After the winding down of Film Four Ltd as a separate entity and the scaling down and re-integration of film production into Channel 4 drama in 2002, the UK Film Council took over sole funding of the completion fund. Since 2004, the finished films have played at the Edinburgh International Film Festival in a section called First Past the Post and also have a central London showcase at the Curzon Mayfair. A selection of the films are available to screen on the BBC Film Network.

== Archive ==
The UK Film Council takes delivery of a Digibeta copy of each film for preservation in its national archive in Sheffield and DVD copies are stored by the Edinburgh International Film Festival as part of the Film UK Guide to British Film archive.

== Awards and nominations ==
Completion fund films have been official selections at numerous film festivals worldwide, gathering over 150 major international awards, and many more nominations, including:

- Nominated BAFTA Award for Best Short Film 2010 Off Season
- Nominated BAFTA Award for Best Short Film 2009 Ralph
- Winner Short Film - Prix UIP Cracow 2007 Dad
- Nominated European Film Awards Short Film – Prix UIP 2007 Dad
- Winner 60th Edinburgh International Film Festival Best British Short 2006 The Other Man
- Winner BAFTA Award for Best Short Film 2006 Antonio's Breakfast
- Nominated BAFTA Award for Best Short Film 2005 Lucky
- Nominated British Independent Film Awards Best British Short 2005 Pitch Perfect
- Runner Up TCM Classic Shorts Film Competition 2005 The Clap
- Nominated British Independent Film Awards Best British Short 2004 6.6.04

== 2009(I) ==
- Screening: 63rd Edinburgh International Film Festival: Filmhouse, Sunday 19 June 2009, 11:30am

Film	Director(s)	Producer(s)	Writer(s)	Recipient	Date	Award
Bale (formerly known as Hay Bales)	Al Mackay	Andrew Ryder	Al Mackay	Elephant Gun Films	25/03/2009	£7,600
The Elemental	Robert Sproul-Cran	Katie Crook	Robert Sproul-Cran	Northlight Productions Ltd	25/03/2009	£7,120
Together	Eicke Bettinga	Zorana Piggott	Eicke Bettinga, Zorana Piggott	001 Productions Ltd, Piggott-Bettinga Filmproduktion GbR	25/03/2009	£6,730
The Hardest Part	Oliver Refson	Adam Shakinovsky	Oliver Refson	Agile Films Ltd	25/03/2009	£2,500
The Chapel	Ben Winter	Ben Winter	Ben Winter	No Papercuts Ltd	25/03/2009	£3,785
Furnace Four	Haydn Butler	Vanessa Arden-Wood	Ali Muriel		25/03/2009	£4,685

== 2008(II) ==
- London Screening: 6th London Short Film Festival, Institute of Contemporary Arts, Friday 16 January 2009, 6.30pm

Film	Director(s)	Producer(s)	Writer(s)	Recipient	Date	Award
The Devil's Wedding	Dan Cadan	Loren Slater	Dan Cadan	H.S.I London	22/10/2008	£7,000
The Wake	Loren Slater & Kerry Kolbe	Loren Slater & Kerry Kolbe	Loren Slater & Kerry Kolbe	Signal Films	22/10/2008	£5,800
The Appointment	J Blakeson	Sacha Guttenstein	J Blakeson		22/10/2008	£8,575
Girl Like Me (formerly known as Wasted)	Rowland Jobson	Zoe Webster, Peter Devonald and Rowland Jobson	Peter Devonald	Seefood Ltd	22/10/2008	£8,850

== 2008(I) ==
- London Screening: Curzon Mayfair, Thursday 23 October 2008, 7pm
- 62nd Edinburgh International Film Festival Screening: Filmhouse, Wednesday 25 June 2008, 5:15pm

Film	Director(s)	Producer(s)	Writer(s)	Recipient	Date	Award
Dead Dog	Edward Jeffreys	Loren Slater, Kerry Kolbe	Edward Jeffreys	Signal Films	12/03/2008	£4,270
Domestics	Rob Curry	Colin McKeown	Anthony Fletcher	Fifth Column Films Ltd	12/03/2008	£5,975
Hatemail	Frazer Churchill	Mark Murrell	Frazer Churchill	2FC Ltd	12/03/2008	£6,600
The Hero's Journey (formerly known as The End of the Affair)	Jack Herbert	Barrington Robinson	Jack Herbert	Redbag Pictures Ltd	12/03/2008	£4,975
Ralph	Alex Winckler	Olivier Kaempfer	Alex Winckler	Parkville Pictures Ltd	12/03/2008	£5,800
Unborn	Justin Trefgarne	Francine Heywood, Laura Giles, Ernest Riera, Sarah Parfitt	Justin Trefgarne	Trinamite Productions Ltd	12/03/2008	£4,955

== 2007 ==
- London Screening: Curzon Mayfair, Thursday 11 October 2007, 6.30pm
- 61st Edinburgh International Film Festival Screening: Cameo Cinema, Monday 20 August 2007, 2pm

Film	Director(s)	Producer(s)	Writer(s)	Recipient	Date	Award
A Fitting Tribute	Daniel Cormack	Daniel Cormack	Ben Clover	Actaeon Films Ltd		£5,000
Church Going	Ashley Inglis, Russell Inglis	Ashley Inglis, Russell Inglis, Daniel Swain	Ashley Inglis, Russell Inglis	Russell Inglis		£4,100
Walking Away	Joanna Carrick	David Newborn	Joanna Carrick	Red Rose Chain Ltd		£6,000
Beyond	Gavin Boyter	Gavin Boyter	Gavin Boyter	Strange Attractor Films Ltd		£5,920
Juvenile	China Moo-Young	Jess Ensor	Glenn Doherty	Wanted Films Ltd		£6,500
One of Us	Clint Dyer	Julian Bennett, Mark Straker	Mark Straker	PK Films Ltd		£4,880
Writing Dachau	Genevieve Simms	Genevieve Simms	Genevieve Simms	Genevieve Simms		£2,409
Jehovah's Witness	Alain Kramer	Alain Kramer	Alain Kramer	NoZone Films Ltd		£4,000
Airlock, or How to Say Goodbye in Space	Chris Boyle	Laura Tunstall	Mike Lesslie	Laura Tunstall		£3,115

== 2006 ==
- London Screening: Curzon Mayfair, Thursday 5 October 2006 at 18:30
- 60th Edinburgh International Film Festival Screening: Cameo Cinema, Tuesday 22 August 2006

Film	Director(s)	Producer(s)	Writer(s)	Recipient	Date	Award
Savage	Hannah Gal	Hannah Judah	Hannah Gal	Hannah Gal	29/3/06	£4,499
Normal For Norfolk	Gareth Lewis	Adrian Sturges, Damian Lewis		Picture Farm Ltd	15/3/06	£7,750
Dog Flap	Jack Herbert	Wendy Bevan-Mogg		Kubista Ltd	15/3/06	£5,800
Exit the Situation	Lilja Ingolfsdottir	Jeremy Campbell		Balfe Campbell Productions Ltd	15/3/06	£7,935
The Sofa	Marcus Shepherd	Teun Hilte, Jonathan Taylor		Clockwork Pictures	15/3/06	£5,380
Dad	Daniel Mulloy	Amber T-Finlayson, Verity Wislocki	Daniel Mulloy	Sister Films Ltd	22/3/06	£5,500
The Other Man	Dictynna Hood	Simon Onwurah	Dictynna Hood	Likely Story Ltd	15/3/06	£7,500
Kochana Café	Philip Illic	Elisabeth Charbonneau		Elisabeth Charbonneau	15/3/06	£5,290
100th of a Second	Susan Jacobson	Alex Boden		Pistachio Pictures	15/3/06	£5,930
In the Mood	Hannah Robinson	Jeremy Redhouse, Jonathan Hall		Redhouse Lane / Perfect World	22/3/06	£2,425

== 2005 ==
- London Screening: Curzon Mayfair, Thursday 31 October 2005 at 18:30
- 59th Edinburgh International Film Festival Screening: Cameo Cinema
- 11th Bristol International Short Film Festival (Brief Encounters) Screening: Watershed Cinema 1, Friday 25 November 2005 at 17:30
- 11th Bristol International Short Film Festival (Brief Encounters) Screening: Watershed Cinema 1, Saturday 26 November 2005 at 11:45

Film	Director(s)	Producer(s)	Writer(s)	Recipient	Date	Award
Lucky	Avie Luthra	Bex Hopkins	Avie Luthra	Avie Luthra	2/3/2005	£6,245
The Little Thief	Adam Sharp	Simon Cornish		BAF Animation	2/3/05	£4,510
Pitch Perfect	J Blakeson	Sacha Guttenstein		Sacha Guttenstein	2/3/05	£8,510
Mockingbird	Joe Tunmer	Ben Timlett, Penny Nagle, Richard Landy		Bill and Ben Productions	2/3/05	£7,230
Antonio's Breakfast	Daniel Mulloy	Howard Stogdon, Amber T-Finlayson		Sister Films	2/3/05	£5,950
Starry Night	Ben Miller	Thomas M. Fickling, Rebecca Farhall		Thomas M. Fickling	2/3/05	£6,990
The Clap	Geoff Lindsey	Hugh Welchman, Alan Dewhurst		Breakthru Films Ltd	2/3/05	£4,203
Rare Books and Manuscripts	Bruce Webb	Wendy Bevan-Mogg, Elisabeth Pinto		Sister Films Ltd	2/3/05	£5,640

== 2004 ==
- 58th Edinburgh International Film Festival Screening: Cameo Cinema 1, on Friday 27 August 2004 at 14:00

Film	Director(s)	Producer(s)	Writer(s)	Recipient	Date	Award
Mercy	Candida Scott Knight	Emily Man	Tina Walker	Maya Vision International Ltd	3/3/04	£7,800
No Deposit, No Return	Dallas Campbell	Farah Abushwesha, Pippa Mitchell, Kerry Appleyard	Dallas Campbell, John Edwards	Rocliffe Ltd	3/3/04	£4,360
6.6.04	Simon Hook	Andrew Wilson	Simon Hook, Jayne Kirkham	Andrew Wilson	3/3/04	£1,939
Bushido: The Way of the Warrior	Susan Jacobson	Alex Boden	Susan Jacobson, Anna Reeves	Pistachio Pictures Ltd	3/3/04	£3,386
Jamaica	Martin Scanlan	Mark Norfolk, Jacquie Beaumont	Martin Scanlan	Prussia Lane Productions Ltd	3/3/04	£6,947
Flowers and Coins	Joshua Neale	Joshua Neale, Neil Henry	Neil Henry, Joshua Neale	Joshua Neale	3/3/04	£3,740
Moving On	Albert Kodagolian	Albert Kodagolian	Dusan Tolmac	Albert Kodagolian	3/3/04	£6,504
Stalin, My Neighbour	Carol Morley	Cairo Cannon	Carol Morley	Cannon and Morley Productions Ltd	3/3/04	£5,750
Hotel Infinity	Amanda Boyle	Adrian Sturges	Amanda Boyle	Picture Farm Ltd	3/3/04	£9,549
Traffic Warden	Donald Rice	Teun Hilte	Donald Rice	Clockwork Pictures Ltd	3/3/04	£6,947

== 2003 ==
London Screening: Curzon Soho, Monday 7 April 2003 at 6pm

Film	Director(s)	Producer(s)	Writer(s)	Recipient	Date	Award
Jetpac Willy	David Palmer			Lithium Films Ltd	4/9/02	£3,000
Cracks	Joelle Berbe			Cracking Film Productions	20/11/02	£3,500
The Day of the Subgenius	Chris Hopewell	Andy Leighton		Bolex Brothers	16/7/03	£1,250
Whacked!	Jake West	Sarah Townsend		Haylon Films	4/9/02	£2,500
List 3	D.W. Mault	Sal Papadopolous		Hurricane Films	20/11/02	£4,500
F2point8	Paul Hills	Carole Hayman	Carole Hayman	Provocative Pictures	18/12/02	£2,500
Friday Night In	Ruth Coulson	Ruth Coulson, Kevin Kolovich		Rumour Productions	20/11/02	£4,000
Divine	Angela M. Murray	Rebecca Knapp		Synergen Films	18/12/02	£2,500
Ozone	Nicholas Brooks, Laura Kelly	Nicholas Brooks, Laura Kelly		Nicholas Brooks, Laura Kelly	20/11/02	£6,164
