= Akira Kurosawa Memorial Short Film Competition =

Short film awards ceremony

th Grand Prix, Second Place, Honourable Mention, Final Work Prize, Incentive Award
- Site: Asahi Hall (2004–05), Yurakucho, Tokyo (2006, 2007)
- Hosted by: Akira Kurosawa Foundation

Highlights
- Best Film: The Kitchen, Ben Ferrisotomi (2004–05); William Henne (2006); Grapefruit Jelly, Kyoko Sato (2007)

The Akira Kurosawa Memorial Short Film Competition is a major international short film awards ceremony, run by the Akira Kurosawa Foundation. Since the inaugural 2004–2005 competition, the Grand Prix and numerous other prizes have been awarded on an annual basis.

== 2007 ==
The Akira Kurosawa Memorial Short Film Competition 2007 Final Round and Award Ceremony was held in Yurakucho, Tokyo on Sunday, January 13, 2008.

Rank	Film	Director(s)	Country	Prize
Grand Prix	Grapefruit Jelly	Kyoko Sato	Japan	¥2,000,000
Second Place (Saga Prefecture Governor Award)	Londres – London	Eva Tang	Singapore	¥1,000,000
Second Place (Rikkyo University Award)	Registration	Seiya Sato	Japan	¥1,000,000
Honourable Mention	Amor autoadhesivo	Leticia Christoph / Pablo Barbieri	Argentina	¥500,000
Fine Work Prize	Two	Kristopher Gee / Sean Rochin	U.S. / Canada	¥500,000
Incentive Award	Majidee	Azharr Rudin	Malaysia	¥200,000
Incentive Award	Test	Duangtat Hansupanusorn	Thailand	¥200,000

== 2006 ==
The Akira Kurosawa Memorial Short Film Competition 2006 Final Round and Award Ceremony was held in Yurakucho, Tokyo on Friday 17 November 2006.

Rank	Film	Director(s)	Country	Prize
Grand Prix	otomi	William Henne	Belgium	¥2,000,000
Second Place (Saga Prefecture Governor Award)	Left	Alexandre Philippe	United States	¥1,000,000
Second Place (Rikkyo University Award)	Passing Moments	Toshiharu Yaegashi	Japan	¥1,000,000
Honourable Mention	Pillow Talk	Araya Suriharn	Thailand	¥500,000
Honourable Mention	The War Next Door	Peter Politzer	Hungary	¥500,000
Honourable Mention	The Room 316	William Tan (director)	Japan	¥500,000
Incentive Award	Bokyo	Hiroki Butsugan	Japan	¥200,000
Incentive Award	usotuki yumichan	Masaki Miyamoto	Japan	¥200,000
Incentive Award	Passenger	Green Zeng	Singapore	¥200,000
Incentive Award	Sister Moonlight	Shigeaki Kobayashi	Japan	¥200,000
Nominated	Meaningful Touches	Sarah Steel	Australia	
Nominated	Tulips for Daisy	Michael Dominic	United States	
Nominated	All That You Want	Per Hanefjord	Sweden	
Nominated	The Life	Jin Ho Ryu	South Korea	
Shortlisted	Blind Spot	Kiyoshi Nagahama	United States	
Shortlisted	Amelia and Michael	Daniel Cormack	United Kingdom	
Shortlisted	di （little brother）	Leong huat kam	Singapore	
Shortlisted	Brothers	John Altobello III	United States	
Shortlisted	My Scarlet Letter	Karen Dee Carpenter	United States	
Shortlisted	Look at Me	Chawalit Khanawutikarn	Thailand	
Shortlisted	Latent Sorrow	Shon Kim	United States	
Shortlisted	Positive	Ash Nukui	United States	
Shortlisted	Between Us	T. Arthur Cottam	United States	
Shortlisted	Paris 1951	Jasmin Gordon	United States	
Shortlisted	Film Diary	David Borengasser	United States	
Shortlisted	Yonin	Ken Makio	Singapore	

== 2004–2005 ==
The Akira Kurosawa Memorial Short Film Competition 2004–2005 Final Round and Award Ceremony was held in the Asahi Hall (Yurakucho Marion Build. 12F) on 4 September 2005.

Rank	Film	Director(s)	Country	Prize
Grand Prix	The Kitchen	Ben Ferris	Australia	¥2,000,000
Second Place (Saga Prefecture Governor Award)	Making Life Work	Maximilian Jezo-Parovsky	United States	¥1,000,000
Second Place (Rikkyo University Award)	Nagi	Takatoshi Arai	Japan	¥1,000,000
Incentive Award	Hi No Tsugi Ha Rekishi	Inan Oener	Japan	¥300,000
Incentive Award	Hanzubon No Ojisan	Kota Nagaoka	Japan	¥300,000
Incentive Award	Dirty Work Blues	Satoko Okita	Japan	¥300,000
