= Living Staff Living Wage =

Industrial action dispute at Picturehouse cinemas

- Living Staff Living Wage / A Living Wage For Ritzy Staff
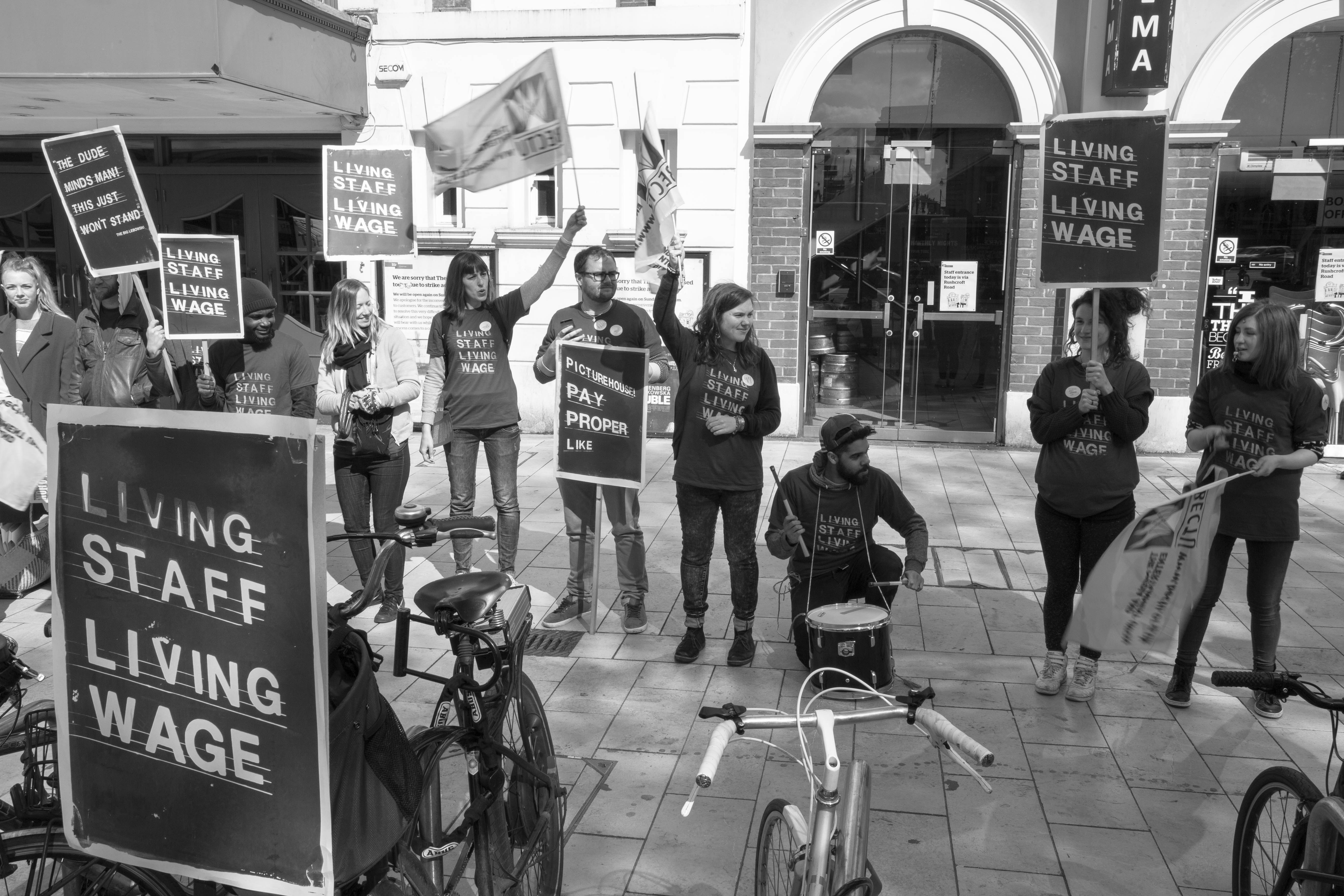
- Workers at the Ritzy Cinema, Brixton, striking in 2014
- Merged into: Living Staff Living Wage
- Founded: 2014
- Location: Brixton

The Living Staff Living Wage campaign is an umbrella term for the organised workers behind industrial actions at Picturehouse Cinemas in the United Kingdom since 2014.

It is an expansion of the ongoing Ritzy Living Wage campaign, initiated by BECTU union members at the Ritzy Cinema in Brixton, London. Since 2016, there have been coordinated strike actions across five other Picturehouse cinemas, Hackney, Piccadilly Central, Crouch End, Brighton Duke of York's and East Dulwich.

== Background ==
Workers at the Ritzy Cinema first went on strike in 2007, as they were only receiving the then minimum wage of £5.35, with workers recognising the then poverty line as being £6.25. Staff later accepted a staggered pay increase of more than 22%.

In February 2014, Ritzy reps met with Picturehouse at ACAS and were offered a deal that fell short of the then London Living Wage, as set by the Living Wage Foundation each year. Following this in March 2014 workers balloted for industrial action. One action in June involved workers travelling to Hackney Picturehouse to demonstrate the perceived irony of the chain hosting of the Amnesty International Football and Human Rights Watch Film Festival. The protest gathered a lot of attention when Eric Cantona joined the workers' protest to show solidarity. The Human Rights Watch festival later issued a statement in support of the strikes.

In August Picturehouse proposed a new pay rate of £8 (raised from £7.53) with a promise it would rise to £9.10 by 2016. In a following ballot which closed in September, members voted to accept more detailed pay increases, with the highest paid members paid £8.80 still just short of the Living Wage. Claiming some victory the Ritzy reps produced a statement saying "A small milestone has been gained with our new pay offer from Picturehouse; winning what equates to a 26% pay rise over 3 years is a real achievement. Although strike action will now cease, our campaign for a Living Wage and the dignity and justice that it represents will continue."

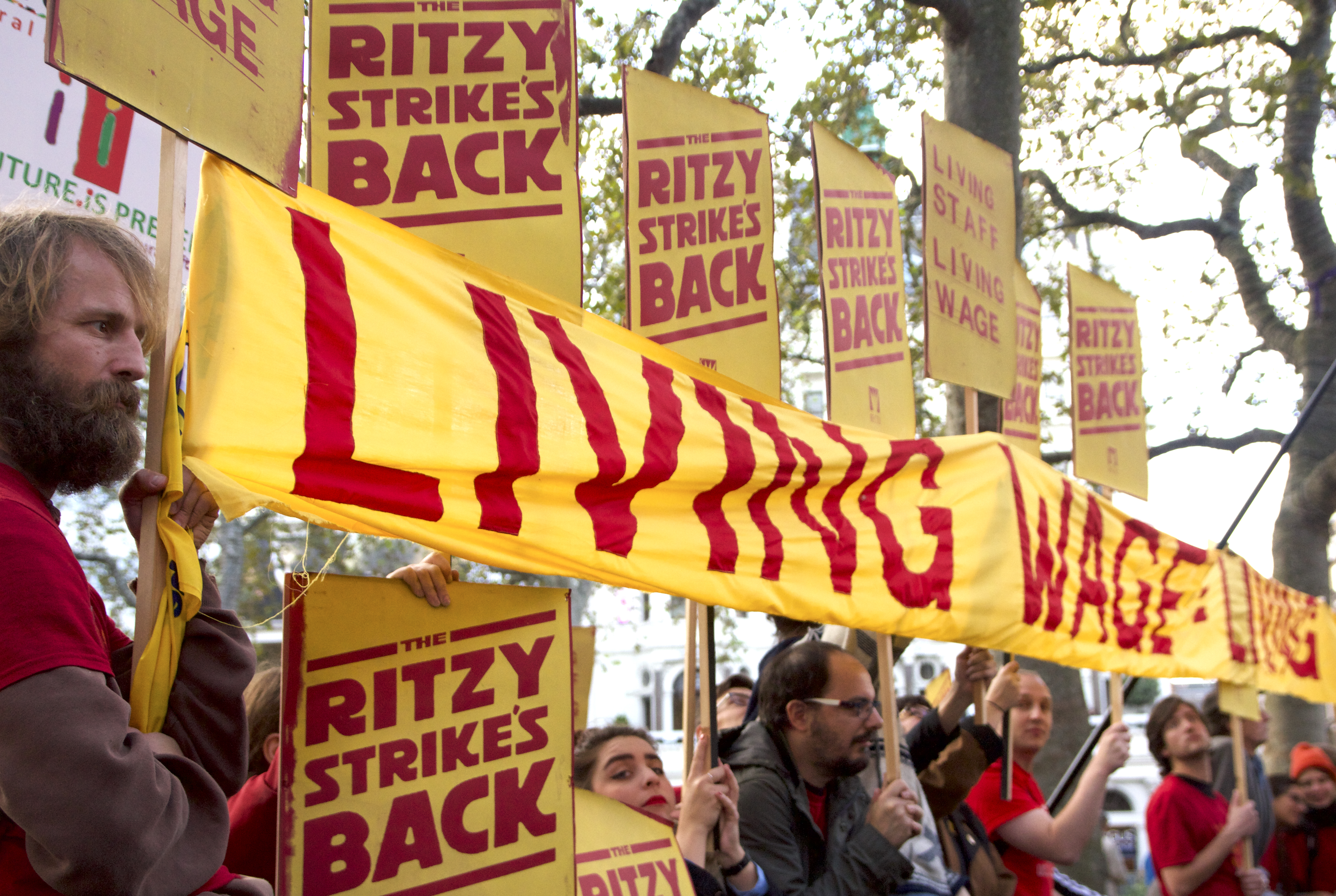
A staff picket at the Ritzy Cinema, 2016

Soon after agreement was reached, Picturehouse announced plans that as many as a third of jobs might be cut at the Ritzy, claiming this was due to higher costs. The announcement provoked calls for a boycott and accusations that this was a retaliation against organised staff. Two days later Curzon Cinemas announced that a deal had been agreed with BECTU to pay the Living Wage across the Curzon chain, prompting further questions as to why the cuts at the Ritzy were necessary. The following day Cineworld, the owners of the Picturehouse chain, announced the cuts would not go ahead, stating that the plans had been an error due to 'mixed up' management communications.

In March 2015 members won the TUC Youth Campaign Award for their work on 2015's campaign. A substantial pay increase was also passed on to staff at all other Picturehouse sites through a pay offer from management to the company union, the Picturehouse Staff Forum.

In September 2016 negotiations reopened between Ritzy BECTU members and Picturehouses, the members reignited their main purpose of instating the Living Wage at their workplace, the London Living Wage being £9.40 with the staff wages still falling short at £8.80 an hour. In addition the campaign asks for company sick pay for all staff, company maternity, paternity and adoption pay and fair pay rises for supervisors, managers, chefs, sound technicians, and projectionists. The first walk out of the current dispute was 24 September 2016 where workers dressed up as Star Wars stormtroopers holding signs with the slogan "The Ritzy Strikes Back!" A statement from staff reps read "We reject the notion that Cineworld Cinemas can get away with the economic irresponsibility it displays towards its workers at Picturehouses and Cineworld any longer, A company with £83.8 million in post-tax profit from 2015 can afford to meet our needs. We are forced into taking strike action by the unwillingness of the company to negotiate on our 2016 BECTU claim at ACAS."

From October 2016 onwards, industrial action spread to five further Picturehouse cinemas, Hackney, Piccadilly Central, Crouch End, Brighton Duke of York's and East Dulwich

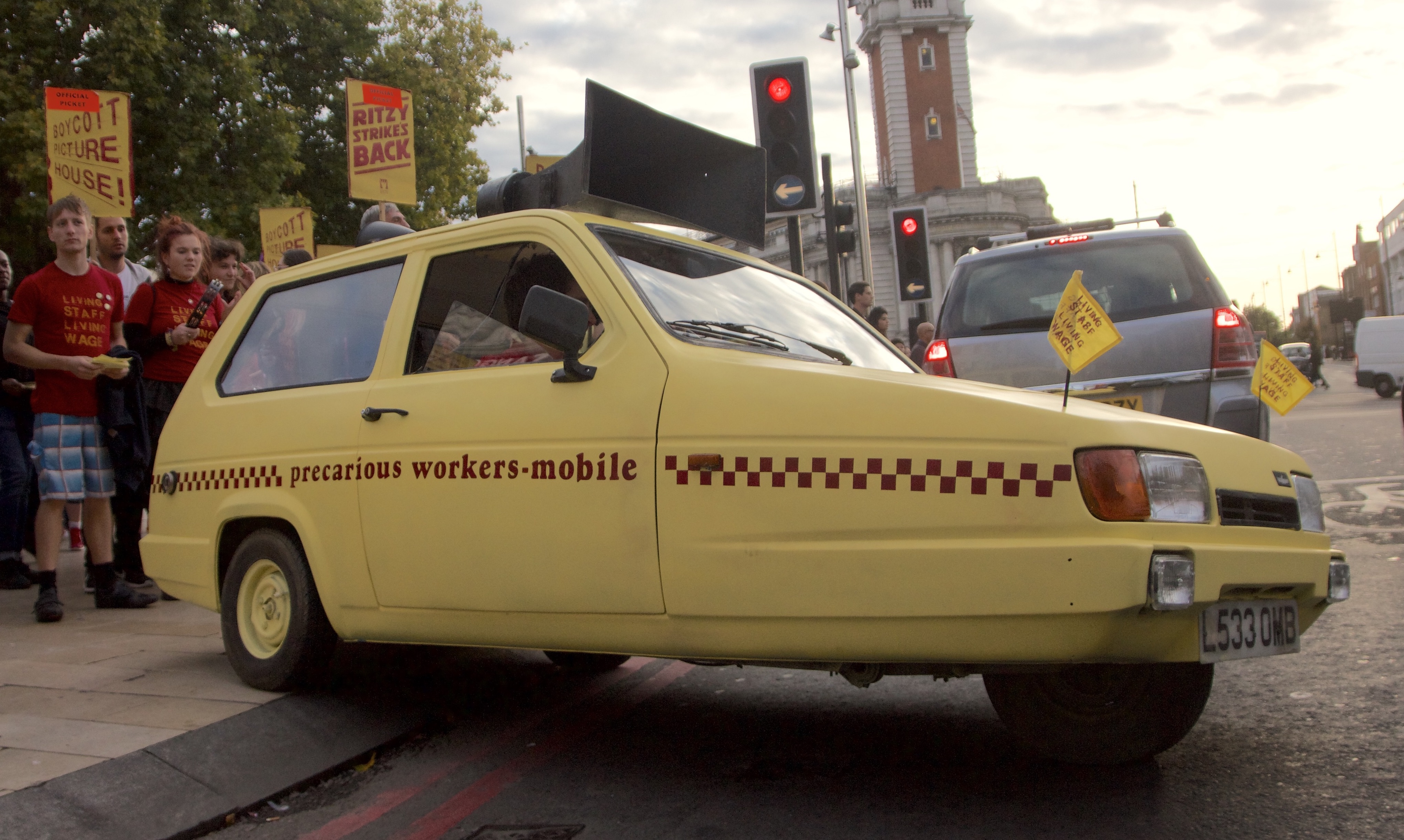
Striking staff outside the Ritzy Cinema with the Precarious Workers Mobile, a customised car used in the campaign

In July 2017 three Ritzy reps were sacked by Picturehouses on the accusation that they knew of community direct action tactics. At July demonstrations, journalist Owen Jones and MP John McDonnell attended a protest asking Picturehouses to reinstate the sacked reps, Jones declared "The Ritzy workers will win!". Two sacked staff representatives whose cases were heard at employment tribunal were unanimously found to be unfairly dismissed, citing a 'lack of neutrality at the investigation and disciplinary stages'. Following this it was also ruled that these reps must be returned to their former positions at the cinema. A separate tribunal for the third rep ruled that they had also been unfairly dismissed, with Picturehouse breaching their trade union rights and their right to Freedom of Assembly.

In August 2017 staff at multiple sites voted in favour of further strike action. Strikes continued into 2018 with Picturehouses refusing requests from striking staff to enter talks to resolve the dispute, as well as recruiting a pool of casual staff to keep cinemas open during strike action. Numerous threats through the company's lawyers, Mishcon De Reya, have been made against the union and staff, challenging the legality of the strikes and requests for the Living Wage, including threats to dismiss all striking staff. Accusations have been made that striking cinemas were allowed to become chronically understaffed, placing strain on the remaining staff members.

In November 2017 Curzon Cinemas were awarded the contract to develop the Ladywell Playtower in Lewisham. A successful campaign by protestors had put pressure on the council not to award the development to Picturehouse over the issue of working conditions and a refusal to pay the Living Wage.

In January 2018, planned partial strike action at certain times across 13 days was met by notification from Picturehouse that they would close the Ritzy Cinema entirely for the period, resulting in a considerable impact on staff pay. The strike action was eventually cancelled when staff at other striking cinemas were issued notice by the company that walking out for part of a shift could now result in loss of the entire shift's pay (while staff failing to attend those unpaid hours between strikes could also potentially be subject to disciplinary action). However, following an appeal to supporters for donations, over £10,000 was raised toward the strike fund within a few days, allowing staff to proceed in February with 7 full days of strike action.

In May 2018 staff picketed during the Sundance London Festival, hosted by Picturehouse Central, stating that "We call on Sundance as well as others including the BFI London film festival to encourage Picturehouse to resolve this dispute, or withdraw from their partnerships moving forward. This industrial dispute is widely recognised within the industry, and workers will continue to use their human right to withdraw labour until the industry itself treats financial inequality in the same vain as all other abuses.”

== Union recognition ==
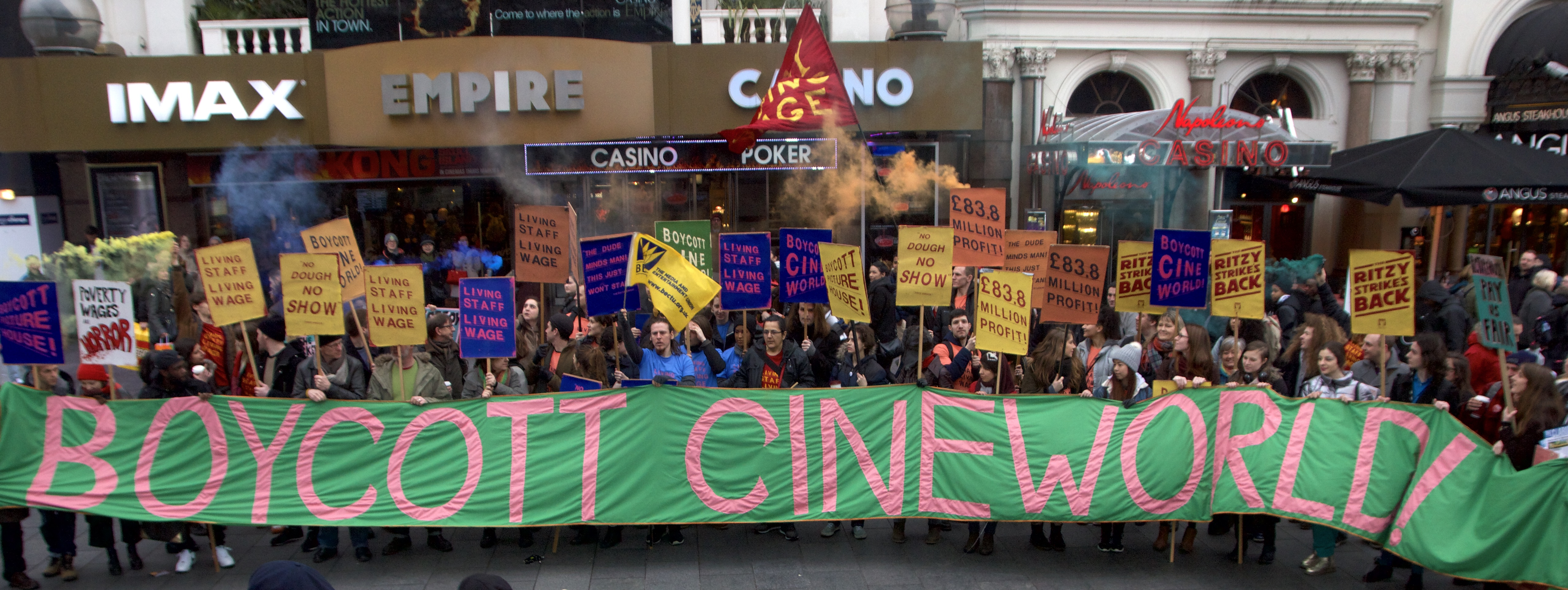
Striking Picturehouse staff demonstrating in Leicester Square, London, 2017

In addition to the strike demands of Ritzy staff, BECTU members at other striking cinemas have been campaigning for recognition of the independent BECTU union and derecognition of the Picturehouse Staff Forum, a company union. The Forum was founded by senior Picturehouse management in response to a request from BECTU to continue an existing agreement when the chain bought the Ritzy Cinema in 2003; after a court case, BECTU was recognised and negotiations began in 2004. The voluntary recognition agreement with the Staff Forum, signed by management without staff consultation, still covers employees at all Picturehouse cinemas except the Ritzy and prevents the recognition of another union unless derecognised.

In 2014 a legal challenge was brought by BECTU to the Central Arbitration Committee arguing that The Forum was not a genuine union. The challenge was rejected, however the decision of the committee has been criticised as not respecting the spirit of laws governing trade union representation, while the committee itself described the Forum as 'highly atypical as an organisation, let alone an organisation of workers'.

In 2019, following a membership vote, the Picturehouse Staff Forum was dissolved. It was later removed by the Certification Officer from the official list of trade unions.

== Support for the campaign ==
In a Guardian video interview between Owen Jones and Russell Brand, Jones wore the Living Staff Living Wage campaign t-shirt and the pair discussed the strikes. Brand declared "First the Ritzy, then the world!"

John McDonnell MP has joined striking workers demonstrating at the Ritzy saying "The whole labour movement will stand shoulder to shoulder with victimised workers at the Ritzy cinema and across the Picturehouse chain." Mayor of London Sadiq Khan and Labour Party Leader Jeremy Corbyn have also voiced their support for the campaign. In July 2017 MP Helen Hayes raised the issue of the dispute with Theresa May at Prime Minister's Questions.

Film stars and celebrities such as Sir Patrick Stewart, Susan Sarandon Richard Curtis, Lindsay Duncan, Sir Mark Rylance Ken Loach, Mike Leigh and Eric Cantona have lent their support. Following a staff protest during the 2017 BFI London Film Festival, high-profile UK industry figures signed an open letter calling for cinema chain Picturehouse, and owner Cineworld, to end the dispute.

== Current situation ==
In 2019 BECTU called off the company boycott stating "BECTU members have now agreed to suspend our Living Staff Living Wage campaign and call off the public boycott to focus on fighting for equal pay at the Ritzy and continuing to challenge the dismissal of other members. We won’t rest until Ritzy and Picturehouse follows suit with other cinema employers we have successfully worked with and treats all its workers fairly."

As of the 2024 renegotiations Picturehouse cinemas still do not pay their frontline staff the living wage as set out each year by the Real Living Wage foundation.
