= Roger Maunder =

Roger Maunder may refer to:

- Roger Maunder (filmmaker)
- Roger Maunder (fencer)
