= Tiscali (disambiguation) =

Tiscali may refer to:

- Tiscali, an Italian telecommunications company
  - Tiscali Campus, headquarters of the company, based in Sa Illetta, Cagliari
  - Tiscali International Network, an international telecommunications company
  - Tiscali Italia, an Italian telecommunications company
  - Tiscali Mobile, an Italian mobile telecommunications company
  - Tiscali UK, a British telecommunications company
  - Tiscali Short Film Award, sponsored by the company
- Tiscali (village), an archaeological site in Sardinia, Italy

== See also ==
- Tiscali TV
