= Tiscali TV =

Tiscali TV may refer to:

- Tiscali TV (Italy) - Italian IPTV service by Tiscali Italia
- Tiscali TV (UK) - British IPTV service by Tiscali UK

== See also ==
- Tiscali (disambiguation)
