= Tiscali Short Film Award =

The Tiscali Short Film Award is a major short film award, sponsored by Tiscali and presented at the Raindance Film Festival each year since 2005 to the "best UK short under 10 minutes by a debut filmmaker".

Films which have won, or been nominated for, the award have gone on to achieve other notable successes, including a BAFTA Award, two BAFTA Award nominations, a Golden Palm nomination at the Cannes Film Festival, an Audience Award at the Kraków Film Festival, a Merit Award at the Arizona International Film Festival, a Best Newcomer Award at the Rushes Soho Shorts Festival, a BBC Three New Filmmakers Award nomination and a Best Short Film nomination at the Rushes Soho Shorts Festival.

== 2007 ==
Rank	Film	Director(s)	Producer(s)	Writer(s)	Production Company
Winner	Amelia and Michael	Daniel Cormack	Daniel Cormack, Matt Gunner	Stephen Betts	Actaeon Films Ltd
Nominated	Badmouth	Shanti Ramakuri	Shanti Ramakuri	Shona Pollock, Shanti Ramakuri	N/A
Nominated	Blood on his Hands	Justin Coleman		Justin Coleman	N/A
Nominated	The Collectors	Tim Elliot	Miles Wilkes, Tim Elliot	Tim Elliot	N/A
Nominated	Isabel	Katrina Mansfield	Katrina Mansfield	Katrina Mansfield	N/A

== 2006 ==
Rank	Film	Director(s)	Producer(s)	Writer(s)	Production Company
Winner	Goodbye Mr Snuggles	Jonathon Hopkins	Jonathon Hopkins, Rory Aitken	Jonathon Hopkins	Between the Eyes
Nominated	Fetch	Dana Dorian	Sam McCarthy	Dana Dorian	N/A
Nominated	Film Noir	Osbert Parker	Osbert Parker, Fiona Pitkin	Osbert Parker	N/A
Nominated	Life Goes On	Trevor Hardy	Trevor Hardy, A Finbow	R Young, Trevor Hardy	N/A
Nominated	Ynomitset Ym	Tuyet Le	Tuyet Le	Tuyet Le	N/A

== 2005 ==
Rank	Film	Director(s)	Producer(s)	Writer(s)	Production Company
Winner	Cricker Crack	Rob Heppell	Rob Heppell	Jefferson Keery	N/A
Nominated	Conehead	Don Pan	Don Pan	Don Pan	N/A
Nominated	L'Amour Est	Adam Comiskey	Adam Comiskey	Adam Comiskey	N/A
Nominated	Park	Andrew Pearson	Simon Plant	Andrew Pearson	N/A
Nominated	Sock	Dave Waters	Kate O'Mulloy	S Riley	N/A
