= Duke of York's Picture House, Brighton =

Art house cinema in Brighton, England

Coordinates: 50°50′02″N 0°08′18″W

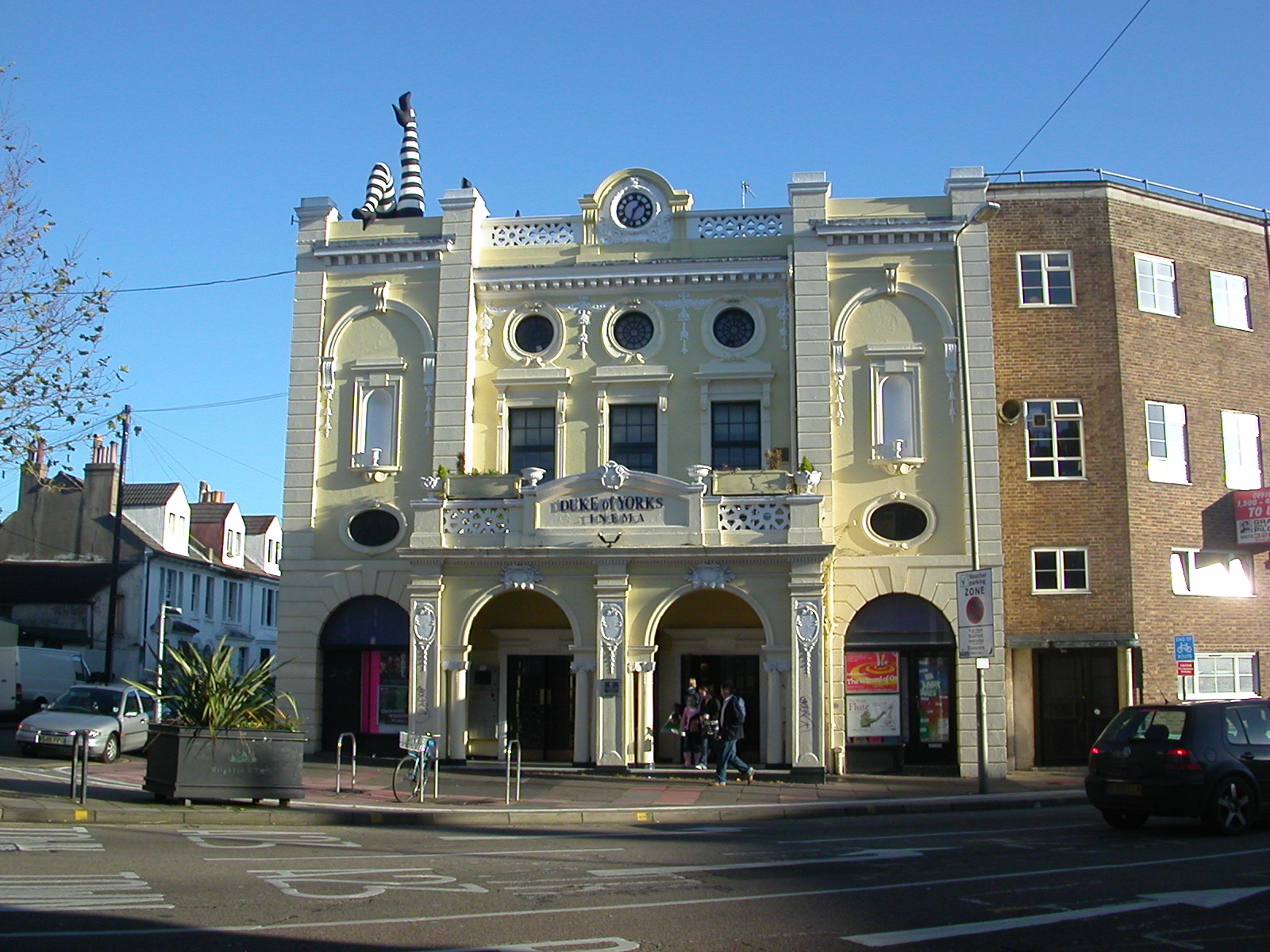
Exterior of the Duke of York's Picture House.

The Duke of York's Picture House is an art house cinema in Brighton, England, which lays claim to being the oldest cinema in continuous use in Britain. According to cinema historian Allen Eyles, the cinema "deserves to be named Britain's oldest cinema".

The cinema is a Grade II listed building.

== History ==
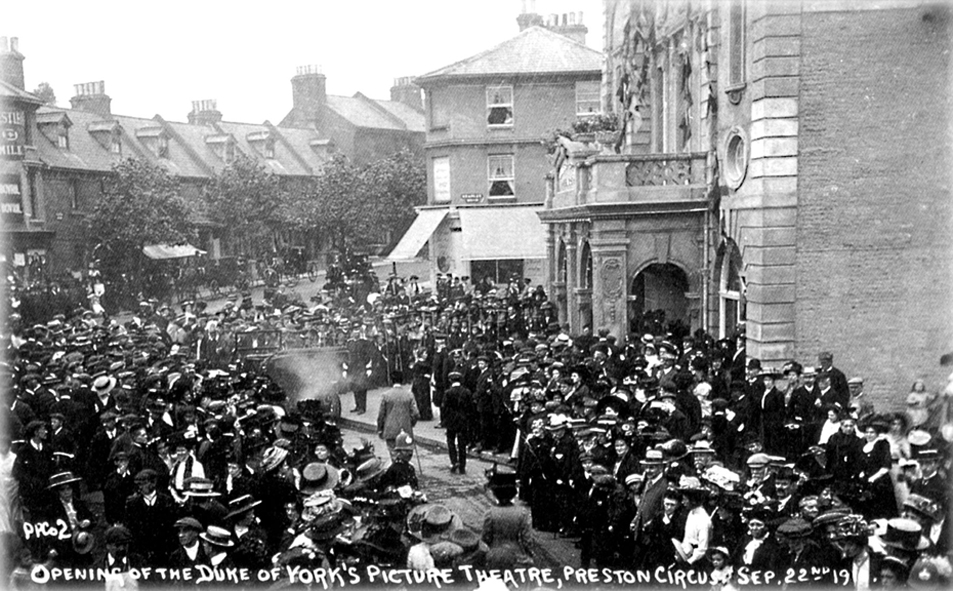
Opening day, 22 September 1910.

The Duke of York's cinema was built at the cost of £3000 by actress-manager Violet Melnotte-Wyatt. It opened on 22 September 1910 and was one of Brighton's first picture palaces and also one of the first cinemas in the world. It was built on the site of the Amber Ale Brewery, the walls of the brewery's malthouse still form the rear part of the auditorium. The architects were Clayton & Black. The building remains largely unaltered, it even retains one of its boxes in the balcony area. The original colour scheme was red and cream.

The Duke of York's was always a quality cinema for the more discerning patron, its marketing tag-line for many years was "Bring her to the Duke's, it is fit for a Duchess." The name came from the West End theatre which its first proprietor Mrs Melnotte-Wyatt was also associated with. Being slightly outside the town centre, the Duke's catered for its local audience and this has been its saving grace. While other cinemas in Brighton came and went, The Duke of York's has remained in continuous operation.

The cinema has operated as an arts cinema since 1981 and has passed through several owners and hosted illegal punk rock concerts. The cinema was in a shabby state when it was purchased in 1994 by Picturehouse Cinemas who have invested in the building and returned it to its former glory.

In December 2012, the cinema become part of the Cineworld chain, with general manager Jon Barrenechea promising it would remain an arthouse cinema. That same month, a sister venue called Dukes at Komedia was opened across town in the North Laine, above the Komedia comedy club.

In March 2015 a campaign was started with the goal of gaining official recognition of the trade union BECTU, the Broadcasting, Entertainment, Cinematograph and Theatre Union from Picturehouse. The campaign is ongoing in Brighton.

== Architecture ==
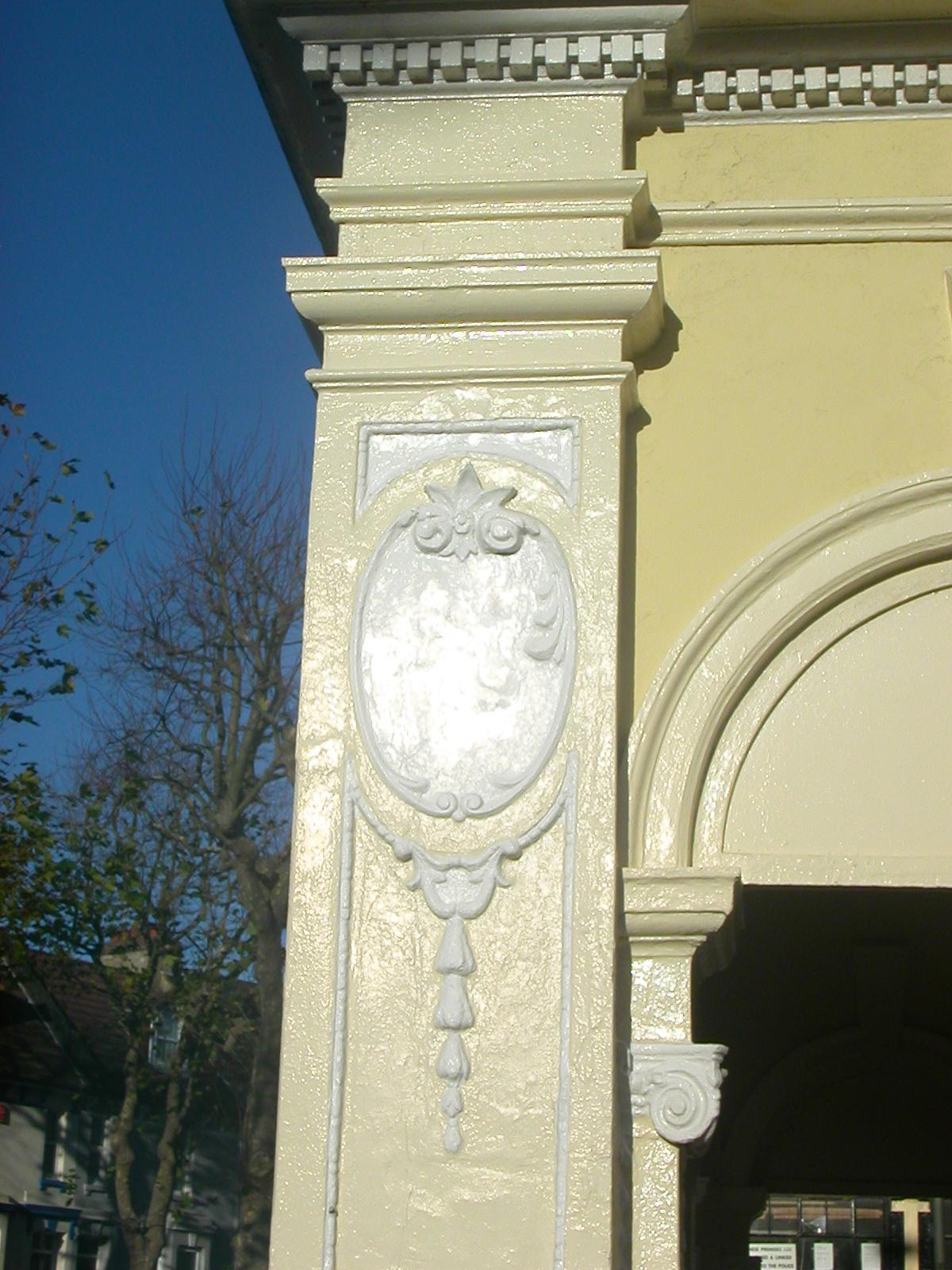
Detail on an exterior pillar.

The cinema has a single screen with 278 seats, including a luxury balcony. It originally seated over 800, but modifications have been made to the inside of the building to create the café/bar upstairs, a concession space downstairs, and to allow for greater comfort.

In 1991, a 20-foot (6.1 m) pair of can-can dancer's legs were acquired from the recently closed Not The Moulin Rouge Theatre in Oxford, and were installed onto the outside front balcony. These were later moved to their current position on the roof during a refurbishment in 1995.

In 2007, the cinema launched an appeal to replace its leaking roof. Over £25,000 was raised from public donations, benefit concerts, benefit screenings and 'sponsor-a-seat' programme. The roof was replaced in April 2008. The balcony was remodelled at the same time to include sofas and armchairs.

== Events ==
The Duke of York's plays host to the Cinecity Brighton Film Festival each year, organised between The Duke of York's and the University of Brighton.

The cinema hosts events such as fancy-dress film premieres, all night The Lord of the Rings marathons and late night cult screenings.

== See also ==
- Grade II listed buildings in Brighton and Hove: C–D
