= Picturehouse Cinemas =

Cinema chain in the United Kingdom

Picturehouse Cinemas Limited
- Industry: Leisure, Entertainment & Film Distribution
- Founded: 1989; 37 years ago
- Founder: Lyn Goleby/Tony Jones
- Headquarters: London, England
- Number of locations: 28
- Area served: United Kingdom
- Key people: Clare Binns (Managing Director)
- Parent: Cineworld
- Subsidiaries: Picturehouse Entertainment
- Website: picturehouses.com picturehouses.com/entertainment

Picturehouse Cinemas is a network of cinemas in the United Kingdom, owned by Cineworld. The company runs its own film distribution arm, Picturehouse Entertainment, which has released acclaimed films such as Hirokazu Kore-eda's Broker and Monster, Scrapper, Corsage, Sally Potter's The Party, Francis Lee's God's Own Country and The Wife. A previous iteration of this distribution arm, which focused largely on alternative content, was sold in 2017 to Howard Panter and Rosemary Squire and rebranded as Trafalgar Releasing.

The first cinema in the chain, Phoenix Picturehouse, opened in Oxford in 1989, but many of the others operated independently before then: the Duke of York's Picture House in Brighton, for example, opened in 1910 and is Britain's longest continually operating cinema.

On 17 March 2020, Picturehouse and all other movie cinema companies in the UK temporarily closed their UK cinemas, due to the COVID-19 pandemic, reopening them on 31 July. A second closure took place from 9 October 2020 until 17 May 2021, due to an insufficient number of new film releases and a second wave of the pandemic closing indoor venues.

In 2022, their parent company Cineworld filed for Chapter 11 bankruptcy in the United States, On 31 July 2023, Cineworld entered administration in the UK. That same day, Cineworld emerged from Chapter 11 bankruptcy after slashing billions of dollars in debt and the much-needed boost from the Barbenheimer box office success.

== Locations ==
=== Current ===
| Image | Location | Name | Screens | Notes |
|---|---|---|---|---|
| | Bath | Little Theatre Cinema | 2 | |
| | Brighton | Duke of York's | 1 | Grade II-listed, it opened 22 September 1910 and is Britain's oldest purpose-built cinema. It has a 20-foot sculpture of a can-can dancer's legs on its roof. |
| | Brighton | Duke's at Komedia | 2 | |
| | Cambridge | Arts Picturehouse | 3 | The Regal Cinema opened in the city's Regent Street in 1937, was redeveloped in 1972 as a two-screen ABC cinema, and closed in 1997. Two years later, Wetherspoons installed a pub on the ground level of the building, with the Arts Picturehouse establishing a three-screen cinema above it. The cinema hosts the annual Cambridge Film Festival. |
| | Chester | Chester Picturehouse | 6 | Opened on Friday 10 November 2023 |
| | Edinburgh | Cameo | 3 | It originally opened in 1914 as the King's Cinema, acquired sound in 1930, was renamed The Cameo in 1949, and was granted B-listed heritage status in 2006. |
| | Epsom | Epsom Picturehouse | 6 | Opened on Saturday 1 June 2024 |
| | Exeter | Exeter Picturehouse | 2 | It was designed by Burrell Foley Fischer, opened in 1996 and has a first floor cafe. |
| | Henley-on-Thames | Regal | 3 | |
| | Liverpool | Picturehouse at FACT | 3 | Has a bar which hosts events. |
| ] | London – Brixton | Ritzy | 5 | |
| | London – Clapham | Clapham Picturehouse | 4 | |
| ] | London – Crouch End | Crouch End Picturehouse | 5 | Has a restaurant and bar. Its building, Rosebery House, was erected in the 1950s as a factory and office, and refurbished in 2015 by Panter Hudspith. |
| | London – Ealing | Ealing Picturehouse | 8 | Opened October 2023. |
| | London – East Dulwich | East Dulwich Picturehouse and Café | 3 | |
| | London - Finsbury Park | Finsbury Park Picturehouse | 7 | Opened September 2021. |
| | London – Greenwich | Greenwich Picturehouse | 5 | |
| | London – Hackney Central | Hackney Picturehouse | 6 | |
| | London – Notting Hill | The Gate Cinema | 1 | |
| | London – Piccadilly | Picturehouse Central | 7 | Host venue for Sundance London Film Festival. It has a membership scheme which gives access to a rooftop member's bar. |
| | London – West Norwood | West Norwood Picturehouse | 4 | The original Nettlefold Hall was reimagined as a Library and opened by Princess Margaret in 1969. In 1970 Stanley Kubrick filmed a scene for A Clockwork Orange in the old hall. It was refurbished and opened as a Picturehouse Cinema in 2018. |
| | Norwich | Cinema City | 3 | |
| | Oxford | Phoenix | 2 | Originally opened as the North Oxford Kinema in 1913, became the Phoenix Cinema in 1989 |
| | Southampton | Harbour Lights | 2 | Designed by Burrell Foley Fischer, Harbour Lights opened in February 1995. The building received a Civic Trust Commendation, was shortlisted for a RIBA award for architecture, and was shortlisted for the Sunday Times building of the year. The cinema was voted Britain's Best-Loved Independent Cinema Empire readers in 2000. |
| | York | City Screen | 3 | |

=== Former ===
| Image | Location | Name | Screens | Notes |
|---|---|---|---|---|
| | Ashford | Ashford Picturehouse | 6 | Lease ended in April 2024 and now run by the council as "The Ashford Cinema" |
| | Aberdeen | The Belmont Picturehouse | 3 | Sold in 2014 to the Centre for the Moving Image |
| | Bury St Edmunds | The Abbeygate Picturehouse | 2 | Sold June 2014 to Abbeygate Cinemas |
| | London – Bromley | Bromley Picturehouse | 6 | House in a 1936 art deco building by George Coles, the venue became a Picturehouse cinema in June 2019. It had a bar and kitchen. Closed August 1, 2024 |
| | London – Chelsea | Fulham Road Picturehouse | 6 | Formerly a Cineworld cinema, the venue opened as a Picturehouse on 8 December 2019. Closed July 11, 2024 |
| | London – Stratford | Stratford Picturehouse | 4 | Host venue for the Sci-Fi London Film Festival and the Fighting Spirit Film Festival. Closed July 28, 2024 |
| | Stratford Upon Avon | Stratford Upon Avon Picturehouse | 2 | Closed down on 5 January 2020 |

== Industrial action ==
In 2014, Cineworld was subject to industrial action owing to its refusal to pay the London living wage to its staff. Started by workers at the Ritzy Cinema, Brixton, the resulting Ritzy Living Wage campaign attracted the support of Eric Cantona and Terry Jones.

Industrial action resumed in October 2016 over the issue of the Living Wage, as well as recognition of the theatre union BECTU, parental pay and sick pay, and spread to six Picturehouse cinemas, making it the biggest strike action ever by cinema workers in the UK. Staff at the Ritzy Cinema were represented by BECTU while other cinemas were represented by the Picturehouse Staff Forum, a company union set up by management in 2003 and later run by Picturehouse staff.

Strikes continued into 2018, when workplace reps were found to be unfairly dismissed and were instructed to be reinstated, meanwhile Picturehouse claimed that they were one of the highest paying employers in the UK cinema industry.

In 2019, following a membership vote, the Staff Forum (run by Picturehouse management) was dissolved and later removed by the Certification Officer from the official list of trade unions. BECTU also called off the company boycott, stating "BECTU members have now agreed to suspend our Living Staff Living Wage campaign and call off the public boycott to focus on fighting for equal pay at the Ritzy and continuing to challenge the dismissal of other members. We won't rest until Ritzy and Picturehouse follows suit with other cinema employers we have successfully worked with and treats all its workers fairly." As of 2026, Picturehouse cinemas still do not pay their frontline staff a living wage.
