= Jess Search =

British documentary producer

- Born: 15 May 1969; 57 years ago Hampshire
- Died: 31 July 2023 (aged 54)
- Education: University of Oxford
- Occupation: Film producer
- Known for: Shooting People; Doc Society
- Spouse: Beadie Finzi (married 2018)

Jess Search was a British documentary film producer who co-founded Doc Society, a non-profit organisation for the production of independent documentary films, and Shooting People, an international social network for independent filmmakers.

== Early life ==
Search was born in Waterlooville, Hampshire and was raised in Sevenoaks, Kent to Henrietta (née Loufte) and Phil Search. Her father died in a car accident when she was 18.

She was educated at Tonbridge Grammar School and Sevenoaks School before studying philosophy, politics and economics at New College, Oxford. After university she had a gap year in Sydney.

== Career ==
Search began her career in 1992 working as an assistant for her uncle, Tony Laryea, at his company Catalyst Television.

In 1998, she co-founded Shooting People, an international social network for independent filmmakers, with Cath Le Couteur. She then joined Channel 4 in 1999 as a commissioning editor in the Independent Film and Video Department. She stayed in this role until 2004 when the department was shut down.

In 2005, she co-founded Britdoc (renamed Doc Society in 2017) with Maxyne Franklin, Katie Bradford, and Beadie Finzi. She announced in an open letter in July 2023 that she would be stepping back from Doc Society after having received a cancer diagnosis.

Additionally, she acted as a trustee of MSI Reproductive Choices and served on the boards of the Institute for Public Policy Research and Kickstarter.

== Personal life ==
Search described herself as queer and gender nonconforming. She used the pronouns "she" and "her".

In 2018, Search married fellow film producer Beadie Finzi in Margate. They raised two children together, Ella and Ben. In her spare time she enjoyed walking her lurchers, reading poetry, and gaming.

Search was diagnosed with brain cancer in June 2023. She died on 31 July 2023 at the age of 54.
