= Voor een paar knikkers meer =

- Directed by: Jelmar Hufen
- Screenplay by: Jelmar Hufen
- Produced by: Erik Schut; Christoph Koelemeijer
- Starring: Ruben van den Besselaar; Tom Schild; Aidan Vernée; Pauline Winckel; Merijn van Heiningen
- Cinematography: Aage Hollander
- Edited by: Marco Mocking; Jelmar Hufen
- Music by: Maarten Spruijt
- Production company: Kairos Films
- Release date: 23 September 2006
- Country: Netherlands
- Language: Dutch

For a few marbles more (Dutch: Voor een paar knikkers meer) is a 2006 short Dutch film written and directed by Jelmar Hufen. The film was selected for over 240 film festivals in 57 countries and received 41 awards. 'For a few marbles more' is the most selected and awarded Dutch (short) film ever.

== Plot ==
Four ten–year-olds are kicked out of their favorite playground by two aggressive drunkards. When they realize their parents are not going to help them, there's only one solution. They have to find a way to get the toughest boy in the neighborhood to help them. From that moment on the four friends are in for an exciting adventure.

== Cast ==
- Ruben van den Besselaar as Jasper
- Merijn van Heiningen as Boy in black
- Tom Schild as Michiel
- Aidan Vernee as Boy in yellow
- Pauline Winckel as Sofie
- Rob Prenger as Thin man
- Edo Brunner as Fat man
- Marlies Maas Geesteranus as Mother of Michiel
- Jan van Rossum as Father of Michiel
- Gabriëlle Hengeveld - Moeder of Sofie
- Jack Wouterse as Father of Sofie (Voice)
- Bracha van Doesburgh - Mother of Sofie (Voice)
- Victor Löw - Father of Michiel (Voice)
- Halina Reijn - Mother of Michiel (Voice)

== Awards ==
- Winner ‘Best Director’ - The YoungCuts Film Festival, Canada
- Winner ‘DokuKids Award’ - Dokufest International Documentary and Short Film Festival, Kosovo
- 2nd place ‘Best Short Drama’ – The End of the Pier International Film Festival, UK
- 2nd place ‘Best Short European Film’ – The End of the Pier International Film Festival, UK
- Special Mention - SCHLINGEL International Film Festival, Germany
