= Wreckers (film) =

- Film poster
- Directed by: D. R. Hood
- Written by: D. R. Hood
- Produced by: Simon Onwurah
- Starring: Benedict Cumberbatch; Claire Foy; Shaun Evans
- Cinematography: Annemarie Lean-Vercoe
- Edited by: Claire Pringle
- Music by: Andrew Lovett
- Production company: Likely Story
- Release date: 16 December 2011
- Running time: 81 minutes
- Country: United Kingdom
- Language: English

Wreckers is a 2011 British drama film written and directed by D. R. Hood and starring Claire Foy, Benedict Cumberbatch, Shaun Evans, Peter McDonald, and Sinead Matthews.

== Plot ==
A married couple, David and Dawn, move back to David's childhood village and work on rebuilding a house. They are trying for a child and arrange to see a doctor. David's younger brother, Nick, who has not been in touch for several years, comes back from the army and pays them a visit. Slowly, events in their messy childhoods are revealed.

David and Nick, with Dawn, meet their childhood neighbours Gary and Sharon who are now married. They recall their childhood memories and Dawn learns some unexpected things about David and Nick. She also learns from an old teacher of theirs that their father used to beat them. Day by day, Nick shows himself as a troubled man, especially due to his experiences during the war. Dawn reaches out to comfort him but it spites David who is tired of taking care of him and says that he can't be helped. David grows more and more jealous of the attachment between Nick and Dawn. Nick's mental illness gets worse and finally he decides to leave them and go back to the army.

Dawn meets Gary in the church where they attend a choir and he shows interest in her. They have a picnic where Dawn secretly sees Nick and Sharon having sex in the garden. While returning from a function in the church, Gary tries to kiss Dawn but she refuses. When David and Dawn consult with a doctor, David admits that he's unable to father a child. This leaves Dawn shocked and upset and they have a fight. David is horrified to think that Dawn might leave him.

Gary visits Dawn at their home the next morning. Dawn tries to avoid him by pretending she's not home but eventually they end up having sex. Later, feeling horribly guilty, David apologizes to Dawn who feels heavy with guilt herself. They end up reconciling.

They meet their friends for a barbecue before Nick leaves where David, Nick and Gary get into a fight, again revealing more of their childhood troubles. Some time after Nick has left, David receives a call which says that Nick has gone AWOL. Dawn goes looking for him at their childhood house and finds him there, much troubled. He tells her that David used to look after him as their father was abusive but that David kind of owned him. He claims that David loves him but Dawn says that's not love and that David hates him. She tells him to leave them alone if he truly loves his brother.

Later that night, Dawn goes back to the old house to give Nick some money but finds the place empty. She returns home and faints due to her pregnancy. She wakes up in a hospital, finding David beside her bed. He is filled with remorse about how he's treated her and the fact that he's kept secrets. He tells her to keep the baby, knowing that he cannot give her what she wants, probably assuming the baby is his brother's child.

Later the couple is seen as a happy family with a baby boy. David is raising him with Dawn as his own. In the final scene, they run into Gary and Sharon in a park. Whilst Gary is holding the boy, David suddenly realises that Gary is actually the father. But after they leave, David keeps walking, saying nothing, only holding the baby closer.

== Cast ==
- Claire Foy as Dawn
- Benedict Cumberbatch as David
- Shaun Evans as Nick
- Peter McDonald as Gary
- Sinead Matthews as Sharon
