= Gate Cinema =

Grade II listed building in Notting Hill Gate, London

Coordinates: 51.508686°N 0.197332°W

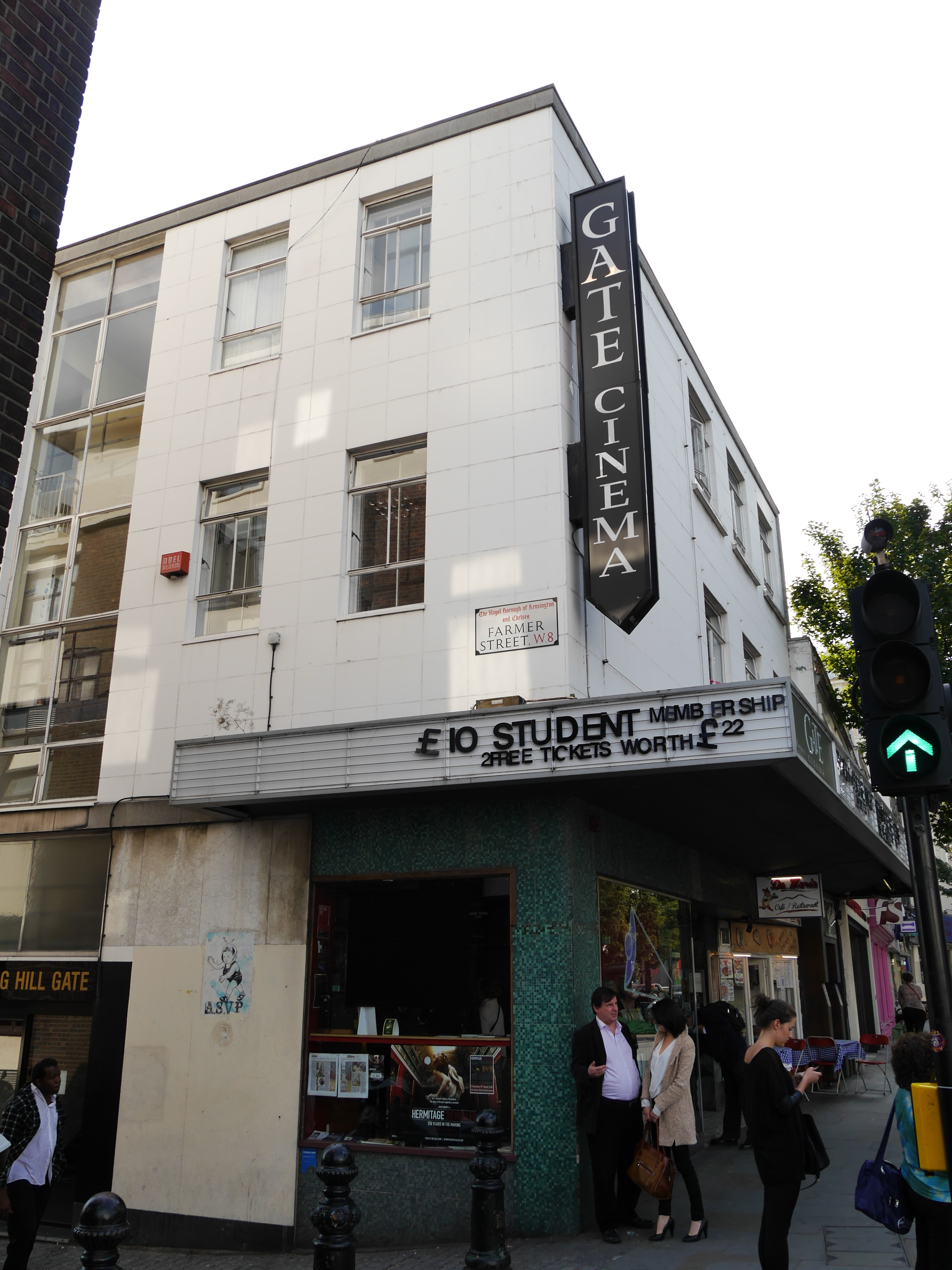
Gate Cinema, Notting Hill Gate, 2014

The Gate Cinema is a Grade II listed cinema in Notting Hill Gate, London W11. Since 2003 it has been operated by Picturehouse Cinemas.

It opened in April 1911 as the Electric Palace with capacity for 480, having been converted by William Hancock from an 1861 restaurant. The cinema was taken over by Capitol & Provincial News Theatres who later renamed it The Embassy. Capitol & Provincial News Theatres became Classic Cinemas and the cinema was renamed Classic Cinema in 1957. The building was damaged during the Blitz and the replacement exterior was much plainer. In 1962 the foyer was rebuilt by Douton and Hurst.

The cinema was renamed The Gate in 1974 following the demise of Classic Cinemas and was operated by Cinegate. It closed in 1985. In 1986, it was acquired by the newly formed Oasis Cinemas Group, a division of the Island Group owned by PolyGram, and reopened. Oasis later purchased The Cameo, Edinburgh and, in 1991, the Ritzy Cinema in Brixton.

The Gate Cinema was Grade II listed by English Heritage in 2000 as part of a wave of cinema building listings, largely for the mostly unaltered auditorium and its "exceptionally lavish Edwardian baroque plaster decoration". After being take over by Picturehouse Cinemas in 2003, it was refurbished in 2004 and again in 2024.
