= Death knock =

Practice in journalism

In journalism, the term death knock refers to the practice of journalists contacting people with a close relationship to a deceased individual, in an attempt to garner their thoughts and feelings regarding the death, and also gather other information.

The practice of death knocks, is often considered to be a negative aspect of journalism, but the exposure it brings has also been shown to sometimes be a comfort to bereaved individuals.

In the United Kingdom, the Independent Press Standards Organisation has laid down guidelines relating to how death knocks are carried out. These guidelines include using sensitivity, sympathy, and discretion when practicing death knocks.

== Digital use ==
Due to the increasing popularity of social media, many journalists now take advantage of the internet when practicing death knocks. Journalists will often use social media platforms to find photographs and comments that were posted by the deceased individual or their loved ones.

Using the internet for death knocks is not only convenient, but also far less stressful for journalists. Since many journalists view death knocks as a negative aspect of their job, it is often associated with anxiety, low-self esteem, and even self-disgust. Journalists are also often criticized for using social media for death knocks because it is a controversial practice that many people find to be unethical. Although journalists consider social media to be in the public domain, others consider it an invasion of privacy of the deceased and their loved ones. Not only is social media often criticized for its inaccuracy, but its use by journalists may be harmful to the deceased individual's family. When journalists use information from social media, families lose control over the media's portrayal of the deceased individual. Many families expect to be contacted by journalists after their loved one's death and will often feel betrayed once they discover that information was used from their social media without their consent. However, many journalists recognize the importance of traditional death knocks and will typically only use social media as a "last resort."
