= Ritzy Cinema =

Cinema in Brixton, London, England

Ritzy Picturehouse
- The Ritzy
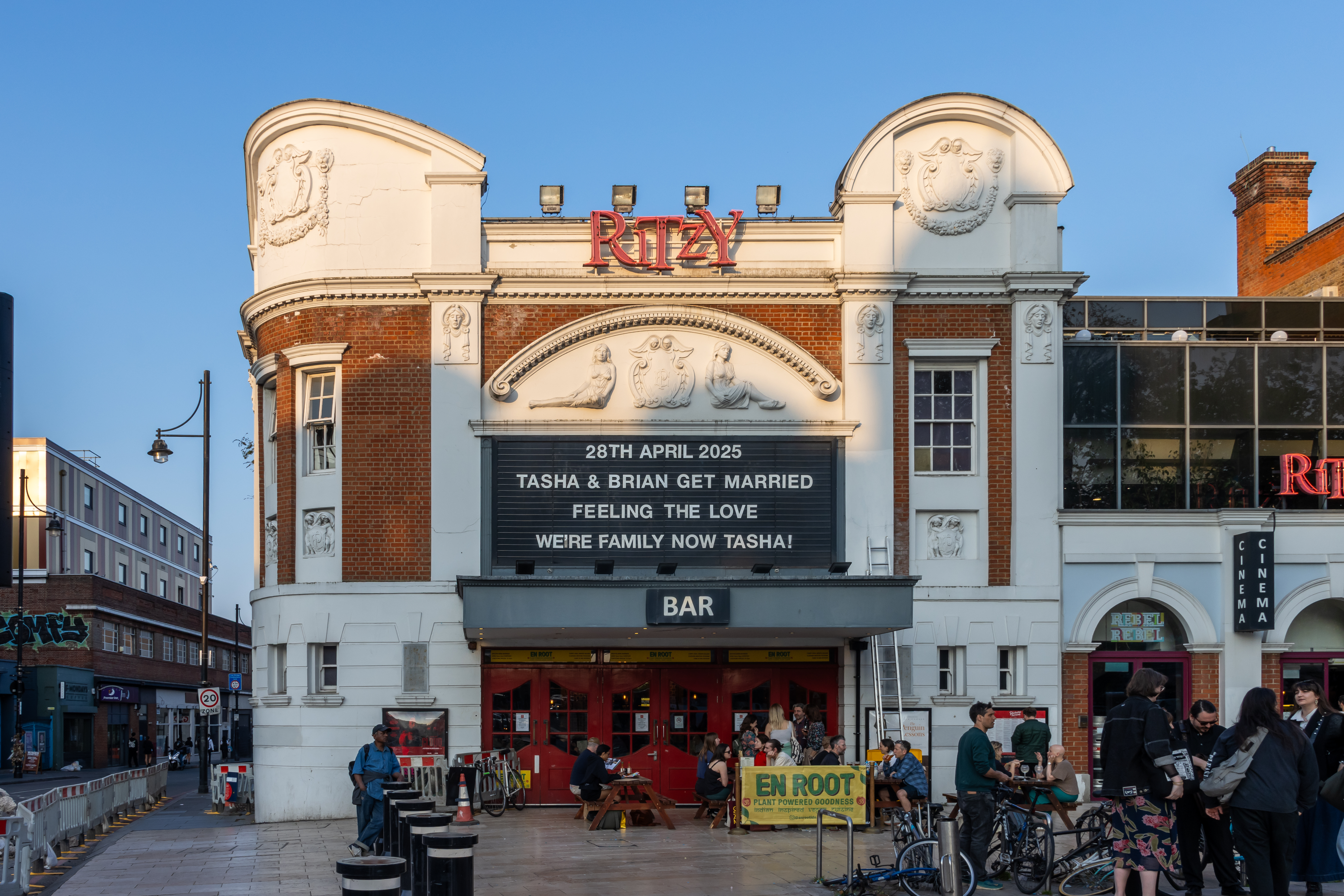
- Interactive map of Ritzy Picturehouse
- Former names: The Electric Pavilion, The Pullman Cinema
- Address: Brixton Oval, Coldharbour Lane, Brixton, London SW2 1JG
- Coordinates: 51.4613°N 0.1148°W
- Owner: Cineworld
- Operator: Picturehouse Cinemas

Construction
- Opened: 1911
- Architects: E. C. Homer and Lucas
- Builder: Israel Davis

Website
- picturehouses.com/cinema/Ritzy_Picturehouse

The Ritzy is a cinema in Brixton, London, England. It is a Grade II listed building. It is managed by Picturehouse Cinemas, who were bought by Cineworld in 2012.

The cinema opened on 11 March 1911 as "the Electric Pavilion". It was built by E.C. Homer and Lucas for Israel Davis, one of a noted family of cinema developers, and was one of England's earliest purpose-built cinemas, seating over 750 seats in the single auditorium. Like many cinemas of the period, it was fitted with an organ. It was seen as a 'scruffy relation' to the nearby Palladium, and was known as the 'flea pit'. In 1913, it became known as the Brixton Pavilion. Sound films began showing in 1929.

The neighbouring Brixton Theatre was completely destroyed by bombing in 1940, which allowed the Ritzy to expand into the vacant space.

In 1954, it was renovated by noted cinema architect George Coles, who installed CinemaScope: the cinema was renamed "the Pullman" and the organ was removed. In 1964, it became part of the Classic cinema chain and was later renamed "the Classic", before closure in 1976. In 1978 it was saved from demolition and reopened as "The Little Bit Ritzy", run in collaboration with London Cinema Collective, becoming an arthouse cinema. A collaboration between Lambeth Council and the management of the time ensured the cinema's survival, with the facade being rebuilt and restored to near-original condition. It was soon known as just "The Ritzy".

During the 1980s, the cinema developed a reputation as having a left-wing agenda, so much so that the incumbent manager was motivated to place an advert in the local press advising potential patrons that not every film that the cinema screened was "left-wing or gay".

In 1991, The Ritzy was sold to the Oasis Cinemas Group, a division of the Island Group owned by PolyGram, who also owned Gate Cinema in Notting Hill Gate and The Cameo, Edinburgh. In May 1993 it closed for a £4.5 million renovation and reopened on 29 September 1995 with the main screen renovated plus four new screens.

Today, the cinema is owned by Picturehouse Cinemas, and operates as a multi-screen complex with bar and café facilities. Its official name is now "Ritzy Picturehouse" although it is still commonly known as the Ritzy Cinema. In 1999, Albion Ventures invested £8million in Picturehouse to help fund the development of several of their cinemas, including the Ritzy.

In 2009, the decor and colour scheme was restored from its original style and a live music venue was added, called Upstairs.

== Living wage dispute ==
There has been an ongoing labour dispute from Ritzy Cinema Workers since 2007, when staff were paid £5.35 per hour. City Screen, which then owned Picturehouse Cinemas since 2003, refused to recognise the Broadcasting, Entertainment, Communications and Theatre Union (BECTU) union and set up an alternative called 'The Forum'. After a court case, BECTU was recognised and negotiations began in 2004.

The dispute re-emerged in 2014 over the payment of the London Living Wage. Picturehouse has stated that "we cannot predict the future levels of the London Living Wage and we cannot build a business plan around a rate that is not within our ability to forecast."

Picturehouse says that it pays its staff a 'fair wage' of £9.10 per hour, compared to the voluntary London Living Wage of £10.20. Strike action by staff continued in 2017 following the sacking of representatives of the BECTU union which represents cinema workers. Public figures such as Sir Ian McKellen, Ken Loach, Benedict Cumberbatch, Andrew Garfield and then shadow chancellor John McDonnell have publicly supported the campaign. Sacked staff representatives whose cases were heard at employment tribunal were unanimously found to be unfairly dismissed by the company, citing a 'lack of neutrality at the investigation and disciplinary stages'.
