= Sarah Steel =

Australian journalist and podcast host

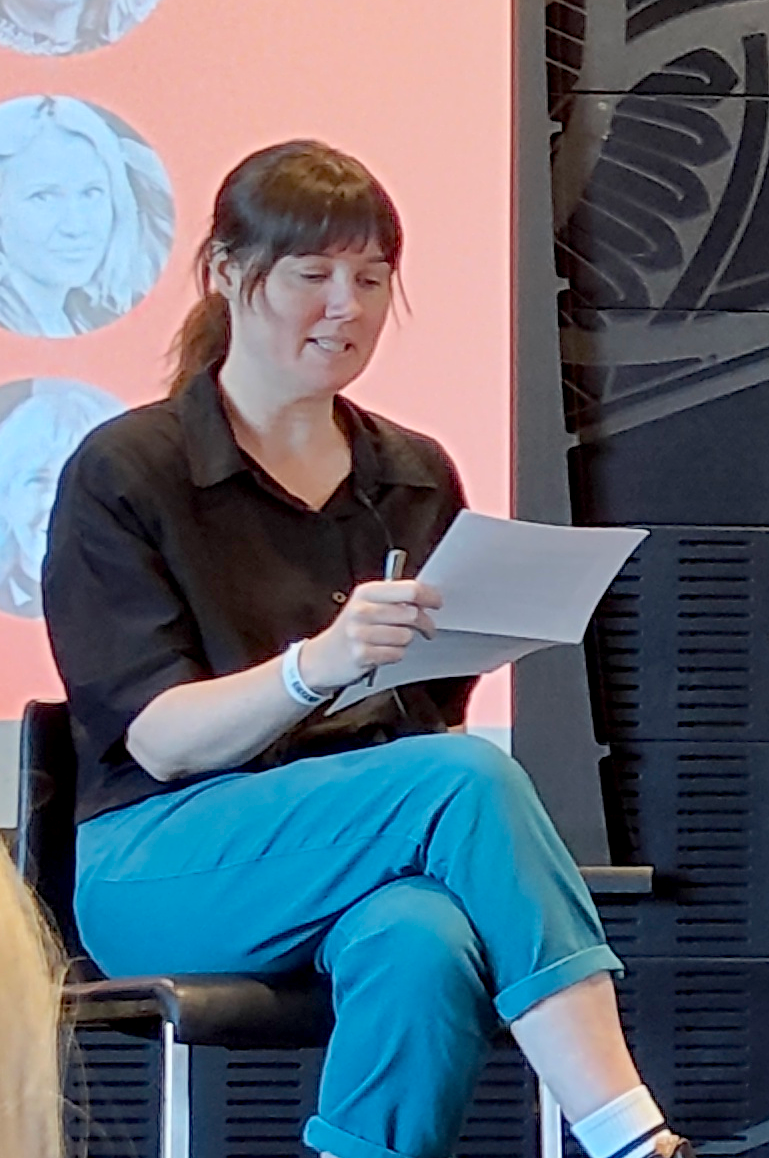
- Steel speaking at the Decult conference, 2024
- Occupations: Journalist, podcast host
- Known for: Let's Talk About Sects
- Notable work: Do As I Say (2022)

Sarah Steel is an Australian journalist and podcast host known for her work on cults and coercive control.

In a 2022 feature, the Australian Broadcasting Corporation (ABC) described Steel as having "spent years interviewing cult survivors" for her podcast Let's Talk About Sects.

== Career ==
Steel is the creator and host of the podcast Let's Talk About Sects, which examines cults and high-control groups. The podcast was launched in 2018.

The podcast won the Independent True Crime category at the 2019 Australian Podcast Awards.

In 2022, Steel published Do As I Say, a book about cults and coercive control drawing on her research and interviews.

Steel has appeared on Australian Broadcasting Corporation programs discussing cults and related issues, including Radio National and triple j.

In 2019, Mediaweek listed Steel among speakers at the ABC OzPod podcasting industry event, referring to her as the host of the award-winning podcast.

== Works ==
- Do As I Say: The Essential Guide to Understanding Cults and Coercive Control (2022) ISBN 978-1761262395

== Awards ==
In 2025 Sarah was a co-recipient of the Ethical Media Award from The Freedom Train Project.
