= Trevor Hardy =

British serial killer (beast of Manchester) (1945–2012)

- Born: Trevor Joseph Hardy; 11 June 1945; Newton Heath, Manchester, England
- Died: 25 September 2012 (aged 67); HM Prison Wakefield, West Yorkshire, England
- Other names: The Beast of Manchester; The Monster of Manchester
- Penalty: Life Imprisonment

Details
- Victims: 3
- Span of crimes: 31 December 1974 – 8 March 1976
- Country: England
- State: Manchester
- Date apprehended: August 1976

Trevor Joseph Hardy (11 June 1945 – 25 September 2012), also known as the Beast of Manchester, was a convicted English serial killer who murdered three teenage girls in the Manchester area between December 1974 and March 1976. In 1977, he was found guilty on three charges of murder and was sentenced to life imprisonment, remaining in prison until his death 35 years later.

== Murders ==
Janet Lesley Stewart, 15, was stabbed to death on New Year's Eve 1974 and buried in a shallow grave in Newton Heath, North Manchester. Wanda Skala, 17, was murdered on 19 July 1975 on Lightbowne Road, Moston while walking home from the hotel where she worked as a barmaid. She had been hit over the head with a brick, robbed and sexually assaulted. Her body was found partially buried on a building site. In March 1976 after walking home from a staff party, Sharon Mosoph, 17, was stabbed and strangled with a pair of tights prior to being dumped in the Rochdale Canal in Failsworth. The bodies of Skala and Mosoph were found stripped and mutilated.

At the height of the hunt for the serial killer, 23,000 people were stopped and searched.

== Arrest, trial and conviction ==
Although Hardy was arrested for Skala's murder after bragging about it to his younger brother, he was freed on the basis of an alibi he had arranged with his partner, Sheilagh Farrow, and because he had filed his teeth with a contraband file delivered by Farrow they would not match the bite marks found on her body. He would go on to kill Mosoph six months after being freed.

Hardy was arrested for the murders of Skala and Mosoph in August 1976. He confessed to the murders and to that of Stewart, who until then had been a missing person. Prior to Stewart's murder, Hardy had been released on parole for battering a man with a pickaxe. He reportedly mistook Stewart for a schoolgirl with whom he was infatuated. Hardy removed Stewart's ring and gave it to another girl as a "love token". Hardy had also kept Skala's blood-stained clothes and her handbag as "grisly trophies". The investigation revealed that Hardy killed Mosoph after she witnessed him attempting to burgle a shopping centre at night.

At his trial, Hardy sacked his Queen's Counsel and attempted to confess to manslaughter; however, the plea was rejected and he was found guilty of murder. On 2 May 1978, at the Manchester Crown Court, Hardy was sentenced to three life sentences for the murders with a minimum of 30 years.

Hardy served his sentence more than 30 years after his arrest at Wakefield Prison in West Yorkshire, where he was reported to have a "good work record".

He maintained his innocence and reportedly sent a letter to Mosoph's relatives blaming his parents. On 23 February 2008, The Times revealed that Hardy was one of up to 50 British prisoners currently in prison who had been issued with a whole life tariff and were unlikely to ever be released. The whole life tariff was reaffirmed in June 2008 by the High Court.

Manchester locals had long suspected Hardy in the 1971 murder of 17-year-old Dorothy Leyden, and in 2004 family members requested that the Greater Manchester Police re-examine old evidence. Detectives reviewing the cold case believe forensic evidence exonerates Hardy in the murder of Leyden, as DNA samples examined more than 30 years after the crime were found not to match Hardy.

== Death ==
Hardy collapsed in his cell at Wakefield Prison on 23 September 2012 after suffering a heart attack. He died in hospital two days later, aged 67. He had spent 35 years in prison and was one of the longest-serving prisoners in England and Wales.

== See also ==
- List of serial killers in the United Kingdom
