= Dictynna Hood =

British film director and screenwriter

Dictynna Hood, sometimes credited as D.R. Hood, is a British film director and screenwriter. She leads a module on film production for the University of Warwick at the London Film School.

== Biography ==
Hood grew up in Great Milton, Oxfordshire, and attended Oxford High School for Girls.

Her first feature film Wreckers (2011) premiered at the London Film Festival. It starred Benedict Cumberbatch and Claire Foy as a couple returning to a rural village. Her second feature film, Us Among the Stones (2019), stars Laurence Fox and Anna Calder-Marshall: The Guardian's critic called it a "somewhat oddball family reunion drama".

Her 2006 film The Other Man won the UK Film Council Kodak Award for Best British Short Film.

She is the founder and director of "likely story" film and television production company.

== Selected filmography ==
- A Marriage Made in Heaven (1992)
- Small War (1995)
- Journey Man (2002)
- The Other Man (2006)
- Wreckers (2011, starring Benedict Cumberbatch): writer and director
- Us Among the Stones (2019)
