= Roger Maunder (filmmaker) =

Canadian director, screenwriter, and producer

- Born: St. John's, Newfoundland and Labrador, Canada
- Occupations: Director; Cinematographer; Editor; Actor; Writer
- Years active: 1997–present
- Website: upskydownfilms.com

Roger Maunder is a Canadian filmmaker, writer and actor based in St. John's, Newfoundland and Labrador, Canada. He has independently produced, written, and directed a number of films including the political thriller Between Two Walls in 2014, as well as music videos for bands/musicians such as Shanneyganock and Amelia Curran. Roger created the Nickel Independent Film Festival in 2001 to allow local Newfoundland filmmakers to exhibit their film and video work. He currently runs the production company Up Sky Down Films in downtown St. John's where he continues to enjoy writing and making films.

== Filmography ==
=== As director ===
- Setting His Own Limits (2023)
- The Sisters of Mercy (2022)
- Belles with Balls (2022)
- STAND For Hannah (2021)
- Be the Change (2017)
- Between Two Walls (2014)
- Cracker Barrel (2012)
- If It's All in Your Head (2011)
- The White Balloon (2011)
- Cut from the Same Cloth (2009)
- Swallowed (2002)

=== As an actor ===
- The Grand Seduction as Factory Friend (2013)
- Talus and Scree as Dad (2013)
- The White Balloon as Daddy (2011)
- Republic of Doyle as Colin (Leslie's Date) (2010)
- Above and Beyond as Cowboy (2006)
- Making Love in St. Pierre as Harvey (2004)
- Behind the Red Door as Waiter (2003)
- Ashore as Alva (2002)
- Random Passage as Uniformed Officer #1 (2002)
- The Bingo Robbers as Jack Valentine (2001)

== Bibliography ==
=== Novels ===
- Mundy Pond (2007)
