= Nickel Film Festival =

Film festival in Canada

Coordinates: 47.5692°N 52.7026°W

Nickel Independent Film Festival
- The logo for the Nickel Independent Film Festival
- Location: LSPU Hall; St. John's, Newfoundland and Labrador, Canada
- Founded: 2001; 25 years ago
- Founded by: Roger Maunder
- Most recent: June 10-18, 2023
- Language: English
- Website: www.nickelfestival.com

The Nickel Independent Film Festival (otherwise known simply as the Nickel Film Festival) is an annual film festival held in St. John's, Newfoundland and Labrador, Canada. The festival was conceived in 2001 by filmmaker Roger Maunder to allow local filmmakers to exhibit their film and video work. The festival is named after the Nickel Theatre which was the first theatre in Newfoundland to have talking film feature movies. Since then the festival has grown to include other Canadian and even international short films, features, documentaries and music videos. The festival is held at the LSPU hall which is run by the Resource Centre for the Arts, an artist-run company.

In 2020, the festival celebrated its 20th anniversary virtually due to the COVID-19 pandemic in Canada. The program featured premieres of shorts and features, workshops, film challenges, and a retrospective of classic Newfoundland titles from the festival's two decades of screenings, all screened on an online platform.

== See also ==
- St. John's International Women's Film Festival
