= The End of the Pier International Film Festival =

Coordinates: 50°48′N 0°22′W

The End of the Pier International Film Festival was a not-for profit independent film festival based in West Sussex, England. The festival began in 2002 and showed work by local film makers, but it has since grown to showcase shorts and features from all over the world. There are also extensive educational and heritage projects surrounding the festival.

Venues used by the festival have included the Ritz Cinema in Worthing's Connaught Theatre and the Grade II* listed Dome Cinema. The festival was first held Bognor Regis, before moving to Worthing in 2009. Reasons cited for the move were enthusiastic support for the festival in Worthing. The 2013 event returned to Bognor Regis.

Awards at the festival include End Of The Pier International Film Festival Grand Prix, Best UK Feature Drama, Best UK Feature Documentary, Best Short Drama, Best Comedy Drama Short Film, Best Animation, Best Experimental Short Film, Best Documentary Short, Best European Short Film, Best International Short Film and Short Film Scriptwriting.

== Past winners ==
=== 2011 ===
- End Of The Pier International Film Festival Grand Prix: 'A Brunette Kiss' - Edilberto Restino, UK
- Best Short Drama Film Award: 'Vacant Possession' - Rob MacGillivray - UK
- Best Comedy Drama Short Film Award: 'It's All About The Little Things' - Roberto Gomez Martin, UK
- Best Animation Award: 'Extreme Makeovary' - Dean Packis, US
- Best Actor award: 'A Brunette Kiss' - Adrian Bouchet - Edilberto Restino, UK

=== 2010 ===
- End Of The Pier International Film Festival Grand Prix: 'The Cost of Love' - Carl Medland, UK
- Best UK Feature Drama: ‘Release’ - Christian Martin & Darren Flaxstone, UK
- Best UK Feature Documentary: 'Chopin's Dentist' - Ann Feloy & Roberto Gomez Martin, UK
- Best Short Film Script: 'Penny Falls' by Georgie Kuna, UK.
- Best Short Comedy: 'Bride and Gloom' - Gurbaksh Ronak Singh, UK

=== 2009 ===
- End Of The Pier International Film Festival Grand Prix: 'Clamp & Grind' - Prasanna Puwanarajah, UK
- Best International Feature: Don't Think About White Monkeys - Yuri Mamin Russia
- Best Design in Film: Red Letter - Edilberto Restino

=== 2008 ===
- 2nd prize ‘Best Short Drama’ - For a few marbles more - Jelmar Hufen, The Netherlands
- 2nd prize ‘Best Short European Drama’ - For a few marbles more - Jelmar Hufen, The Netherlands
