= Shooting People =

Social network of filmmakers

- Website type: Independent filmmaker network
- Available in: English
- Headquarters: London, {{{location_country}}}
- Founders: Cath Le Couteur (Founder); Jess Search (Founder)
- Key people: Cath Le Couteur (Founder); Jess Search (Founder); Stuart Tily (CTO)
- Website: shootingpeople.org
- Commercial: yes
- Registration: Required
- Launched: 1998
- Current status: Closed (2025)
- Content license: All rights reserved. Use permitted with copyright notice intact.

Shooting People was an international network for independent filmmakers, founded in 1998 by Cath Le Couteur, Jess Search and Stu Tily. The organisation facilitated collaboration, connections, training opportunities and knowledge sharing among independent filmmakers, and became known for its open, DIY ethos and community-led approach.

The network was widely cited as an influential grassroots filmmaking community and was covered by publications including Screen Daily, The Guardian and the British Film Institute.

After 27 years of continuous activity, Shooting People concluded its operations in 2025, while keeping a curated selection of resources online for archival and practical use.

== History ==
=== 1998–2005: Founding and early development ===
Shooting People began in 1998 during the early years of internet use in the United Kingdom. Co-founders Cath Le Couteur, Jess Search and Stu Tily initially set it up as an email list between around 60 filmmaker friends, conceived as an online community to encourage and connect independent filmmakers through peer-to-peer support.

The network quickly developed a reputation for its DIY, punk-inflected approach to filmmaking culture, emphasising openness, experimentation and mutual support among early-career filmmakers. Netribution described this era as part of a “post-web/pre-tech-dystopia, open, queer-punk peer-to-peer culture”.

As more filmmakers gained internet access, the list expanded into a membership network with daily email bulletins across filmmaking, screenwriting, casting, documentary and animation. Its peer-to-peer, community-first model, based on open information sharing rather than traditional gatekeeping, made it an early and influential example of a UK online filmmaking community.

=== 2006–2015: Expansion, competitions and growth ===
During this period, Shooting People launched flagship initiatives including Film of the Month, Short Cuts and later New Shoots. These programmes were judged by leading practitioners including Andrea Arnold, Danny Boyle, Mike Figgis, Sally Potter, Peter Strickland and Stephen Woolley. Writing as a Film of the Month judge, Woolley commented on the strength and variety of the shorts and the difficulty of choosing a winner because they were “all attempting to achieve different things from stylistically different angles”.

Industry figures including Woolley and Asif Kapadia have described the community's ethos as distinctly independent and “punk” in spirit, noting its openness to unconventional voices and grassroots creativity.

The community grew significantly during this time, expanding its active discussion forums, crew directories, funding listings, job boards and live events.

=== 2016–2024: Peak activity and legacy building ===
By the late 2010s, Shooting People had become one of the largest and longest-running independent film communities in the UK. Many alumni went on to become BAFTA, BIFA and Academy Award nominees or winners, and several have credited the network with supporting early stages of their careers.

The organisation hosted filmmaker Q&As, screenings, masterclasses and community events, including the "Mobile Cinema" project, which toured short films across the UK and was profiled in The Times.

It also became known for widely shared community discussions, including a comedic exchange with NASA regarding the quality of films held on the International Space Station, reported in The Guardian.

=== 2025: Closure ===
In October 2025, Shooting People announced that its active operations would conclude after 27 years. Co-founder Cath Le Couteur stated that while the platform was ending, “what continues is the spirit: community, imagination, collaboration”.

Following its closure, the website remains online in a limited form, maintaining filmmaker resources, a funding database and a curated selection of award-winning short films.

== Activities and programmes ==
=== Resources and online services ===
Shooting People operated a wide range of online tools for filmmakers, including:

- daily bulletins
- crew and job listings
- a funding and opportunities database
- filmmaker profiles and networking tools
- festival, competition and training directories
- community-led Q&A forums

These services helped lower access barriers and facilitated independent film production.

=== Competitions and awards ===
Long-running competitions included:

- Film of the Month
- Short Cuts
- New Shoots

These offered exposure, mentorship and feedback to emerging filmmakers from established practitioners.

=== Events and masterclasses ===
Shooting People hosted screenings, networking events, filmmaker Q&As and workshops featuring directors, actors, producers and crew from across the independent film sector. The organisation also staged the "Mobile Cinema" touring project across the UK, which was covered in The Times.

=== Publications and releases ===
In addition to its online activities, Shooting People developed several publishing projects to support independent filmmakers. In 2004 it released the handbook Get Your Film Funded: UK Film Finance Guide, outlining funding options and financial structures available to UK filmmakers.

In 2005 the organisation produced the Best vs Best DVD series, showcasing selected short films from the Shooting People community. The first volume, Best v Best, Volume 1, was reviewed in The Guardian, which noted the collection’s range and inventive filmmaking.

== International partnerships ==
=== New Shoots: International ===
Through a partnership with the British Council’s International Collaboration Grants, Shooting People launched New Shoots: International, connecting filmmakers in the United Kingdom and Algeria for:

- cross-cultural workshops
- creative knowledge-sharing
- international project development
- networking across independent film organisations

== Impact and legacy ==
For more than two decades, Shooting People played a significant role in the UK independent film sector. Its decentralised, community-led model provided a counterpoint to traditional film-industry pathways and supported the early careers of many filmmakers.

Among those publicly associated with the network are filmmakers and writers including Asif Kapadia, Andrew Haigh, Alice Lowe, Ben Wheatley, Rungano Nyoni and Jack Thorne, all of whom have gone on to receive significant international recognition within the film industry.

Commentators have noted that Shooting People maintained a notably DIY and anti-hierarchical character throughout its operation, positioning it as a "punk-spirited" alternative to more formal industry institutions.

Following its closure in 2025, its remaining online resources continue to be used by filmmakers and researchers.
