= The Cameo, Edinburgh =

Cinema in Edinburgh, Scotland

The Cameo
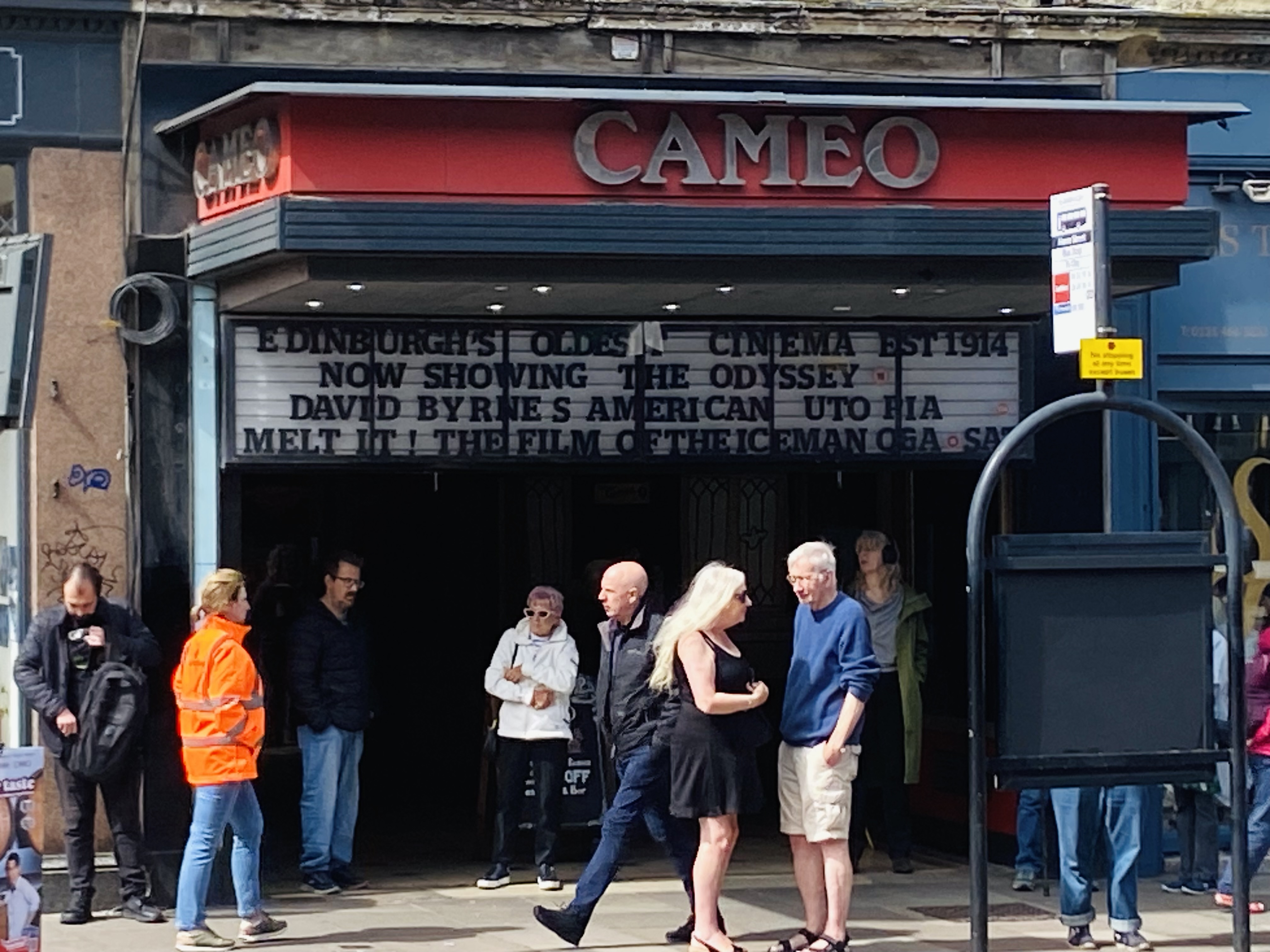
- The Cameo in August 2026

- Location within Edinburgh city centre
- Former names: King's Cinema (1914–1949)
- Address: 38 Home St; Edinburgh; Scotland
- Coordinates: 55.94284°N 3.20421°W
- Owner: Cineworld
- Operator: Picturehouse Cinemas
- Screen: 3

Construction
- Opened: 1914
- Years active: 1914–1982, 1986–

Website
- www.picturehouses.com/cinema/the-cameo

The Cameo is a cinema in Tollcross, Edinburgh, Scotland that has a long tradition of showing art house films, becoming an important venue for the Edinburgh International Film Festival. It opened on 8 January 1914, making it one of the oldest cinemas in Scotland still in use. It showed silent films until 1930. It retains many original architectural and design features and became a Category B listed status by Historic Scotland in 2006. Since 1992 it has had three screens. The Cameo was independent until 2003, when it was taken over by a chain.

== History ==
The cinema opened as the King's Cinema on 8 January 1914. The original screen was mirrored, the first mirrored screen in Scotland. There were 673 seats in an auditorium showing silent films with orchestral accompaniment, supplied at one time by Madam Egger's Ladies' Costume Orchestra. In 1930 the cinema was fitted for sound and started showing talkies. The space has been left largely unchanged structurally, but the audience now have better sightlines and more comfort, with less than half the original number of seats. There is an abundance of ornamental plasterwork: columns, cornices, decorative mouldings on walls and ceilings.

=== Jim Poole ===
In 1947 the cinema was purchased by Jim Poole (1911–1998), a member of the Poole family, known for their touring Myriorama shows and who ran cinemas in Scotland and England. He had been in charge of two of the family's cinemas in Aberdeen before the Second World War, and after a posting as army entertainments officer in the Middle East, wanted to open a venue in Edinburgh where he could show foreign films. The cinema was refurbished and was renamed the Cameo by the new owner, re-opening in 1949.

The Cameo included art house and 'continental' films in its repertoire and started its association with the Edinburgh Film Festival in 1949, when it presented a 'Continental Film Festival', including a screen version of Sartre's Les jeux sont faits, alongside the documentaries being shown by the Edinburgh Film Guild. Monsieur Hulot's Holiday (1953) and Annie Hall (1977) were among Poole's successes in attracting good audiences for films not being shown by the big chains.

Poole had begun by rescuing a decaying building with a leaky roof. Later he was able to take over an adjacent shop and applied for the cinema to be licensed to sell alcoholic drinks. In December 1963, it became the first cinema bar in the city, despite neighbours' objections.

Once the Edinburgh Filmhouse had opened in 1979 a few hundred yards away, the Cameo was no longer the only public cinema in Edinburgh showing alternative and foreign-language films. When Poole retired in September 1982 the Cameo shut, and was put on the market as a 483 seat single screen cinema.

=== After 1986 ===
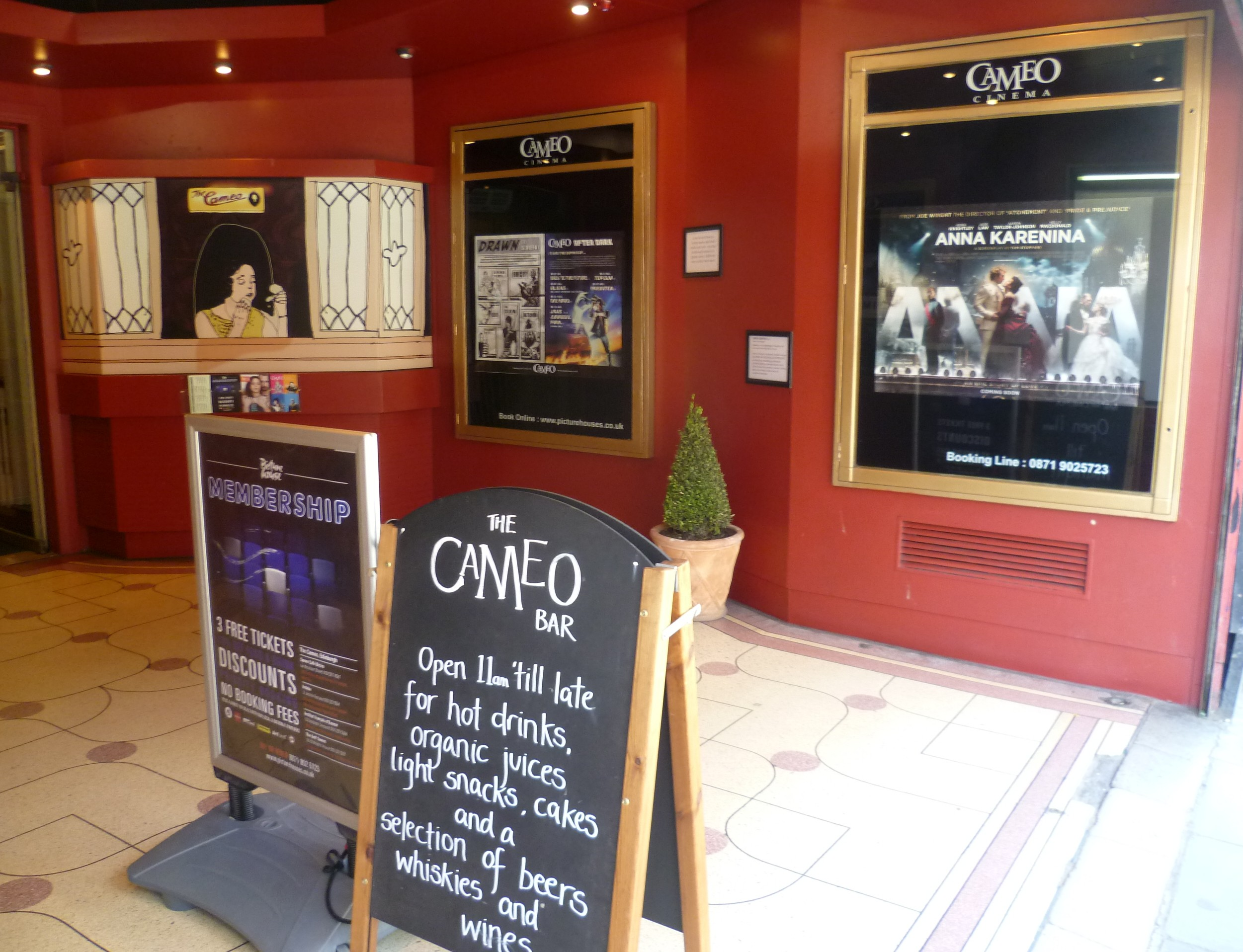
Cameo Cinema entrance, 2012

After a new owner Recorded Cinema took possession, there was refurbishment at the cost of £150,000, then a gala re-opening in August 1986 as a 420 seat cinema. More neighbouring shops were acquired to create space for second and third screens which opened in the early 1990s.

In 2005, City Screen now owned the Cameo, and had plans to change the original auditorium into a bar-restaurant. These were eventually withdrawn after a well-supported 'Save the Cameo' campaign influenced council decision-making.

In September 2006 Historic Scotland upgraded the conservation status of the cinema to a B listing, protecting the interior from future alteration. The cinema, and the full tenement it is part of, was awarded Category B listed status by Historic Scotland in 2006. The Cinema Theatre Association had campaigned for this after the owners put the Cameo up for sale. The owners took it off the market and relaunched in the three-screen configuration. They drew up new refurbishment plans, and invited contributions from sponsors.

A rare surviving print of La symphonie pastorale, the first film shown after the King's Cinema became the Cameo in March 1949, was shown in March 2009 to celebrate the 60th anniversary of the Cameo.

In January 2010, the cinema was named in a feature in The Guardian as one of the '10 best' independent cinemas, alongside other British venues. The main auditorium now had 253 seats and plenty of legroom.

In 2012, the Picturehouse chain, which now owned 21 cinemas including the Cameo, was bought by Cineworld.

== Architecture ==
Behind a modern shopfront, much of the cinema's original architectural character remains. The entrance lobby has a terrazzo floor and one of the original pair of ticket kiosks. An inner foyer leads to the main cinema built within the 'back green' or 'back court' (courtyard) of a tenement block. Cinemas were once built like this elsewhere in Scotland, the biggest being the Rosevale in Partick, but the Cameo is the only one still operating.

== Famous visitors ==
Lillian Gish, Orson Welles, Melina Mercouri and Cary Grant all visited the cinema in one Festival season or another. Sean Connery, who was born nearby, opened the bar in 1963. More recently Quentin Tarantino was there when Pulp Fiction opened in 1994 and Irvine Welsh was at the Cameo for the World première of Trainspotting in February 1996.

Other famous visitors throughout the years include Danny Boyle, Richard E. Grant, Fred Zinnemann, Robert Carlyle, Michèle Morgan, Peter Mullan, Christine Lahti, Mark Kermode, Claire Denis, Rutger Hauer, Liam Gallagher, Patsy Kensit, Ewan McGregor, Tim Roth, Guy Ritchie, Ken Loach, Bruce Campbell, Billy Bragg, Park Chan-wook, Ray Winstone, Robyn Hitchcock, Neil Jordan, Roy Keane, Charlize Theron, Duncan Jones, Michael Redgrave, Jim Dale, Gael Garcia Bernal, Diego Luna, Alfonso Cuarón, Alejandro González Iñárritu, John Cusack, Tommy Wiseau and Danny Dyer.

== In popular culture ==
The cinema appears in Sylvain Chomet's film The Illusionist. While hiding from the young couple, the main character, Tatischeff, accidentally enters the cinema, where Jacques Tati's Mon Oncle is playing. This is an in-joke as Tatischeff is largely based on Tati, the film itself having been adapted from a script of his. Other films with scenes filmed inside the Cameo include Helena Bonham Carter's Women Talking Dirty and Richard Jobson's A Woman in Winter.

The cinema serves as the inspiration for the fictional Paradise Cinema in the novel Children of Paradise by Canadian-born author Camilla Grudova, after Grudova spent a period of time working there following her relocation to Scotland.
