= Cinema16 =

British DVD company

- Industry: Entertainment
- Products: Motion pictures
- Website: Cinema16 website

Cinema16 is a small British DVD company who release "classic & award winning short films on DVD".

The compilations they release feature short films from famous directors such as Christopher Nolan, Tim Burton, Ridley Scott, Guillermo del Toro, Jean-Luc Godard, Mike Leigh and George Lucas, as well as work by less well known names. Most of the films also feature commentary tracks, usually by the director.

== Releases ==
Cinema16 have so far released five DVDs:

Title	Region Code	PAL/NTSC	Number of Shorts	Notes
British Short Films	Region 0	PAL	16	Four shorts are also available on European Short Films: US Edition.
European Short Films	Region 2	PAL	16	Seven shorts are also available on European Short Films: US Edition.
American Short Films	Region 0	NTSC	16	
European Short Films: Special US Edition	Region 0	NTSC	16	Two discs. Contains four shorts not on any other Cinema16 DVD.
World Short Films	Region 0	NTSC	16	Two discs. Wasp is also available on European Short Films: US Edition.

== List of films ==
The five releases have included a total of 68 short films by 67 directors. The films are:

Title	Director	Year	Commentary	Available on	Notes
About a Girl	Brian Percival	2001	by Brian Percival & writer Julie Rutterford	British Short Films	Won the BAFTA for Best Short Film in 2002.
Attack on the Bakery	Naoto Yamakawa	1982	by Naoto Yamakawa	World Short Films	
Bara Prata Lite (Talk)	Lukas Moodysson	1997	by Lukas Moodysson	European Short Films	
Le Batteur Du Boléro	Patrice Leconte	1992	by Patrice Leconte	European Short Films	
Before Dawn	Bálint Kanyeres	2005		European Short Films: US Edition	
Borom Sarret	Ousmane Sembène	1963	by the director's son, Alain	World Short Films	
Boy & Bicycle	Ridley Scott	1958	by Ridley Scott	British Short Films, European Short Films: US Edition	Scott's first film. Stars Tony Scott.
Carmen	Alexander Payne	1985	by Alexander Payne	American Short Films	
Charlotte et Veronique, ou Tous les garcons s'appellent Patrick	Jean-Luc Godard	1957	by author Colin MacCabe	European Short Films	
Koncert Zyczen (Concert of Wishes)	Krzysztof Kieslowski	1968	by author Marek Haltof	European Short Films	
Copy Shop	Virgil Widrich	2001	by Virgil Widrich	European Short Films, European Short Films: US Edition	Oscar nominated.
Daybreak Express	D.A. Pennebaker	1953	by D.A. Pennebaker	American Short Films	
Dear Phone	Peter Greenaway	1976	by Peter Greenaway	British Short Films	
The Discipline of D.E.	Gus Van Sant	1982	None	American Short Films	
Doña Lupe	Guillermo del Toro	1983–1984	by Guillermo del Toro	World Short Films	
Doodlebug	Christopher Nolan	1997	by Christopher Nolan	British Short Films, European Short Films: US Edition	
Eight	Stephen Daldry	1998	by Stephen Daldry & producer Jon Finn	British Short Films	Daldry's first film.
Election Night (Valgaften)	Anders Thomas Jensen	1998	by Anders Thomas Jensen	European Short Films, European Short Films: US Edition	Winner of the Oscar for Best Short Film in 1998.
Epilog	Tom Tykwer	1992	by Tom Tykwer	European Short Films	
Feelings	Todd Solondz	1984	by author Jordi Costa	American Short Films	
Fierrot le pou	Mathieu Kassovitz	1990	None	European Short Films: US Edition	
Five Feet High and Rising	Peter Sollett	1999	by Peter Sollett & producer Eva Vives	American Short Films	Won the Jury Prize at the Sundance Film Festival in 2000.
Forklift driver klaus	Stefan Prehn & Jorg Wagner	2000	by Jorg Wagner & Stefan Prehn	World Short Films	Won "numerous awards".
Freiheit	George Lucas	1966	by George Lucas	American Short Films	
Fridge	Peter Mullan	1996	by Peter Mullan	European Short Films	
Gasman	Lynne Ramsay	1997	by Lynne Ramsay	British Short Films, European Short Films: US Edition	Won the Jury Prize at Cannes in 1998.
George Lucas in Love	Joe Nussbaum	1999	by Joe Nussbaum & producer Joseph Levy	American Short Films	"George Lucas wrote to the filmmakers to let them know he was amused by the film."
Il Giorno della prima di Close Up (The Opening Day of Close-Up)	Nanni Moretti	1996	by Nanni Moretti	European Short Films, European Short Films: US Edition	
The Girl Chewing Gum	John Smith	1976	by John Smith	British Short Films	
A Girl's Own Story	Jane Campion	1984	None	World Short Films	
Gisele Kerozene	Jan Kounen	1999	by Jan Kounen	European Short Films	
Härlig är jorden (World of Glory)	Roy Andersson	1991	by Roy Andersson	European Short Films, European Short Films: US Edition	
Home	Morag McKinnon	1998	by Morag McKinnon	British Short Films	Won the BAFTA for Best Short Film in 1999.
L'Homme Sans Tete (The Man Without a Head)	Juan Solanas	2003	by Juan Solanas	European Short Films, European Short Films: US Edition	Won the Jury Prize at Cannes in 2003.
Inside Out	Tom Guard & Charles Guard	1999	by Tom & Charles Guard	British Short Films	
Jabberwocky	Jan Švankmajer	1971	by author Peter Hames	European Short Films, European Short Films: US Edition	
Joyride	Jim Gillespie	1995	by Jim Gillespie & producer Angus Lamont	British Short Films	
Je t'aime John Wayne	Toby MacDonald	2000	by Toby MacDonald, writer Luke Ponte & producer Luke Morris	British Short Films, European Short Films: US Edition	
Judgement (Simpan)	Park Chan-wook	1999	by Park Chan-wook	World Short Films	
The Lunch Date	Adam Davidson	1990	by Adam Davidson	American Short Films	Winner of the Oscar for Best Short Film in 1991. Also winner of the Palme d'Or for Best Short Film at Cannes.
Madame Tutli-Putli	Chris Lavis & Maciek Szczerbowski	2007	by Chris Lavis & Maciek Szczerbowski	World Short Films	Oscar nominated. Winner of 36 awards.
Meshes of the Afternoon	Maya Deren	1943	None	American Short Films	
My Dad is 100 Years Old	Guy Maddin	1983	by Guy Maddin	World Short Films	
My Wrongs #8245-8249 & 117	Chris Morris	2003	by the production runner	European Short Films	BAFTA winner.
Necrology (Roll Call of the Dead)	Standish Lawder	1969–1970	by Standish Lawder	American Short Films	
Nocturne	Lars von Trier	1980	by Lars von Trier & Tomas Gisslasson	European Short Films, European Short Films: US Edition	
Paperboys	Mike Mills	2001	by Mike Mills	American Short Films	
Quartet for the End of Time	Alfonso Cuarón	1983	by Alfonso Cuarón	World Short Films	
Rabbit	Run Wrake	2005	by Run Wrake	European Short Films: US Edition	
Screen Test: Helmut	Andy Warhol	1964	None	American Short Films	One of over 500 Screen Test films made by Warhol.
El Secdleto De La Tlompeta	Javier Fesser	1995	by Jordi Costa	European Short Films	
The Sheep Thief	Asif Kapadia	1997	by Asif Kapadia	British Short Films	
The Short & Curlies	Mike Leigh	1987	by Mike Leigh	British Short Films	First in Channel 4's series of short films by this name.
Sikumi (On the Ice)	Andrew Okpeaha MacLean	2008	by Andrew MacLean & Cara Marcous	World Short Films	Won the Jury Prize at the Sundance Film Festival in 2008.
Six Shooter	Martin McDonagh	2005		European Short Films: US Edition	Winner of the Oscar for Best Short Film in 2006. BAFTA nominated.
Soft	Simon Ellis	2006	by Simon Ellis	World Short Films	BAFTA nominated. Winner of "countless" awards. Ellis is the only director to have more than one film featured on Cinema16 DVDs.
Sonata for Hitler	Alexander Sokurov	1979–1989	None	World Short Films	
Telling Lies	Simon Ellis	2000	by Simon Ellis	British Short Films	Ellis is the only director to have more than one film featured on Cinema16 DVDs.
Terminal Bar	Stefan Nadelman	2003	by Stefan Nadelman	American Short Films	Won the Jury Prize at the Sundance Film Festival in 2003.
Terry Tate: Office Linebacker	Rawson Marshall Thurber	2003	by Rawson Marshall Thurber	American Short Films	First in a series of shorts, though only one is included.
Two Cars, One Night	Taika Waititi	2003	by Taika Waititi	World Short Films	Oscar nominated.
UK Images	Martin Parr	1997	by Martin Parr	British Short Films	
Uncle	Adam Elliot	1996	by Adam Elliot	World Short Films	
La Vieille Dame et les Pigeons (The Old Lady and the Pigeons)	Sylvain Chomet	1998	by Sylvain Chomet	World Short Films	Oscar nominated.
Vincent	Tim Burton	1982	None	American Short Films	Narrated by Vincent Price.
Wasp	Andrea Arnold	2003	None	World Short Films, European Short Films: US Edition	Winner of the Oscar for Best Short Film in 2005, as well as over 30 international festival awards.
Who's My Favourite Girl?	Adrian J. McDowall	1999	by Adrian J. McDowall	British Short Films	Won a BAFTA in 2000.
The Wraith of Cobble Hill	Adam Parrish King	2005	by Adam Parrish King	American Short Films	Won the Jury Prize at the Sundance Film Festival in 2006.
