= Cinema 16: British Short Films =

- Directed by: Various
- Produced by: Luke Morris
- Production company: Cinema16
- Distributed by: Cinema16
- Release date: 2007
- Running time: 201 minutes
- Country: United Kingdom
- Language: English

Cinema16: British Short Films is a DVD featuring British short films directed by the likes of Ridley Scott, Christopher Nolan, and Mike Leigh, as well as less well known names. It is the first in a series of DVDs released by Cinema16.

== Contents ==
The short films included are About a Girl, Boy and Bicycle, Dear Phone, Doodlebug, Eight (1998 film), Gasman (1998 film), The Girl Chewing Gum, Home, Joyride, Inside Out, Je t'aime John Wayne, The Sheep Thief, The Short & Curlies, Telling Lies, UK Images, and Who's My Favourite Girl?.

All films are accompanied by audio commentaries.

== Reception ==
An Empire review said, "it's like having a complete film festival in the comfort of your own home." This quote is often cited by a sticker on the DVD's cover.
