= Cinema 16: American Short Films =

- Directed by: Various
- Produced by: Luke Morris; Ben Lederman (co-producer)
- Distributed by: Momac Films/ Warp Films
- Release date: 2006
- Running time: 209 minutes
- Country: United States
- Language: English

Cinema16: American Short Films is a DVD featuring American short films from directors such as Tim Burton, Alexander Payne, Maya Deren and George Lucas, as well as less well known names. It is the fourth in a series of DVDs released by Cinema16.

== Contents ==
The short films included are The Lunch Date, Five Feet High and Rising, Freiheit, Daybreak Express, Vincent, Terminal Bar, Terry Tate: Office Linebacker, Necrology, The Discipline of D. E., The Wraith of Cobble Hill, George Lucas in Love, Meshes of the Afternoon, Carmen, Feelings, Paperboys, and Screen Test: Helmut.

== Reception ==
A Pixel Surgeon review says, "this an important collection, and an essential must-have item for any film lover. You really have no right to call yourself a cineaste if this DVD isn't gracing your shelves."

An Eye for Film review says, "The standard of work is very high and this collection is a must for film buffs everywhere."

A Digitally Obsessed review says, "A necessarily varied lot, and a good overview of American filmmaking on a small scale. The commentary tracks are particularly astute, as well."
