= Deborah Lurie =

American composer

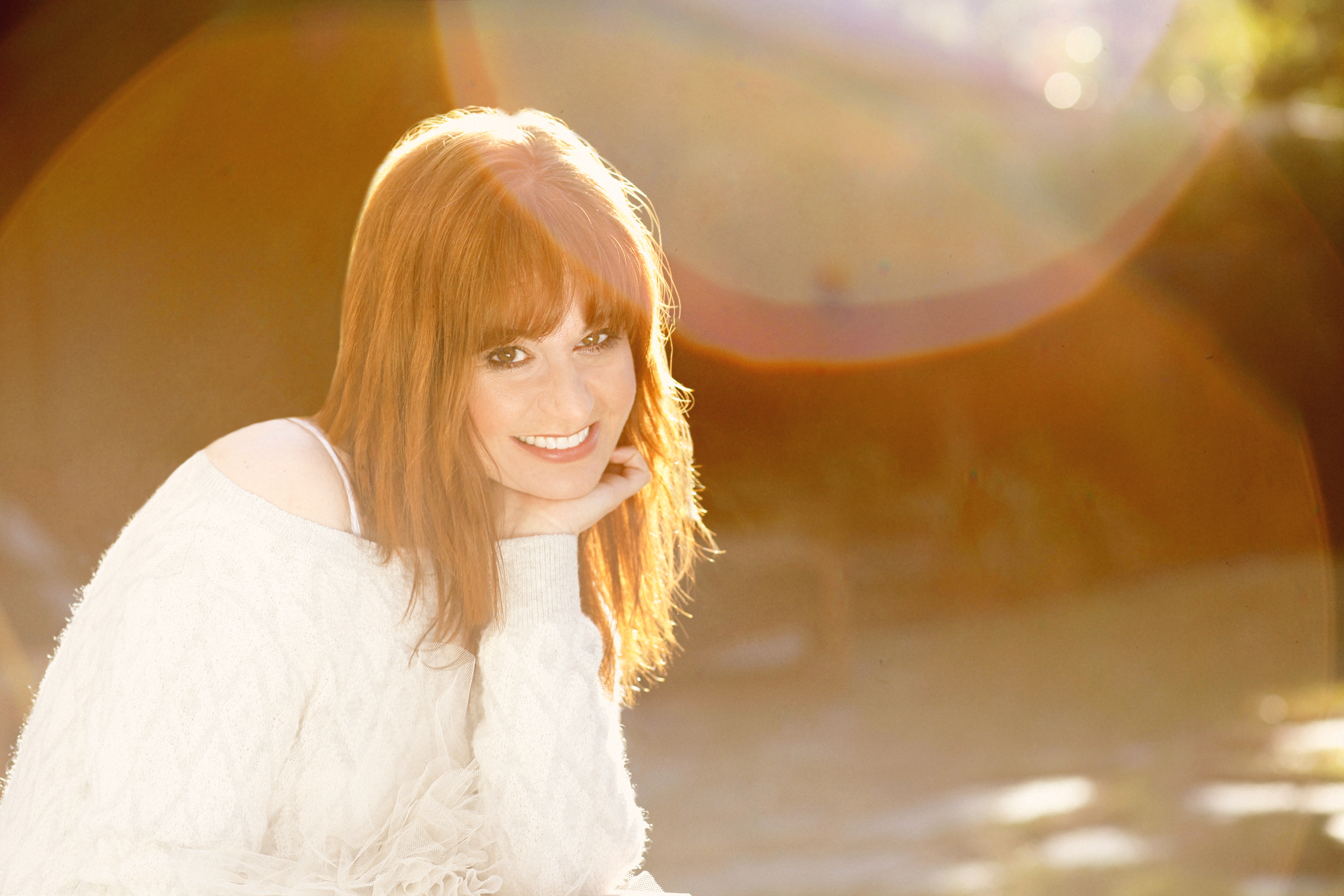
- Lurie in 2013

Background information
- Born: Deborah Ruth Lurie; March 9, 1974 (age 52); Boston, Massachusetts, United States
- Genres: Film score, incidental music
- Occupations: Composer, arranger, music producer
- Years active: 1997–present
- Website: www.deborahlurie.com

Deborah Ruth Lurie (born March 9, 1974) is an American composer, arranger, and music producer. She has scored several films such as Sleepover (2004), An Unfinished Life, Mozart and the Whale, (both 2005), Sydney White (2007), Dear John (2010), One for the Money (2012), Safe Haven (2013), and Poms (2019). She has been a string arranger for musicians such as Brandi Carlile, Kelly Clarkson, Allison Iraheta, Adam Lambert, and Katy Perry. Lurie has also been a string arranger for several rock bands such as 3 Doors Down, Bon Jovi, Creed, Halestorm, Papa Roach, Simple Plan, The All-American Rejects, and Three Days Grace, though her best known collaborations have been with Hoobastank and Theory of a Deadman.

In 2015, the American Society of Composers, Authors and Publishers awarded Lurie the Shirley Walker Award for her contributions to the diversity of film and television music. She was one of the composers interviewed in Score: A Film Music Documentary. The Academy of Motion Picture Arts and Sciences extended membership to Lurie in 2016 for her contributions to motion pictures.

== Filmography ==
=== Composer ===
Year	Title	Director	Studio(s)	Notes
1997	The Promise	Matthew Barry	—N/a	Short film
1998	Hercules: The Animated Series	Phil Weinstein	Walt Disney Television Animation; Buena Vista Television	Additional music
1999	Evil Hill	Ryan Schifrin	—N/a	Short film
1999	George Lucas in Love	Joe Nussbaum	MediaTrip.com	Short film
1999	Best Man in Grass Creek	John Newcombe	—N/a	—N/a
2001	Bubble Boy	Blair Hayes	Buena Vista Pictures; Touchstone Pictures	Additional music
2003	View from the Top	Bruno Barreto	Brad Grey Pictures; Miramax Films	Additional music Uncredited
2004	My Baby's Daddy	Cheryl Dunye	Miramax; Brillstein-Grey Entertainment; Immortal Entertainment	Additional music
2004	My Name Is Modesty	Scott Spiegel	Miramax Films	—N/a
2004	Sleepover	Joe Nussbaum	Metro-Goldwyn-Mayer	—N/a
2004	Imaginary Heroes	Dan Harris	Sony Pictures Classics	—N/a
2005	Drop Dead Sexy	Michael Philip	Lionsgate	—N/a
2005	Charlie and the Chocolate Factory	Tim Burton	Warner Bros. Pictures; The Zanuck Company; Plan B Entertainment; Village Roadshow Pictures	Additional music
2005	An Unfinished Life	Lasse Hallström	Miramax Films; Revolution Studios	—N/a
2005	Mozart and the Whale	Petter Næss	Millennium Films; Nu Image	—N/a
2006	Deep Sea 3D	Howard Hall	Warner Bros. Pictures; IMAX Corporation	Composed with Danny Elfman; IMAX film
2006	Whirlygirl	Jim Wilson	All the Way Round Inc.	—N/a
2006	The Year Without a Santa Claus	Ron Underwood	—N/a	Television film
2006	Charlotte's Web	Gary Winick	Paramount Pictures; Kerner Entertainment Company; Walden Media; Nickelodeon Movies	Additional music
2006	Dreamgirls	Bill Condon	Laurence Mark Productions; DreamWorks Pictures; Paramount Pictures	Additional music
2007	Sydney White	Joe Nussbaum	Universal Pictures; Morgan Creek Productions	—N/a
2007	The Little Traitor	Lynn Roth	Westchester Films Inc.	—N/a
2007	Spider-Man 3	Sam Raimi	Columbia Pictures; Marvel Entertainment; Laura Ziskin Productions	Additional music
2008	Wanted	Timur Bekmambetov	Universal Pictures; Spyglass Entertainment; Relativity Media; Marc Platt Productions; Kickstart Productions; Top Cow Productions	Additional music
2008	Hellboy II: The Golden Army	Guillermo del Toro	Universal Studios; Relativity Media; Lawrence Gordon Productions; Dark Horse Entertainment	Additional music
2008	The Betrayed	Amanda Gusack	Metro-Goldwyn-Mayer	—N/a
2009	Dance Flick	Damien Dante Wayans	Paramount Pictures; MTV Films; Wayans Brothers	Additional music
2009	Spring Breakdown	Ryan Shiraki	Warner Premiere	—N/a
2009	9	Shane Acker; Prod: Tim Burton	Focus Features; Relativity Media; Starz Animation; Tim Burton Productions	Themes by Danny Elfman
2009	More Than a Game	Kristopher Belman	Lionsgate	Additional music
2010	Dear John	Lasse Hallström	Screen Gems; Relativity Media	—N/a
2010	Alice in Wonderland	Tim Burton	Walt Disney Pictures; Roth Films; The Zanuck Company; Team Todd	Additional music
2011	Justin Bieber: Never Say Never	Jon M. Chu	Paramount Pictures; MTV Films; Scooter Braun Films; L.A. Reid Media; AEG Live; Island Def Jam Music Group	—N/a
2011	Prom	Joe Nussbaum	Walt Disney Pictures; Rickshaw Productions	—N/a
2011	Footloose	Craig Brewer	Paramount Pictures; Spyglass Entertainment; MTV Films	—N/a
2012	One for the Money	Julie Anne Robinson	Lionsgate; Lakeshore Entertainment; Sidney Kimmel Entertainment	—N/a
2012	The Dictator	Larry Charles	Paramount Pictures; Four By Two Films	Additional music
2012	Katy Perry: Part of Me	Dan Cutforth; Jane Lipsitz	Paramount Pictures; Nickelodeon Movies; Perry Productions; AEG Live; EMI Music; Columbia Pictures; Imagine Entertainment	—N/a
2012	Fun Size	Josh Schwartz	Paramount Pictures; Nickelodeon Movies; Anonymous Content; Fake Empire	—N/a
2013	Safe Haven	Lasse Hallström	Relativity Media; Temple Hill Entertainment	—N/a
2014	Murder of a Cat	Gillian Greene; Prod: Sam Raimi	Seine Pictures	—N/a
2015	Naomi and Ely's No Kiss List	Kristin Hanggi	Quiver	—N/a
2015	The Astronaut Wives Club	Prod: Stephanie Savage	ABC Studios; Fake Empire; Groundswell Productions	10 episodes
2015	Invisible Sister	Paul Hoen	Disney Channel	Television film
2016	Urban Cowboy	Craig Brewer	20th Century Fox Television	—N/a
2016	The Deal	Daniel S. Kaminsky; Prod: Joss Whedon	Circadian Pictures	Short film
2016	Just Add Magic	Joe Nussbaum	Amazon Studios; Pictures in a Row; Grasshopper Lane Entertainment	Season 1: 13 episodes, with Zack Ryan; Season 2: 26 episodes, with Zack Ryan
2016	Newtown	Kim A. Snyder	—N/a	Additional music
2017	Speech & Debate	Dan Harris	Sycamore Pictures	—N/a
2019	Poms	Zara Hayes	Entertainment One; STX Entertainment	—N/a

=== Arranger/Producer ===
- The SpongeBob Movie: Sponge Out of Water (song arranger)
- Annie (additional arranger)
- Mystic Manor (arranger, music by Danny Elfman)
- Much Ado About Nothing (arranger/producer, score by Joss Whedon)
- Fame (song arranger)
- Bad Santa (song arranger)
- Charlie's Angels: Full Throttle (song arranger)

=== Orchestrations ===
- Men in Black 3 (score by Danny Elfman)
- The X-Files: I Want to Believe (score by Mark Snow)
- The Curse of El Charro (score by Rich Ragsdale)
- X2 (score by John Ottman)
- Urban Legends: Final Cut (score by John Ottman)
- Crazy in Alabama (score by Mark Snow)
- Halloween H20: 20 Years Later (score by John Ottman)
- The X-Files (score by Mark Snow)
- Dexter's Laboratory (add. orch., score by Thomas Chase and Steve Rucker)
- The Day Lincoln Was Shot (score by Mark Snow)
- Barney's Great Adventure (add. orch., score by Van Dyke Parks)

== String Arranger ==
2002

- Gabriel Mann, Tug of War
- The Buzzhorn, Disconnected

2003

- Hoobastank, The Reason
- Adema, Unstable
- Cold, Year of the Spider

2005

- The All-American Rejects, Move Along
- Vendetta Red, Sisters of the Red Death

2006

- Daughtry, Daughtry
- Hoobastank, Every Man for Himself
- Hoobastank, DVD - Live at La Cigale
- Papa Roach, The Paramour Sessions
- Caleb Kane, Go Mad
- Three Days Grace, One-X
- Peter Bradley Adams, Gather Up

2008

- Paul Freeman, You and I
- The All-American Rejects, When the World Comes Down
- Third Day, Revelation
- Theory of a Deadman, Scars & Souvenirs

2009

- Adam Lambert, For Your Entertainment
- All American Rejects, Soundtrack 90210
- Allison Iraheta, Just Like You
- Kelly Clarkson, All I Ever Wanted
- Daughtry, Leave This Town
- Creed, Full Circle
- The Red Jumpsuit Apparatus, Lonely Road
- Katy Perry,Thinking of You live on Ellen and MTV Unplugged
- Halestorm, Halestorm

2010

- Bon Jovi, "What Do You Got?"
- Hawthorne Heights, Skeletons

2011

- 3 Doors Down, Time of My Life
- Theory of a Deadman, The Truth Is...
- Kelly Clarkson, Stronger
- Christina Perri, The Twilight Saga: Breaking Dawn Soundtrack

2013

- Brandi Carlile, Safe Haven Original Motion Picture Soundtrack

2014

- Theory of a Deadman, Savages

2015

- Theory of a Deadman

2016

- Simple Plan, Taking One for the Team
