= Cinema 16: European Short Films =

- Directed by: Various
- Produced by: Luke Morris
- Distributed by: Momac Films/ Warp Films
- Release date: 2007
- Language: English

Cinema16: European Short Films is a DVD featuring European short films. There are two different versions available, one for the UK and European market and a later one for the US market. They are, respectively, the second and fourth in a series of DVDs released by Cinema16.

== Contents of UK edition ==
The UK/European edition contains:

- Talk (Bara Prata Lite) - Lukas Moodysson (13:55)
- Charlotte et Veronique, Ou Tous Les Garcons S'Appellent Patrick - Jean-Luc Godard (19:34)
- Copy Shop - Virgil Widrich (11:36)
- Epilog - Tom Tykwer (12:30)
- Fridge - Peter Mullan (20:05)
- Opening Day of Close-Up - Nanni Moretti (6:48)
- Gisele Kerozene - Jan Kounen (4:26)
- World of Glory (Härlig Är Jorden) - Roy Andersson (15:45)
- L'Homme Sans Tete (The Man Without a Head) - Juan Solanas (17:46)
- Concert of Wishes (Koncert Zyczen) - Krzystof Kieslowski (15:26)
- Jabberwocky - Jan Svankmajer (13:13)
- Nocturne - Lars von Trier (8:28)
- Election Night (Valgaften) - Anders Thomas Jensen (11:02)
- El Secdleto De La Tlompeta - Javier Fesser (17:58)
- Le Batteur Du Boléro - Patrice Leconte (8:02)
- My Wrongs 8245–8249 & 117 - Chris Morris (12:22)

== Contents of US edition ==
- The Man Without a Head- Juan Solanas (France)
- Wasp- Andrea Arnold (United Kingdom)
- Doodlebug- Christopher Nolan (United Kingdom)
- World of Glory - Roy Andersson (Sweden)
- Je T'aime John Wayne - Toby MacDonald (United Kingdom)
- Gasman - Lynne Ramsay (Scotland)
- Jabberwocky - Jan Svankmajer (Czech Republic)
- Fierrot Le Pou - Mathieu Kassovitz (France)
- Rabbit - Run Wrake (United Kingdom)
- Copy Shop - Virgil Widrich (Austria)
- Boy and Bicycle - Ridley Scott (United Kingdom)
- Nocturne - Lars Von Trier (Denmark)
- Before Dawn - Balint Kenyers (Hungary)
- Election Night - Anders Thomas Jensen (Denmark)
- Six Shooter - Martin McDonagh (Ireland)
- The Opening Day of Close-Up - Nanni Moretti (Italy)

The US edition contains short films previously available on the British Short Films and UK/European European Short Films DVDs, plus one that would later appear on the World Short Films DVD. There are also four shorts not on any other Cinema16 release. Those four are Fierrot Le Pou, Rabbit, Before Dawn and Six Shooter.

The other included films are Wasp, Doodlebug, World of Glory, Je T'Aime John Wayne, Gasman, Jabberwocky, Copy Shop, Boy and Bicycle, Nocturne, Election Night, L'Homme Sans Tete (The Man Without a Head), and The Opening Day of Close-Up.

== Reception ==
A DVD File review of the US edition says, "This is an eclectic and engaging collection of short films that might make a hell of an addition to your rental queue."

A DVD Verdict Review, also of the US edition, says, "Except for a tricky menu, any problems with Cinema 16: European Short Films are those inherent in any collection of modern shorts. If you're interested in short films, it's a good place to start."
