= Ode to Freedom =

Ode to Freedom may refer to:

- An die Freiheit ("Ode to Freedom"), purported original phrase in Ode to Joy, lyrics that accompany the final movement of Symphony No. 9 by Beethoven
- The 1989 recording of Symphony no 9. conducted by Leonard Bernstein
- "Ode to Freedom", a song by ABBA on the 2021 album Voyage
- "Ode to Freedom", a conjectured early title of Schiller's poem "Ode to Joy"

== See also ==
- Freiheit (disambiguation)
- Freedom (disambiguation)
- Ode (disambiguation)
- Hymn to Freedom (disambiguation)
- "Hymn to Liberty", an 1823 poem by Dionýsios Solomós
