= Much Ado About Nothing (soundtrack) =

Much Ado About Nothing (Original Soundtrack)

Soundtrack album by Joss Whedon
- Released: June 6, 2013
- Genre: Film score
- Length: 40:41
- Label: Bellwether Records
- Producer: Deborah Lurie

Much Ado About Nothing (Original Soundtrack) is the soundtrack album to the 2012 film Much Ado About Nothing directed and produced by Joss Whedon, who also composed the film score as well. The album featured 32 tracks, including two songs from the William Shakespeare's play. The album was released through Bellwether Records on June 6, 2013, through digital platforms.

== Background ==
Whedon composed the score for the film in his first and only film scoring assignment to date. (Note: Whedon wrote music for the episode "Once More, with Feeling" featured in the sixth season of Buffy the Vampire Slayer) He had chosen to score the film as he could not afford another composer due to monetary constraints. While he found the experience of scoring a film "terrifying", going on to say that "when I'm terrified, I know I'm having fun", he also admitted how music enhanced dialogues in particular scenes. He was further assisted by co-editor and arranger Daniel Kaminsky on working on the score pieces. Deborah Lurie was further enlisted to produce the score. Much of the score was driven through piano and minimal orchestra for quieter and intimate moments. He also arranged music to "Sigh No More" and "Heavily", two songs that William Shakespeare had written into the play. These tracks were performed by Maurissa Tancharoen and Jed Whedon. The score was recorded during March 2013.

== Track listing ==
All tracks are written by Joss Whedon, except where noted.

No.	Title	Writer(s)	Length
1.	"Main Title"		1:12
2.	"Arrival"		0:55
3.	"Hero"		0:49
4.	"If I Had My Mouth"		2:06
5.	"To the Death"		0:42
6.	"Sigh No More" (featuring Maurissa Tancharoen & Jed Whedon)	William Shakespeare	2:36
7.	"Beauty Is a Witch"		1:54
8.	"A Double Heart"		0:41
9.	"Perfectest Herald"		1:07
10.	"The Only Love Gods"		0:38
11.	"Borachio"		2:01
12.	"The Gulling (Part 1)"		0:27
13.	"The Gulling (Part 2)"		1:56
14.	"The Gulling (Part 3)"		1:03
15.	"Love On"		0:52
16.	"Disloyal"		2:46
17.	"A Thousand Ducats"		2:08
18.	"Wedding Day"		0:30
19.	"Madam Withdraw"		0:31
20.	"Wedding March"		0:57
21.	"Left for Dead"		2:14
22.	"Is Not That Strange"		0:43
23.	"I Am Engaged"		2:00
24.	"A Word in Your Ear"		1:39
25.	"How Innocent She Died"		1:10
26.	"Heavily" (featuring Maurissa Tancharoen & Jed Whedon)	William Shakespeare	1:58
27.	"The Balcony"		1:13
28.	"Will You Come"		0:33
29.	"Walk of Shame"		0:36
30.	"Another Hero"		0:50
31.	"A Giddy Thing"		1:10
32.	"Last Dance"		0:44
Total length:			40:41

== Reception ==
Justin Chang of Variety called it a "lightly applied score". Catherine Shoard of The Guardian wrote, "There's a smoky jazz soundtrack, big on bass, sounding for all the world like an extended Seinfeld sting, which helps keep things perky." Dana Stevens of Slate admitted that Whedon's music helped in creating a collective atmosphere on Shakespeare's play, over the individual performances. Christopher Schobert of IndieWire wrote, "the music is a bit daft". Matthew Razak of Flixist wrote, "some of the score sounds like it's from a made-for-TV movie, but even this helps feed into the quick and playful spirit of the film". Alan Zilberman of Tiny Mix Tapes called it "simple but catchy".

== Charts ==
Chart (2013)	Peak position
UK Soundtrack Albums (OCC)	44
US Soundtrack Albums (Billboard)	24

== Credits ==
Credits adapted from liner notes:

- Music composer, conductor and orchestrator: Joss Whedon
- Music producer: Deborah Lurie
- Orchestra contractor: Mark Robertson
- Electronic programming: Michael Mollo
- Recording and mixing: Jeremy Underwood
- Score recordist: Brian R. Taylor
- Music coordinator: Ashley Alexander
- Music editing and supervision: Clint Bennett
- Technical assistance: Miles Bergsma
- Studio technician: Ed Woolley

Instruments

- Bass: Michael Valerio
- Bassoon: Damian Montano
- Cello: Vanessa Freebairn-Smith, David Low
- Piano: Robert Thies
- Viola: Leah Katz, Darrin McCann
- Violin: Samuel Fischer, Rene Mandel, Mark Robertson, Neli Nikolaeva
- Woodwinds: Chris Bleth
