= Gasman (1998 film) =

- Directed by: Lynne Ramsay
- Written by: Lynne Ramsay
- Starring: Lynne Ramsay Jr. Martin Anderson; James Ramsay
- Cinematography: Alwin H. Küchler
- Production company: Holy Cow Films
- Distributed by: Criterion Collection
- Release date: 1998
- Running time: 15 minutes
- Country: United Kingdom
- Language: English

Gasman is a 1998 Scottish short film written and directed by Lynne Ramsay. Set in the 1970s, it stars Ramsay's niece and namesake Lynne Ramsay Jr. as Lynne, a young girl who discovers her father's not-so-secret infidelity at a Christmas party. The film is filmed and set in Glasgow. Gasman received critical attention and premiered at the 1998 Cannes Film Festival where it received the Short Film Palme d'Or. It also received the BAFTA Award for Best Short Film nomination.

It is available on the Cinema 16: British Short Films and Cinema 16: European Short Films (US Special Edition) DVDs, and as a bonus feature on the Ratcatcher DVD in the UK and the US.

== Plot ==
Set in the 1970s, it stars Ramsay's niece and namesake Lynne Ramsay Jr. as Lynne, a young girl who discovers her father's not-so-secret infidelity at a Christmas party. The film is filmed and set in Glasgow.

== Cast ==
- Lynne Ramsay Jr. as Lynne
- Martin Anderson as Steven
- James Ramsay as Da
- Denise Flannagan as Ma
- Jackie Quinn as Woman
- Lisa Taylor as Girl
- Robert McEwan as Boy

== Release ==
- The film is available on the Cinema 16: British Short Films and Cinema 16: European Short Films (US Special Edition) DVDs
- This short film is featured on the Criterion Collection DVD for Ratcatcher (1999).

== Awards and nominations ==
Year	Award	Category	Nominee	Result	Ref.
1998	Cannes Film Festival	Short Film Palme d'Or	Lynne Ramsay	Won	
1998	British Academy Film Awards	Best Short Film	Lynne Ramsay & Gavin Emerson	Nominated	
1998	Chicago International Film Festival	Best Narrative Short Film	Lynne Ramsay	Won	
1998	Locarno International Film Festival	Best Film	Lynne Ramsay	Won	
1998	Atlantic Film Festival	Best International Short Film	Lynne Ramsay	Won	
