= Hymn to Freedom =

Hymn to Freedom may refer to:

- "Hymn to Liberty", the national anthem of Greece and Cyprus
- "Hymn to Freedom" (Oscar Peterson song), a song by Oscar Peterson from the 1962 album Night Train

== See also ==
- Ode to Freedom (disambiguation)
