= George Lucas in Love =

- Film poster
- Directed by: Joe Nussbaum
- Written by: Joe Nussbaum; Daniel Shere
- Story by: Joe Nussbaum; Timothy Dowling
- Produced by: Joseph Levy
- Starring: Martin Hynes; Lisa Jakub
- Cinematography: Eric J. Haase
- Edited by: Ryan Gold
- Music by: Deborah Lurie
- Distributed by: MediaTrip.com
- Release date: June 1999
- Running time: 8 minutes
- Country: United States
- Language: English

George Lucas in Love is a 1999 American parodical short film directed by Joe Nussbaum. A parody of Shakespeare in Love, it depicts a young George Lucas and his real-life inspirations behind the characters and plot of Star Wars. Upon its release, the film was widely passed around Hollywood offices and served as Nussbaum’s break into the film industry. Lucas himself reacted to the film positively.

== Plot ==
In the film, George Lucas (Martin Hynes) is a 1967 USC college student, suffering from writer's block as he attempts to write a movie about a young space farmer with a bad crop of "space wheat". Taking a break from his work, George goes on to encounter classmates and teachers who resemble and will influence the eventual creation of, Obi-Wan Kenobi, Darth Vader, Han Solo, Chewbacca, Jabba the Hutt, R2-D2, and C-3PO. Lucas is surrounded by inspiration, but he sees nothing. Even his wise advisor (Patrick Kerr), who suspiciously looks and speaks like Yoda, is unable to help him.

Eventually, young Lucas meets his muse, a young woman (with a very unusual hairdo) named Marion (Lisa Jakub) who is "kind of leading a student rebellion". After they meet, everything falls into place for Lucas, as she urges him to "write what you know". His writer's block dissipates and he quickly finishes his masterpiece. However, his shot at romance with the girl is blown when he discovers she's his sister.

In a post-credits scene, Lucas gets a new idea when his neighbor introduces Lucas to his new pet, a duck named Howard.

== Reception ==
The film received great attention as it circulated around Hollywood in the summer of 1999 and eventually premiered at the Toronto International Film Festival on September 19 that year. It debuted online at MediaTrip.com on October 12, 1999. The film won several awards, including the Canal+ Short Film Award at the 2000 Deauville American Film Festival, the Audience Award at both the Florida Film Festival and the San Sebastián Horror and Fantasy Film Festival and Best Short Film at the 2000 U.S. Comedy Arts Festival.

When the film was released on VHS in 2000, The New York Times reported that the film made it to #1 on Amazon.com's Top 10 sales chart, beating out sales of Star Wars: Episode I – The Phantom Menace for at least a day. A DVD with audio commentary by the director and producer, a behind-the-scenes featurette and several other MediaTrip short films, including Evil Hill, Film Club and Swing Blade, was released in 2001; George Lucas in Love itself is also included in Cinema16's DVD of American Short Films, released in the United Kingdom in 2006.

Nussbaum would later direct the films Sleepover, American Pie Presents: The Naked Mile and Sydney White starring Amanda Bynes.

In 2004, the film won the Pioneer Award in the Lucasfilm-sponsored 2004 Official Star Wars Fan Film Awards.

George Lucas is a fan of this movie, having sent a congratulatory letter to the filmmakers, which they show in a hidden Easter egg on the DVD.

== See also ==
- Star Wars sources and analogues, a more serious take on the subject.
