= Vincent (1982 film) =

- Title screen
- Directed by: Tim Burton
- Written by: Tim Burton
- Produced by: Rick Heinrichs
- Narrated by: Vincent Price
- Cinematography: Victor Abdalov
- Music by: Ken Hilton
- Production company: Walt Disney Productions
- Distributed by: Buena Vista Distribution
- Release date: October 1, 1982 (United States)
- Running time: 6 minutes
- Country: United States
- Language: English
- Budget: $60,000

Vincent is a 1982 American gothic stop-motion animated short film written, designed and directed by Tim Burton, and produced by Rick Heinrichs.

The film is narrated by actor Vincent Price, a lifelong idol of and inspiration for Burton. From this relationship, Price would go on to appear in Burton's Edward Scissorhands. Vincent Price later said that Vincent was "the most gratifying thing that ever happened. It was immortality — better than a star on Hollywood Boulevard."

There is currently no individual release of the film except for a few bootleg releases. It can be found on the 2008 Special Edition and Collector's Edition DVDs of The Nightmare Before Christmas as a bonus feature and on the Cinema16 DVD American Short Films.

== Plot ==
Vincent is the story, told in rhyming verse, of a 7-year-old boy, Vincent Malloy, who pretends to be like the actor Vincent Price (who narrates the film). He does experiments on his dog Abercrombie in order to create a horrible ravenous zombie dog. He is obsessed with the tales of Edgar Allan Poe, and it is his detachment from reality when reading them that leads to him seeing himself as a tortured artist and mad scientist, deprived of the woman he loves, mirroring certain parts of Poe's "The Raven". His mother dismisses his delusions and tells him to go outside and have "some real fun", to no avail. The film ends with Vincent feeling terrified of being tortured by the going-ons of his make-believe world, quoting "The Raven" as he falls to the floor in frailty, believing himself to be dead.

== Production and release ==
While working as a conceptual artist at Walt Disney Productions, Tim Burton found himself two allies in Disney executive Julie Hickson, and Head of Creative Development Tom Wilhite. The two were impressed with Burton's unique talents and, while they felt he was not "Disney material", they still thought he deserved respect. In 1982, Wilhite gave Burton $60,000 to produce an adaptation of a poem Burton had written titled Vincent. Burton had originally planned the poem to be a children's short story book but thought otherwise.

Together with fellow Disney animator Rick Heinrichs, stop motion animator Stephen Chiodo and cameraman Victor Abdalov, Burton worked on the project for two months and came up with the six-minute short film. Shot in stark black-and-white in the style of the German Expressionist films of the 1920s, Vincent imagines himself in a series of situations inspired by the Vincent Price/Edgar Allan Poe films that had such an effect on Burton as a child, including experimenting on his dog — a theme that would subsequently appear in Frankenweenie — and welcoming his aunt home while simultaneously conjuring up the image of her dipped in hot wax. Vincent Malloy, the main character in the film, bears a striking resemblance to Tim Burton himself.

The film was narrated by Burton's childhood idol, Vincent Price, and marked the beginning of a friendship between them that lasted until Price's death in 1993. Burton credits the experience as one of the most formative experiences of his life.

The film was theatrically released for two weeks in one Los Angeles cinema with the teen drama Tex. Before it was consigned to the Disney vaults, it garnered several critical accolades when it played at film festivals in London, Chicago and Seattle, winning two awards at Chicago and the Critics' Prize at the Annecy Film Festival in France.

The short was planned to be converted to 3D and shown with the 2007 3D re-release of "The Nightmare Before Christmas", this conversion was abandoned due to production issues.

== Cameos ==
An early form of the character of Jack Skellington from The Nightmare Before Christmas can be seen in the upper-left corner of the screen from 1:18–1:25 as well as in front of the embodiment of his deceased wife from 4:45–4:47. Jack also appeared in Tim Burton's Beetlejuice and the stop-motion animation film James and the Giant Peach. The first two cameos were years before production of Nightmare, though Burton had toyed with the original story idea while still an animator at Disney.

The character Prince Vince, from the Beetlejuice animated cartoon which would premiere seven years later, is named after and bears a strong resemblance to Vincent Malloy, both in appearance and mannerisms.
