= Star Wars sources and analogues =

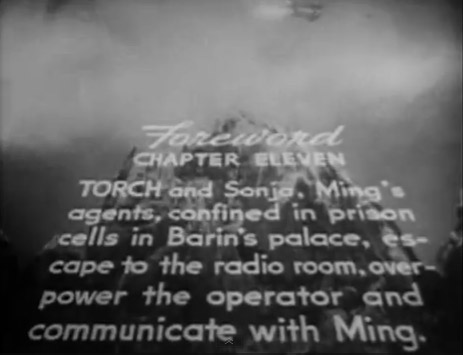
Flash Gordon serials featured an opening 'crawl' like those used in Star Wars.

The Star Wars space fantasy media franchise is acknowledged to have been inspired by multiple sources. These include Islam, Catholicism, Hinduism, Buddhism, Qigong, philosophy, classical mythology, Roman history, Gnosticism, Zoroastrianism, parts of the other Abrahamic religions, Confucianism, Shintō and Taoism, and countless cinematic precursors. Creator George Lucas stated "Most of the spiritual reality in the movie[s] is based on a synthesis of all religions. A synthesis through history; the way man has perceived the unknown and the great mystery and tried to deal with that or dealing with it".

Lucas has also said that chivalry, knighthood, paladinism and related institutions in feudal societies inspired some concepts in the Star Wars films, most notably the Jedi Knights. The work of the mythologist Joseph Campbell, especially his book The Hero with a Thousand Faces, directly influenced Lucas, and is what drove him to create the "modern myth" of Star Wars. The natural flow of energy known as the Force is believed to have originated from the concept of qi/chi/ki, "the all-pervading vital energy of the universe".

To celebrate the 30th anniversary of Star Wars, The History Channel premiered a two-hour event covering the entire Star Wars saga entitled Star Wars: The Legacy Revealed. Featuring interviews from the likes of Stephen Colbert, Newt Gingrich, Nancy Pelosi, Tom Brokaw, Dan Rather, Peter Jackson, acclaimed scholars and others, the program delved further into the Heroic Epic concept and the influences of mythology and other motifs that were important in making Star Wars. Subjects include sins of the father and redeeming the father, coming of age, exiting the ordinary world and others.

== Fictional works similarities and inspirations ==
=== Literature ===
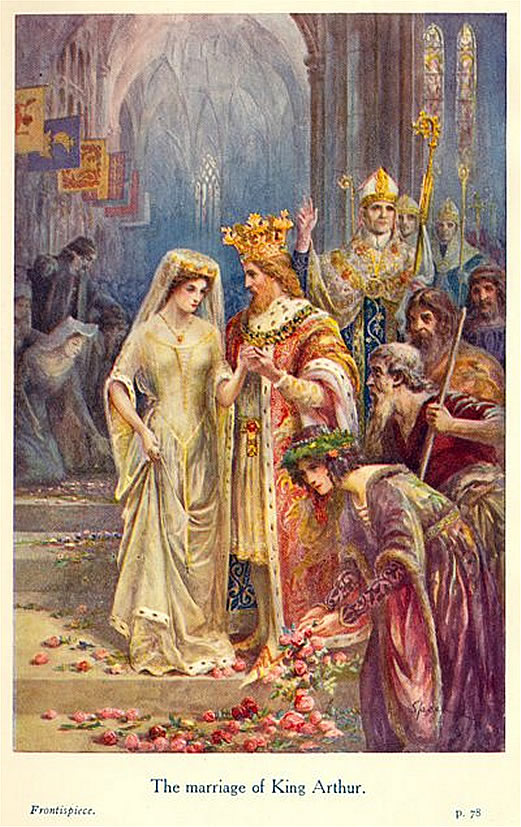
The legendary King Arthur (illustrated in the center) has a significant parallel to Luke Skywalker as a young orphaned hero embarking on a journey to restore peace and justice to his society. Arthur's use of his sword Excalibur as a tool of achieving objectives is reflected by Luke's use of his lightsaber in the same manner.

- Joseph Campbell's comparative mythology book The Hero with a Thousand Faces, directly influenced Lucas, and is what drove him to create the "modern myth" of Star Wars.
- E.E. 'Doc' Smith's writings contain elements central to the Star Wars universe. These elements include:
  - Spherical, moon-sized spaceships.
  - Smaller, spherical, jet-less fighters with accumulators for beamed power.
  - Spacehounds of IPC includes light swords of slicing "blade of flame" and "planes of force" wielded by spherical ships, also attested in melee combat.
  - Smith's Lensmen have the telepathic powers of the Jedi derived from crystalline lenses mirroring Kyber crystals in Star Wars.
  - In Triplanetary, a "tractor beam" from an artificial planetoid captures another vessel and a damsel in distress adventure ensues.
  - Space armor with a general focus on melee combat using space axes.
  - Norlaminian worship of "the all-controlling Force" along with general use of "force" powers throughout.
  - A Golden Meteor is the emblem and insignia of the galactic protectors.
  - A galactic trade in drugs which are used as currency: Thionite in Smith, Spice in Star Wars.
  - A galactic corps of heroes with telepathic powers. (Note: Lensman was written 10 years before the Silver Age edition of Green Lantern)
  - Benevolent guardians seeking to fight evil. (Called Arisians in Lensman; Aquillian in the second draft script for Star Wars.)
  - A dark, unseen enemy seeking galactic domination. (Called Boskone in Lensman; Bogan in the second draft script for Star Wars.)
  - Special powers running down through family lines, with twins playing a significant role.
  - Epic space battles involving fleets of ships.
  - Large-scale weapons including a free-roaming planet-sized fortress and the sunbeam (capable of focusing the sun's rays, similar to Starkiller Base in The Force Awakens).
  - Jettisoning a space lifeboat with a data spool containing secrets of the enemy's ultimate weapon, the 'Grand Base'.
  - Training with a helmet with a blast shield, yet able to 'see' due to special powers.
  - Passing a ship off as a chunk of loose metal.
  - Numerous uses of the word coruscant, a term which had declined in use after the 19th century.
- The science fiction writer Isaac Asimov stated on several occasions that George Lucas's galaxy-wide Empire bore a close resemblance to the galaxy depicted in Asimov's Foundation Series. The greatest differences are that Asimov's Galaxy contains almost no robots and no non-human aliens. Asimov addressed both issues directly in the saga's later volumes, most notably Foundation's Edge and Foundation and Earth. Since Asimov's death in 1992, the Star Wars cinematic universe has gained new Asimovesque elements: The Phantom Menace introduced the planet Coruscant, which bears a close resemblance to Asimov's Trantor.
- The early Journal of the Whills draft of Star Wars from 1973 is based on the first chapter of the 1931 John Carter novel A Fighting Man of Mars by Edgar Rice Burroughs.
- Star Wars borrows significantly from Arthurian mythology; especially with respect to plot and main character development. The life and character development of Luke Skywalker resembles that of the legendary King Arthur. Both are orphans who later become heroes in their early adulthood. Both also have mentors who are much older and provide them with guidance and/or training. Arthur was mentored by Merlin; whereas Luke was mentored and trained by Obi-Wan Kenobi prior to continuing his training and mentorship with Yoda. The role of Anakin Skywalker as the father of the hero, Luke Skywalker, mirrors that of Uther Pendragon who is King Arthur's father. Qui Gon-Jinn, Master Yoda and Obi-Wan Kenobi's roles match that of Merlin during the era of Anakin Skywalker and Uther Pendragon respectively.
- Star Wars shares a number of similarities with Frank Herbert's Dune, including the desert planet setting with a moisture-based economy, spice smugglers, obese interstellar antagonists, and a mystical mind control-using sect with great influence over galactic politics — Herbert himself once enumerated 37 similarities. The influence was even more distinct in early Star Wars versions, with Princess Leia guarding a shipment of "aura spice" instead of the Death Star plans. The script for Jodorowsky's Dune was circulating in Hollywood at the time of Lucas' early work on Star Wars. The director of the 2021 film adaptation of Dune, Denis Villeneuve, said the new film would attempt to be Star Wars for adults.
- The day after The Phantom Menace came out in theaters, a number of fans and some journalists had already noticed that there were similarities between the city of Theed on Naboo and some settings in the fantasy book series Dinotopia. Specifically, Waterfall City, the Dinosaur Parade, and some of the submarine sequences. The creator of Dinotopia, James Gurney, stated on his website that he had no involvement and was in contact with George Lucas. Gurney stated in an interview that George Lucas was brought in by Columbia Pictures to see if he'd be interested in working on a film based on Gurney's books during its developmental phase because Gurney believed Lucas's Industrial Light & Magic could get the settings right. However, negotiations broke down and Lucas refused to do the movie. One storyboard artist who worked on Lucas's movie also did some work on the Dinotopia project. Gurney stated that Lucas called him the day after the movie was released in theaters and told Gurney that he was worried he might be afraid of the similarities. Gurney said that he was flattered that Lucas would be inspired by his work, and was only worried people might think his work was a rip-off of Star Wars. Lucas also said he reads the Dinotopia books to his kids.

==== Pulp heroes and comics ====
- Buck Rogers, another hero from pulp magazines from 1920s, and late comic strips (1929–67) and later a 1939 film serial and a 1950–51 TV series. Star Wars is also influenced from its tropes.

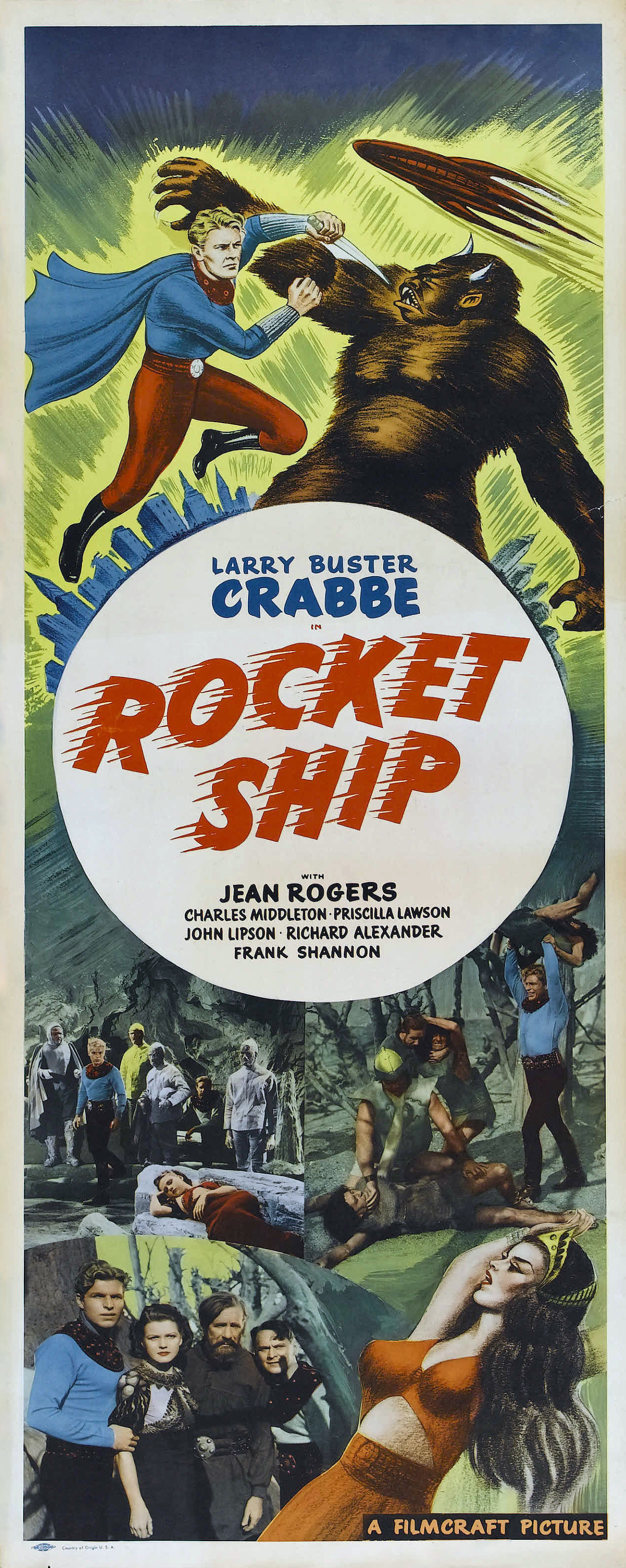
The classic science fiction film serial Flash Gordon served as an inspiration for Star Wars.

- Flash Gordon is the pulp hero whose original property George Lucas had sought to license before making the first Star Wars film, A New Hope; the film includes multiple elements derived from the 1936 Universal serial Flash Gordon and its sequel, Flash Gordon Conquers the Universe. The basic plot involving the infiltration of a megalomaniacal outer-space Emperor's fortress by two heroes disguised in uniforms of soldiers of his army is drawn from Flash Gordon Conquers the Universe, with Luke Skywalker and Han Solo filling the roles of Flash Gordon and Prince Barin, respectively, and Ming the Merciless the Emperor. The Emperor's deadly, hostile planet (the Death Star/Mongo), a sometimes scantily-clad brunette space Princess whom the hero defends (Princess Leia/Princess Aura), a big, strong, hairy, animal-like ally (Chewbacca/Prince Thun of the Lion Men), a fearsome monster found underground and/or fought in an arena by the hero (the Rancor/the Gocko or Orangopoid), a city in the sky ruled by someone who originally works with the villains but later joins the heroes (Lando Calrissian of Cloud City), ray-guns, and dogfighting spaceships were all elements retained from the first Universal Flash Gordon serial. The opening text crawl of Star Wars is in the same style as the text openings of each chapter of the Flash Gordon Conquers The Universe serial. [From the 1940 series, not 1936, and the opening crawl is from the 1938 film Boys' School].
- DC Comics and Jack Kirby. There has been a long debate among fans about the influence that comic book writer Jack Kirby had on the original Star Wars trilogy. Kirby's time at DC Comics between 1971 and 1975 was defined by his creation of the New Gods saga. This intergalactic story involved Orion of the planet New Genesis being prophesied by the Source as the warrior to defeat Darkseid - the tyrannical ruler of the planet Apokolips, and, by doing so, bring peace to the universe and end the conflict between the two planets. Parallels can thus be drawn between the nature of the relationships between Orion and Darkseid to Luke Skywalker and Darth Vader, as well as between the mythical Source and the Force. According to some accounts, Lucas met comic book writer and editor Roy Thomas at a dinner in 1972, during which Lucas described the plot of Star Wars, to which Thomas noticed the similarity between this and Kirby's New Gods, which was then already a published series.
- Marvel Comics: Lucas original trilogy co-writer Lawrence Kasdan noted that the spin-offs were expanding the franchise into more of a shared universe. Far beyond the previously linear saga, adding that one of the strengths of the franchise was how it all fell under the same continuity in comparison to other franchises. Kasdan also contrasted Star Wars to the Marvel Cinematic Universe, noting that Star Wars features less comedy than the latter, and adding that he felt a more comedic approach like Marvel's Guardians of the Galaxy would "not be Star Wars" to him.
  - Jon Favreau stated that he took what he learned from doing the Marvel adjacent Iron Man films into doing The Mandalorian and The Book of Boba Fett in the Star Wars franchise. All there characters rely on metallic, high-tech armors that can fly and fire weapons.

==== J. R. R. Tolkien's The Hobbit and The Lord of the Rings ====
Chris Taylor's comparison of Star Wars with The Lord of the Rings
Element	Star Wars 1977	The Lord of the Rings 1954–55
Wise old man	Obi-Wan Kenobi sacrifices himself fighting Darth Vader, then guides Luke through the Force	Gandalf dies saving Fellowship from the Balrog, then guides Frodo telepathically
Innocent protagonists	R2-D2 and C-3PO, carrying stolen data tapes, supported by the team	Frodo and Sam, carrying the One Ring, supported by the Fellowship
"Hellish war machine"	Death Star	Mordor
Enemy troops	Stormtroopers	Orcs
Evil wizard	Grand Moff Tarkin	Saruman
Dark Lord	Darth Vader	Sauron

J. R. R. Tolkien's 1937 The Hobbit and 1954–55 The Lord of the Rings novels inspired George Lucas's creation of Star Wars in 1977. An early draft for the 1977 Star Wars film is said to have included an exchange of dialogue between Obi-Wan Kenobi and Luke Skywalker taken directly from the conversation between Gandalf and Bilbo in Chapter 1 of The Hobbit, where Bilbo/Luke says "Good morning!" and Gandalf/Kenobi replies asking whether he means he's having a good morning, or is wishing him one, or that all mornings are good. Bilbo/Luke answers "All of them at once". The plagiarised dialogue was dropped, but the monk-like Kenobi was modelled on Gandalf; the film author Chris Taylor identifies several further elements of Star Wars that in his view could have been modelled on Middle-earth.

While doing a Star Wars animated series, Dave Filoni noted that Peter Jackson visited him and his mentor George Lucas to discuss Tolkien's works and to ask for advice. According to the Star Wars website, Darth Vader is compared by Filoni to the Balrog rather than Sauron, and the Prancing Pony bar may have inspired the Mos Eisley cantina, with the introduction of Han Solo suggestively matching that of Strider (Aragorn). As for the prequel trilogy, it notes that Saruman influenced Count Dooku (both are portrayed by Christopher Lee in the respective films), and volcanic Mordor, whether Tolkien's or Jackson's, influenced the volcanic planet Mustafar.

George R. R. Martin acknowledged Tolkien influenced his Game of Thrones TV series and novels about medieval fantasy, while speaking about a film about Tolkien's life. Jon Favreau mentioned Game of Thrones as an influence on The Mandalorian's second season. Martin's A Song of Ice and Fire / Game of Thrones (1996 – present) has been compared to Star Wars. This is most commonly through the characters of Luke Skywalker and Jaime Lannister, due to both being sword-fighters who lose their hands in duels, while being knights sworn to celibacy, and also due to their incestuous relationships to their respective sisters, Leia and Cersei (though Luke and Leia were unaware of being siblings, and the Lannisters have children). Both feature mothers who died at child-birth (A Game of Thrones was written before the release of Revenge of the Sith), and arguably evil fathers (though Luke and Leia weren't raised by him). Captain Phasma has also been compared as weaker than Brienne of Tharth, due to both sharing the same actress. A number of people were in both franchises. Both franchises feature important fights on throne rooms, with Emperor Palpatine's throne being compared to the Iron Throne, though Martin's works are far more violent.

=== Opera ===
- Star Wars is widely considered to resemble Richard Wagner's Der Ring des Nibelungen in themes, plot elements, and music.

=== Film and television ===
- Lucas has specifically cited the fact that he became acquainted with the term jidaigeki ("period drama", the Japanese genre of samurai films) while in Japan, and it is widely assumed that he took inspiration for the term Jedi from this.
- The costume for Darth Vader was visually inspired by the character "The Lightning" in the Republic Pictures serial The Fighting Devil Dogs. The Lightning also had an army of white-armored stormtroopers and flew through the sky in a large triangular airship (the "flying wing").
- Darth Vader's need to wear his helmet to breathe recalls the oxygen helmets of the underground-dwelling Muranians in the 1935 Mascot serial The Phantom Empire, which are required by the caped Thunder Riders to be able to breathe on the surface.
- The Phantom Menace features a pod racing action sequence. This entire sequence is inspired by the famous chariot race of Ben Hur. The climactic moment when Sebulba's Pod attaches itself to Anakin's Pod mimics, almost shot for shot, the climactic moment of the scene in Ben Hur when Messala accidentally locks wheels with Ben Hur. Lines, scenes and themes from Ben-Hur had already previously influenced the Star Wars films. The conflict between the Rebel Alliance and the Empire is comparable to the earlier film's depiction of the historical Roman-Jewish conflict of the time, with an ascendant Roman Empire, represented by Messala, threatening to wipe out the Jewish rebels and send them extinct. The same Chariot sequence also inspired parts of the Endor speeder chase in Return of the Jedi, which also includes a sequence where two speeders accidentally interlock. The film's famous early line "The Emperor is displeased, he wishes Judea be made into a more obedient province!" significantly influenced dialogue in all Original Trilogy Star Wars films, with the first four words, in particular, is frequently directly quoted in relation to Star Wars Emperor Palpatine character.
- Lucas has also cited John Ford's The Searchers and David Lean's Lawrence of Arabia as references for the style—if not the story—used in the films. A more direct homage to Lawrence of Arabia occurs in Attack of the Clones, as Padme and Anakin talk while walking around the Theed palace on Naboo. It was filmed at the Plaza de España in Seville, Spain, which in Lawrence of Arabia was the site of the British Army headquarters in Cairo, and was shot in an exact manner as the scene in Lawrence of Arabia where Allenby (Jack Hawkins) and Dryden (Claude Rains) discuss whether to give artillery to Lawrence's Arab troops. In the same film, Padme and Anakin also retreat to an estate called Varykino – the name of the Gromeko family estate in Doctor Zhivago. (Some also have considered Tom Courtenay's Pasha/Strelnikov character from Zhivago as an inspiration for Anakin/Darth Vader, but the similarities are likely coincidental.) Similarly, the chase sequence with Zam Wesell on Coruscant likely references Blade Runner; Lucas based a number of the Coruscant cityscapes on Los Angeles in 2019. A reference to The Searchers occurs in Star Wars, when Luke discovers the burning moisture farm, while the Tusken Raiders sequence in Attack of the Clones recalls the climax of The Searchers. Han's showdown with Greedo in Star Wars resembles a scene in another John Ford film, Cheyenne Autumn.
- Lucas is also a fan of Sergio Leone's film Once Upon a Time in the West, and according to Leone's biographer, Christopher Frayling, he listened to the score from Leone's film while editing The Empire Strikes Back. Some have considered Vader's first appearance in A New Hope as being an "homage" to the introduction of Henry Fonda's villainous Frank in the Leone film.
- The death scene of Yoda in Return of the Jedi is taken almost shot-for-shot from the death scene of the similarly mystical High Lama in Frank Capra's Lost Horizon (Yoda and the High Lama also both share a diminutive form and odd cadence of speech).
- The attack on the Death Star in the climax of the film A New Hope is similar in multiple respects to the strategy of Operation Chastise from the 1954 British film, The Dam Busters. Rebel pilots have to fly through a trench while evading enemy fire and drop a single special weapon at a precise distance from the target to destroy the entire base with a single explosion; if one run fails another run must be made by a different pilot. Some scenes from the A New Hope climax are similar to those in The Dam Busters and some of the dialogue is nearly identical in the two films. These scenes are also heavily influenced by the action scenes from the fictional wartime film 633 Squadron. That film's finale shows the squadron's planes flying down a deep fjord while being fired at along the way by anti-aircraft guns lining its sides. George Lucas has stated in interviews that this sequence inspired the 'trench run' sequence in Star Wars.
- Francis Ford Coppola – Lucas based the friendship between Luke Skywalker and Han Solo on his own friendship with Francis Ford Coppola. In Revenge of the Sith, during Anakin's massacre on Mustafar, the slaughter of the Separatist Council and the declaration of the Galactic Empire are reminiscent of the montage of massacres during the christening scene of The Godfather, a film directed by Coppola. They are similar in that the christening of one (the baby and the Empire) with the death of a group of others (the other dons and the Separatists). Post-Lucas director Rian Johnson inspired one of the final shots of The Last Jedi where the Millennium Falcon door closes, on the final scene of The Godfather where a door closes on Michael Corleone. While, Lucas wanted the sequel trilogy Luke Skywalker inspired on the cynic Colonel Kurtz from Coppolla's "Apocalypse Now".
- The Maschinenmensch – the robot in Fritz Lang's 1927 film Metropolis – inspired the look of C-3PO, although the Maschinenmensch is a gynoid whereas C-3PO has masculine programming.
- Ray Harryhausen used stop motion animation to create a mechanical owl, Bubo, in Clash of the Titans (1981). Despite Bubo's similarities (Bubo is metallic and expresses by whistling and rotating its head) to the droid R2-D2 of the 1977 film Star Wars, Harryhausen claimed Bubo was created before Star Wars was released.
- Lucas used the term the Force to "echo" its use by cinematographer Roman Kroitor in 21-87 (1963), in which Kroitor says, "Many people feel that in the contemplation of nature and in communication with other living things, they become aware of some kind of force, or something, behind this apparent mask which we see in front of us, and they call it God". Although Lucas had Kroitor's line in mind specifically, Lucas said the underlying sentiment is universal and that "similar phrases have been used extensively by many different people for the last 13,000 years".

==== Akira Kurosawa ====
Akira Kurosawa films:

- The Hidden Fortress (1958) – A New Hope features the exploits of C-3PO and R2-D2, whereas the plot of The Hidden Fortress is told from the point of view of two bickering peasants. The two peasants, Tahei and Matashichi, are first shown escaping a battle, while C-3PO and R2-D2 are first shown fleeing an attack in A New Hope. Additionally, both films feature a battle-tested General – Rokurota Makabe in The Hidden Fortress and Obi-Wan Kenobi in A New Hope – who assist a rebellion led by a princess and engage in a duel with a former rival whom they fought years earlier. Lucas also features multiple horizontal wipe scene transitions in Star Wars, a technique used thoroughly by Kurosawa in his films. Similarly, the Princess trades places with a slave girl in The Hidden Fortress, with the slave girl acting as a decoy for the real Princess. In The Phantom Menace, Queen Amidala trades places with one of her handmaidens who acts as a decoy.
- Yojimbo (1961) inspired the brawl scene in the Cantina. Its sequel Sanjuro (1962) inspired the hiding-under-the-floor trick.
  - "A Fistful of Dollars" which is Sergio Leone's first film in Dollars trilogy, is an unofficial remake of the Kurosawa film "Yojimbo", that also inspired George Lucas. Clint Eastwood's cowboy character without a name, also inspired the post-Lucas created main character of The Mandalorian, and also the Lucas created character Cad Bane from The Clone Wars animated series. (Though the episode "Hostage Crisis" that introduced Cad Bane, has the character also inspired on Hans Gruber, the villain of Die Hard, with its plot also being a loose remake of the Bruce Willis film).
    - Django another unofficial western remake of Yojimbo, inspired Lucas on the name of his character Jango Fett.
- Dersu Uzala (1975), just two years before the first Star Wars film, there are two scenes that bear a striking resemblance to scenes in Star Wars. The first is the Captain and Dersu looking out over the horizon, seeing both the setting sun and the rising moon at the same time. This is much like when Luke Skywalker stares out on the sky with binary suns in A New Hope. The other scene is when Dersu and the Captain are suddenly caught in a blizzard, and they have to quickly build a shelter to spend the night, to survive the cold. The Captain collapses from the cold and Dersu has to drag and stuff him into the shelter. This is similar to the scene in The Empire Strikes Back where Han Solo cuts a tauntaun open with Luke's lightsaber and stuffs the unconscious Luke into it, when they get caught in a blizzard on the snow planet Hoth. A similar moment using a horse, happens in The Revenant (2015), than won an Oscar to Leonardo DiCaprio for playing 1700s frontier man Hugh Glass.
- Rashomon (1950): On The Last Jedi (2017), from post-George Lucas director Rian Johnson. The Rashomon effect, is described on the part where Rey is told by Luke, a description of how he considered murdering his nephew Ben Solo in his sleep, due to feeling his inevitable fall to the dark side of The Force. Then Solo, who by that point had renamed himself as Kylo Ren, tells his perspective, which causes Luke to tell a third perspective of the event. All whom cause a reinterpretation of a similar event in Return of the Jedi.
- Seven Samurai also inspired an episode of The Clone Wars animated series, and the first Star Wars comic with an original plot, that wasn't adapted from the film. The Mandalorian released its "Chapter 4: Sanctuary" has also been compared to Seven Samurai.

==== Star Trek ====
George Lucas claims he became a fan of Star Trek when the original series broadcast in the late 1960s which played an influence on the development of Star Wars in 1977. Lucas claimed he also visited Star Trek conventions. The filmmaker amazed Clint Howard by, during an audition, immediately citing his role 15 years earlier as Balok from "The Corbomite Maneuver". Howard said that he wanted to yell "Get a life" at the filmmaker.

==== The original films' influence on the franchise after Disney buys Lucasfilm ====
Following the sale of Lucasfilm to Disney, and the release of the 2015 film Star Wars: The Force Awakens, a Whatculture.com writer noticed the film bore multiple parallels and similar plot beats to A New Hope. McGill University computer science professor Derek Ruths ran an algorithm that found that, while it was not a one to one translation (for instance, Rey and Kylo Ren did not mirror Luke Skywalker and Darth Vader), the script mirrored A New Hope a lot in the way that each film's characters were grouped.

== Real world history ==
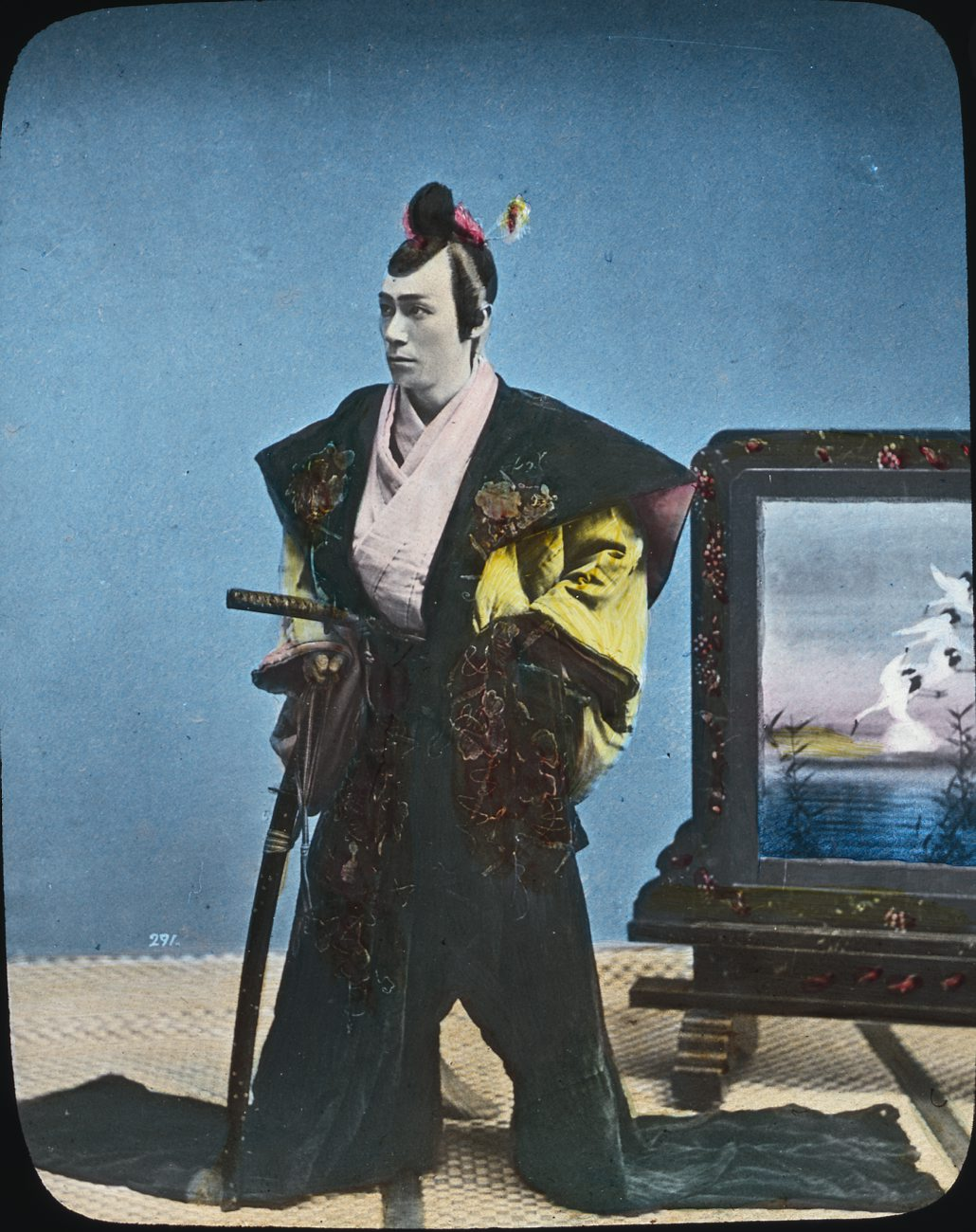
The Samurai, nobility and officer caste of medieval and early-modern Japan are a strong influence on the concept of the Jedi as sword fighting martial artist warriors who served as guardians of society.

=== Ancient and medieval history ===
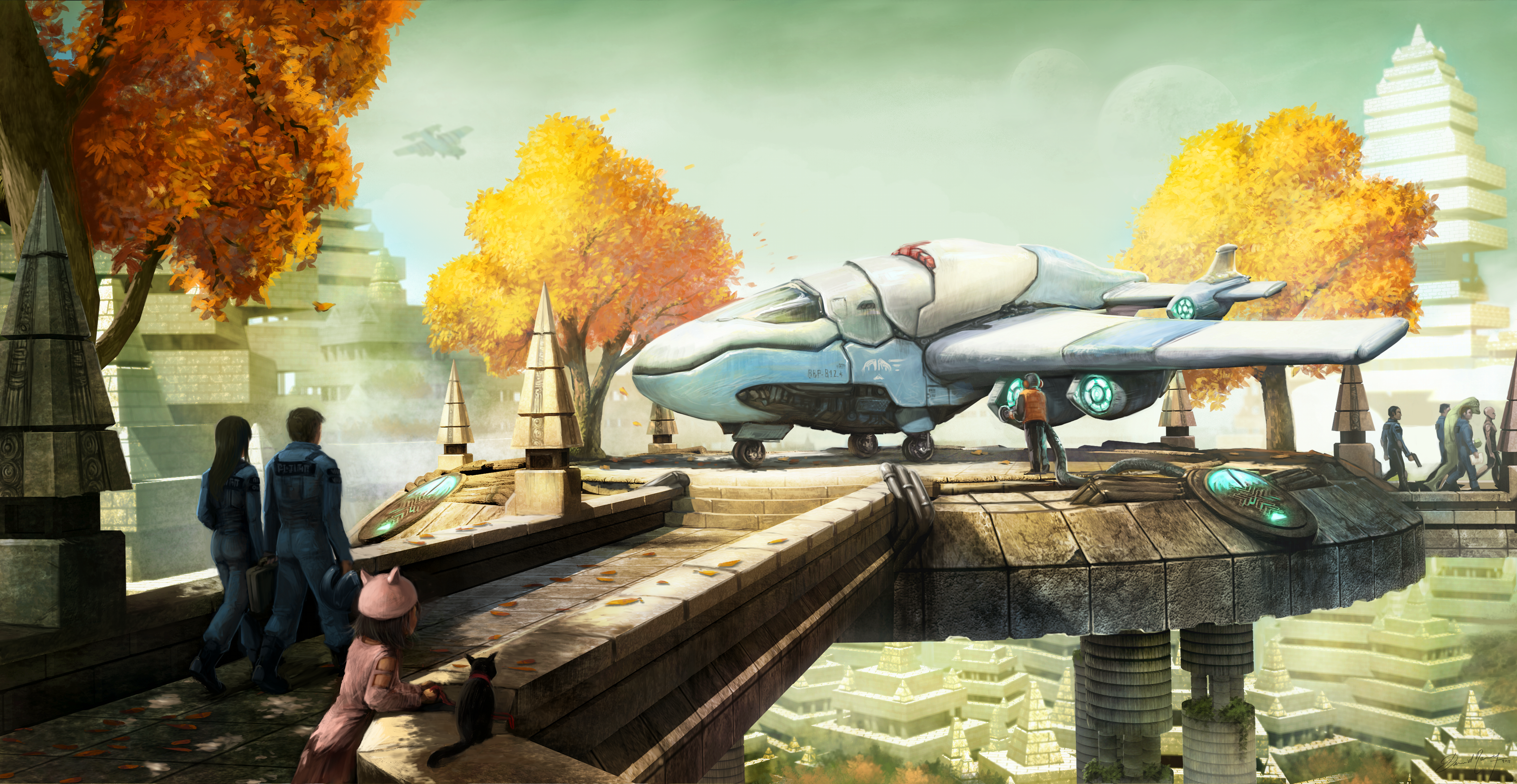
A depiction of a science fictional civilization living a medieval Earth-like existence; a concept that Star Wars is a major example of.

- Ancient and medieval history play amongst the strongest and significant influences on Star Wars which reflects ancient Earth history in its settings, including architectural, social and hierarchical structures (i.e. the existence of monarchies and empires) as well as story lines which reflect ancient and medieval history. The transformation of the Old Republic into the Galactic Empire parallels that of the Roman Republic which transformed into the Roman Empire in the same manner of conspiracy and manipulation. Lucas was quoted as saying: "I love history, so while the psychological basis of Star Wars is mythological, the political and social bases are historical".
- Author Nick Jamilla explains that unlike mainstream futuristic stories, with Star Wars, George Lucas ties in science fiction with ancient history, comparing the Jedi to the Samurai and historical European swordsmanship. He also parallels the spiritual aspects of the Jedi to eastern monks and philosophy.
- Star Wars reflects ancient history in its planetary settings. For example, the planet Coruscant imitates Ancient Rome as the capital of the Old Republic and later the Galactic Empire; whereas Tatooine (referring to Tataouine - a province south of Tunis in Tunisia, roughly where Lucas filmed for the planet) imitates the ancient Middle East (specifically the Arabian Peninsula) and North Africa in ancient times as being barren desert and sparsely populated (which it still is today to a certain degree). Coruscant and Naboo are also two of many planets in the Star Wars galaxy which exhibit architecture inspired by those of ancient Greece, Rome, and other ancient Mediterranean and southern/southeastern European societies.
- In his book The Medieval Hero on Screen: Representations from Beowulf to Buffy, author Tom Henthorne argues that 1970s science fiction films such as the Star Wars films and E.T. bring back neo-medieval themes at young boys with a masculine tone in his view. He argues the knighthood-type plots give a sense of encouragement to young boys and give girls the image of being their prizes or captives waiting to be rescued.
- The Samurai warriors of Japan are somewhat parallel to the concept of the Jedi as an elite warrior class specialized in combat and swordsmanship techniques charged with protecting their respective societies. The word "Jedi" was adapted by George Lucas from Japanese 時代劇 (jidaigeki) (meaning "period drama" motion pictures about samurai).
- The aesthetic of Jedi uniforms is borrowed from the styles of clothing worn by North African Tribesmen and various Sufi brotherhoods. It has also been argued by some that the name "Jedi" itself actually comes from the Arabic "Al-Jeddi'" which means "master of the mystic-warrior way."
- In an interview with 'The Muslim Magazine,' Dhul-Nun Owen spoke about George Lucas contacting members of the Habibiyyah Sufi Order in Berkeley, CA in order to do research for 'Star Wars.' However, there isn't a record of Lucas confirming this himself.
- Mahmoud Shelton of Stanford University wrote an article titled "Star Wars: A Tale of Spiritual Chivalry” wherein he explores the connection between the Order of the Jedi and the Orders of Futuwwa (Mediaeval Sufi Chivalry). Shelton maintains that the Skywalker story may be specifically compared to the Ancient Egyptian myth of Osiris and his son Horus, and that the word "Jedi" is related to the Djed through the imagery of the prequels.

=== Modern and early modern history ===
The stormtroopers from the films share a name with the Imperial German stormtroopers and the Nazi German Sturmabteilung (lit. 'Storm Division'). Imperial officers' uniforms also resemble some historical German Army uniforms and the political and security officers of the Empire resemble the black clad SS down to the imitation silver death's head insignia on their officer's caps (although the uniforms technically had more basis with the German Uhlans within the Prussian Empire). World War II terms were used for names in Star Wars; examples include the planets Kessel (a term that refers to a group of encircled forces) and Hoth (Hermann Hoth was a German general who served on the snow-laden Eastern Front). Lucas himself has drawn parallels between Palpatine and his rise to power to historical dictators such as Julius Caesar, Napoleon Bonaparte, and Adolf Hitler, saying the films exist as an examination of how democracies allow themselves to become dictatorships. The space battles in A New Hope were based on filmed World War I and World War II dogfights.

Continuing the use of Nazi inspiration for the Empire, J. J. Abrams, the director of The Force Awakens, has said that the First Order, an Imperial offshoot which serves as the main antagonist of the sequel trilogy, is also inspired by another aspect of the Nazi regime. Abrams spoke of how several Nazis fled to Argentina after the war and he claims that the concept for the First Order came from conversations between the scriptwriters about what would have happened if they had started working together again (The Boys from Brazil).

In a 2005 interview, George Lucas was asked the origins of the name "Darth Vader", and replied: "Darth is a variation of dark. And Vader is a variation of father. So it's basically Dark Father." (Rolling Stone, June 2, 2005). Vader is the Dutch word for "father" (the Dutch word is instead pronounced "fah-der"), and the German word for "father" (Vater) is similar. However, in the earliest scripts for Star Wars, the name "Darth Vader" was given to a human Imperial general with no apparent relationships.

Commentators have noted the strong political analogies in the Star Wars universe to contemporary American politics. Major analogies include Lucas's opposition to the Vietnam War being seen in the original trilogy. Lucas even said in 2005 that Star Wars "was really about the Vietnam War, and that was the period where Richard Nixon was trying to run for a [second] term, which got me to thinking historically about how do democracies get turned into dictatorships. Because the democracies aren't overthrown; they're given away." This claim was likewise backed up by the 1973 draft for the first film, then-called The Star Wars, where Lucas specifically mentioned that the theme involved an independent planet named Aquillae that was compared to North Vietnam, and that the Empire was "America 10 years from now", and by Walter Murch, who claimed Lucas, after his failure with Apocalypse Now, decided to do Star Wars as a way to channel the anti-war and pro-Vietcong ideology in a disguised form. Ian McDiarmid, when recalling something Lucas told him during filming of Return of the Jedi, also implied that the Oval Office, and in particular, Nixon's presidency, played a role in the design of the Emperor's throne room. Political themes in Rogue One have also been noted.

The political and military conflict of the prequel films, especially Attack of the Clones and Revenge of the Sith, bears a strong similarity to elements of the American Civil War (1861–1865): the Galactic Republic's Clone army (officially called the "Grand Army of the Republic") represents the Union Army (whose veteran organization was named Grand Army of the Republic), while the Confederacy of Independent Systems mimics the Confederate States of America (also abbreviated as "the Confederacy"). The character of Count Dooku is directly based on Confederate General Robert E. Lee.

== See also ==
- George Lucas in Love, a parody short film linking several Star Wars elements to the experiences of Lucas as a film student.
