= Freiheit =

Freiheit is the German word for both liberty and political freedom.

Freiheit may also refer to:

== Political parties ==
- South Tyrolean Freedom (Süd-Tiroler Freiheit, STF), a nationalist political party active in South Tyrol, a region of Italy historically ruled by Austria
- German Freedom Party (Die Freiheit), a political party in Germany

== Newspapers and magazines ==
- Freiheit (1879) (1879–1910), an anarchist journal established by Johann Most in London and moved to New York
- Die Freiheit (1918), daily of the Independent Social Democratic Party of Germany
- Junge Freiheit, a German weekly newspaper with nationalistic tendencies
- Morgen Freiheit (1922–1988), Yiddish-language daily of the Communist Party USA

== Culture ==
- Freiheit (film), a 1966 short film by George Lucas
- Freiheit (novel), a 2019 dystopian alternative history thriller by Ben Pickering
- Freiheit, the original title of Leo Perutz's 1918 novel From Nine to Nine
- Freiheit, an EP released in 2004 by Unheilig
- Freiheit, an album by German rapper Curse
- Münchener Freiheit (band), a German band also known as simply Freiheit
- "Freiheit" (song), a 1936 song by Gudrun Kabisch and Paul Dessau
- Jiyū no Tsubasa or Die Flügel der Freiheit (song), a song by Linked Horizon for the anime series, Attack on Titan
- "フライハイト (Freiheit)" (song), a 2021 song by Minami from her EP DROP

== Places ==
- Alte Freiheit, a historic square in Wuppertal-Elberfeld
- Freiheit (Königsberg), a type of medieval suburb of Königsberg
- Freiheit an der Aupa, former German name of the town Svoboda nad Úpou in the Czech Republic
- Große Freiheit, a cross street on the North Side to Hamburg's Reeperbahn
- Münchner Freiheit, a square in Munich's Schwabing

== People ==
- David Freiheit (born 1979), Canadian YouTuber
