= Doña Lupe =

- Directed by: Guillermo del Toro
- Written by: Guillermo del Toro
- Starring: Josefina Gonzalez de Silva; Jose Luis Vallejo; Jaime Arturo Vargas
- Cinematography: Jose Antonio Ascensio
- Edited by: Luis Kelly
- Release date: 1985
- Running time: 30 minutes
- Country: Mexico
- Language: Spanish

Doña Lupe is a 1985 short horror film written and directed by Guillermo del Toro. It is del Toro's ninth short film, though the first eight remain unreleased. Del Toro filmed Doña Lupe at 19 years of age; reviewers have noted that the film "feels like the work of an amateur artist getting to grips with his craft".

In 2008, Doña Lupe saw its first commercial release as part of the Cinema 16: World Short Films DVD collection. In the audio commentary, del Toro apologizes for the film's poor quality and recounts anecdotes from its troubled production.

== Plot ==
Policemen Bienvenido and Chato rent rooms in a house owned by Doña Lupe, an elderly woman in financial trouble. Doña Lupe mistrusts the men, but allows them to stay, as she needs the money. When they change the locks and begin smuggling suspicious materials into the house, Doña Lupe decides to take drastic measures.

== Cast ==
- Josefina González de Silva as Doña Lupe
- Jose Luis Vallejo as Bienvenido
- Jaime Arturo Vargas as Chato
- José Luis Vallejo as Bienvenido Almereida
- Jaime Arturo Vargas as Javier "Chato" Cañedo
- Hermilo Barba as Don Jesús
- Javier Cañedo as Mongol

== Production ==
The film reflects the taste for crime stories and horror film expressed by del Toro in a later interview. The director also states having expressly wanted to set the story in a provincial ambient.

It is del Toro's ninth short film but the first to have been presented to the public. This explains why the film is often presented as his directorial debut.

== Screenings ==
The film was screened at various festivals, including the first Guadalajara Film Festival, in 1986.
