= The Sheep Thief =

1997 British short film by Asif Kapadia

The Sheep Thief (aka Sheep's Feast)
- Directed by: Asif Kapadia
- Written by: Asif Kapadia
- Produced by: Victoria Connell
- Starring: Abdul Rehman; Soaib Karimbhai; Jigar Bikhabhai; Kokila Mahendra
- Cinematography: Roman Osin
- Edited by: Hugo Lawrence
- Music by: Dario Marianelli
- Production companies: Royal College of Art; Strawberry Vale
- Distributed by: British Council Film
- Release date: 1997
- Running time: 24 minutes
- Country: United Kingdom

The Sheep Thief (aka: Sheep's Feast) is a 1997 United Kingdom 16 mm short film by Asif Kapadia lasting 24 minutes, and is Kapadia's graduation film from the Royal College of Art.

== Production ==
The story idea was itself based upon a bible story told by a teacher to Kapadia when he was seven years old about a thief who became a saint. Understanding his concept would not work as well if shot in the United Kingdom, he raised funds and traveled to Rajasthan, India where he worked with film students from the Indian Film School, in Pune and cast and shot with local talent.

== Plot ==
Tashan (Abdul Rehman) is young street kid caught while stealing a sheep. He is branded on his forehead for stealing and left for dead. Waking, he covers the brand with a headband and embarks on a journey throughout rural India. On a backwoods dirt road he meets Safia (Kokila Mahendra), helps her, and eventually becomes an accepted member of her family.

== Cast ==
- Abdul Rehman as Tashan
- Soaib Karimbhai as Ya Ya
- Jigar Bikhabhai as Zed
- Kokila Mahendra as Safia

== Recognition ==
=== Awards and nominations ===
- 1998, won the Cinefondation's Deuxième Prix at the Cannes Film Festival
- 1997, won Grand Prix at Brest European Short Film Festival
- 1998, won 'Best Short Film Award' at St. Petersburg Film Festival
- 1999, won 'Best Short Film Award' at the International Children's Film Festival in Isfahan, Iran
- 1998, won 'Best Short Film' at Melbourne Film Festival
- 1998, won 'Best Director' award at Poitiers Film Festival
- 1998, won 'Most Promising Director Award' at Tel Aviv Film Festival
- 1998, won 'International Prix de Aaton' at Locarno Film Festival
- 1998, won 'Jury Prize' at New York Expo Short Film Festival
- 1998, won 'Jury Prize' at FilmVideo Montecatini International Short Film Festival
- 1997, won 'Best Cinematography' at Cinematexas International Short Film Festival

== Releases ==
The film is included on Cinema 16: British Short Films, the DVD of British Short films.

It screened at Clermont Ferrand, Toronto and London Film Festivals, was televised in the United Kingdom by Channel 4, and across Europe by Canal +, ZDF and Arte.
