= Wasp (2003 film) =

- Directed by: Andrea Arnold
- Written by: Andrea Arnold
- Produced by: Natasha Marsh
- Starring: Natalie Press
- Cinematography: Robbie Ryan
- Edited by: Nicolas Chaudeurge
- Production companies: Film4; UK Film Council; Cowboy Films
- Distributed by: The Criterion Collection (DVD)
- Release date: 2003
- Running time: 26 minutes
- Country: United Kingdom
- Language: English

Wasp is a 2003 British short film written and directed by Andrea Arnold. Released in 2003, it stars Natalie Press as a struggling single mother determined not to let her four young children prove an obstacle in the pursuit of starting a relationship with an old acquaintance, played by Danny Dyer. The setting is Arnold's hometown of Dartford.

The film is available on the Cinema 16: World Short Films and Cinema 16: European Short Films (US Special Edition) DVDs, and as a bonus feature on the Fish Tank DVD in the UK and the Red Road DVD in the US.

== Plot ==
Zoe rapidly descends a flight of stairs, baby in hand, and three other children in tow. She gets into a physical altercation with her neighbour. Tensions remain high as the two women and their children shout at one another and hurl insults.

They all head home, with the children asking for chips. A man then pulls up in a car and calls Zoe's name. She goes over to talk to him, and he questions who the children are. Zoe tells him that they belong to a friend of hers and she is just looking after them. He asks her if she would like to go for a drink, and she agrees to meet him.

The children inquire as to who the man is, and state that he looks like David Beckham. When Zoe reveals the man's name is David, her children are excited about this. Once they return home, Zoe attempts to find a sitter for the children. Zoe then notices a wasp flying near one of her windows, which she opens to release it.

Zoe is accompanied by her children who ask where she is going, to which she replies that she is going to the pub. When they arrive at their destination, Zoe leaves her children outside the pub to fend for themselves. She enters the pub to look for David. She eventually catches his eye; he is playing pool. David states that since Zoe is 'one of those modern girls,' she should purchase the first round of drinks herself. A reluctant Zoe goes up to the bar and orders drinks, which she cannot afford.

Meanwhile, her children attempt to amuse themselves outside the pub. Zoe brings them crisps and a glass of Coke. Her children are upset because Zoe did not bring them chips. She attempts to entertain them by singing and dancing. Zoe instructs her oldest child, Kelly, not to come in and get her unless it is a real emergency. That being said, she reenters the pub to play pool with David. In the next few shots, we witness the children entertaining themselves.

Meanwhile, back in the pub, Zoe and David are becoming reacquainted with one another. She is enjoying herself and trying to be oblivious to the needs of her children. As she leaves the pub to check on her children again, she passes the same neighbour she fought with earlier that day, who sneeringly remarks that Zoe will not be laughing when she has her kids taken off her by Social Services. When Zoe checks on her children, who have been waiting outside the pub for hours, they are not pleased that Zoe wants to spend more time with David.

David then emerges from the pub. Zoe and David get into David's car. They begin to kiss and the camera cuts to Zoe's baby crying. The children have been hungry all day and they want to go home. Four males exit the pub, one of whom drops some chips and ribs which Kelly eagerly picks up and shares with her siblings. Things then become quite heated between David and Zoe, who indulge in their passions in David's car while Zoe's children eat the ribs. Matters between David and Zoe are interrupted when one of her children shrieks, "Mum!" Zoe runs from the car when she hears her child's cry. She then sees a wasp crawling into her baby's mouth and pleads, "Don't sting him."

The wasp flies away and Zoe becomes enraged when she notices that there are remnants of ribs around her baby's mouth. She violently shakes Kelly and screams: "I told you to look after him, didn't I?" After chastising Kelly, the family then embraces and Zoe apologises. The next shot shows the children eating in David's car and Zoe looking embarrassed. A sympathetic David tells Zoe that he wants to have a chat as he drives the family home, the children singing along to a song on the radio.

== Cast ==
- Natalie Press – Zoe
- Danny Dyer – Dave
- Jodie Mitchell – Kelly
- Molly Griffiths – Sinead
- Kaitlyn Raynor – Leanne
- Danny Daley – Kai
- Lizzie Colbert – Bullet-head
- Ashley Routledge – Brown-haired girl
- Tabitha Crewe – Barmaid

== Production ==
Wasp was filmed entirely in Dartford.

== Accolades ==
Year	Association	Category	Nominee	Result	Ref.
2004	Academy Awards	Best Live Action Short Film	Andrea Arnold	Won	
2004	Bermuda International Film Festival	Bermuda Shorts Award	Andrea Arnold	Won	
2005	British Independent Film Award	Best British Short	Andrea Arnold	Nominated	
2004	International Short Film Festival Oberhausen	Main Prize	Andrea Arnold	Won	
2004	International Short Film Festival Oberhausen	Prize of the Ecumenical Jury – Honorable Mention	Andrea Arnold	Won	
2004	International Short Film Festival Oberhausen	Prize of the Ministry for Development, Culture and Sports	Andrea Arnold	Won	
2005	Sundance Film Festival	Short Filmmaking Award	Andrea Arnold	Won	
2004	Toronto Worldwide Short Film Festival	Best Live-Action Short	Andrea Arnold	Won	
2003	Stockholm Film Festival	Best Short Film	Andrea Arnold	Won	
2004	Regensburg Short Film Week	Best International Short Film	Andrea Arnold	Won	
2004	Palm Springs International ShortFest	Best of the Festival	Andrea Arnold	Won	
