= Sydney White =

2007 film by Joe Nussbaum

- Theatrical release poster
- Directed by: Joe Nussbaum
- Written by: Chad Gomez Creasey
- Based on: Snow White by the Brothers Grimm
- Produced by: James G. Robinson; David C. Robinson; Clifford Werber
- Starring: Amanda Bynes; Sara Paxton; Matt Long; Jack Carpenter; Jeremy Howard; John Schneider
- Cinematography: Mark Irwin
- Edited by: Danny Saphire
- Music by: Deborah Lurie
- Production company: Morgan Creek
- Distributed by: Universal Pictures
- Release date: September 21, 2007
- Running time: 108 minutes
- Country: United States
- Language: English
- Budget: $16.5 million
- Box office: $13.6 million

Sydney White is a 2007 American teen romantic comedy film directed by Joe Nussbaum and written by Chad Gomez Creasey based on the fairy tale of "Snow White" by the Brothers Grimm. The film, starring Amanda Bynes in the title role, Sara Paxton and Matt Long, was released theatrically on September 21, 2007, by Universal Pictures to generally negative reviews and performed poorly at the box office.

== Plot ==
Tomboy Sydney White, raised by her plumber father and his fellow construction workers, sets off to attend university and pledge to her late mother's sorority. She becomes friends with Demetria Rosemead "Dinky" Hotchkiss, also an incoming member of the Kappa Sorority. While on their way to their dorm, she meets Tyler Prince, president of a popular fraternity and the on-off boyfriend of student council president and Kappa Sorority head Rachel Witchburn. Several times a day Rachel checks a website that ranks the "hottest" in the university; she is always number one. Tyler is immediately smitten with Sydney, who gradually rises on the university hotness list, making Rachel jealous.

A Kappa Sorority initiation ritual requires the freshmen to find a date at midnight. Sydney finds allergy-stricken Lenny, one of a group of social outcasts called the "seven dorks", who live in a run-down frat house known as the Vortex. Rachel instructs Sydney to ditch her date, leaving Lenny to pay. Sydney fails to be inducted into Kappa after Rachel falsely claims she has lied about her background and cheated on a Kappa quiz. Sydney leaves that night in the rain and goes to sit in front of the Vortex, where she is welcomed by the other dorks: brilliant leader Terrence, cynical blogger Gurkin, womanizing Spanky, chronically shy Jeremy, jetlagged exchange student Embele, and naive George.

Sydney and the seven dorks try to topple Rachel from her student council presidency by running Terrence for president. In retaliation, Rachel brands Sydney and the dorks as traitors and declares Terrence disqualified as a presidential candidate, forcing them to evacuate their Vortex hideout and relocate to a motel. Sydney informs the dorks that she is running against Rachel for president. Sydney's stance against elitism and her interaction with disenfranchised groups across the campus earns respect, and she is ranked number one on the hotness list, distressing Rachel.

The day before the debate and election, Rachel hires a hacker to destroy Sydney's files using a virus called 'The Poison Apple'. Sydney must then stay up all night redoing her term paper in the library. She finishes and falls asleep, and, in danger of disqualification for not showing up, is awoken with a kiss by Tyler. Sydney is initially losing the debate attended only by the Greeks, but the debate is crashed by the rest of the school including the marching band. Boosted by the support, Sydney wins the debate and is elected president. Rachel is stripped of her Kappa privileges by her sisterhood for her years of cruelty to both them and the students, as well as her lying and cheating during the election.

Sydney's father and his construction worker friends fix the Vortex, and Sydney says they all live "dorkily ever after".

== Cast ==
- Amanda Bynes as Sydney White (Snow White)
  - Cree Ivey as Young Sydney White
- Sara Paxton as Rachel Witchburn (Evil Queen)
- Matt Long as Tyler Prince (Prince Charming)
- John Schneider as Paul White
- Crystal Hunt as Demetria Rosemead "Dinky" Hotchkiss (Rose Red)
- Jack Carpenter as Lenny (Sneezy)
- Jeremy Howard as Terrence (Doc)
- Adam Hendershott as Jeremy (Bashful)
- Danny Strong as Gurkin (Grumpy)
- Samm Levine as "Spanky" (Happy)
- Arnie Pantoja as George (Dopey)
- Donté Bonner as Embele (Sleepy)
- Brian Patrick Clarke as Professor Carleton
- Libby Mintz as Christy
- Lisandra Vazquez as Amy
- Lauren Leech as Katy
- Kierstin Koppel as Goth Girl

== Production ==
Principal photography took place in and around Orlando from February 14, 2007, to April 4, 2007. Filming locations included the University of Central Florida, Rollins College, and University High School (Orlando).

== Reception ==
=== Box office ===
Sydney White opened on September 21, 2007, in the United States in 2,104 venues. In its opening weekend, the film earned $5,196,380 in the box office, ranking sixth place and third of the week's new releases. At the end of its run, the film grossed $11,892,415 domestically and $1,727,660 overseas for a worldwide total of $13,620,075. Based on an estimated $16.5 million budget, the film was a box office bomb.

=== Critical response ===
On Rotten Tomatoes, the film holds a 36% rating based on 84 reviews with an average rating of 4.94/10. The website's critical consensus reads: "Amanda Bynes is charming, but Sydney White is a poorly adapted take on Snow White, relying on tired ethnic stereotypes laughs." On Metacritic, the film had an average score of 45 out of 100, based on reviews from 21 critics, indicating "Mixed or average reviews". Audiences surveyed by CinemaScore gave the film a grade "A−" on scale of A to F.

== See also ==
- Revenge of the Nerds
- The House Bunny
