= Disconnected (The Buzzhorn album) =

Studio album by The Buzzhorn
- Released: August 6, 2002
- Recorded: 2002
- Genre: Post-grunge
- Length: 44:17
- Label: Atlantic
- Producer: Howard Benson

Professional ratings
Review scores
Source	Rating
AllMusic	4/5 stars

Disconnected, released on August 6, 2002, by Atlantic Records, is the only studio album released by American rock band The Buzzhorn on a major label. The song "Ordinary" was an international hit single and appeared on the soundtrack of the 2002 video game Need for Speed: Hot Pursuit 2.

== Track listing ==
1. "To Live Again" - 4:08
2. "Ordinary" - 3:09
3. "Satisfied" - 3:20
4. "Pinned to the Ground" - 4:00
5. "Out of My Hands" - 3:35
6. "Isn't This Great" - 3:32
7. "Disconnected" - 2:49
8. "Come See Me" - 3:28
9. "Rhino" - 3:16
10. "Waste of a Man" - 4:02
11. "Carry Me Home" - 3:13
12. "Holy Man" - 5:45

Total length: 44:17
