= Jabberwocky (1971 film) =

- English title card
- Directed by: Jan Švankmajer
- Written by: Jan Švankmajer
- Produced by: Erna Kmínková; Marta Šíchová; Jiří Vaněk
- Cinematography: Boris Baromykin
- Edited by: Helena Lebdušková
- Music by: Zdeněk Liška
- Production company: Krátký film Praha
- Distributed by: STM
- Release date: 1971
- Running time: 14 minutes
- Country: Czechoslovakia
- Language: English

Jabberwocky (Czech: Žvahlav aneb šatičky slaměného Huberta, "Jabberwocky, or Hubert's Straw Hats") is a 1971 Czechoslovak animated short film written and directed by Jan Švankmajer, based loosely on the 1871 poem "Jabberwocky" by Lewis Carroll and on a children's book Anička skřítek a Slaměný Hubert ("Anička the Sprite and Straw Hubert") by Czech surrealist Vítězslav Nezval, which is referenced in the Czech title.

== Plot ==
The poem by Lewis Carroll is read as a wardrobe is shown moving through a forest. The wardrobe opens to reveal a strange playroom inside that is watched over the portrait of a stern old man; the wardrobe itself is now against the far wall of the playroom. A boy's sailor suit escapes the wardrobe to dance around by itself before the room is filled with branches that quickly sprout leaves, bloom, and produce fruit. The fruits fall from the branches and burst on the floor, where they are revealed to be full of worms. A doll is knocked over and other, smaller dolls scramble free of its body. They are in turn cooked and consumed by still larger dolls. Still more small dolls are chased around a table by a flatiron, which presses them into paper dolls. The sailor suit returns to unleash an army of tin soldiers that do battle with a large baby doll that eventually defeats them; the baby doll then opens to reveal the rubber nipple of a baby bottle. A child's lesson book opens and tears out its own leaves to make paper airplanes that fly away through the window. A folding knife with a handle shaped like a woman appears on a table that is covered with a lace doily. The knife unfolds itself and does a short dance while its point tears the doily to tatters. The knife closes itself into its woman-shaped handle and blood pours out of the woman's back, staining the doily's remains.

Interspersed between these scenes is a recurring sequence of a child's maze drawn on toy blocks, in which a line struggles to free itself; whenever it hits a dead end, a live-action black cat leaps out and scatters the blocks. In the final sequence, the line reaches the end of the maze and is free to scrawl all over the walls of the playroom. The line pauses to deface the portrait of the old man before fleeing out of the window. The wardrobe opens once more to reveal a man's dark, stodgy suit where the playful sailor suit once hung and the black cat in a cage.

== Production ==
The film was produced by Krátký film Praha for Weston Woods Studios.

== Home media ==
Jabberwocky was included on a DVD Cinema 16: European Short Films, anthology of short films by famous European directors, which was released by the studio Warp Films on June 5, 2006.
