= The Buzzhorn =

American rock band

Background information
- Origin: Milwaukee, Wisconsin, U.S.
- Genres: Post-grunge
- Years active: 1997–2003, 2014
- Labels: Atlantic
- Members: Ryan Mueller (vocals); Todd Joseph (bass); Bert Zweber (guitar); Rob Bueno (drums)

The Buzzhorn was an American post-grunge band from Milwaukee, Wisconsin. Formed in 1997, the band consisted of Bert Zweber (guitars), Ryan Mueller (vocals, guitars), Todd Joseph (bass), and Rob Bueno (drums). They released their only major-label album, Disconnected, in 2002 through Atlantic Records. Their song "Ordinary" was notable for being featured on the soundtrack of the 2002 video game Need for Speed Hot Pursuit 2. The band split up in 2003 after completing their contract with Atlantic and have since conducted one reunion show in 2014.

== History ==
=== Formation and independent releases (1997–2001) ===
The band's lineup consisted of Bert Zweber (guitars), Ryan Mueller (vocals), Todd Joseph (bass), and Rob Bueno (drums). In 1997, the group began performing around the Milwaukee club circuit. In 1998, they recorded their debut album, self-producing it on a tight budget. The end result was A Complete Package of Action-Packed Tragedies, which drew praise among local music critics. In 2000, Buzzhorn self-released an EP. A label representative of Atlantic Records heard the band and signed them to a contract in January 2001.

=== Release of Disconnected and breakup (2002–2003) ===
In 2002, Buzzhorn released their debut single "Ordinary" which was followed by the full-length album Disconnected in July 2002. It was produced by Howard Benson (Papa Roach, P.O.D., Cold, Hoobastank). The Buzzhorn's major label debut brought them praise for bringing a fresh approach to the hard rock world, with Hit Parader magazine labelling The Buzzhorn as "the new hard rock rookies of the year", as well as a 4-star review from Metal Edge magazine. The band toured with Seether, Injected, Deftones, Default, and Jerry Cantrell, among others, in support of Disconnected.

The album is estimated to have sold at least 10,000 copies, almost directly due to music from the album being included in the video game Need for Speed Hot Pursuit 2. The band cites poor promotion and support for the poor sales performance, specifically Atlantic Records's promotion of the hard rock act Taproot. Shortly after the release of the album, the band split in 2003 after completing their contract with Atlantic.

=== Post-breakup and reunion show (2004–2014) ===
Following the completion of the band's contract, Todd Joseph moved to California, where he worked on other projects as well as producing acts. Zweber joined a local Milwaukee band called King Gun made up of former members of the Milwaukee hard rock act Big Dumb Dick. King Gun released a three-song demo in 2004 before splitting. The lead singer of King Gun reformed Big Dumb Dick in early 2008 and has recruited Bert as their new guitarist replacing Paris Ortiz.

In October 2011, it was rumoured on the bands unofficial Facebook page that the band will be reformed. The line up should consist of all original members, including Ryan Mueller (vocals), Todd Joseph (bass), Bert Zweber (guitar), Rob Bueno (drums). In December 2012, Joseph confirmed that six new songs were written and that band is planning to record them in the studio in mid-January 2013. Joseph made a post on August 5, 2014 on bands Facebook page the band is officially reunited to perform a one-night reunion show. It took place on September 13, 2014 at a local Milwaukee club called The Bottle to celebrate its 10th anniversary. Since then, no further information about current status of The Buzzhorn was given.

=== Other projects (2014–present) ===
Todd Joseph became a tour manager for bands Violent Femmes and Vintage Trouble in 2015. Bert Zweber joined a local Milwaukee band called Black Belt Theatre as their new guitarist in 2016. Rob Bueno and Ryan Mueller are not involved in any musical projects and both currently reside in Milwaukee, Wisconsin.

== Discography ==
=== Albums ===
Release date	Title	Label
1999	A Complete Package of Action-Packed Tragedies	Self-released
2000	The Buzzhorn (EP)	Self-released
August 6, 2002	Disconnected	Atlantic Records / WEA
