= Who's My Favourite Girl? =

1999 film

Who's My Favourite Girl? is a short film, written and directed by Adrian McDowall in 1999. The film's two leads are Tarek Hamad and Ross Wright, and the film was produced by Joern Utkilen and Kara Johnston. The film won a BAFTA award in the Best Short Film category in 1999, and the award was presented by Leslie Nielsen.

== Plot ==
The film is a comedy, which tells the story of Andy (Ross Wright), an immature school boy who finds out that May (Katrina Byan) has the hots for him. Andy panics and enlists his wiser and more mature friend John (Tarek Hamad) to teach him everything he needs to know about the opposite sex and sex in general. The film is based loosely on McDowall's experiences growing up in the eighties.

== Cast ==
- Ross Wright as Andy
- Tarek Hamad as John
- Katrina Bryan as May

== Awards ==
- 53rd British Academy Film Awards
- WON: Best Short Film
- Gijon International Film Festival
- WON: Special Prize of the Young Jury
