= Joe Nussbaum =

American film director and screenwriter (born 1973)

- Born: January 10, 1973 (age 53); United States
- Occupations: Film director, screenwriter

Joseph Nussbaum (born January 10, 1973) is an American film director and screenwriter. Nussbaum got his break into the film industry by passing around Hollywood offices his short film George Lucas in Love. The success of the film eventually got him a deal with DreamWorks, and he has since directed films such as the 2004 production Sleepover, the 2006 film American Pie Presents: The Naked Mile and the 2007 film Sydney White starring Amanda Bynes. He has also co-written such screenplays as 2016's The Late Bloomer.

He also directed the Walt Disney Pictures film Prom, starring Aimee Teegarden and Nicholas Braun. Nussbaum also directed a number of television series including MTV's Awkward and Zach Stone Is Gonna Be Famous, ABC's Back in the Game and Super Fun Night, and FOX's Surviving Jack. From 2015 to 2019, he directed the television series Just Add Magic from Amazon Network.

== Personal life ==
Nussbaum is a graduate of Brighton High School in Rochester, New York, where he was one of the co-creators of Brighton Beat, a weekly news show that was broadcast throughout the school. Brighton Beat was the precursor to The Morning Show, a daily news show that is broadcast in the school to this day. Nussbaum is also a graduate of the University of Southern California.

== Filmography ==
=== Director ===
- George Lucas in Love (short film) (1999)
- Sleepover (2004)
- American Pie Presents: The Naked Mile (2006)
- Sydney White (2007)
- Prom (2011)
- Upside-Down Magic (2020)

=== Writer ===
- The Late Bloomer (2016)
