= Cinema 16: World Short Films =

- Directed by: Various
- Produced by: Luke Morris; Ben Lederman
- Distributed by: Momac Films/ Warp Films
- Release date: 2008
- Running time: 303 minutes
- Language: English

Cinema16: World Short Films is a DVD featuring short films from multiple countries, directed by the likes of Guillermo del Toro, Alfonso Cuarón and Park Chan-Wook, as well as less widely known directors. It is the fifth and, to date, last in a series of DVDs released by Cinema16.

== Contents ==
The short films included are Wasp, Judgement (Simpan), Sikumi (On the Ice), Doña Lupe, The Old Lady and the Pigeons, Attack on the Bakery, Two Cars, One Night, Sonata for Hitler, My Dad is 100 Years Old, Forklift Driver Klaus, Uncle, Quartet for the End of Time, Madame Tutli-Putli, A Girl's Own Story, Borom Sarret, and Soft.

== Reception ==
A Movie Mail review says, "Add to this a couple of characteristically invigorating shorts by Mexico's Guillermo del Toro and Alfonso Cuarón, and a wonderfully left-field experiment in biography by Guy Maddin and Isabella Rossellini, and you have an essential collection."

A Scotsman review says, "With many of the films boasting insightful director commentaries, too, it's also like having your own film-school tutorials. The best one comes from Guillermo del Toro, courtesy of the self-deprecating chat-track for his extremely rough-looking noir thriller, Doña Lupe, shot when he was 19.

A DVD Verdict review criticised the release for including Wasp - "Been there, done that."
