= The Short and Curlies =

The Short & Curlies
- David Thewlis
- Directed by: Mike Leigh
- Written by: Mike Leigh
- Produced by: Simon Channing-Williams; Victor Glynn
- Starring: Alison Steadman; Wendy Nottingham; Sylvestra Le Touzel; David Thewlis
- Cinematography: Roger Pratt
- Edited by: Jon Gregory
- Music by: Rachel Portman
- Distributed by: FilmFour International
- Release date: 1987
- Running time: 18 minutes
- Country: United Kingdom
- Language: English

The Short & Curlies is a 1987 short film written and directed by Mike Leigh. It stars Alison Steadman, Wendy Nottingham, Sylvestra Le Touzel and David Thewlis.

== Reception ==
The Short & Curlies was nominated for a BAFTA Award for Best Short Film.
