= Je t'aime John Wayne =

British short film

- Directed by: Toby MacDonald
- Release date: 2000

Je t'aime John Wayne (2000) is a ten-minute short film parody directed by Toby MacDonald about a young man in London obsessed with imitating Jean-Paul Belmondo in the film Breathless, who in turn was pretending to be Humphrey Bogart. One of the film's writers, Luke Ponte, describes it as, "an Englishman who thinks he's a French man who thinks he's an American." It was distributed on DVD as part of the collection Cinema 16: British Short Films and in the U.S. as Cinema 16: European Short Films.
