= Boy and Bicycle =

1962 British film by Ridley Scott

- Directed by: Ridley Scott
- Written by: Ridley Scott
- Produced by: Ridley Scott
- Starring: Tony Scott
- Cinematography: Ridley Scott
- Release date: 1965
- Running time: 27 minutes
- Country: United Kingdom
- Language: English

Boy and Bicycle is a 1965 black and white short film directed and written by Ridley Scott and starring his brother Tony Scott. It was Scott's first film, shot on 16mm film while he was a photography student at the Royal College of Art in London.

Although a very early work – Scott would not direct his first feature for another 14 years – the film is significant in that it features a number of visual elements that would become motifs of Scott's work. Shot in 1960 or 1961 entirely in West Hartlepool and Seaton Carew the film features the cooling tower and blast furnaces of the British Steel North Works foreshadowing images in Alien, Blade Runner and Black Rain. The central element of a boy on a bicycle is re-used in Scott's 1973 TV advert The Bike Ride for Hovis.

== Cast ==
- Tony Scott as the boy

== Production ==
Scott said of the film:

At the time I was very influenced by the English film makers; Karel Reisz, Tony Richardson, that era of social realism. I had no audience in mind but myself plus the challenge of making the film. There was no one to advise us – I didn't know any film-makers and this wasn't a film school. It was a one-man band with one actor (my brother Tony). We humped and carried all the equipment everywhere we went. My father once drove his car with me in the trunk filming Tony behind. Very efficient and it worked great.

Scott secured finance from the British Film Institute (BFI)'s Experimental Film Fund to complete the editing and sound in 1965 including a track by John Barry called "Onward Christian Spacemen", which originally appeared as the B-side of a cover version of the theme to The Human Jungle television series. Scott wanted to use the existing recording, but was unable to afford the rights; Barry agreed to produce a new recording for the film.

== Release ==
This film has been released as an extra on the Paramount DVD of Scott's first feature The Duellists and The Criterion Collection Blu-Ray and 4K UHD of Scott's Thelma & Louise. It may be viewed, free of charge, at the BFI website.
