= Freiheit (film) =

- Directed by: George Lucas
- Written by: George Lucas
- Starring: Randal Kleiser
- Cinematography: George Lucas
- Edited by: George Lucas
- Distributed by: University of Southern California
- Release date: 1966
- Running time: 3 minutes
- Language: English

Freiheit (German for "freedom") is a 1966 short film by George Lucas, made while he was a student at the University of Southern California's film school. His third film, it was the first to contain a narrative.

== Plot ==
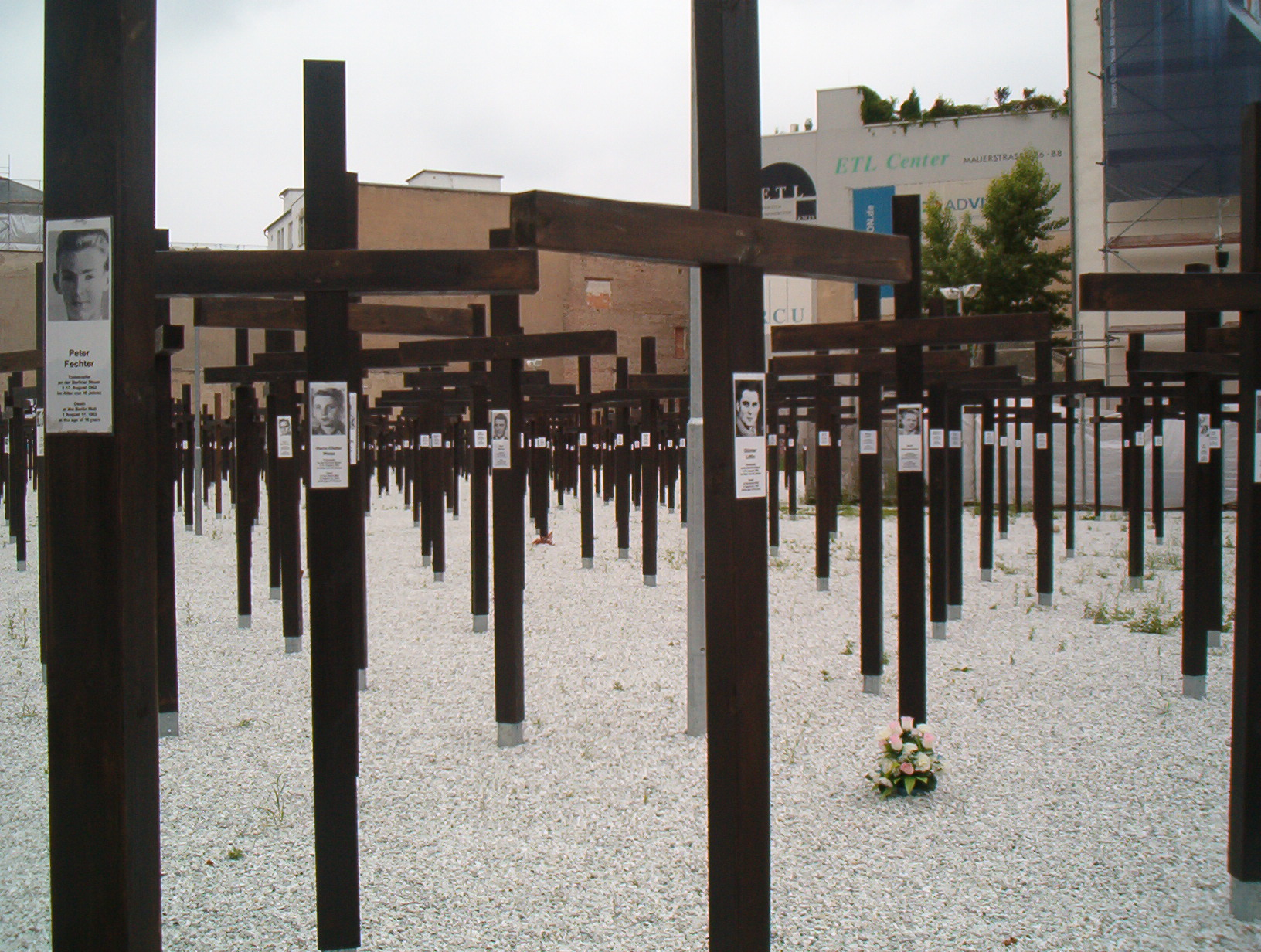
A memorial in Berlin from 2004 to 2005 to those who lost their lives attempting to cross the Berlin Wall near Checkpoint Charlie

The film follows a young East German man (Randal Kleiser) who is running through the forest as he attempts to escape to freedom. When he encounters the clearing that marks the border with West Germany, he tries to run across it, but ends up being shot multiple times by the border guards and is soon after shot dead before he could drag himself across the actual line. As he does so, various voices comment on the nature of freedom. At the end of the film, an armed guard approaches and inspects the man's body.

== Production ==
The movie was filmed entirely in Malibu Creek, California.

== See also ==
- List of American films of 1966
