= Critics' Choice Super Award for Best Actress in a Superhero Movie =

Annual US film award

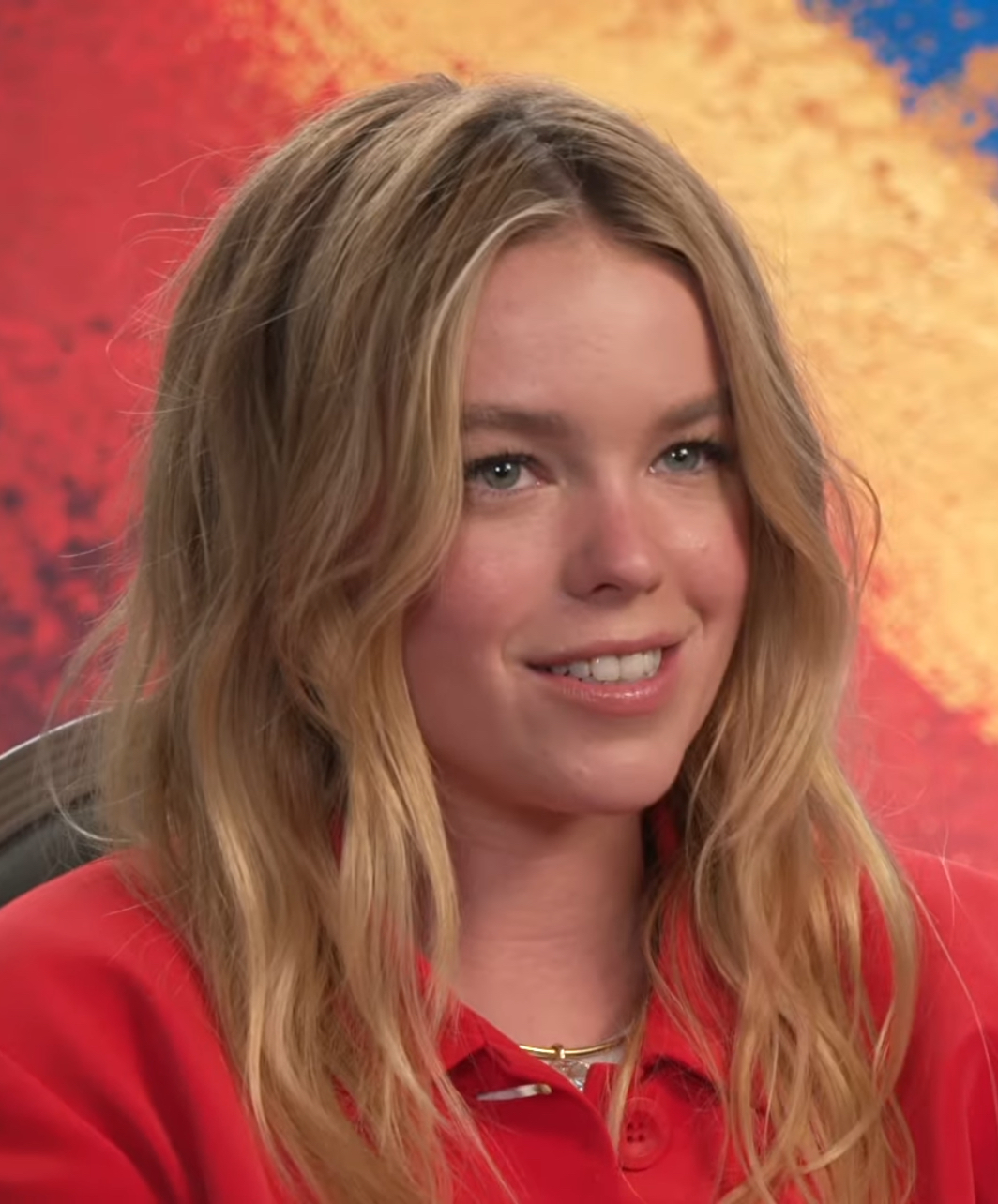
- The 2026 recipient: Milly Alcock
- Country: United States
- Presented by: Critics Choice Association
- First award: 2021
- Currently held by: Milly Alcock, Supergirl (2026)

Highlights
- Most wins: Florence Pugh (2)
- Most nominations: Florence Pugh; Margot Robbie; (2)
- Website: http://www.criticschoice.com/

The Critics' Choice Super Award for Best Actress in a Superhero Movie is an award presented by the Critics Choice Association to the best performance by an actress in a superhero film.

This award was first presented at the 1st Critics' Choice Super Awards in 2021 to Margot Robbie for her role as Harley Quinn in Birds of Prey (and the Fantabulous Emancipation of One Harley Quinn). Robbie and Florence Pugh are the most nominated actresses in this category with two nominations each.

The current recipient of the award is Milly Alcock for her role as Kara Zor-El / Supergirl in Supergirl.

== Winners and nominees ==
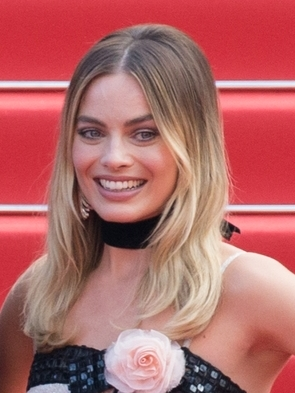
Margot Robbie won for Birds of Prey (2020)

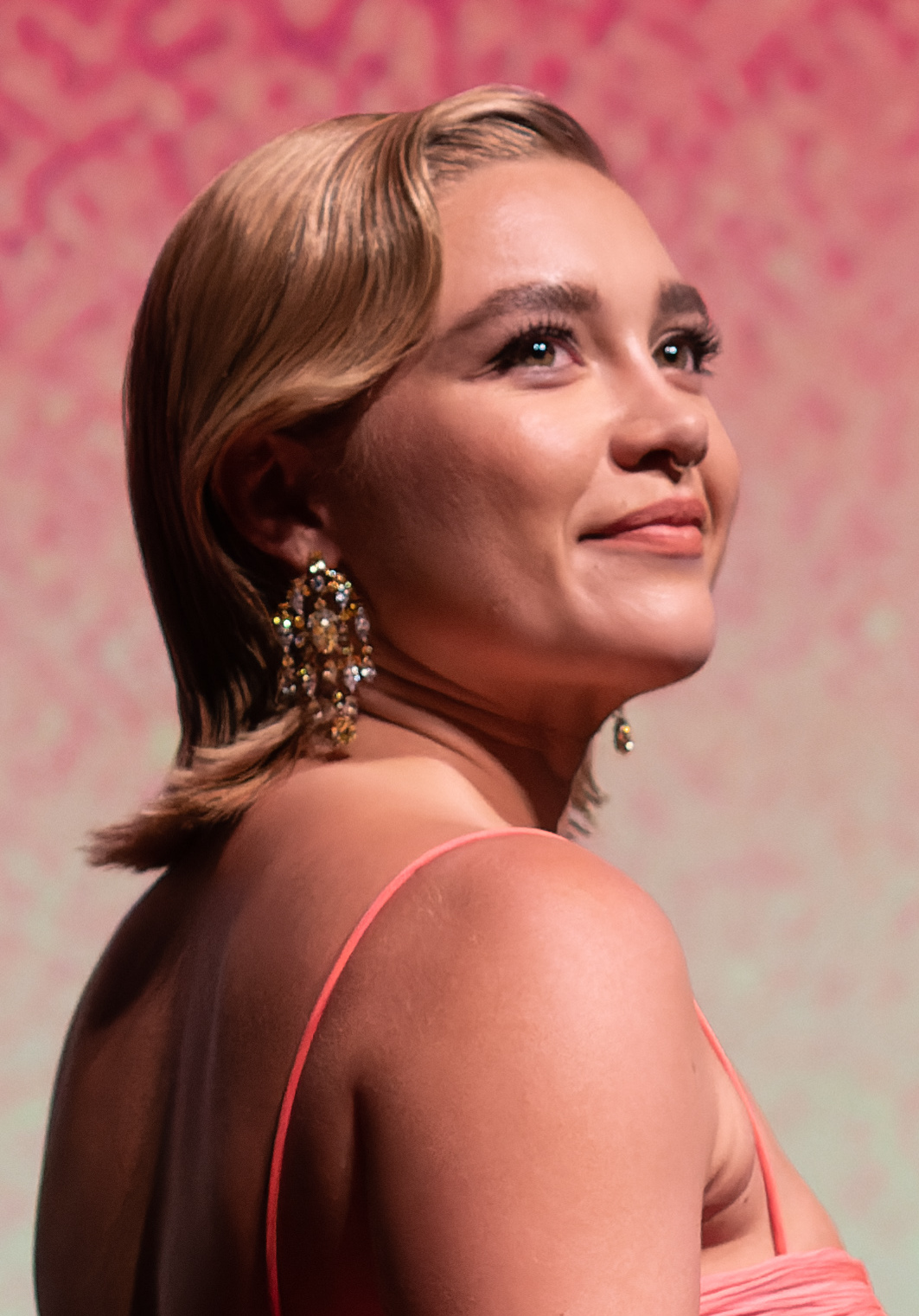
Florence Pugh won twice for Black Widow (2021) and Thunderbolts* (2024)

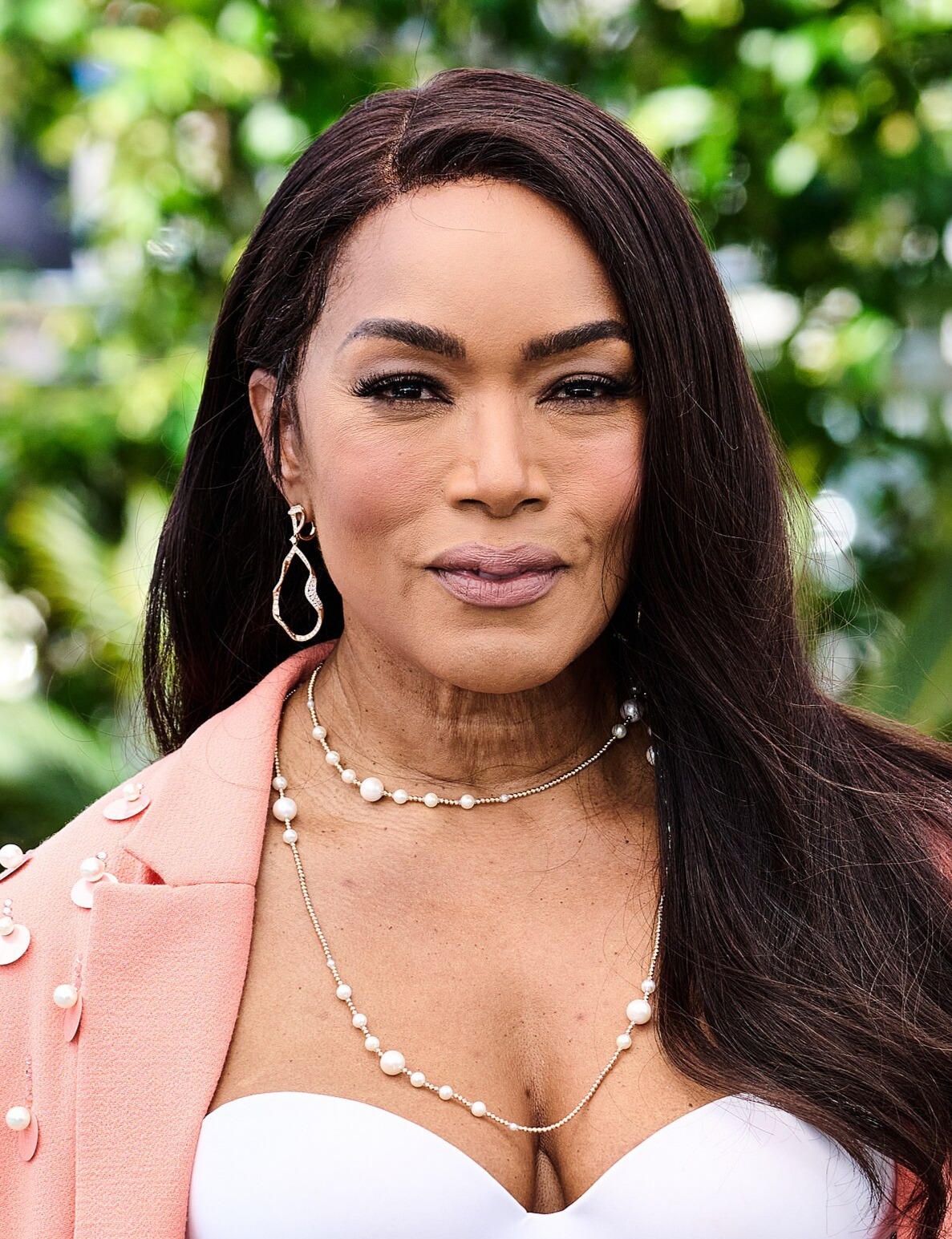
Angela Bassett won for Black Panther: Wakanda Forever (2022).

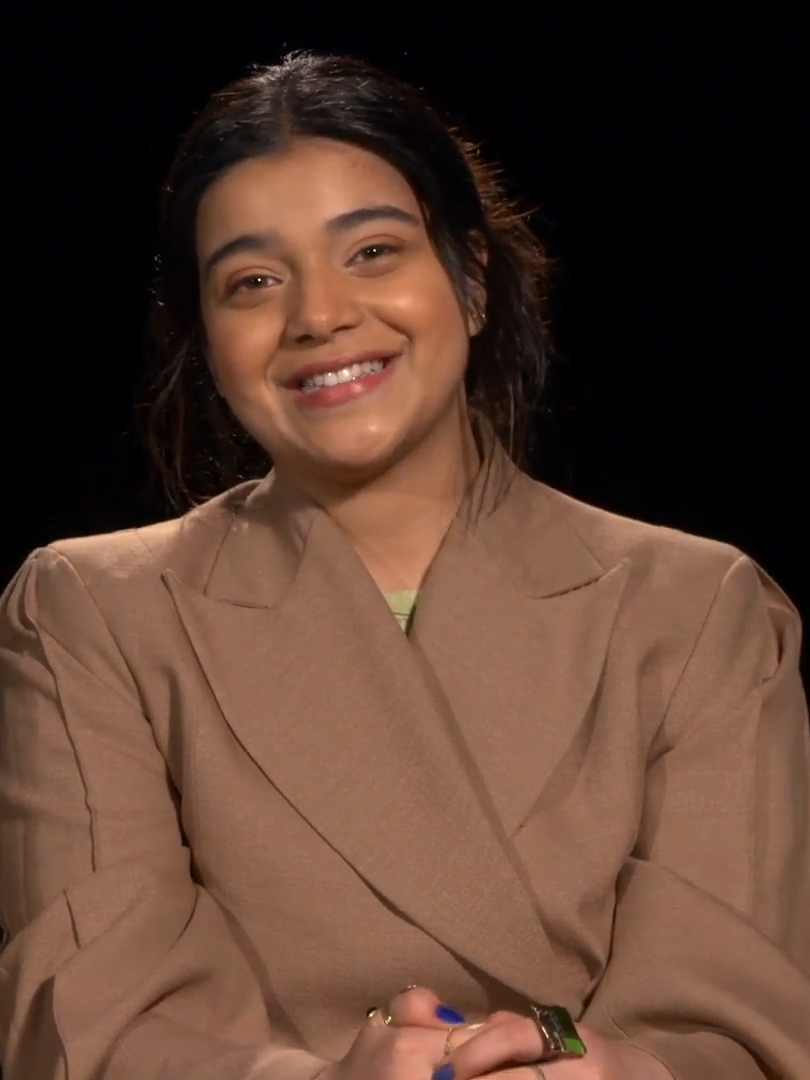
Iman Vellani won for The Marvels (2023)

=== 2020s ===
Year	Actor	Role(s)	Project(s)	Ref.
2020	Margot Robbie	Harley Quinn	Birds of Prey (and the Fantabulous Emancipation of One Harley Quinn)	
2020	KiKi Layne	Nile Freeman	The Old Guard	
2020	Peyton Elizabeth Lee	Princess Samantha "Sam"	Secret Society of Second-Born Royals	
2020	Jurnee Smollett	Dinah Lance / Black Canary	Birds of Prey (and the Fantabulous Emancipation of One Harley Quinn)	
2020	Charlize Theron	Andy / Andromache of Scythia	The Old Guard	
2021	Florence Pugh	Yelena Belova	Black Widow	
2021	Gal Gadot	Diana Prince / Wonder Woman	Zack Snyder's Justice League	
2021	Scarlett Johansson	Natasha Romanoff / Black Widow	Black Widow	
2021	Margot Robbie	Harley Quinn	The Suicide Squad	
2021	Michelle Yeoh	Ying Nan	Shang-Chi and the Legend of the Ten Rings	
2021	Zendaya	Michelle "MJ" Jones-Watson	Spider-Man: No Way Home	
2022	Angela Bassett	Queen Ramonda	Black Panther: Wakanda Forever	
2022	Zoë Kravitz	Selina Kyle / Catwoman	The Batman	
2022	Elizabeth Olsen	Wanda Maximoff / Scarlet Witch	Doctor Strange in the Multiverse of Madness	
2022	Natalie Portman	Jane Foster	Thor: Love and Thunder	
2022	Letitia Wright	Shuri / Black Panther	Black Panther: Wakanda Forever	
2023	Iman Vellani	Kamala Khan / Ms. Marvel	The Marvels	
2023	Ayo Edebiri	April O'Neil	Teenage Mutant Ninja Turtles: Mutant Mayhem	
2023	Chloë Grace Moretz	Nimona	Nimona	
2023	Zoe Saldaña	Gamora	Guardians of the Galaxy Vol. 3	
2023	Hailee Steinfeld	Gwen Stacy / Spider-Gwen	Spider-Man: Across the Spider-Verse	
2024	Florence Pugh	Yelena Belova	Thunderbolts*	
2024	Emma Corrin	Cassandra Nova	Deadpool & Wolverine	
2024	Vera Drew	Joker the Harlequin / Vera	The People's Joker	
2024	Lady Gaga	Harley "Lee" Quinzel	Joker: Folie à Deux	
2024	Jennifer Garner	Elektra Natchios	Deadpool & Wolverine	
2024	Julia Louis-Dreyfus	Valentina Allegra de Fontaine	Thunderbolts*	
2025	Milly Alcock	Kara Zor-El / Supergirl	Supergirl	
2025	Rachel Brosnahan	Lois Lane	Superman	
2025	Julia Garner	Shalla-Bal / Silver Surfer	The Fantastic Four: First Steps	
2025	Vanessa Kirby	Sue Storm / Invisible Woman	The Fantastic Four: First Steps	
2025	Camila Mendes	Teela	Masters of the Universe	
2025	Adeline Rudolph	Kitana	Mortal Kombat II	

== Performers with multiple wins ==
2 wins

- Florence Pugh

== Performers with multiple nominations ==
2 nominations

- Florence Pugh
- Margot Robbie

== See also ==
- Critics' Choice Super Award for Best Superhero Movie
- Critics' Choice Super Award for Best Actor in a Superhero Movie
