= Critics' Choice Super Award for Best Actor in a Superhero Movie =

Film award

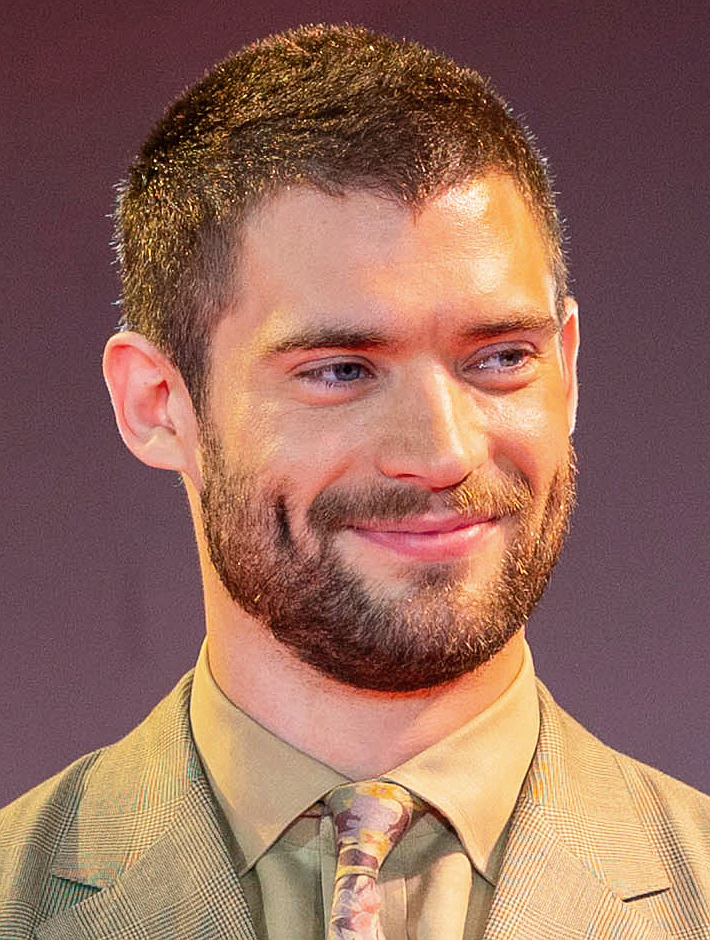
- The 2026 recipient: David Corenswet
- Country: United States
- Presented by: Critics Choice Association
- First award: 2021
- Currently held by: David Corenswet, Superman (2026)
- Website: http://www.criticschoice.com/

The Critics' Choice Super Award for Best Actor in a Superhero Movie is an award presented by the Critics Choice Association to the best performance by an actor in a superhero film.

This award was first presented in 2021 to Ewan McGregor for his role as Roman Sionis / Black Mask in Birds of Prey (and the Fantabulous Emancipation of One Harley Quinn).

The current recipient of the award is David Corenswet for his role as Clark Kent / Superman in Superman.

== Winners and nominees ==
Year	Actor	Role(s)	Project(s)	Ref.
2021	Ewan McGregor	Roman Sionis / Black Mask	Birds of Prey (and the Fantabulous Emancipation of One Harley Quinn)	
2021	Skylar Astin	Professor James Borrow	Secret Society of Second-Born Royals	
2021	Jim Carrey	Dr. Robotnik	Sonic the Hedgehog	
2021	Chiwetel Ejiofor	James Copley	The Old Guard	
2021	Ben Schwartz	Sonic	Sonic the Hedgehog	
2022	Andrew Garfield	Peter Parker / Spider-Man / "Peter-Three"	Spider-Man: No Way Home	
2022	John Cena	Christopher Smith / Peacemaker	The Suicide Squad	
2022	Idris Elba	Robert DuBois / Bloodsport	The Suicide Squad	
2022	Tom Holland	Peter Parker / Spider-Man / "Peter-One"	Spider-Man: No Way Home	
2022	Tony Leung Chiu-wai	Xu Wenwu	Shang-Chi and the Legend of the Ten Rings	
2022	Simu Liu	Shang-Chi	Shang-Chi and the Legend of the Ten Rings	
2023	Colin Farrell	Oswald "Oz" Cobb / The Penguin	The Batman	
2023	Paul Dano	Edward Nashton / The Riddler	The Batman	
2023	Benedict Cumberbatch	Dr. Stephen Strange	Doctor Strange in the Multiverse of Madness	
2023	Tenoch Huerta	Namor	Black Panther: Wakanda Forever	
2023	Robert Pattinson	Bruce Wayne / Batman	The Batman	
2024	Michael Fassbender	The Killer	The Killer	
2024	Bradley Cooper	Rocket	Guardians of the Galaxy Vol. 3	
2024	Taron Egerton	Henk Rogers	Tetris	
2024	Xolo Maridueña	Jaime Reyes / Blue Beetle	Blue Beetle	
2024	Shameik Moore	Miles Morales / Spider-Man	Spider-Man: Across the Spider-Verse	
2025	Hugh Jackman	Logan / Wolverine	Deadpool & Wolverine	
2025	David Harbour	Alexei Shostakov / Red Guardian	Thunderbolts*	
2025	Tom Hardy	Eddie Brock / Venom	Venom: The Last Dance	
2025	Anthony Mackie	Sam Wilson / Captain America	Captain America: Brave New World	
2025	Lewis Pullman	Robert "Bob" Reynolds / Sentry / Void	Thunderbolts*	
2025	Ryan Reynolds	Wade Wilson / Deadpool	Deadpool & Wolverine	
2026	David Corenswet	Clark Kent / Superman	Superman	
2026	Nicholas Galitzine	Adam Glenn / He-Man	Masters of the Universe	
2026	Edi Gathegi	Michael Holt / Mister Terrific	Superman	
2026	Nicholas Hoult	Lex Luthor	Superman	
2026	Kazunari Ninomiya	Lost Man	Exit 8	
2026	Pedro Pascal	Reed Richards / Mister Fantastic	The Fantastic Four: First Steps	

== See also ==
- Critics' Choice Super Award for Best Superhero Movie
- Critics' Choice Super Award for Best Actress in a Superhero Movie
