= Thunderbolts* =

2025 Marvel Studios film

- Theatrical release poster
- Directed by: Jake Schreier
- Screenplay by: Eric Pearson; Joanna Calo
- Story by: Eric Pearson
- Based on: Marvel Comics
- Produced by: Kevin Feige
- Starring: Florence Pugh; Sebastian Stan; Wyatt Russell; Olga Kurylenko; Lewis Pullman; Geraldine Viswanathan; Chris Bauer; Wendell Pierce; David Harbour; Hannah John-Kamen; Julia Louis-Dreyfus
- Cinematography: Andrew Droz Palermo
- Edited by: Angela Catanzaro; Harry Yoon
- Music by: Son Lux
- Production company: Marvel Studios
- Distributed by: Walt Disney Studios Motion Pictures
- Release dates: April 22, 2025 (Cineworld Leicester Square); May 2, 2025 (United States)
- Running time: 127 minutes
- Country: United States
- Language: English
- Budget: $180 million
- Box office: $382.4 million

Thunderbolts* (Note: The asterisk refers to the reveal that the Thunderbolts team become the New Avengers. The title is changed to The New Avengers during the end credits and in some post-release marketing, but Thunderbolts* remains the film's official title.) is a 2025 American superhero film based on Marvel Comics featuring the team Thunderbolts. Produced by Marvel Studios and distributed by Walt Disney Studios Motion Pictures, it is the 36th film in the Marvel Cinematic Universe (MCU). The film was directed by Jake Schreier from a screenplay by Eric Pearson and Joanna Calo, and stars an ensemble cast featuring Florence Pugh, Sebastian Stan, Wyatt Russell, Olga Kurylenko, Lewis Pullman, Geraldine Viswanathan, Chris Bauer, Wendell Pierce, David Harbour, Hannah John-Kamen, and Julia Louis-Dreyfus. In the film, a group of antiheroes are caught in a trap and forced to work together on a mission that uncovers their traumatic pasts.

Marvel Studios first teased the formation of an MCU Thunderbolts team in 2021. The film was revealed to be in development in June 2022, when Schreier and Pearson were attached. The main cast was revealed in September, with additional casting through early 2023. Lee Sung Jin joined to rewrite the script by March 2023, one of several creatives who returned to work with Schreier from the Netflix series Beef (2023–present). Production was delayed by the 2023 Hollywood labor disputes, causing some cast changes in early 2024. Calo joined by then for further rewrites. Filming took place from February to June 2024 at Trilith Studios and Atlanta Metro Studios in Atlanta, Georgia, and on location in Utah and Kuala Lumpur.

Thunderbolts* premiered on April 22, 2025, at the Cineworld Leicester Square in London, England, and was released in the United States on May 2 as the final film of Phase Five of the MCU. The meaning of the title's asterisk was the subject of commentary during marketing and was explained by the reveal at the end of the film that the Thunderbolts team is rebranded as the "New Avengers"; the title is changed to The New Avengers during the end credits and in some post-release marketing. The film received positive reviews from critics—with praise for its approach to mental health and the performances of Pugh and Pullman—and several accolades. It underperformed at the box office, grossing $382.4 million.

== Plot ==
In Kuala Lumpur, Yelena Belova destroys a laboratory on behalf of CIA director Valentina Allegra de Fontaine, who is attempting to destroy any evidence of her involvement with the O.X.E. Group's "Project Sentry". As de Fontaine faces imminent impeachment for her work with the O.X.E. Group, she dispatches Yelena, John Walker, Ava Starr, and Antonia Dreykov—all operatives who have worked for her—to a covert O.X.E. facility with orders to kill each other. In the ensuing fight, Ava kills Antonia while an amnesiac man named Bob is released from a suspended animation pod in the room. After realizing that they were sent by de Fontaine to be incinerated along with any evidence of her misconduct, they work together to escape from the trap. Upon coming into physical contact with Bob, Yelena and Walker briefly experience visions of some of their worst memories.

De Fontaine learns that the group has survived and that Bob was a presumed-dead volunteer in the Sentry trials. When she arrives at the site, Bob creates a diversion by drawing enemy fire, allowing Yelena, Walker, and Ava to escape. Bob sustains no injuries upon being shot, uncontrollably ascends into the air, crash-lands back at the compound, and is captured and transported to the former Avengers Tower in Manhattan, now renamed the "Watchtower". De Fontaine intends to introduce Bob to the press as a superpowered protector akin to the Avengers, hoping the PR stunt will avert her impeachment. Meanwhile, Yelena's father-figure Alexei Shostakov, who overheard details of de Fontaine's plot while working as a freelance chauffeur, rescues Yelena, Walker, and Ava. Walker refers to the group as the "Thunderbolts", inspired by Yelena's childhood soccer team.

Congressman Bucky Barnes is tipped off about what has happened by de Fontaine's assistant Mel. He captures the Thunderbolts and intends to have them testify in the impeachment proceedings. When Mel expresses concern about Bob, Barnes takes the group to New York City to infiltrate the Watchtower. The Thunderbolts discover that de Fontaine has convinced Bob to join her and become the superhero "Sentry". Bob easily overpowers the Thunderbolts, but he ignores de Fontaine's order to kill them and allows them to retreat, believing that they are not a threat to him. Developing a god-like delusion of superiority, Bob turns on de Fontaine and is incapacitated by Mel using a failsafe kill switch. This triggers the emergence of the Void, Bob's destructive alter ego and the embodiment of his depression and insecurities which have been amplified by the Sentry procedure. The Void begins to engulf New York City in supernatural darkness, trapping its citizens in visions of their own traumatic memories.

Realizing that the only way to stop the Void is from within, Yelena enters the darkness to reach Bob's consciousness. She faces her haunted past as a Black Widow, and finds Bob hiding in a recreation of his childhood bedroom where he hid from his abusive father. The other Thunderbolts join them, and together they face off with Bob's various traumas and drug addiction until they reach his memory of the Sentry procedure in the Kuala Lumpur laboratory. They find the Void and are swiftly overpowered. Bob's attempts to fight back threaten to consume him completely, until the Thunderbolts hug Bob and affirm their belief in him, empowering him to regain control and overcome the Void. Light returns to the city and the victims are freed. With the threat of the Void neutralized, the Thunderbolts prepare to apprehend de Fontaine, but she manipulates public perception by staging a press conference in which she introduces the team as the New Avengers and takes credit for their actions. The group goes along with the announcement, but Yelena quietly tells de Fontaine "we own you now."

In a post-credits scene set fourteen months later, the New Avengers and Bob discuss a growing feud with Sam Wilson, who has his own Avengers team and is suing the New Avengers for trademark infringement. There is also an ongoing problem in outer space, and the group are interrupted when the Watchtower detects the arrival of an extra-dimensional spacecraft that has a large "4" emblem on the side. (Note: This scene was directed by Anthony and Joe Russo during production on the film Avengers: Doomsday (2026). The spacecraft was identified off-screen as belonging to the Fantastic Four from the alternate reality Earth-828.)

== Cast ==
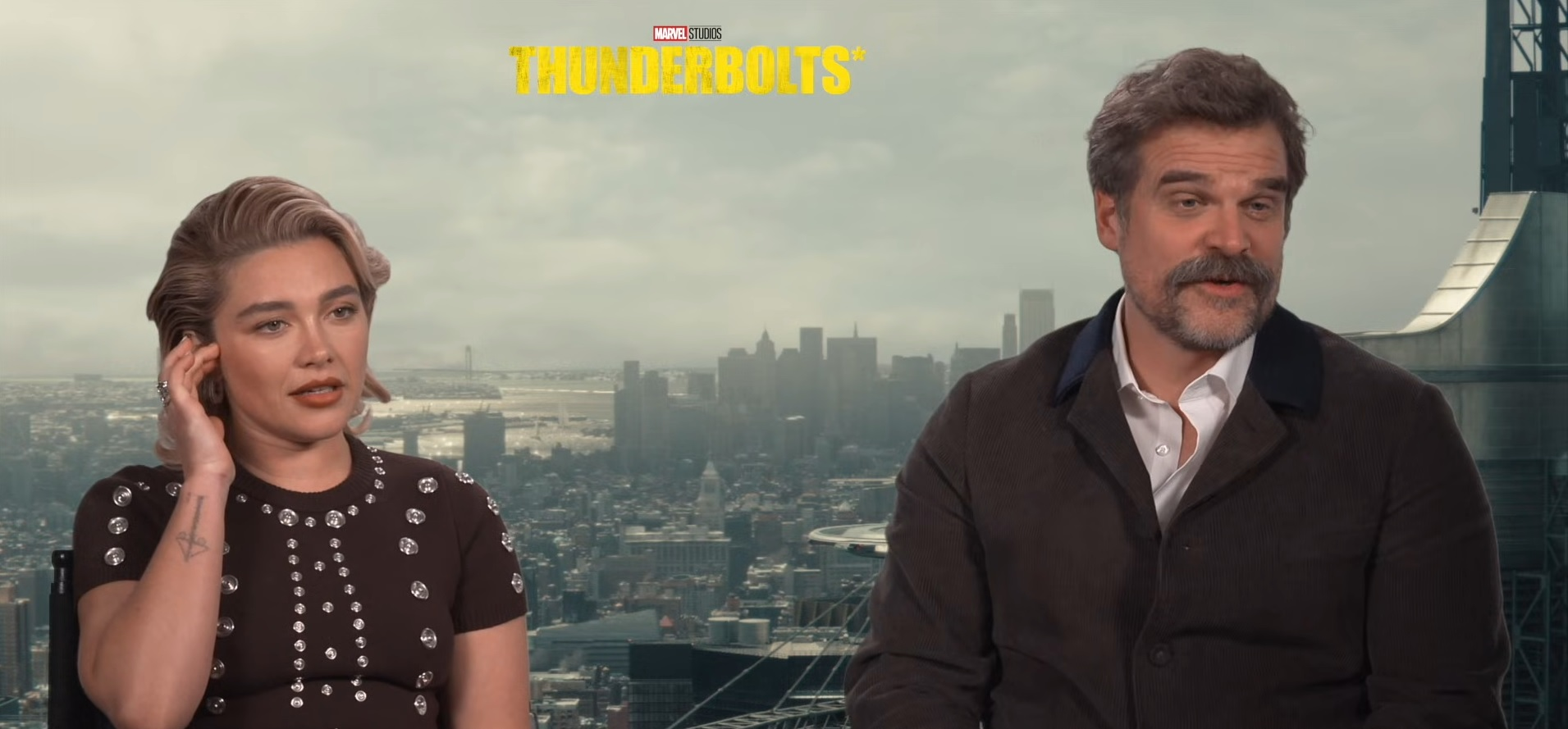
Florence Pugh (left) and David Harbour (right) co-star in the film, which further explores the relationship between their characters Yelena Belova and Alexei Shostakov.

- Florence Pugh as Yelena Belova:
  A member of the Thunderbolts who was trained in the Red Room as a Black Widow assassin. Pugh said the character has been affected by the traumatic events of recent Marvel Cinematic Universe (MCU) projects, including the death of her sister Natasha Romanoff / Black Widow in the film Avengers: Endgame (2019). Co-writer Eric Pearson explained that while the loss of Romanoff was addressed, there was not more looking to the past to "push forward" to give Yelena a "big leadership role moving forward". Pugh was shocked by the reveal that the Thunderbolts would be known as the New Avengers, and believed Yelena being a part of that team was "probably keeping her alive", giving her purpose with a family unit that relied on her and "allowed her to feel loved again". Violet McGraw reprises her role as a young Yelena from the film Black Widow (2021).
- Sebastian Stan as Bucky Barnes / Winter Soldier:
  An enhanced super soldier with a cybernetic arm who is the de facto leader of the Thunderbolts. Presumed killed in action during World War II, he reemerged in the present day as a brainwashed assassin before his programming was removed, and has since been elected as a member of the United States House of Representatives. Pearson said Barnes was originally written to be "kind of a [political] lobbyist" who helped politicians "propagandize", making it seem as though the character had fallen from grace until it is revealed that he was doing that to investigate de Fontaine. After Pearson finished his work on the film, Feige suggested that Barnes should be a congressman instead. Stan compared Barnes to Jack Nicholson's character Randle McMurphy in the film One Flew Over the Cuckoo's Nest (1975), saying they were both coming into a chaotic and degenerate group whose members need to be united.
- Wyatt Russell as John Walker / U.S. Agent:
  An enhanced super soldier and member of the Thunderbolts. He is a former decorated Captain of the U.S. Army Rangers who was chosen by the U.S. government to become Steve Rogers's successor as Captain America before receiving an other than honorable discharge in the Disney+ miniseries The Falcon and the Winter Soldier (2021).
- Olga Kurylenko as Antonia Dreykov / Taskmaster:
  A scarred assassin with photographic reflexes that allow her to mimic opponents' fighting styles. She was formerly controlled by her father, Dreykov, to complete missions for the Red Room before being freed by Romanoff in Black Widow.
- Lewis Pullman as Robert "Bob" Reynolds / Sentry / Void:
  A former drug addict with mental health issues who developed superpowers after being injected with a version of the Super Soldier Serum as part of the O.X.E. Group's "Project Sentry", of which he is the only test subject to survive the procedure. He is believed to be stronger than all of the Avengers combined, possessing abilities such as flight, superhuman strength and speed, invulnerability, and telekinesis. Bob has an alter ego known as the Void, who is completely shrouded in shadows and has glowing eyes. When in control, the Void is invincible, spreads darkness, and can turn people into shadows, sending them to a dimension of his own creation where they experience their worst fears and memories. Bob's mental health character arc was based on the experiences of a friend of director Jake Schreier, who stated that the Void's powers were inspired by images of the shadows left after the atomic bombing of Hiroshima in 1945. Having recently played Lt. Robert "Bob" Floyd in the film Top Gun: Maverick (2022), Pullman asked Schreier if the character could be addressed "Robert" instead of "Bob" to avoid repetition, but the filmmaker explained its importance in the source material; Pullman grew to like the name.
- Geraldine Viswanathan as Mel:
  Valentina Allegra de Fontaine's assistant, who Viswanathan described as de Fontaine's "little right-hand [woman]". Mel was in high school when the Avengers first assembled in the film The Avengers (2012). Viswanathan related to Mel's inner struggle with her moral compass, specifically "her optimism in entering the workforce, how your idealism can get challenged, and how it can be more difficult than you think to be a force of good in the world."
- Chris Bauer as Holt: A security officer for the O.X.E. Group
- Wendell Pierce as Gary: A Congressman who is resolute on impeaching de Fontaine.
- David Harbour as Alexei Shostakov / Red Guardian:
  A member of the Thunderbolts who is the Russian super soldier counterpart to Captain America and a father-figure to Yelena. Harbour said the film further explores the complex relationship between Shostakov and Yelena that was introduced in Black Widow. He noted that Yelena cannot stand Shostakov, but she needs someone to help her feel complete, and Shostakov fills that role.
- Hannah John-Kamen as Ava Starr / Ghost:
  A member of the Thunderbolts who can phase through objects. John-Kamen said the film shows a different side of the character following her introduction in the film Ant-Man and the Wasp (2018), with Ghost no longer in a constant state of molecular disequilibrium and able to control her powers with calmness and decisiveness.
- Julia Louis-Dreyfus as Valentina Allegra de Fontaine:
  A contessa and the director of the CIA, who brings together the members of the Thunderbolts. The film establishes de Fontaine as the one who bought Avengers Tower, now referred to as the "Watchtower", from Tony Stark in the film Spider-Man: Homecoming (2017). Louis-Dreyfus described de Fontaine as someone who is "after power, control, and just generally she wants to kick ass in the Marvel Universe". She added that the loss of power was her greatest weakness, saying, "She doesn't realize, number one, she doesn't have it, and number two, she doesn't necessarily need it. But for her, the loss of power is a devastating notion and unacceptable." Louis-Dreyfus felt it was a "very happy surprise" exploring de Fontaine's backstory in the film, during an encounter with the Void, where she relives witnessing her father's death, hence giving an understanding to where she came from. She felt de Fontaine was an "open wound" during that moment and had no control over it. Chiara Stella portrays a young Valentina during a flashback sequence.

Additionally, Gabrielle Byndloss reprises her role as Walker's wife Olivia from The Falcon and the Winter Soldier.

== Production ==
=== Development ===
During the production of the Marvel Cinematic Universe (MCU) film Guardians of the Galaxy (2014), director James Gunn expressed interest in making a film based on the Marvel Comics team Thunderbolts, a group of "anti-heroes and super-criminals". Marvel Studios president Kevin Feige said this was a possibility based on the success of Guardians of the Galaxy. By May 2021, Gunn was no longer interested in the idea after directing the DC Extended Universe (DCEU) film The Suicide Squad (2021), because that team from DC Comics is based on a similar concept to the Thunderbolts. In June 2018, Hannah John-Kamen expressed enthusiasm for reprising her role as Ava Starr / Ghost from the MCU film Ant-Man and the Wasp (2018) in a potential Thunderbolts film, considering the comics version of Ghost is a member of the team.

Speculation that a Thunderbolts team would be introduced to the MCU began in mid-2019 following the announcement that Daniel Brühl would appear as Helmut Zemo in the Disney+ series The Falcon and the Winter Soldier (2021), reprising his role from the MCU film Captain America: Civil War (2016). That series introduced Julia Louis-Dreyfus as Valentina Allegra de Fontaine and shows her recruiting Wyatt Russell's John Walker / U.S. Agent. De Fontaine is also shown to be working with Florence Pugh's Yelena Belova in the post-credits scene of the MCU film Black Widow (2021). Commentators speculated that she was recruiting a team of villains or antiheroes like the Thunderbolts, and some felt that team could appear in The Falcon and the Winter Soldier. Executive producer Nate Moore said the Thunderbolts were never considered for the project because they would "cloud the story" and take away from other aspects of the series. Head writer Malcolm Spellman said there was "a lot of chatter" around the team's potential introduction to the MCU and added, "I don't know if fans are crazy or not".

Concept art released at the D23 Expo in September 2022, depicting the main characters in costume: (left to right) Julia Louis-Dreyfus's Valentina Allegra de Fontaine, Hannah John-Kamen's Ava Starr / Ghost, David Harbour's Alexei Shostakov / Red Guardian, Florence Pugh's Yelena Belova, Sebastian Stan's Bucky Barnes / Winter Soldier, Wyatt Russell's John Walker / U.S. Agent, and Olga Kurylenko's Antonia Dreykov / Taskmaster

Following his work on Black Widow, writer Eric Pearson brought the idea of a Thunderbolts film to Marvel Studios, realizing that Pugh had the potential to headline the film, given that Yelena was "a natural leader". He was drawn to the story potential of her leading the Thunderbolts to go up against de Fontaine. Because he planned to center the story on Yelena, Pearson decided to include her father Alexei Shostakov / Red Guardian on the team, while also including Ghost because he had wanted to write the character. Bucky Barnes / Winter Soldier was also added to the team after a few drafts. The roster for the team eventually became Yelena, Shostakov, Ghost, Barnes, Walker, and Antonia Dreykov / Taskmaster, with the character Bob Reynolds / Sentry added shortly after; this roster stayed consistent through subsequent drafts. To choose the team members, the creatives had looked through the roster of MCU characters to find "not just bad guys who could be good but characters that exist more on that morally grey plane or who were potentially destined for something else but then something went awry". Pearson likened Yelena to Michael Corleone and Barnes to Tom Hagen, characters from Mario Puzo's novel The Godfather (1969). In some of the initial drafts, Pearson included Bill Foster / Goliath to continue his relationship with Ghost from Ant-Man and the Wasp, before joining the team by the end of the film. He was ultimately removed from the film, however, partly because Foster "didn't have the same background trauma that these other characters had, which was the unifying theme".

By June 2022, Jake Schreier was attached to direct Thunderbolts, from a screenplay by Pearson, with Feige producing. Schreier was hired after a presentation that "blew away" Marvel Studios executives. At that time, the studio had been in contact with actors to discuss their availability to reprise their roles for the film. Schreier had considered including Man-Thing as a member of the team while pitching for the film, who Pearson called "an unpredictable creature" explaining that they could not find a way to have his inclusion make sense for the story in part because the character was drawing visual and narrative attention away from Bob. Another core concept that stayed consistent from the early drafts was the members being sent to kill each other, which Schreier believed provided a "neat twist" for audiences expecting Marvel Studios' version of the Suicide Squad; Pearson also believed it was important for Thunderbolts not to "rehash" the story beats of that team – an authority figure forcing criminals to work together – since audiences would have been familiar with that from the DCEU film Suicide Squad (2016) and its sequel The Suicide Squad. Thus it did not make sense for the film to include Zemo or Thaddeus Ross, the leaders who had formed the team in the comics, despite Schreier wanting to try to incorporate Zemo. Pearson said the two characters' inclusion was discussed to consider whether it made sense narratively, as it would have honored the comics, but they would not have featured if it was only for fan service. Zemo was included in an early post-credits scene idea where he would have been seen in prison "pulling the strings" similar to Keyser Söze, the antagonist in the film The Usual Suspects (1995), but this was quickly moved on from. The film was officially announced in July at San Diego Comic-Con (SDCC), with a release date of July 26, 2024. It was set to be the last film in Phase Five of the MCU.

=== Pre-production ===
In September 2022, Justin Kroll of Deadline Hollywood described the film as a spin-off for Yelena because she was expected to lead the antihero team, with Pugh and Russell believed to be reprising their roles, along with the inclusion of Brühl. At the D23 Expo later that month, Pugh, Russell, John-Kamen, and Louis-Dreyfus were confirmed to star, alongside Sebastian Stan as Barnes, David Harbour as Red Guardian, and Olga Kurylenko as Taskmaster, all reprising their roles from previous MCU projects. Pugh was set to be paid eight figures for Thunderbolts and another MCU film. Prior to the cast announcement for the team, commentators had also suggested it could have included characters such as Emil Blonsky / Abomination or Clint Barton / Hawkeye. Schreier compared the character dynamics to those in the films Reservoir Dogs (1992), Ronin (1998), and Mission: Impossible – Ghost Protocol (2011), which are all about a "mis-matched team forced to work together". He also pointed to a less-likely inspiration in the film Toy Story 3 (2010), saying the Thunderbolts members are all facing obsolescence like the Toy Story characters are in that film. Harbour said the film would be unique in the MCU, describing the main cast as "a bunch of misfits and outcasts and losers and people who don't really live up to the super in superhero". Pugh said the joy of uniting these characters was that they "don't play well together", while Russell expressed confidence that the film would be interesting, fun, and not a "straightforward" Marvel film. Journalist Jeff Sneider reported that Pearson's script focused too much on the characters returning from Black Widow, which he also wrote, and Marvel Studios was looking for the other characters to have a more equitable role so it would feel like an ensemble film. Schreier did not believe the film was a Black Widow sequel but rather "a sampling of people from different parts" of the MCU, acknowledging the writers pulled from all of their histories, including Yelena and Shostakov's relationship that was established in Black Widow. One of Pearson's drafts started the film with a scene of Yelena confronting de Fontaine about sending her to kill Barton, furthering the storyline that was established in the post-credits scene of Black Widow and continued in the Disney+ series Hawkeye (2021); Pearson said their confrontation helped emphasize de Fontaine's manipulation but ultimately was not relevant to the larger story being told.

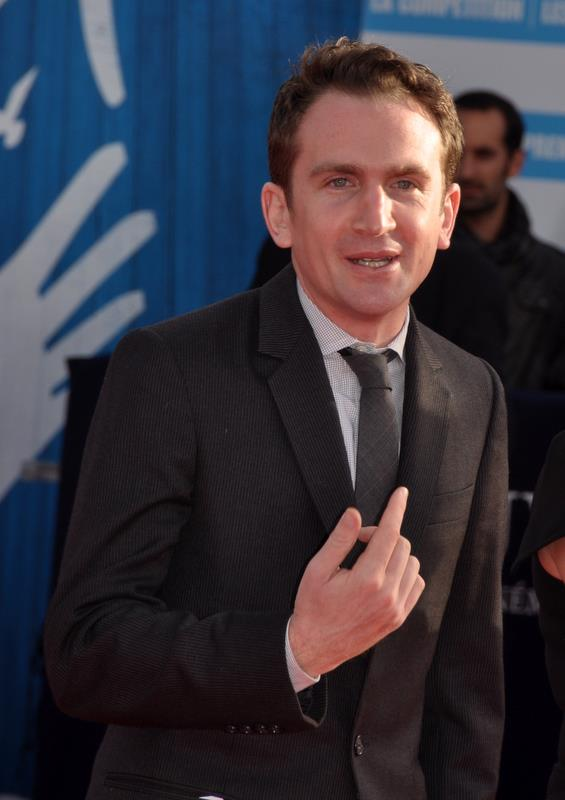
Director Jake Schreier brought back several crew members from his television series Beef to work on Thunderbolts*; both projects explore mental health issues.

Ayo Edebiri joined the cast in January 2023 as de Fontaine's assistant Mel, when Louis-Dreyfus said filming would begin that June. In February, Steven Yeun was cast as Sentry with the potential to continue in future MCU films. Yeun worked with Schreier on the Netflix series Beef (2023–present), and the director had the actor in mind when adding the character. The next month, Beef creator Lee Sung Jin revealed that he was rewriting the script at Schreier's request and said there were "a lot of themes and exciting things" that drew him to the project. He worked closely with Schreier on the script and noted that, unlike Beef, Thunderbolts was Schreier's project and had different writing needs than the series, given the film's large scope and scale. With the team largely consistent, Schreier worked in subsequent drafts to "go deeper" with the characters "on the margins" such as Mel and Congressman Gary and "[tying] their arcs together into something that would feel resonant".

At the start of May 2023, filming was delayed due to the 2023 Writers Guild of America strike and was planned to resume after the strike concluded. In June, the release date was pushed back to December 20, 2024, and the Utah Film Commission announced that Thunderbolts would film in Emery County and Grand County, Utah, spending over $4.5 million in the state. Chapek said the "grounded, globe-trotting film" would use several practical filming locations and the Utah locations were chosen because they felt "untouched by the larger world". Sanja Milkovic Hays was the costume designer after working on the MCU films Captain Marvel (2019) and Spider-Man: No Way Home (2021). When the 2023 SAG-AFTRA strike ended in November, the release date was pushed back again, this time to July 25, 2025. Upon returning from the strike, Schreier and the creatives were able to reexamine the script. They determined that there was no sense of "tension and unpredictability", and the film felt "bloodless" when there should be the tension of not knowing who would survive, given who these characters are. To solve this, they decided to rework Taskmaster's involvement in the film, killing the character "early and dry" in the film to have her death "resonate" and inform the fates of the other characters throughout the rest of the film. Having the death occur later in the film was also discussed, but Schreier said the sadness from it would "hang over" the rest of the film and distract from the intended storyline of forming a strong bond between Yelena and Bob. In Pearson's original draft, Taskmaster survived until the end and had a sub-plot where she bonded with Ghost, as well as a recurring joke where she kept forgetting she had made friends with the other characters and was still trying to assassinate Walker because of her memory loss. Pearson understood why the decision was made to kill Taskmaster, also believing the memory loss assassination joke drifted too close to Bob's arc as he also was dealing with memory loss. Additionally, his post-credit scene featuring Kang the Conqueror was abandoned because Marvel Studios had decided to move away from that storyline.

Following the strike-caused production delays, filming was slated to begin around March or April 2024. Yeun exited in January 2024 due to a scheduling issue caused by the delayed production, but expressed interest in working on a future MCU film. It was unclear if Marvel would recast or rethink Yeun's role, but at the end of the month Lewis Pullman was revealed to be the studios' top choice to replace Yeun as Sentry, and his casting was soon confirmed. Geraldine Viswanathan was cast to replace Edebiri as Mel after she exited due to the delays. In February, the release date was moved forward to May 2, 2025, swapping places with the MCU film The Fantastic Four: First Steps. By the end of the month, Joanna Calo had joined to serve as the writer during production and was rewriting the script. For the film's final writing credits, Pearson was credited for the story and received a screenplay credit alongside Calo, while additional off-screen literary material was attributed to Lee.

The script explores mental health, specifically loneliness and depression, particularly with Bob / Sentry. Pearson always envisioned ending the film with the emotional moment of giving someone a hug rather than fighting them. Before Sentry was added to the film, Walker was intended to be the main antagonist, with de Fontaine manipulating him into believing his super soldier serum was wearing off and giving him pills as a solution, making him into a "time bomb" that made him more unlikable and "the monster". Pearson said this version "didn't ever totally work", and Walker's actions felt too similar to the plot line of Thaddeus Ross becoming the Red Hulk in the MCU film Captain America: Brave New World (2025); Pearson had considered Red Hulk for the film's villain early in the process, which Marvel Studios declined because of their intended plans for Brave New World. Looking for a new antagonist that would not easily be beatable in a fight, Pearson remembered reading the Sentry miniseries years prior and felt Sentry and his alter ego the Void would work for "heroic ambition and self-esteem versus depression and self-loathing and loneliness and isolation"; he called Sentry "the entire journey for our heroes rolled into one entity" and his inclusion helped make the story cohesive. Pearson was glad he was able to incorporate many elements of the character's comics backstory to fit into the MCU. Said backstory, consisting of Sentry erasing himself from the world's memories to stop the Void, was avoided because it was similar to the plot of No Way Home, in which Peter Parker / Spider-Man also has himself erased from memory. Paul Jenkins, co-creator of Sentry, discussed the character with the creatives, with Schreier calling Sentry and the work Jenkins did with the character "a parable for mental health". Schreier explained that Lee felt mental health discussion was "not niche anymore" and it allowed them to "tell a story about that internality and still have a lot of comedy and action for something that feels big and universal".

The Thunderbolts* team believed the film was a good opportunity to further explore ideas they had started to explore in Beef on a larger scale. Executive producer Brian Chapek came up with the idea that, to defeat Sentry, the Thunderbolts would have to enter the Void, which manifested memories of their greatest shame, dubbed "shame rooms". Lee worked closely with production designer Grace Yun, who also served that role on Beef, to create the initial specifics of each room. Pearson had originally envisioned them as "ethereal and dreamy" but believed making them mazes akin to those seen in the film Being John Malkovich (1999) helped with visualizing the concept and made them feel "more unsettling". Calo further enhanced the shame rooms, suggesting that when Yelena enters to Void to help Bob that she return to her initial room seen earlier in the film. Schreier explained that this made a "callback of the idea that the greatest shame of all was thinking that you could be something bigger than yourself, that [Bob's] aspirations towards heroism are actually what brings everything down and that you need to learn to be ok with who you are without that". Shame rooms for Yelena, Walker, and de Fontaine are visible, with rooms for the other characters conceived for the film's finale, allowing the team to escape through them. However, Calo felt strongly that to journey to the heart of the Void, there needed to be a "Big Bad moment" beforehand, and the team should journey through Bob's shame rooms. The other shame rooms included: Shostakov being thrown in the gulag; Ghost growing up in an orphanage with no one wanting to be around her; and multiple different ones for Bucky that were "a little less than the expected idea", including a "shameful moment" in the Boy Scouts.

Schreier had suggested during his pitch meeting that one of the film's posters or trailers should use an asterisk in the title to imply they needed to "come up with something better"; Feige, Marvel Studios co-president Louis D'Esposito, and the marketing team loved this idea and decided to fully embrace it for the title and marketing campaign; with the film formally retitled to Thunderbolts* by March 2024. This allowed the creatives to realize that having the asterisk could lead to the reveal of a new title for the film once it was released, which was subsequently done, changing the title to The New Avengers after the ending reveals the Thunderbolts to be the New Avengers. Schreier said the ending was always going to have the Thunderbolts revealed as the New Avengers team, and the rest of the film became about "building the right story that lived up to that". Pearson explained that Feige suggesting de Fontaine should introduce the Thunderbolts to the public as the Avengers; additional discussions were had on what this meant, such as if the "n" in "new" should be upper or lowercase, and what the implications of each decision would mean. Thunderbolts* included "little hints" throughout so the ending did not come as a total surprise – such as the Battle of New York gala, Avengers Tower becoming the Watchtower, and Mel explaining how she was in high school when the Avengers first formed. Additionally, the credits and the post-credit sequences acknowledge that the New Avengers is "not necessarily the most comfortable or perfect fit" for these characters. The original Thunderbolts name was derived from Yelena's youth soccer team.

=== Filming ===
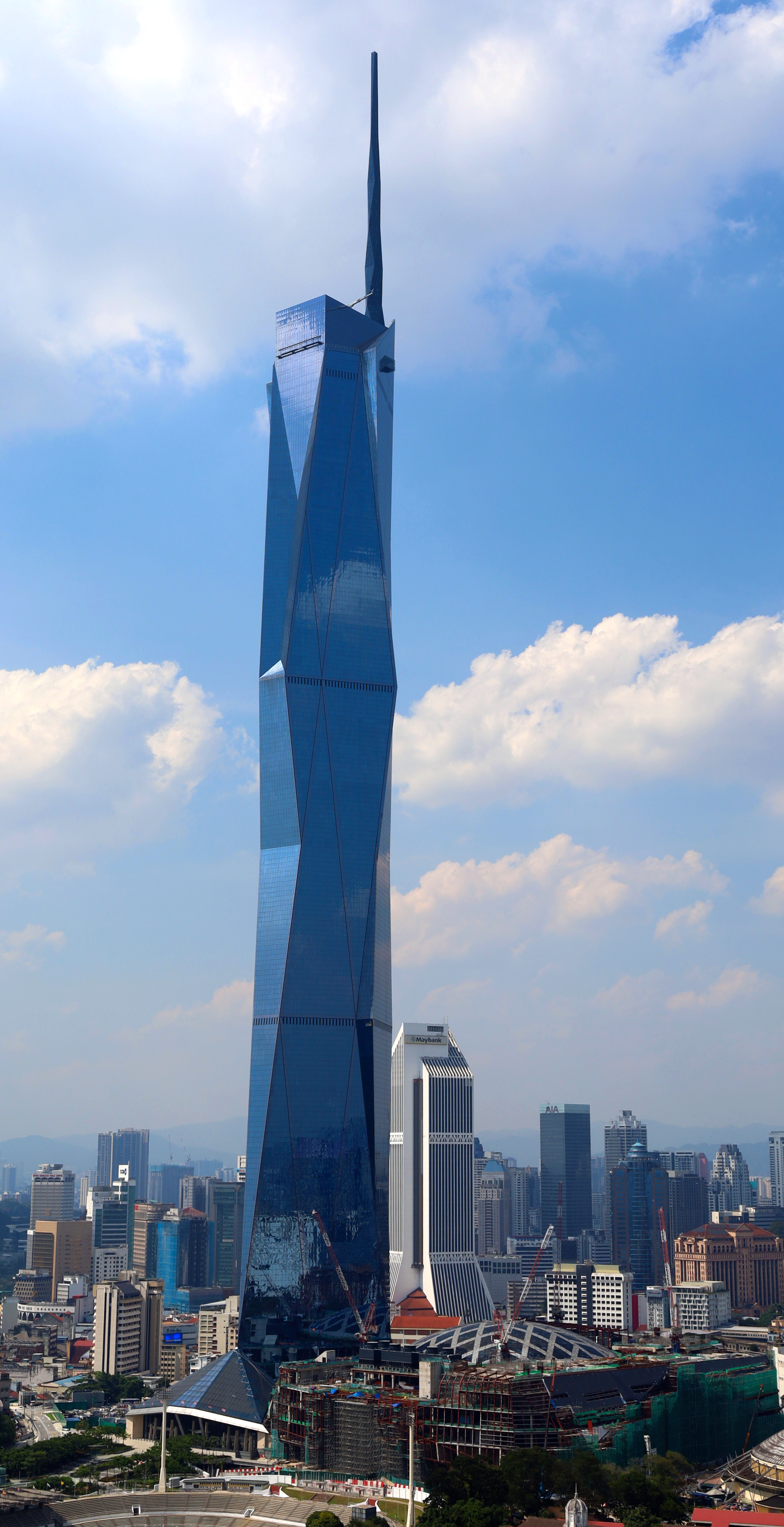
Star Florence Pugh jumped off of the Merdeka 118 skyscraper for the film's opening sequence.

Filming was originally scheduled to begin in mid-June 2023 and last for six months. It was initially not expected to be impacted by the writers' strike, with Marvel Studios reportedly planning to shoot what they could during principal photography and make any necessary writing adjustments during already scheduled reshoots. Filming was ultimately delayed by the writers' strike and subsequent SAG-AFTRA strike. The original filming schedule overlapped with Stan's work on the film The Apprentice (2024), for which he gained weight to portray Donald Trump. He had begun the physical transformation needed to portray Barnes when the strikes began and he had to reverse course. Harbour planned to shoot the film concurrently with his scenes as Jim Hopper for the fifth season of Stranger Things (2025), also in Atlanta; that production was also delayed by the strikes.

Principal photography began by February 26, 2024, at Trilith Studios and Atlanta Metro Studios in Atlanta, Georgia, under the working title Oops All Berries, which is a reference to a variation of the cereal Cap'n Crunch that only has berry-flavored pieces. Andrew Droz Palermo was the cinematographer, having previously worked on the Marvel Studios series Moon Knight (2022). He replaced Steve Yedlin who was originally intended to work on the film. The film was shot for IMAX. Filming occurred in Emery County and Grand County, Utah, from May 29 to June 12, 2024. Louis-Dreyfus completed her scenes by early June, and said Marvel Studios was trying to "go back to their roots" with a focus on the characters' humanity, practical stunt sequences, and avoiding visual effects where possible. Furthermore, Schreier intended for the film's fight scenes to look as realistic as possible, though a notable exception is the fight between the Thunderbolts and Sentry at the penthouse of the former Avengers Tower, now referred to as the "Watchtower", as both Schreier and the stunt team wanted to use this scene to emphasize the magnitude of Sentry's powers—something that required weeks of rehearsal and careful choreography by Pullman and stunt double Alec Back to be conveyed. Pullman stated that the fight "was a big [scene] because that really is where you get to see Sentry. It's a small window of real estate where you get to really demonstrate what Sentry is capable of."

Filming also took place at the Medan Pasar square and Merdeka 118 skyscraper in Kuala Lumpur, Malaysia. Pugh was insistent on filming the scene where Yelena jumps off the top of Merdeka 118 without the use of stunt doubles. Marvel Studios was initially reluctant to allow Pugh to perform the stunt for insurance reasons, but after continually pushing the matter, including to Feige, she was allowed to perform the jump. For Yelena's trip through the shame rooms to save Bob, Palermo used a "handheld, hand-made aesthetic" similar to indie films such as Being John Malkovich, Eternal Sunshine of the Spotless Mind (2004), and those produced by A24 such as Everything Everywhere All at Once (2022). Feige championed doing as many of the effects practically and in camera as possible and Schreier noted the creatives liked the idea of doing a "practical rendition of what getting stuck in a thought loop or a shame room would be". Filming concluded the week of June 19.

=== Post-production ===
In September 2024, Chris Bauer and Wendell Pierce were revealed to have been cast in the film, with Bauer playing Holt and Pierce playing Congressman Gary. The film's teaser trailer released that month revealed that Scarlett Johansson, who portrayed Natasha Romanoff / Black Widow in the MCU from 2010 to 2021, was credited as an executive producer. However, Johansson asked for her credit to be removed from the film because she had no involvement with it. In early December, additional photography took place in Atlanta, including to shoot the "Meth Chicken" shame room sequence from Bob's memories. Harry Yoon and Angela Catanzaro edited the film; Yoon previously worked on the MCU film Shang-Chi and the Legend of the Ten Rings (2021) and with Schreier on Beef. Jake Morrison is the visual effects supervisor, with visual effects provided by Industrial Light & Magic (ILM), Framestore, Digital Domain, Rising Sun Pictures (RSP), Raynault VFX, Base FX, Crafty Apes, and Mammal Studios.

Thunderbolts* includes a post-credits scene set 14 months after the end of the film where the New Avengers, discussing a problem in outer space, are notified of an extradimensional spacecraft entering Earth-616, which is revealed to be the Fantastic Four's. Schreier said this scene was filmed approximately a month before the release of Thunderbolts*, on the set of the MCU crossover film Avengers: Doomsday (2026) by its directors, the Russo brothers, and was intended for that film; Schreier was on set when the post-credits scene was filmed. Schreier helped conceive the scene while noting the characters were being given over to a "whole new world and new scope" to function in, and enjoyed seeing them "directed in another context and on a different level of scope" than had been done for this film. Pearson believed Calo had written the post-credits scene. It originally included a sequence that was cut where Barnes and Walker had a "Who's on First?"–style exchange about the ship having the number four on it. Stan called the bit "genius" and was sad it had been cut, with Russell saying the exchange became "a Leslie Nielsen sketch".

== Music ==
The band Son Lux began recording the score for Thunderbolts* at Abbey Road Studios in London in the first week of February 2025, after member Ryan Lott previously scored Schreier's film Paper Towns (2015). A soundtrack album featuring their music was released by Hollywood Records and Marvel Music on April 30, 2025.

== Marketing ==
External media

Images
- Thunderbolts* Wheaties poster is an additional poster for the film mimicking the cover of a Wheaties box, poster at IMP Awards

Video
- Title reveal motion poster is a motion version of the film's main poster showing the Thunderbolts* title being changed to The New Avengers, video via Marvel Studios' X (formerly known as Twitter) account

After filming had begun in March 2024, Pugh and Marvel Studios released a set video in which she showcased her new Black Widow costume and an updated logo for the film with Schreier. The new logo styled the title as "Thunderbolts* ". Kristen Lopez at TheWrap felt viewers would "start deconstructing the brief images she's shown immediately", while Sabina Graves of Gizmodo felt the video was delightful and a fun tease for a scene featuring Yelena. She highlighted Pugh's short hair and her joking with Schreier that they "really shouldn't be showing any of this". Collider's Chris McPherson also discussed Pugh's costume, calling it "very military [and] quite tactical", and noted her teal eyeliner. Several commentators questioned why there was an asterisk in the updated logo. The next month, Feige confirmed that Thunderbolts* was the official title and said the use of the asterisk would be explained following the film's release, which led to continued speculation as to its meaning. One theory suggested the team would not be called the Thunderbolts in the film, but rather a variation of the Avengers name such as the Dark Avengers or New Avengers. Another suggestion stated there was another Thunderbolts team in the MCU with characters more closely aligned to the rosters from the comics.

A behind-the-scenes look was shown at CineEurope in June 2024, while the first footage from the film was shown at SDCC the next month, presented by Schreier and the cast. Harbour dressed as Red Guardian for the panel. Following online leaks of the SDCC footage, Marvel released an official look at the Thunderbolts team within their video celebrating the company's 85th anniversary in August. A teaser trailer for the film was released in a month later, featuring the song "Where Is My Mind?" by the Pixies. Tom Power at TechRadar said the teaser was a longer and higher quality version of the previously leaked footage, and felt the film was "looking very good". He highlighted the characters' struggles with identity as well as the action and tone of the teaser. Writing for The A.V. Club, Mary Kate Carr noted the various mysteries surrounding the film—including the asterisk in its title—and said the teaser "valiantly" refused to give up any secrets or plot details. A second trailer was shown during Super Bowl LIX in February 2025. Commentators stated that the trailer appeared to confirm speculation that the titular team would be fighting the Void, the malevolent alter-ego of Bob / Sentry. In the trailer, Red Guardian expresses hope that the team's achievements would get them featured on the cover of Wheaties, a cereal known for putting sports figures on its boxes and the slogan "The Breakfast of Champions". Alongside the trailer, Marvel Studios released a poster for the film that mimicked a Wheaties box featuring the team. Their social media posts for the poster were captioned "The Breakfast of ~~Champions~~ Thunderbolts*". An asterisk-themed international poster was also released, which included a footnote for the title asterisk which says "The Avengers Are Not Available". Kieran Fisher at /Film questioned whether this was a joke, or if it was the true meaning behind the asterisk in the film's title. James Whitbrook of Gizmodo and Scott Collura from IGN both believed the footnote fit with the film's marketing approach of presenting the team as a ragtag humorous group of heroes, rather than the asterisk being an "actual serious mystery".

In March 2025, Letterboxd debuted a trailer for the film that is edited in the style of those for independent films produced by A24. It features techno music, an "A24-esque makeover" for the Marvel Studios logo, and title cards that highlight past A24 projects that the film's cast and crew members worked on. Schreier helped conceive the trailer, which was released around the same time Pugh described the film as an "indie, A24-feeling assassin movie with Marvel superheroes". Zosha Millman from Polygon said Marvel had "film buffs in mind" when releasing the trailer through Letterboxd. Despite the creative pedigree touted by the trailer, she thought Thunderbolts* would still be "largely what you expect" of a Marvel film. A24 was not aware of the trailer before its release and responded on social media with a meme from its HBO drama series Euphoria (2019–2026). Later in March, Marvel Studios announced that many MCU cast members would be reprising their roles for Doomsday, including Stan, Russell, Pugh, Pullman, Harbour, and John-Kamen. Commentators discussed whether this announcement, which seemingly revealed characters who survive the film's events and aligned with speculation that Taskmaster would die early in the story due to limited presence in trailers, was a spoiler. Michael Walsh at Nerdist criticized the announcement, feeling it had undermined one of the key reasons some people were interested in Thunderbolts*, which was the feeling that any of the main cast could die. He compared this to spoiling who survives the events of the film The Dirty Dozen (1967), and said Marvel should have excluded the Thunderbolts* cast members from the Doomsday announcement. Amelia Emberwing of IGN said "knowing who makes it out alive [does not matter] much in a comic book franchise" and also felt the announcement was not necessarily a spoiler because the returning actors could be playing versions of their characters from other universes within the multiverse.

Various fan screenings occurred on April 22, 2025, in 10 major cities across the U.S. At the end of April, Marvel announced a collaboration with Wheaties to create a limited edition box of the cereal, mimicking the Wheaties-inspired poster for the film. The film's marketing campaign was valued between $75–100 million, and featured partnerships with Harley-Davidson, Tide, Wheaties, Mike and Ike, Cupra Kiro with Formula E racing, LinkedIn, Perfect Sports, and Arizona Beverage Company.

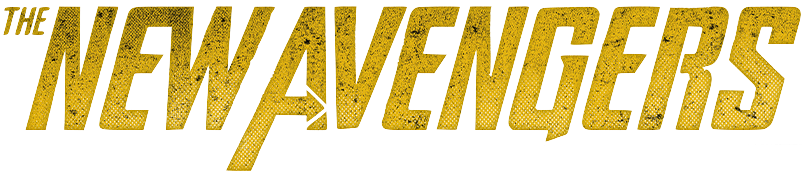
The New Avengers logo

Following the film's opening weekend, Marvel Studios rebranded the film as The New Avengers. The studio released a video of the cast tearing away the Thunderbolts* logo from the poster to reveal The New Avengers, billboards and theater marquees were also updated to The New Avengers, and new posters were released. Schreier explained that revealing and embracing the updated title felt like it was part of the studio's plan and had been built up to since the asterisk was first included in the film's title. Disney clarified that the film was not formally retitled, just that the asterisk was "spelled out", and ticketing services still listed the film as Thunderbolts*, despite featuring the updated posters with the New Avengers name. Sydney Bucksbaum of Entertainment Weekly felt this was the first instance a film "planned in advance to change its title a few days after its release for narrative purposes".

== Release ==
=== Theatrical ===
Thunderbolts* had its European premiere on April 22, 2025, at the Cineworld Leicester Square, London, and its Los Angeles premiere on April 28, 2025. The film was released in the United States on May 2, in IMAX, Dolby Cinema, RealD 3D, ScreenX, and 4DX. It was previously scheduled for July 26, 2024, December 20, 2024, and July 25, 2025. It is the final film of Phase Five of the MCU.

=== Home media ===
Thunderbolts* was released for digital download on July 1, 2025, and on Ultra HD Blu-ray, Blu-ray, and DVD on July 29. The home media releases, all bearing the title Thunderbolts* (The New Avengers), include two deleted scenes, a gag reel, director's commentary, and featurettes. The film was released on Disney+ on August 27.

In the United Kingdom, Thunderbolts* debuted at No. 2 on the Official Film Chart for the week ending July 9. Three weeks later, for the week ending July 30, the film ranked No. 8. It then rose to No. 6 for the week ending August 6, up from No. 8 the previous week. Thunderbolts* reached No. 1 for the week ending August 13, rising from No. 6. The film retained the top spot for the following week ending August 20. For the week ending August 27, it moved to No. 3. The film ranked No. 10 for the week ending September 3, moving down from No. 3 the previous week.

In the United States, Thunderbolts* placed tenth on Fandango at Home's digital sales and rentals chart for 2025 and ranked fourth on the platform's Top 5 Action Movies of 2025 list. On physical media, Thunderbolts* debuted at No. 1 on the Circana VideoScan combined DVD and Blu-ray sales chart, as well as the dedicated Blu-ray and 4K Ultra HD charts, for the week ended August 2. High-definition formats accounted for 74% of first-week sales, with 35% from regular Blu-ray and 39% from 4K Ultra HD editions. The film remained at No. 1 on the Circana VideoScan combined DVD and Blu-ray chart and the dedicated Blu-ray chart for the week ended August 9. In its second week, high-definition formats accounted for 62% of total unit sales, with 43% from regular Blu-ray (up 8 points from the first week) and 19% from 4K Ultra HD editions (down 20 points), causing it to move to No. 2 on the 4K Ultra HD disc chart. For the week ended August 16, Thunderbolts* moved to No. 3 on the combined DVD and Blu-ray chart after two weeks at No. 1, while remaining No. 2 on both the dedicated Blu-ray and 4K Ultra HD charts. High-definition formats accounted for 74% of total unit sales that week, with 35% from regular Blu-ray and 39% from 4K Ultra HD editions. Through October 2025, the film ranked fourth in year-to-date disc sales on Circana's chart. It ranked fifth on the Top Selling Titles on Disc (DVD and Blu-ray combined) of 2025, according to Circana. Thunderbolts* recorded a sales index of 38.03 relative to the year's top-selling title. Blu-ray formats accounted for 68% of total unit sales, including a 30% share from 4K Ultra HD. The film also placed fourth on the Top Selling Blu-ray Discs of 2025 and tenth on the Top Selling 4K Ultra HD Blu-rays of 2025.

Streaming analytics firm FlixPatrol, which monitors daily updated VOD charts and streaming ratings across the globe, reported that Thunderbolts* became the most-streamed film on Disney+ in the U.S. and the third most-streamed worldwide after one day of release. Analytics company Samba TV, which gathers viewership data from certain smart TVs and content providers, stated it was watched by approximately 449,000 households during its first six days on digital platforms. Nielsen Media Research, which records streaming viewership on certain U.S. television screens, announced that Thunderbolts* was streamed for 702 million minutes from August 25–31, making it the third most-streamed film of the week. In the following week, from September 1–7, it recorded 368 million minutes of viewing time, placing fifth among films.

== Reception ==
=== Box office ===
Thunderbolts* grossed $190.3 million in the United States and Canada, and $192.2 million in other territories, for a worldwide total of $382.4 million. It is one of the lowest grossing MCU films. Rebecca Rubin at Variety reported that the film needed to earn an "unachievable" $425 million worldwide to break-even, based on "slightly cheaper" than usual costs for an MCU film: the production budget was $180 million and the marketing budget was $100 million. Rubin and Brent Lang said Thunderbolts* and the other two 2025 MCU films, Brave New World and First Steps, were all "commercial duds" and part of a "lousy streak" for Marvel Studios. Feige attributed the low box office performance to audiences believing they needed to watch the MCU's Disney+ series in order to understand the film; he felt the studio should have better explained that this was not necessary.

In mid-April 2025, Thunderbolts* was projected to have a $63–77 million opening weekend in the United States, with the "target number" expected to be $70 million. By the end of the month, the film was projected to earn $70–75 million domestically and $160–175 million globally on its opening weekend, with some domestic projections going as high as $80–90 million. The film earned $31.5 million domestically in its opening day, including $11.5 million from Thursday night previews. The film would gross $74.3 million in its domestic opening weekend, while also earning $86.1 million internationally for a total of $160.1 million, including $20 million from IMAX screenings. In its second weekend the film made $33.1 million, remaining atop the box office. The 55% drop was noted as good for an MCU film, compared to the 68% second weekend decrease by Brave New World earlier that year. It made $17 million on its third weekend, a drop of 52%, and it dropped to second behind the new release of Final Destination Bloodlines.

=== Critical response ===
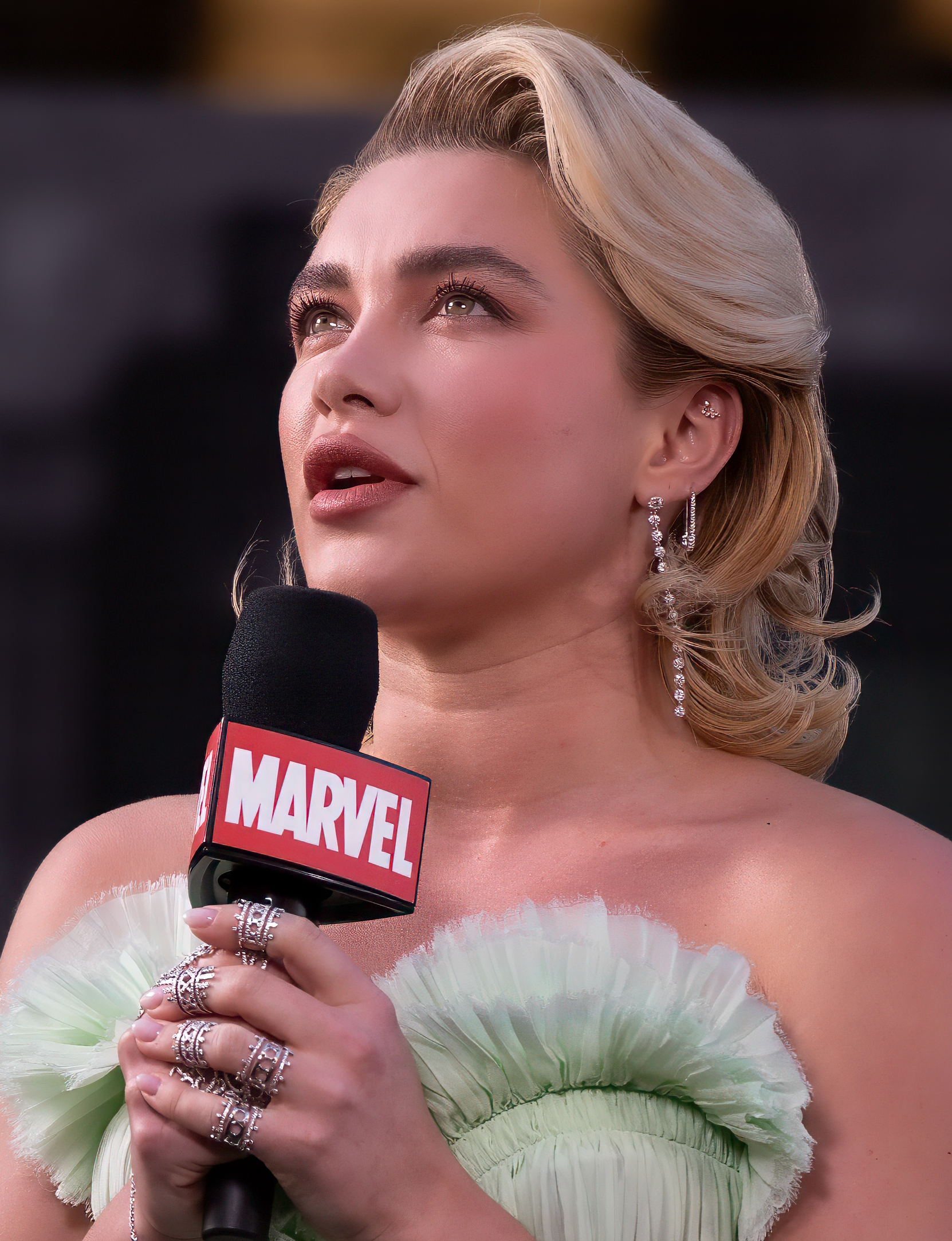
Florence Pugh received praise and accolades for her performance in the film.

On review aggregator Rotten Tomatoes, 88% of 381 critics gave Thunderbolts* a positive review, with an average rating of 7.1/10. The critics consensus reads, "Assembling a ragtag band of underdogs with Florence Pugh as their magnetic standout, Thunderbolts* refreshingly goes back to the tried-and-true blueprint of the MCU's best adventures." Metacritic, which uses a weighted average, assigned the film a score of 68 out of 100 based on 53 critics, indicating "generally favorable" reviews. Critics called it a return to form for the MCU, highlighting the character development, visuals, action sequences, and performances. The handling of mental health issues and the performances of Pugh and Pullman were especially praised. Audiences polled by CinemaScore gave the film an average grade of "A–" on an A+ to F scale, while those surveyed by PostTrak gave it an average of 4.5 out of 5 stars, with 74% saying they would definitely recommend the film.

Writing for NPR, critic Bob Mondello gave Thunderbolts* a generally positive review, calling the film "a decently effective blend of misfit mercenaries and pop psychology". Jake Coyle of the Associated Press gave it 3/4 stars, writing, "All the assembled parts here, including an especially high-quality cast (even Wendell Pierce!) work together seamlessly in a way that Marvel hasn't in some time. Most of all, Pugh commands every bit of the movie." Robbie Collin of The Daily Telegraph gave the film 2/5 stars, writing, "It's just dollop upon dollop of dourness, all the way to an end-credits scene that has the nerve to tease brighter, less narratively convoluted times ahead. Talk about creating a market." Nicholas Barber of BBC Culture gave Thunderbolts* a generally positive review, praising its character-driven approach and Pugh's performance. He noted that the film offers a more grounded and emotionally resonant narrative compared to recent Marvel releases, while still delivering the expected action and humor.

=== Accolades ===
Accolades received by Thunderbolts*
Award	Date of ceremony	Category	Recipient(s)	Result	Ref.
Astra Midseason Movie Awards	July 3, 2025	Best Picture	Thunderbolts*	Nominated	
Astra Midseason Movie Awards	July 3, 2025	Best Actress	Florence Pugh	Won	
Astra Midseason Movie Awards	July 3, 2025	Best Supporting Actor	Lewis Pullman	Nominated	
Astra Midseason Movie Awards	July 3, 2025	Best Stunts	Thunderbolts*	Nominated	
Costume Designers Guild Awards	February 12, 2026	Excellence in Sci-Fi/Fantasy Film	Sanja Milkovic Hays	Nominated	
Critics' Choice Super Awards	August 7, 2025	Best Superhero Movie	Thunderbolts*	Nominated	
Critics' Choice Super Awards	August 7, 2025	Best Actor in a Superhero Movie	David Harbour	Nominated	
Critics' Choice Super Awards	August 7, 2025	Best Actor in a Superhero Movie	Lewis Pullman	Nominated	
Critics' Choice Super Awards	August 7, 2025	Best Actress in a Superhero Movie	Julia Louis-Dreyfus	Nominated	
Critics' Choice Super Awards	August 7, 2025	Best Actress in a Superhero Movie	Florence Pugh	Won	
Critics' Choice Super Awards	August 7, 2025	Best Villain in a Movie	Lewis Pullman	Nominated	
Georgia Film Critics Association Awards	December 27, 2025	Oglethorpe Award for Excellence in Georgia Cinema	Thunderbolts*	Nominated	
Golden Trailer Awards	May 29, 2025	Best Fantasy/Adventure Trailer	Thunderbolts* "The Glory"	Nominated	
Golden Trailer Awards	May 29, 2025	Best Action Poster	Thunderbolts*	Nominated	
Golden Trailer Awards	May 29, 2025	Best Wildposts	Thunderbolts* "This is a Bolt Series"	Nominated	
Golden Trailer Awards	May 29, 2025	Best Teaser Poster	Thunderbolts* "Teaser Art"	Nominated	
Guild of Music Supervisors Awards	February 23, 2025	Best Music Supervision in a Trailer (Film)	Thunderbolts* Trailer 2	Nominated	
Hollywood Music in Media Awards	November 19, 2025	Original Score – Sci-Fi/Fantasy Film	Son Lux	Nominated	
Nickelodeon Kids' Choice Awards	June 21, 2025	Favorite Movie	Thunderbolts*	Nominated	
Nickelodeon Kids' Choice Awards	June 21, 2025	Favorite Butt-Kicker	Florence Pugh	Nominated	
Nickelodeon Kids' Choice Awards	June 21, 2025	Favorite Butt-Kicker	Sebastian Stan	Nominated	
Saturn Awards	March 8, 2026	Best Cinematic Adaptation	Thunderbolts*	Nominated	
Saturn Awards	March 8, 2026	Best Supporting Actress in a Film	Florence Pugh	Nominated	
Saturn Awards	March 8, 2026	Best 4K Home Media Release	Thunderbolts*	Nominated	
Washington D.C. Area Film Critics Association Awards	December 7, 2025	Joe Barber Award for Best Portrayal of Washington, D.C.	Thunderbolts*	Nominated	
