= James Wilkinson (actor) =

Jersey-born actor

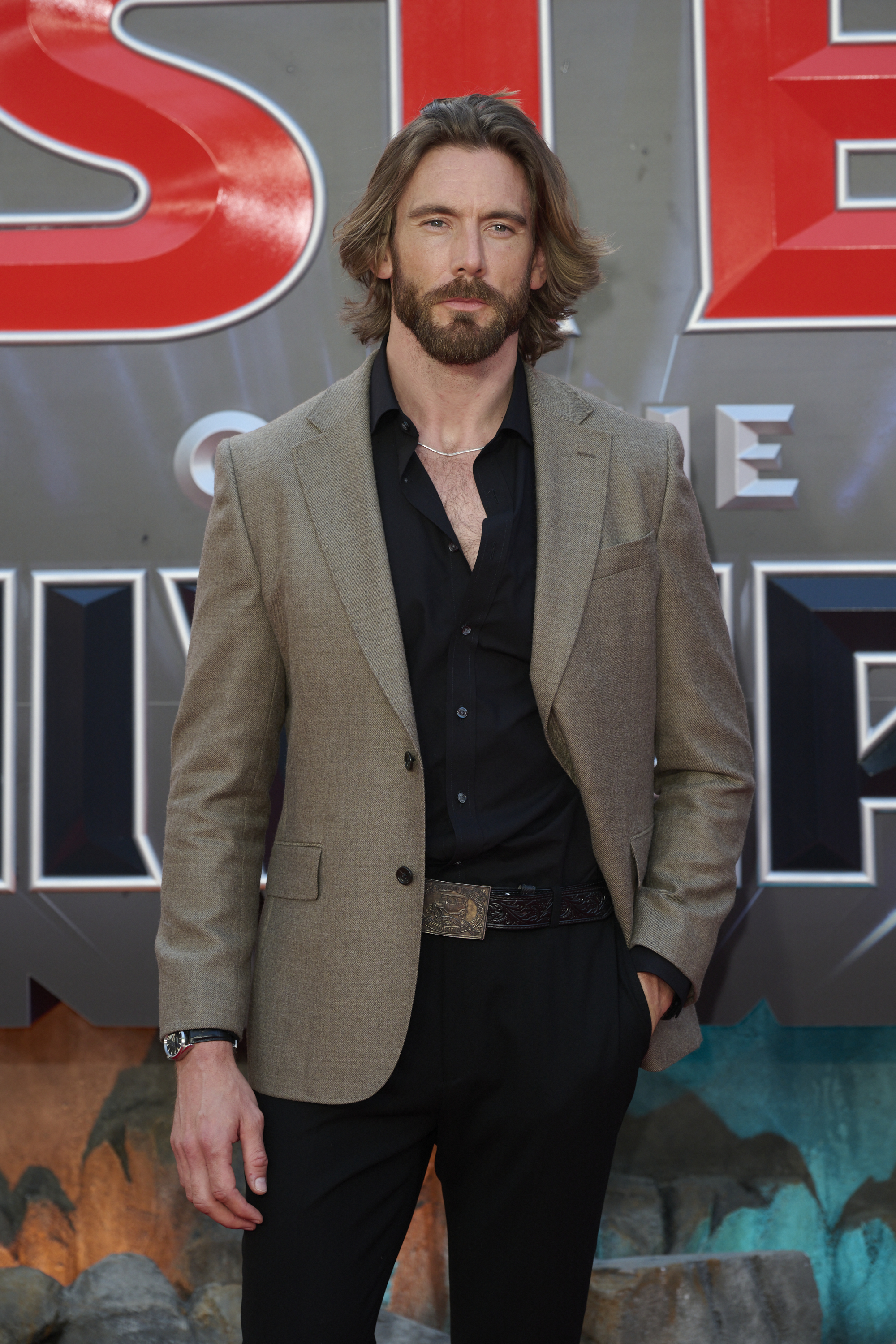
- Occupation: Actor
- Years active: 2020s–present
- Known for: Portraying Mekaneck in Masters of the Universe

James Wilkinson is a British actor, singer, dancer and stunt performer from Jersey. He is known for portraying Mekaneck in the 2026 fantasy film Masters of the Universe.

== Early life and education ==
Wilkinson was born and raised in Jersey, Channel Islands. He attended Mont Nicolle Primary School and Les Quennevais School before training at Bird College in London.

== Career ==
Wilkinson began his career in theatre, performance and stunt work. Prior to entering film acting, he worked as a singer, dancer and stunt performer.

In 2025, it was announced that Wilkinson had been cast as Mekaneck in Amazon MGM Studios' live-action adaptation of Masters of the Universe. The casting attracted media coverage in Jersey and the United Kingdom, including reports by BBC News, ITV News and Bailiwick Express.

Following the announcement, Wilkinson returned to his former school, Les Quennevais, to speak with students about pursuing careers in the performing arts.

In 2026, he appeared as Mekaneck in Masters of the Universe, directed by Travis Knight.

== Filmography ==
Year	Title	Role	Notes
2026	Masters of the Universe	Mekaneck	Feature film
