= Masters of the Universe (2026 film) =

2026 film by Travis Knight

- Theatrical release poster
- Directed by: Travis Knight
- Screenplay by: Chris Butler; Aaron Nee Adam Nee; David Callaham
- Story by: Aaron Nee; Adam Nee; Alex Litvak; Michael Finch
- Based on: Masters of the Universe by Mattel
- Produced by: Todd Black; Jason Blumenthal; Robbie Brenner; DeVon Franklin
- Starring: Nicholas Galitzine; Camila Mendes; Alison Brie; James Purefoy; Morena Baccarin; Jóhannes Haukur Jóhannesson; Kristen Wiig; Jared Leto; Idris Elba
- Cinematography: Fabian Wagner
- Edited by: Paul Rubell
- Music by: Daniel Pemberton
- Production companies: Amazon MGM Studios; Mattel Studios; Escape Artists
- Distributed by: Amazon MGM Studios (United States and Canada) (Note: released under the Metro-Goldwyn-Mayer banner.) (Note: excludes the province of Quebec (Immina Films)); Sony Pictures Releasing International (International) (Note: excludes France (Amazon Prime Video))
- Release dates: May 18, 2026 (TCL Chinese Theatre); June 5, 2026 (United States)
- Running time: 140 minutes
- Country: United States
- Language: English
- Budget: $170–200 million
- Box office: $114 million

Masters of the Universe (also known as He-Man and the Masters of the Universe in some territories) is a 2026 American science fantasy film directed by Travis Knight and written by Chris Butler, Aaron Nee, Adam Nee, and David Callaham. It is the second live-action film adaptation of the media franchise by Mattel following the 1987 film. Nicholas Galitzine stars as Prince Adam (He-Man), who returns to his home planet, Eternia, to take his destiny as He-Man and save his home from the evil forces of Skeletor (Jared Leto). Camila Mendes, Idris Elba, Alison Brie, James Purefoy, Jóhannes Haukur Jóhannesson, Charlotte Riley, Kristen Wiig, and Morena Baccarin co-star.

The production was announced in 2009 by Sony Pictures Entertainment with Escape Artists producing. Following multiple writer, director and casting changes, the rights were transferred to Netflix in 2022 and then bought by Amazon MGM Studios in 2024. Principal photography occurred in London, United Kingdom, from January to June 2025.

Masters of the Universe was premiered at the TCL Chinese Theatre in Los Angeles, California, on May 18, 2026, and was released in the United States by Amazon MGM Studios on June 5, 2026, and internationally by Sony Pictures Releasing International, to mostly positive reviews from critics. It underperformed at the box office, grossing $114 million worldwide on a $170–200 million production budget.

== Plot ==
In Eternos, the capital city of the planet Eternia, young Prince Adam and his friend Teela are trained in the art of battle by Duncan, the king's Man-At-Arms and Teela's father. The city is attacked by forces led by warlock Skeletor, who captures Adam's parents, King Randor and Queen Marlena, while Duncan is gravely injured by mercenary Trap Jaw. The Sorceress, guardian of Castle Grayskull on the outskirts of Eternos, sends Adam through a portal to Earth, Marlena's homeworld. She entrusts Adam with the Sword of Power, and Adam escapes but loses it.

Fifteen years later, an adult Adam works in human resources and lives with his friend Hussein in Oklahoma City. Obsessed with finding the sword, Adam eventually receives an anonymous tip via text message and reclaims it at a comic store. The next day, Adam is arrested for the sword's theft, but is stopped in transit on a freeway where he is attacked by Skeletor's lieutenant Beast Man. He is rescued by Teela, alerted after Adam touched the sword, and they escape in her ship to the ruins of Eternos, where the warriors of Eternia live in hiding from Skeletor's rule.

Offended by Adam's childhood nicknames for them, the warriors dismiss him as a nobody and imprison Adam and Teela with Duncan, now a drunk, and Roboto, a combat robot reprogrammed as a servant. The four escape and convince the warriors, including Fisto, Ram-Man, Dian and Mekaneck, to trust them. They are attacked by Skeletor's forces, and Trap Jaw stands in their path to board Teela's ship. Adam uses the sword to summon the power of Grayskull, transforming into a warrior, and defeats Trap Jaw.

Skeletor captures the others after Adam, Duncan, Roboto, and Teela flee, and executes Moss Man, forcing Fisto to admit that Adam has the sword. Skeletor reveals to Adam that his parents are alive and demands the sword as ransom. Adam, Teela, and Duncan reach Skeletor's lair at Snake Mountain, where Adam defeats Skeletor's personal guard and faces Skeletor, but Randor is mortally wounded in the ensuing cave-in. Knocked unconscious, Adam changes back into his mortal form as he and the others are imprisoned with Marlena. While imprisoned, Adam reunites with his tiger companion Cringer.

Skeletor discovers that he cannot access the sword's powers and his counselor, sorceress Evil-Lyn, suggests a ritual at Castle Grayskull. Adam and his comrades escape to Eternos and lead Fisto, Ram-Man, Dian, and Mekaneck against Skeletor's army. Duncan fights and kills Trap Jaw, but Roboto is destroyed. Riding on Cringer, Adam and Teela break into Castle Grayskull where Adam duels Skeletor, Teela takes on Evil-Lyn, and Cringer faces off against Beast Man. Skeletor shatters the Sword with his Havoc Staff, stabs Adam and proceeds to telepathically torment him inside his memories of Earth.

The Sorceress appears to Adam and explains that it is he, not the Sword, that truly harbors the power of Grayskull. Now free, Adam reconstitutes the Sword, summoning the power of Grayskull to transform into Eternia's champion once again. Adam tries to use his Earth-learned wisdom to negotiate with Skeletor, who rejects his peace offering. The two battle until Adam overpowers Skeletor, ultimately defeating him by reflecting his staff's power, destroying it and disintegrating his body. Meanwhile, Evil-Lyn flees.

Six months later, Marlena now reclaims rule over Eternos, where Adam and his friends welcome a refurbished Roboto as well as Hussein, who sees for himself that everything Adam told him was true. Teela asks whether Adam has a heroic name for himself, and he decides to call himself, "He-Man". Responding to a distress signal from an Avion village, Adam and Cringer leap into action as He-Man and the newly-armored Battle Cat.

In the town square, (Note: Before the credits roll.) the Trollan magician Orko appears, breaking the fourth wall, telling viewers the morals of the story. Later, (Note: In the mid-credits.) as Marlena watches He-Man and Battle Cat charge into battle, she tells Duncan she has given up hope for reuniting with both her children, while Duncan is more hopeful for her daughter's return. Elsewhere, Adam's long-lost twin sister Princess Adora discovers the Sword of Protection near the Fright Zone on the planet Etheria. Meanwhile, (Note: In the post-credits.) Evil-Lyn returns to Castle Grayskull to retrieve Skeletor's skull. As she leaves, Skeletor's laughter is heard.

== Cast ==
- Nicholas Galitzine as Adam Glenn / He-Man, the former Prince of Eternia who was raised on Earth after fleeing his home for his protection.
  - Artie Wilkinson-Hunt as young Adam.
- Camila Mendes as Teela, Duncan's adoptive daughter and Captain of the Guards of Eternia who serves as Adam's lieutenant and childhood best friend.
  - Eire Farrell as young Teela.
- Idris Elba as Duncan / Man-At-Arms, Teela's adoptive father and King Randor's trusted general who fights with his vast array of weapons and gadgets.
- Jared Leto as Skeletor, a skull-faced sorcerer and the tyrannical ruler of Eternia whose fiendish grip on the planet forces Prince Adam to embrace his true destiny as He-Man.
- Alison Brie as Evil-Lyn, a sorceress and Skeletor's right-hand-woman.
- James Purefoy as King Randor, the co-ruler of the Eternian kingdom of Eternos, Marlena's husband, and Adam's father who was usurped by Skeletor.
- Charlotte Riley as Queen Marlena, an ex-astronaut from Earth, co-ruler of Eternos, Randor's wife, and Adam's mother who was usurped by Skeletor.
- Morena Baccarin as the Sorceress, the guardian of Castle Grayskull whose magical knowledge is unsurpassed.
- Jóhannes Haukur Jóhannesson as Fisto, a Heroic Warrior with a distinctive large metal right hand.
- Jon Xue Zhang as Ram-Man, a Heroic Warrior known for his powerful headbutt attack.
- Sam C. Wilson as Trap Jaw, a cyborg weapons expert and member of Skeletor's Evil Warriors.
- Sasheer Zamata as Suzie, Adam's boss on Earth.
- Christian Vunipola as Hussein, Adam's roommate on Earth.
- Christiaan Bettridge as Dian, a Royal Guard who bullied Adam as a child.
  - Delilah O'Riordan as young Dian.
- James Wilkinson as Mekaneck, a Heroic Warrior who can extend his mechanical neck to great lengths.
- Kojo Attah as Tri-Klops, a member of Skeletor's Evil Warriors with three rotating mechanical eyes.
- James Apps as Spikor, a spike-covered member of Skeletor's Evil Warriors.
- Stephen Adentan as Moss Man, a humanoid plant creature.
- Arun Bassi as Pigboy, a pig-like member of Skeletor's Evil Warriors.

Additionally, Dolph Lundgren, who portrayed He-Man in the 1987 film, cameos as a "Macho Man" who Adam encounters at a gym. Elena Rivers appears as Julie, Adam's date and Lauren Saliu has a cameo in the film's second mid-credits scene as Adora, Adam's long lost twin sister.

=== Voices ===
- Kristen Wiig as Roboto, a robot who possesses great strength and resilience with her mechanical body.
- Piotr Michael as the Eternian ship that Teela pilots.
- Christopher Ragland as Orko, a magician from the parallel world of Trolla. The character appears during the first mid-credits scene.
- Gary Martin as Beast Man, an ape-like member of his similar-named kind and one of Skeletor's top lieutenants who has the power to mind control creatures. James Unsworth provided the motion capture for Beast Man, while John King served as stand-in for the animation.
- Tom Wilton as Cringer / Battle Cat, a talking green tiger who is Adam's pet and companion.
  - Fletcher Glenn voices a young Cringer.
- Kellen Goff as Goat Man, a formidable warrior allied with Skeletor. Hafþór Júlíus Björnsson served as the physical actor.
- Ben Pronsky as Karg, a member of Skeletor's Evil Warriors that holds a hook on his left hand. Hung Dante Dong served as the physical actor.

== Production ==
=== Development ===
A new He-Man film directed by John Woo was reportedly being developed in 2007, but the project was never officially greenlit. The film rights to He-Man reportedly reverted to Mattel. Years later, Warner Bros. Pictures announced that John Stevenson would direct the upcoming feature. In May 2009, it was announced that the scripting duties had been handed to Evan Daugherty, with Stevenson still attached to direct. In September 2009, Sony Pictures Entertainment took over the rights from Warner Bros. to produce the live-action adaptation after Mattel and producer Joel Silver, who was previously involved with a potential film, could not agree on creative direction. Sony and Escape Artists' Todd Black, Jason Blumenthal, and Steve Tisch were to start developing the project from scratch for Sony's Columbia Pictures. In April 2010, Sony hired screenwriters Mike Finch and Alex Litvak to draft a new script.

In late 2012, it was reported that Jon M. Chu was in talks to direct. The original He-Man actor Dolph Lundgren did an interview with IGN about a possible role as King Randor. In October 2012, Richard Wenk was hired to rewrite the script. In March 2013, Chu said the film was still in early development and that it would not be campy but an origin story. In October, The Hollywood Reporter reported that Terry Rossio would scribe, and the film would be set on Eternia; the report also stated that Chu would not direct.

In January 2014, Schmoes Know reported that Joe Cornish, Rian Johnson, Andrés Muschietti, Kirk DeMicco, Chris Sanders, and Phil Lord and Christopher Miller were named as frontrunners to direct. The following month, it was reported that directors Mike Cahill, Jeff Wadlow, Harald Zwart, and Chris McKay were on the short list to direct. In April, they updated that Wadlow would direct, while The Hollywood Reporter announced that he was rewriting the script.

In August 2015, it was announced that Christopher Yost had been hired to re-write the script. In January 2016, Deadline reported that McG would direct and would also oversee a rewrite of the latest script by Finch and Litvak, with DeVon Franklin added as a producer. In June 2016, Kellan Lutz tweeted that he has a meeting with both McG and Mary Viola about the role of He-Man. In April 2017, it was announced that the film would be released on December 18, 2019. At the same time, McG left the project, and David S. Goyer had been hired to rewrite the script. In December 2017, it was reported that Goyer was now set to not only write but direct. In February 2018, Variety reported that Goyer had decided to step away as director to focus on other projects, but he would remain on board as an executive producer and screenwriter and the studio was said to be very happy with the script he turned in and was meeting with potential replacements. Carlos Huante, a creature designer, former artist at Industrial Light and Magic and who also worked on the original Filmation cartoon, was hired by Goyer; however, in an interview, Huante said that Sony felt that Goyer's script would be too expensive to film, as Goyer had intended for the movie to be on the epic scale of The Lord of the Rings trilogy. He confirmed that Goyer's ideas would no longer be used.

In April 2018, Variety reported that Aaron and Adam Nee would direct. In January 2019, Art Marcum and Matt Holloway were brought in and it was announced that they would write a new draft. In March 2019, it was reported that Noah Centineo was in talks to play He-Man with Centineo confirming a month later that he had been officially cast in the role. In April 2021, it was reported that Centineo vacated the role of He-Man.

In January 2022, it was announced that Netflix had officially acquired the rights from Sony, after producing the animated shows Masters of the Universe: Revelation and He-Man and the Masters of the Universe, with Kyle Allen cast as He-Man. It was also revealed that the Nee Brothers and David Callaham had written a new draft of the screenplay. In October 2022, Allen had stated he was working out six hours a day in preparation for the role. In July 2023, Netflix cancelled the film, after spending $30 million on development, citing budgetary concerns, leading Mattel to search for a new buyer and causing the Nee brothers to no longer be the directors.

=== Pre-production ===
In November 2023, it was revealed that Amazon MGM Studios was eyeing to purchase the film rights. In February 2024, it was announced that Travis Knight was in final talks to replace the Nee brothers and become the new director, with frequent collaborator Chris Butler hired to rewrite the screenplay. In May 2024, it was officially confirmed that Knight would direct for Amazon MGM. Production designer Guy Hendrix Dyas joined the project to oversee visual world-building and character design. Richard Sale served as the costume designer.

Ultimately, Butler alongside the writing team of the Nee brothers and Callaham received "screenplay by" credit, while the Nee brothers with the writing duo of Litvak and Finch received "story by" credit. Offscreen "additional literary material credit" went to Lindsey Anderson Beer, Will Beall, Peter Craig, David Odell (writer of the 1987 Masters of the Universe film), Rossio, McG, Goyer, Justin Rhodes, Yost, Jason Keller, Marcum, Holloway, Christopher Ford, Wenk, Chris Shafer, Paul Vicknair, and Wadlow.

=== Casting ===
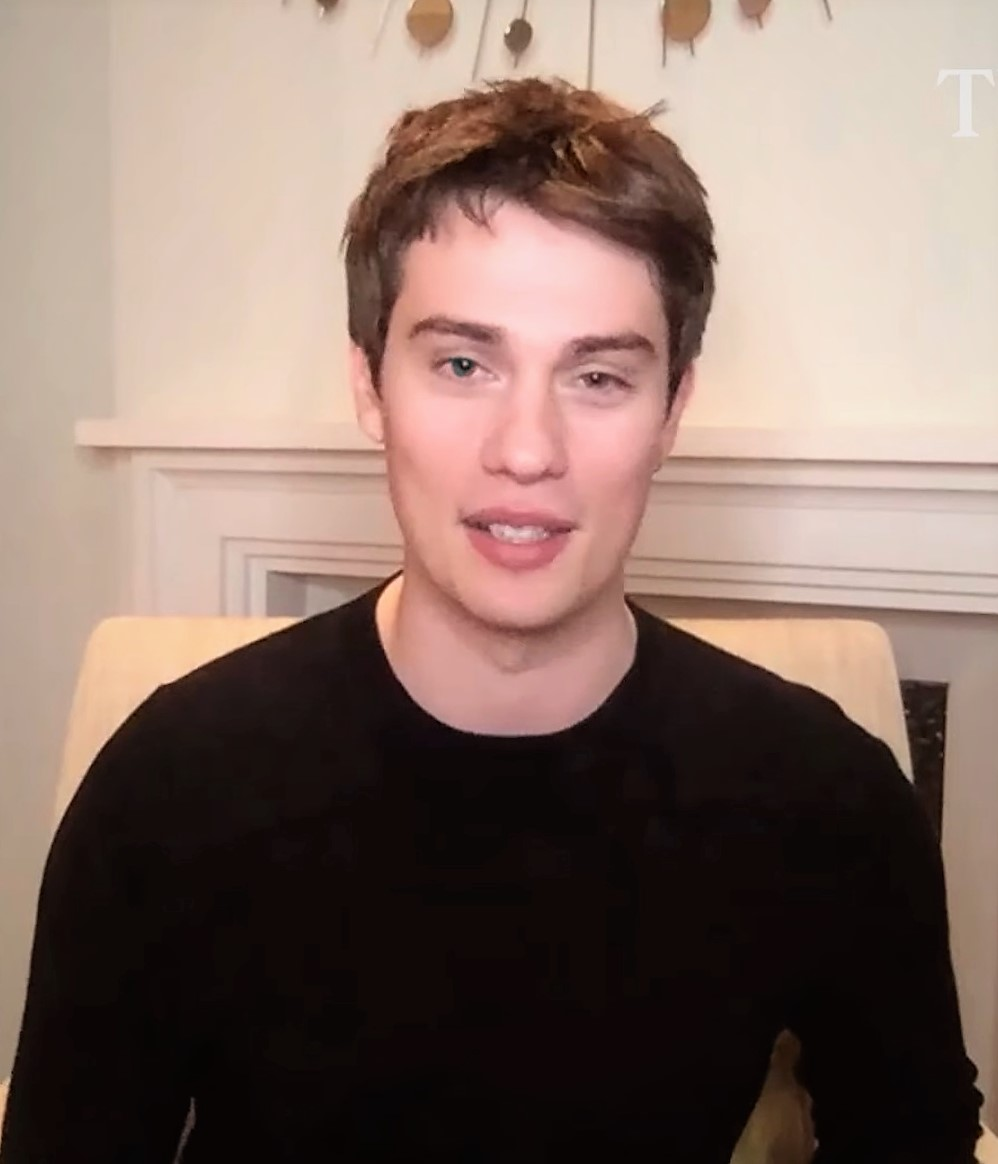
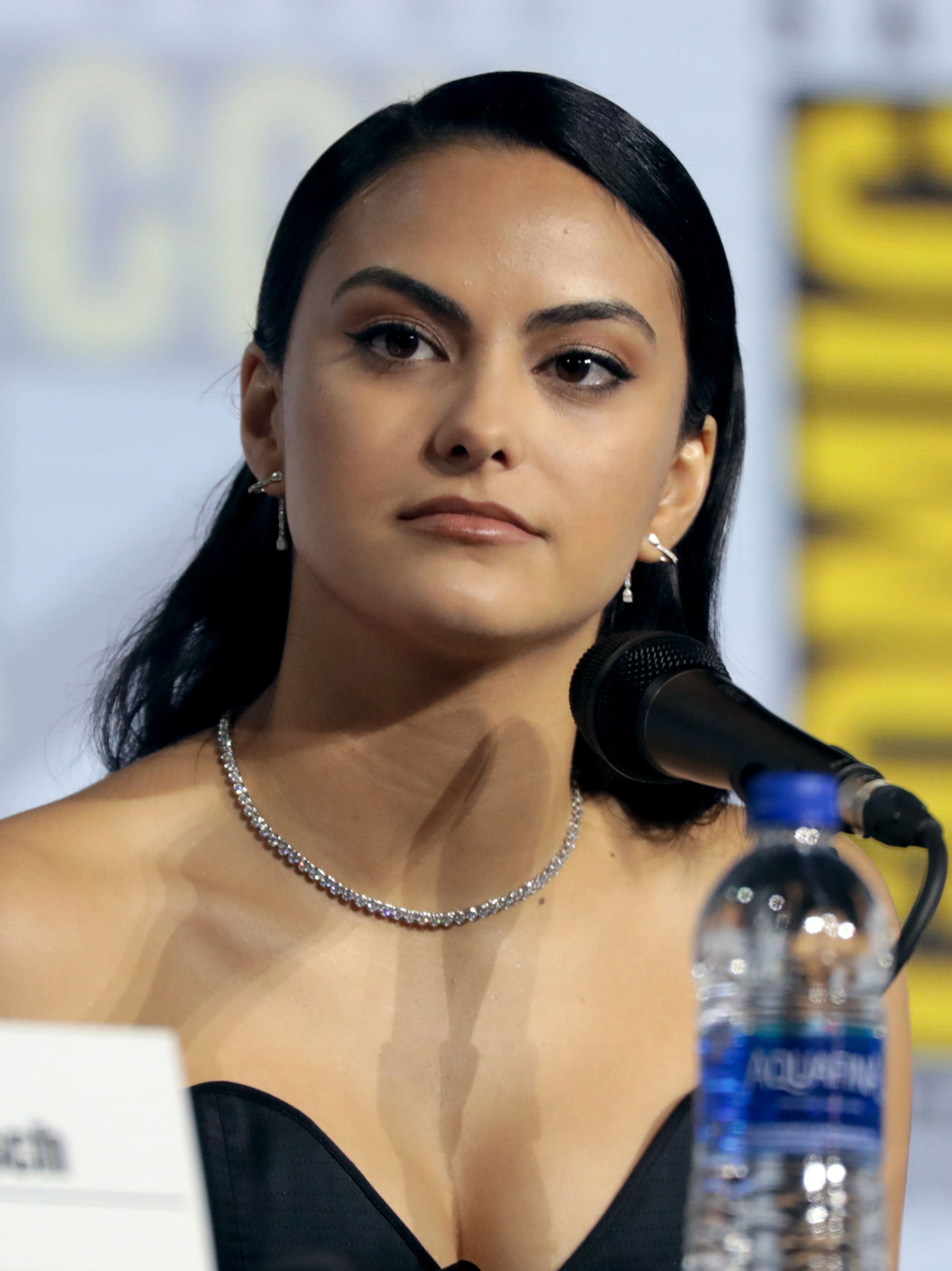
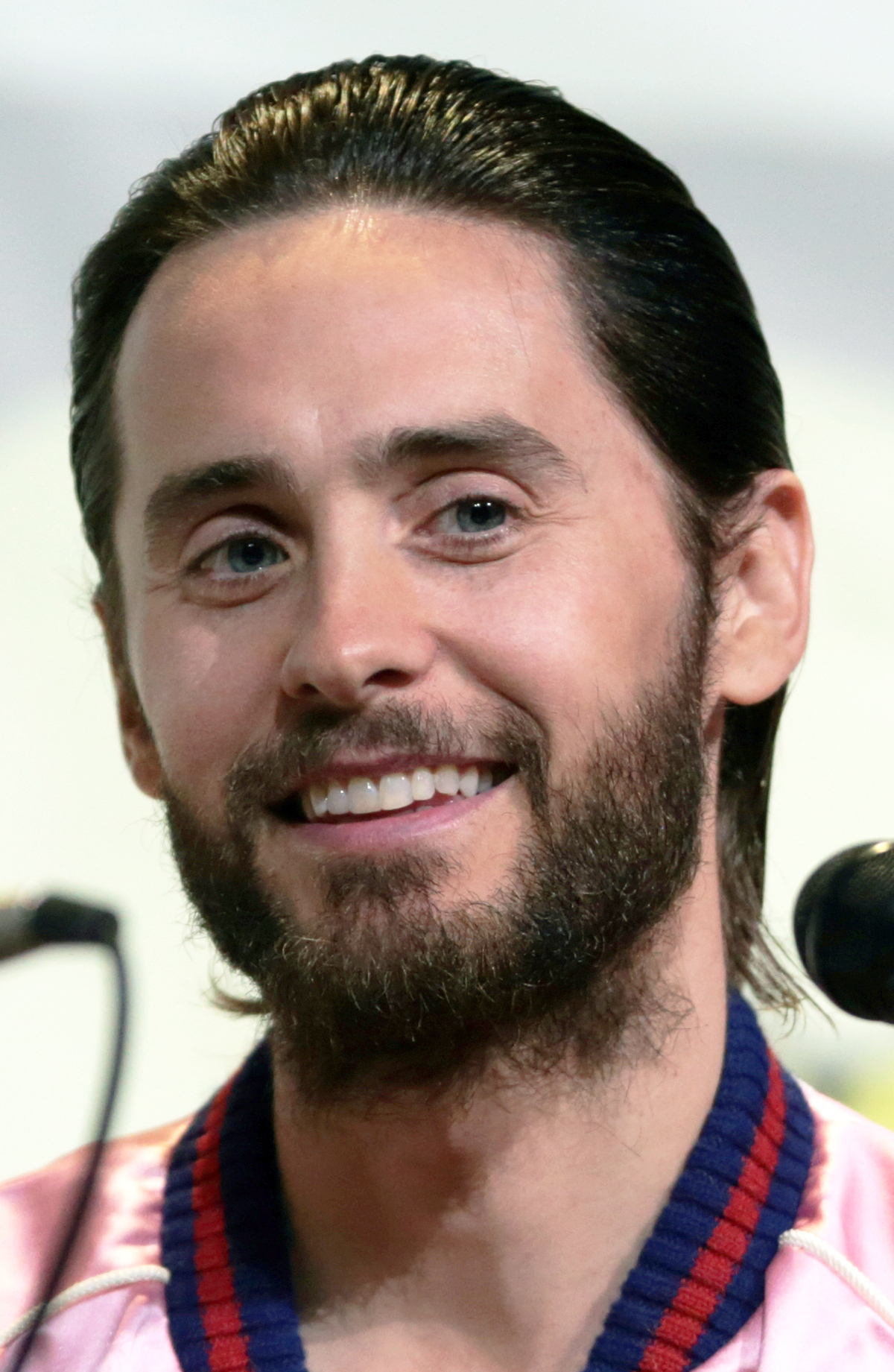
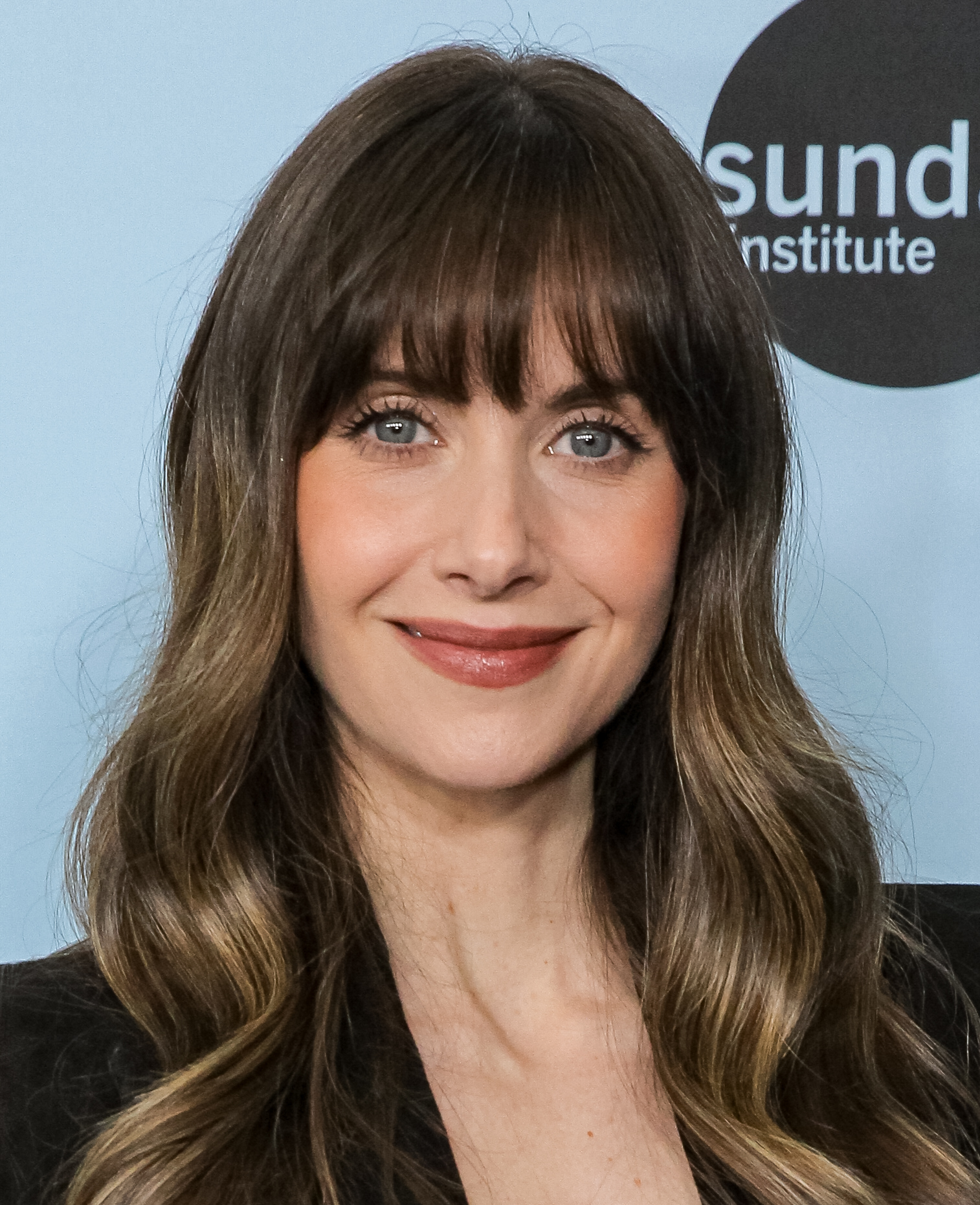
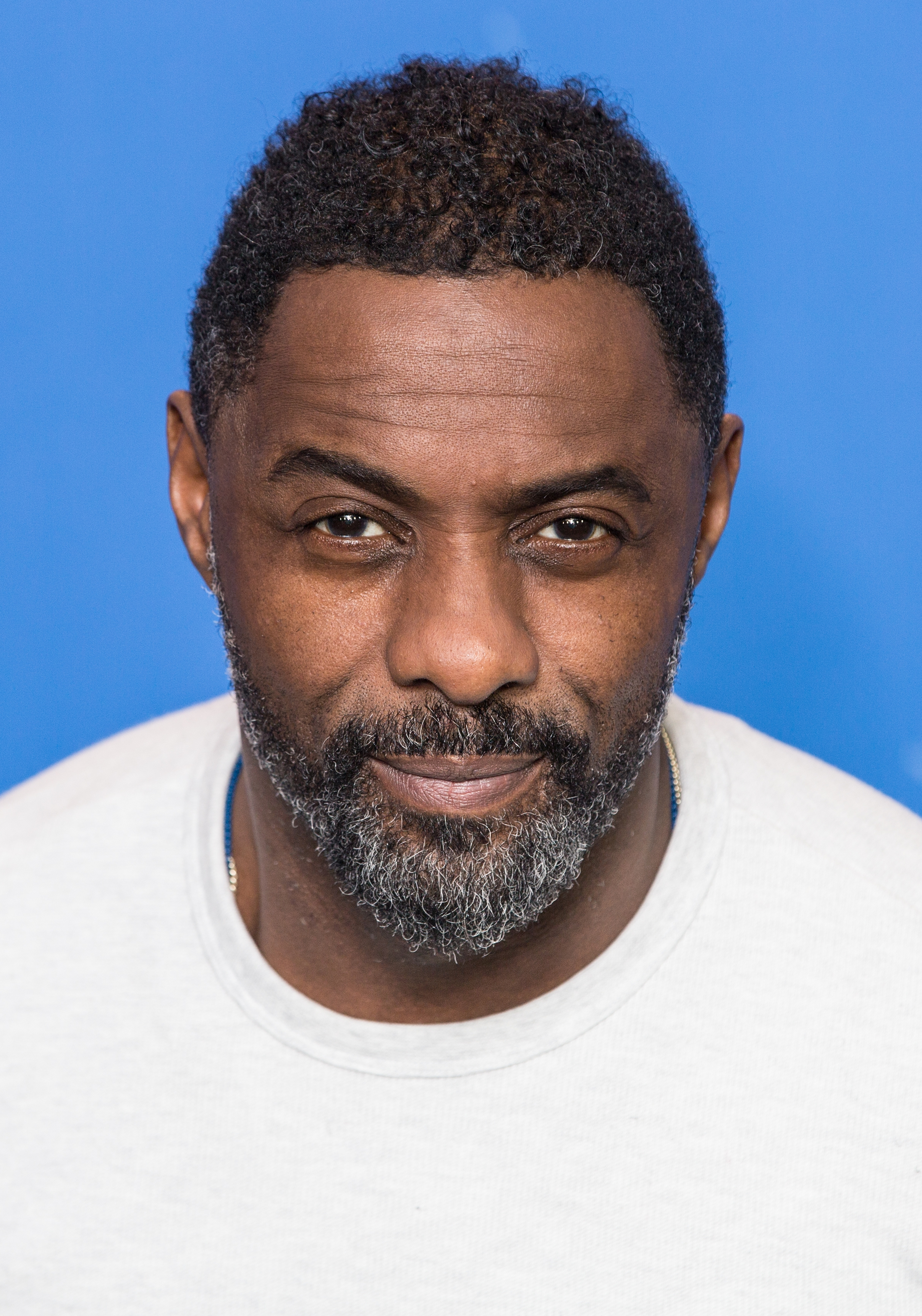
The cast of Masters of the Universe: Nicholas Galitzine, Camila Mendes, Jared Leto, Alison Brie and Idris Elba

A few weeks after Amazon MGM's acquisition, Nicholas Galitzine was cast as He-Man, replacing Allen. In August, Camila Mendes joined the cast as Teela. In September, Alison Brie joined the cast as the antagonist Evil-Lyn. Jared Leto had asked for the role of Skeletor. According to director Travis Knight, Leto proactively approached the studio and the filmmakers because he is a huge fan of the franchise and wanted a chance to "swing for the fences" with the character. In November, Idris Elba joined the cast as Man-At-Arms. In December, Leto was confirmed for the role of Skeletor, alongside Sam C. Wilson as Trap Jaw, Hafþór Júlíus Björnsson as Goat Man, and Kojo Attah as Tri-Klops.

In February 2025, Morena Baccarin, Jóhannes Haukur Jóhannesson, James Purefoy, Charlotte Riley, Jon Xue Zhang, Sasheer Zamata, and Christian Vunipola joined the cast, playing the Sorceress of Castle Grayskull, Malcolm / Fisto, King Randor, Queen Marlena, Ram-Man, Suzie, and Hussein respectively. In August 2025, it was announced that Kristen Wiig had been cast as Roboto. Ahead of the film's release, voice actor Gary Martin was revealed to be voicing Beast Man in May 2026.

=== Filming ===
Principal photography began on January 6, 2025, in London at Sky Studios Elstree, with Fabian Wagner serving as the cinematographer. Filming was originally scheduled for mid-July 2019 in Prague, Summer 2022, and April 2023. On June 15, 2025, Galitzine confirmed on his Instagram that filming had officially wrapped. Additional filming occurred at Bray Film Studios. Location filming took place around Canary Wharf, including Cabot Square and the Canary Wharf tube station. Other notable locations include Wells Cathedral, Wookey Hole Caves and the Beer Quarry Caves. Some scenes were also filmed in Iceland, with production service provided by Truenorth.

=== Post-production ===
Paul Rubell was the editor. Tim Burke and David Vickery were the visual effects supervisors, with visual effects provided by Industrial Light & Magic (ILM), DNEG, Rodeo FX, Cinesite, Untold Studios and Host VFX. Masters of the Universe features 2,180 visual effects shots, with ILM doing 793 shots focusing on the Beastman sequence, the Rift spacetime, He-Man’s transformation, Subternia, Trap Jaw and Snake Mountain. DNEG worked on 750 shots including the opening scenes, Skeletor’s invasion on Eternos, Cringer and the final battle on Greyskull. DNEG based Eternos on real-world walled cities in Italy, medieval castles in Wales and the Wells Cathedral in Somerset. ILM and DNEG collaborated on Skeletor facial expressions and Roboto. Rodeo FX worked on 150 shots on the Sky Sled Chase Sequence and the “Ancient Forest” Sequence which was collaborated with DNEG. Cinesite worked on the “Hallway Battle” scene, the holographic projections of Eternia and the Skeletor’s Boudoir sequence. Untold Studios worked on the opening shots with the landscapes of Eternia and the forging of the Sword of Power.

== Music ==
Daniel Pemberton was the composer, working with the Queen guitarist Brian May. British rock band The Darkness released the title theme song "Masters of the Universe" on May 22. The soundtrack album was released digitally by Lakeshore Records on June 5. "The Legend of Eternia" by Daniel Pemberton, Brian May and The Darkness was release separately on August 7. Included in the film but not in the soundtrack are the songs "What's Up?" by 4 Non Blondes, "The Man" by the Killers, "The Power" by Snap!, and "Princes of the Universe" by Queen.

== Release ==
=== Theatrical ===
Masters of the Universe had its premiere at the TCL Chinese Theatre on May 18, 2026, and was released by Amazon MGM Studios in the United States on June 5, 2026. It was originally scheduled to be released theatrically in the United States on March 5, 2021, by Sony Pictures Releasing (who would later acquire international theatrical distribution rights in June 2025), until Uncharted (which itself was later delayed due to the COVID-19 pandemic) briefly took over its release date.

=== Home media ===
Masters of the Universe was released on Amazon Prime Video on July 22, 2026. The July 20–26, 2026 Nielsen streaming ratings reported Masters of the Universe as the top streaming title shortly after Prime Video release, scored 1.17 billion minutes of watch time. FlixPatrol reported that it reached No. 1 in 25 countries, with the UK reach second.

=== Marketing ===
On May 19, 2026, a drone light show produced by Amazon over Los Angeles to promote Masters of the Universe set a new Guinness World Record for "Largest Drone Light Show".

== Reception ==
=== Box office ===
Masters of the Universe grossed $65 million in the United States and Canada, and $49 million in other territories, for a worldwide total of $114 million. In the United States and Canada, Masters of the Universe was released alongside Scary Movie, and was projected to gross $30–35 million from 3,677 theaters in its opening weekend. It made $11.7 million on its first day, including $4.4 million from Thursday night previews. It debuted to an underwhelming $29.3 million, finishing second behind Scary Movie. In its second weekend, it grossed $8.6 million (a drop of 70%), finishing in fifth place behind newcomer Disclosure Day, Obsession, Scary Movie and Backrooms. Jeremy Fuster from TheWrap attributed the sharp decline to a failure to reach an audience beyond "Gen X male moviegoers nostalgic for the 80s fantasy franchise", while Rebecca Rubin from Variety commented that it was shaping up to be one of the biggest box-office bombs of the year, and that it "will have a harder time justifying its mega price tag".

In response to the underperformance at the box office, Amazon MGM's domestic distribution chief, Kevin Wilson, downplayed negative and highlighted the positive critical response and upswing potential upon streaming release, noting: "this opening is exactly the kind of critical first moment that validates our holistic distribution strategy—building awareness and engagement that will carry well beyond the theatrical window."

=== Critical response ===
The critical reception was described as mostly positive by several publications. (Note: Multiple references:) On the review aggregator website Rotten Tomatoes, 68% of 257 critics' reviews are positive, with an average rating of 6.2/10. The website's consensus reads: "By the power of Grayskull and with a little help from its self-deprecating script and spirited cast, Masters of the Universe is a delightful adventure that finds the humanity in He-Man." Metacritic, which uses a weighted average, assigned it a score of 52 out of 100, based on 44 critics, indicating "mixed or average" reviews. Audiences polled by CinemaScore gave it an average grade of "B" on an A+ to F scale, while 64% of those surveyed by PostTrak said they would "definitely recommend" it.

Critics praised Knight's direction, the performances of the cast, action sequences, and nostalgic tone, while some were divided over its humor, pacing, and screenplay. In an 8 out of 10 review, Clint Gage of IGN called it "a film that appreciates the source material, silly names and all, and proves the best way to add to a 50-year-old [sic] franchise that's about toys as much as anything else is to not take it too seriously," and praised Leto's "delightfully weird and cartoonish" portrayal of Skeletor. Writing for The Irish Times, Donald Clarke described it as "a minor miracle" that "dances gaily [...] on the 'fine line between clever and stupid'". Zaki Hasan of the San Francisco Chronicle praised it for telling "a rousing fantasy adventure with conviction, humor and heart." Ricky Archuleta of Film Threat awarded it 10 out of 10, describing it as "a thrilling ride featuring high-octane action sequences and performances fueled by an infectious, heroic heart that make the audience root for the 'good guys' to emerge victorious."

Kyle Smith of The Wall Street Journal described Masters of the Universe as "a two-hour-plus comedy-and-effects bonanza whose fantasy images are more notable for their quantity than quality, like a digital Golden Corral". In a 2 out of 5 review, Kevin Maher of The Times wrote that "Masters of the Universe is a patchwork misfire that fancies itself as a new Thor: Ragnarok, Flash Gordon or Guardians of the Galaxy without displaying a sliver of originality and which instead frequently trips over its own wildly confused gender politics." Benjamin Lee of The Guardian gave it 2 out of 5, writing: "Amazon's head-scratching $200m-budgeted misfire fails to explain why so much time, money and effort has been wasted… [in a] laboured attempt to resurrect [a] toy IP very few people still care about".

=== Accolades ===
Accolades received by Masters of the Universe
| Award | Date of ceremony | Category | Recipient(s) | Result | Ref. |
|---|---|---|---|---|---|
| Astra Midseason Movie Awards | June 30, 2026 | Best Stunts | Masters of the Universe | Nominated | |
| Critics' Choice Super Awards | August 6, 2026 | Best Superhero Movie | Masters of the Universe | Nominated | |
| Critics' Choice Super Awards | August 6, 2026 | Best Actor in a Superhero Movie | Nicholas Galitzine | Nominated | |
| Critics' Choice Super Awards | August 6, 2026 | Best Actress in a Superhero Movie | Camila Mendes | Nominated | |
| Critics' Choice Super Awards | August 6, 2026 | Best Villain in a Movie | Jared Leto | Nominated | |
| World Soundtrack Awards | October 10, 2026 | Film Composer of the Year | Daniel Pemberton (Note: Also for The Bad Guys 2 (2025), The Drama (2026), and Project Hail Mary (2026)) | Won | |

== Future ==
Prior to its release, Knight said in May 2026 that he intended Masters of the Universe to work as a standalone film with the potential for sequels. In another interview, Knight said, "With every movie that I've ever made, I've always imagined where the characters go outside ... the bounds of the movie. You want to tell a self-contained story, and I think we've done that with this movie, but there are things within the wider mythology that didn't fit within that, and the She-Ra character was one of them. Adora is also a character that carries a lot of weight with her. A lot of people, myself included, love that character, so we wanted to give a little nod to where that could go if we were given the opportunity to tell more stories."
