= Union Station (shopping mall) =

Union Station Mall
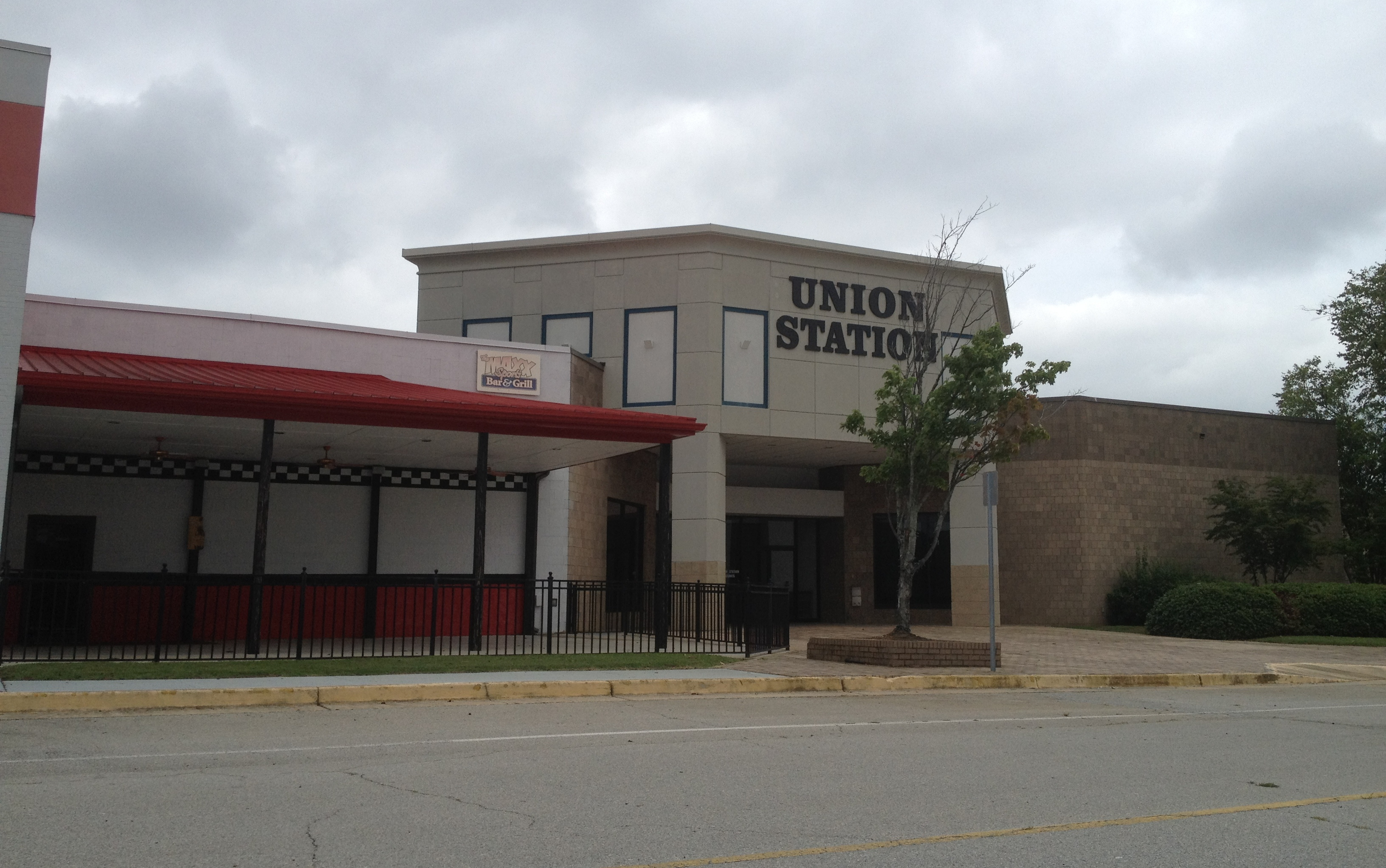
- Exterior view of Union Station, July 2012
- Location: Union City, Georgia, United States
- Coordinates: 33.572°N 84.534°W
- Opened: August 7, 1980
- Closed: November 3, 2010
- Demolished: Started October 27, 2014
- Previous names: Shannon Mall (1980–1987; 1999–2006); Shannon Southpark Mall (1987–1999)
- Developer: Cadillac Fairview
- Manager: Orlando Allen (2009–2010); David Long (1990s–2009)
- Owner: RookerCo.
- Num. of stores: 95
- Num. of anchor tenants: 4
- Floor area: 764,882 sq ft (71,059.9 m^{2})
- Floors: 1
- Parking: 4,332

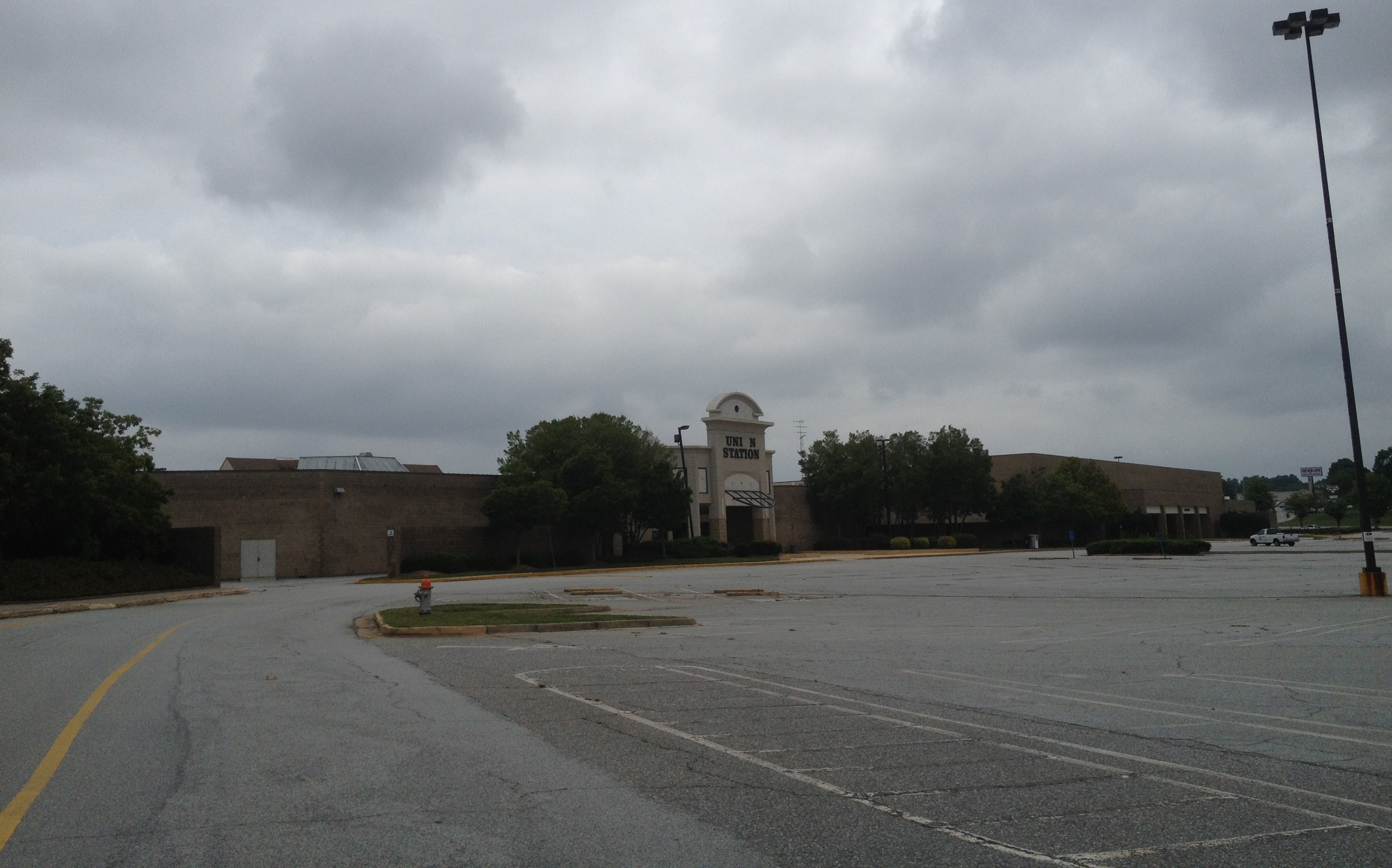
External view of Union Station, July 2012

Union Station was a shopping mall in Union City, Georgia, in southwest Metro Atlanta adjacent to Interstate 85. Originally Shannon Mall, it opened in 1980 and initially thrived until the 1990s when growth in neighboring cities drew shoppers away from the mall. In 1987, it was renamed Shannon Southpark Mall, but the name was changed back to Shannon Mall in 1999. After new ownership and renovations in 2006, the name was changed to Union Station Mall. After many years of decline, the mall closed in November 2010, and demolition began in late October 2014 to make way for Atlanta Metro Studios, a film and television studio.

== History ==
The mall opened on August 7, 1980 as Shannon Mall with anchor stores Sears, Rich's, and Davison's. It was renovated in 1986, 1999, and 2006. In 1987, the mall became Shannon Southpark Mall, but was changed back to Shannon Mall after its renovation in 1999 due to the fact that 38% of people in a survey claimed to still use that name. In 2006, the mall was again renamed - this time as Union Station Mall.

In 1986, the mall was renovated by adding a new wing that Mervyn's occupied.

In the early 1990s, under new management, the mall began a slight decline as less money was spent on advertising while some of the anchors cut back on inventory. In 1996, after the nearby Fayette Pavilion opened, some stores including Linens 'n Things and Toys "R" Us left the mall. In January 1997 Mervyn's announced its plans to close and JCPenney began operating in the Mervyn's wing in October. In March 1998, Macy's moved out of the former Davison's building which would remain unoccupied for the duration of the mall's operation.

In 1999, the mall underwent a $10 million renovation which saw the floor replaced with Italian tile, an enhanced ceiling, new benches with softer seating, a new look to the three main entrances with a lighter color scheme, removal of the food court's elevated seating area and a downgrade in the size of the mall's central fountain.

In 2000, the decline continued as JCPenney left the mall and the Mervyn's wing lost so many tenants that management required the remaining ones to move elsewhere in the mall. The wing was blocked from late 2004 until late 2006. While not in use, the wing was required by Union City to have a functional fire escape door near the boarded up wall leading to the mall's entrance/exit within that wing for emergencies.

In 2006, the Mervyn's wing became an entertainment complex named Maxx-Fun. Maxx-Fun had plans to take over the entire wing by adding a bowling alley, a comedy club, and other entertainment venues in the vacant store fronts. Shortly after construction began it was abruptly halted when one of the investors died. The mall's owner, Lee Najjir, was an investor himself and no longer desired to participate in the deal. Maxx-Fun operated until fall 2009 before leaving the mall with two vacant anchors again.

The mall (during the tenure of Orlando Allen) sought to reopen Maxx-Fun and sought entertainment-based tenants for the former Macy's building. Several firms showed interest in it, but no one moved beyond initial conversations. Also, Maxx-Fun had a website in summer 2010 announcing its return to Union Station Mall. However, its fixtures and signs were removed from the property at some point afterwards, and its website is no longer functioning.

== Notable features ==
The mall had skylights that provided natural light inside the mall, bright corridors, and a large sun window in the food court. Also, prior to the mall's renovation in 1999, there was a rise in the food court. There was also a water fountain in the middle of the mall, which was a smaller version of one that previously existed. Also, while most of the mall had only one floor, the former Macy's building was the only part that had two floors.

Additionally, near the food court main entrance, a large multi-monitor display once existed - showing mall-related advertisements. Prior to the mall's closing, there were plans to create "Mall TV" to provide original programming for mall patrons.

In one wing, there existed a large metal sculpture of a clown on a unicycle - animated and positioned below one of the ceiling skylights. The sculpture was eventually removed after many complaints of the decay of the statue.

== Competition ==
The mall suffered several blows that stymied its potential. Shannon Tower, the office building that sits behind the former mall, was the pilot of several similar office structures planned. The tower, according to Bull Realty, opened in 1978 - two years before the mall. Woody Johnson, the leasing consultant for the property, stated that the late developer, Scott Hudgins (who also developed the mall), wanted to build office complexes behind the mall. The demand for such never materialized, and the parcels remained naturally wooded. The office developments were supposed to provide constant foot traffic for the mall.

In 1996, the Fayette Pavilion opened - taking Linens 'n Things, Toys "R" Us, and several other tenants away from the mall. The Fayette Pavilion was supposed to be another enclosed mall for the south side, but city and county zoning laws prohibited such. In 1998, Macy's closed its original location in the former Davison's building. Arbor Place Mall opened in 1999 - pulling the Douglas County shoppers away from the mall, and several other stores were lured away from the mall. In 2003, Camp Creek Marketplace opened on Camp Creek, and while some retailers had locations in both Camp Creek and Shannon Mall, the Shannon locations were closed by late 2004. The proposed mall in Newnan became Ashley Park - an open-air shopping center that featured restaurants and retailers such as Belk and Dillard's. This development had always been on the radar as a threat to Shannon since the 1990s, as it was like other planned malls in the metro area. Ashley Park, by some experts, took potential tenants who would have probably set up shop in Shannon Mall. Greenbriar Mall, the mall that Shannon was giving a run for its money, even lured tenants away from the area when the mall was dying.

== Other barriers to growth ==
Some real estate scholars have argued that the area was never suited for the proposed potential of the mall. The demographics of the South Fulton cities such as Union City, Palmetto, and Fairburn were not strong enough to support such. The mall relied heavily on being regional - pulling people from Coweta County, Douglas County, Fayette County, Camp Creek, Cascade, Southwest Atlanta, and airport travelers. As more developments opened, fewer people came back to Shannon Mall. It failed to attract sit-down eateries beyond a Cracker Barrel (which closed prior to the mall's closing) and Buffalo's Cafe (which opened and closed in 2002). Gladys Knight's Chicken and Waffles looked into opening up a store in the mall but chose to be near the bowling alley instead.

As even an undercover vote of no confidence in the mall, Union City focused more on the annexations of South Fulton Parkway and building up the industrial community on Oakley Industrial Boulevard.

== Final attempts to survive ==
By 2006, the mall was struggling to keep the few major retailers it had left. Many were staples from the mall's heyday. As the more major names left, the numbers were dwindling. Some of the vacant spots were filled by independent and startup retailers, but many of them ultimately left due to the lack of business. In 2009, according to an interview of Maria Allen (former Marketing Director) in Home Rule News, the mall had only 32 stores left (including the big-box anchors).

The mall offered incentives such as free rent for a period to lure businesses back into the mall. Event planners were given the use of the mall corridors to hold events to draw in potential shoppers. However, no major corporations bit. Event planners hit snags, as Union City required permits and variances, as the mall was not zoned for assembly usage. Some events such as an En Vogue concert, the annual Union City Mayor's Race, and Race Against Cancer did draw numbers. However, few people actually went inside the mall.

Prior to the mall's closing, there were plans to create "Mall TV" to provide original programming for mall patrons. In addition, several firms were brought in to provide entertainment for mall patrons such as live radio broadcasting, stage plays, town hall meetings, fashion shows, and others. These events brought small numbers and some attention - but not enough to sustain the mall.

In 2010, Chick-fil-A closed, being the only original tenant left from the mall's 1980 opening.

== Closure and redevelopment ==
Due to the mall's owner, Lee Najjar, not paying the power bill, Georgia Power shut off electricity to the mall on November 2, 2010 at 10:30 p.m. after tenants were warned. Macy's and Sears, however, remained open since they had their own electric meters. However, although they initially stayed open after the mall's closure, Macy's announced in January 2011 its plans to leave. Sears, the last open store at the mall, remained open for several more months until finally announcing in August 2011 its plans to leave later in the year.

By January 3, 2011, the foreclosed mall remained closed, and was auctioned at the Fulton County Courthouse the following day. The mall was purchased by Colonial Capital, a California investment company. Afterwards, the mall was placed back on the market for sale. According to Home Rule News, no buyers had shown interest in the property by May 2011.

In February 2014, the mall was sold to RookerCo, and on October 27, 2014, a demolition ceremony at the site of the former mall took place to make way for a film and television production facility as well as a distribution center.

In early 2016, the Atlanta Metro Studios opened for business on the site of the former Shannon Mall. Atlanta Metro Studios has the two largest purpose-built sound stages in North America. The largest purpose-built stage is 80,000 square feet with a 40' clear height. The second largest purpose-built stage is 55,000 square feet with 40' clear height. Because of the unique configuration of these two stages, they can be subdivided into smaller stages by closing multiple operable sound-proof walls. There is the ability to have as many as 6 smaller stages at one time: (4) 20,000 sq ft and (2) 27,500 sq ft.

=== Filmography ===
==== Films ====
- Jumanji: Welcome to the Jungle (2017)
- Pitch Perfect 3 (2017)
- Sextuplets (2019)
- The House with a Clock in Its Walls (2018)
- Boss Level (2021)
- Thunder Force (2021)
- Red Notice (2021)
- Shazam! Fury of the Gods (2023)
- Ghosted (2023)
- Thunderbolts* (2025)

==== Television series ====
- 24: Legacy (2017)
- The Gifted (2017–19)
- Insatiable (2018–19)
- The Titan Games (2019–20)
- The Passage (2019)
- Watchmen (2019)
- Candy (2022)
- First Kill (2022)
- A Friend of the Family (2022)
- Secret Chef (2023)
- Agatha All Along (2024)
