= Critics' Choice Super Award for Best Superhero Movie =

Film award

- Country: United States
- Presented by: Critics Choice Association
- First award: 2021
- Currently held by: Superman (2026)
- Website: criticschoice.com

The Critics' Choice Super Award for Best Superhero Movie is an award presented by the Critics Choice Association to the best film in the superhero genre.

== Winners and nominees ==
Year	Film	Director	Ref.
2021	The Old Guard	Gina Prince-Bythewood	
2021	Birds of Prey (and the Fantabulous Emancipation of One Harley Quinn)	Cathy Yan	
2021	Secret Society of Second-Born Royals	Anna Mastro	
2021	Sonic the Hedgehog	Jeff Fowler	
2021	Superman: Man of Tomorrow	Chris Palmer	
2022	Spider-Man: No Way Home	Jon Watts	
2022	Black Widow	Cate Shortland	
2022	Eternals	Chloé Zhao	
2022	Shang-Chi and the Legend of the Ten Rings	Destin Daniel Cretton	
2022	The Suicide Squad	James Gunn	
2022	Zack Snyder's Justice League	Zack Snyder	
2023	The Batman	Matt Reeves	
2023	Black Panther: Wakanda Forever	Ryan Coogler	
2023	DC League of Super-Pets	Jared Stern	
2023	Doctor Strange in the Multiverse of Madness	Sam Raimi	
2023	Thor: Love and Thunder	Taika Waititi	
2024	Spider-Man: Across the Spider-Verse	Joaquim Dos Santos, Kemp Powers and Justin K. Thompson	
2024	Blue Beetle	Ángel Manuel Soto	
2024	Guardians of the Galaxy Vol. 3	James Gunn	
2024	Nimona	Nick Bruno and Troy Quane	
2024	Teenage Mutant Ninja Turtles: Mutant Mayhem	Jeff Rowe and Kyler Spears	
2025	Deadpool & Wolverine	Shawn Levy	
2025	Captain America: Brave New World	Julius Onah	
2025	The People's Joker	Vera Drew	
2025	Robot Dreams	Pablo Berger	
2025	Thunderbolts*	Jake Schreier	
2025	Venom: The Last Dance	Kelly Marcel	
2026	Superman	James Gunn	
2026	Demon Slayer: Kimetsu no Yaiba – The Movie: Infinity Castle	Haruo Sotozaki	
2026	Exit 8	Genki Kawamura	
2026	The Fantastic Four: First Steps	Matt Shakman	
2026	Masters of the Universe	Travis Knight	
2026	Mortal Kombat II	Simon McQuoid	
2026	Supergirl	Craig Gillespie	

== Directors with multiple nominations ==
3 nominations

- James Gunn
