= Critics' Choice Super Award for Best Actor in an Action Movie =

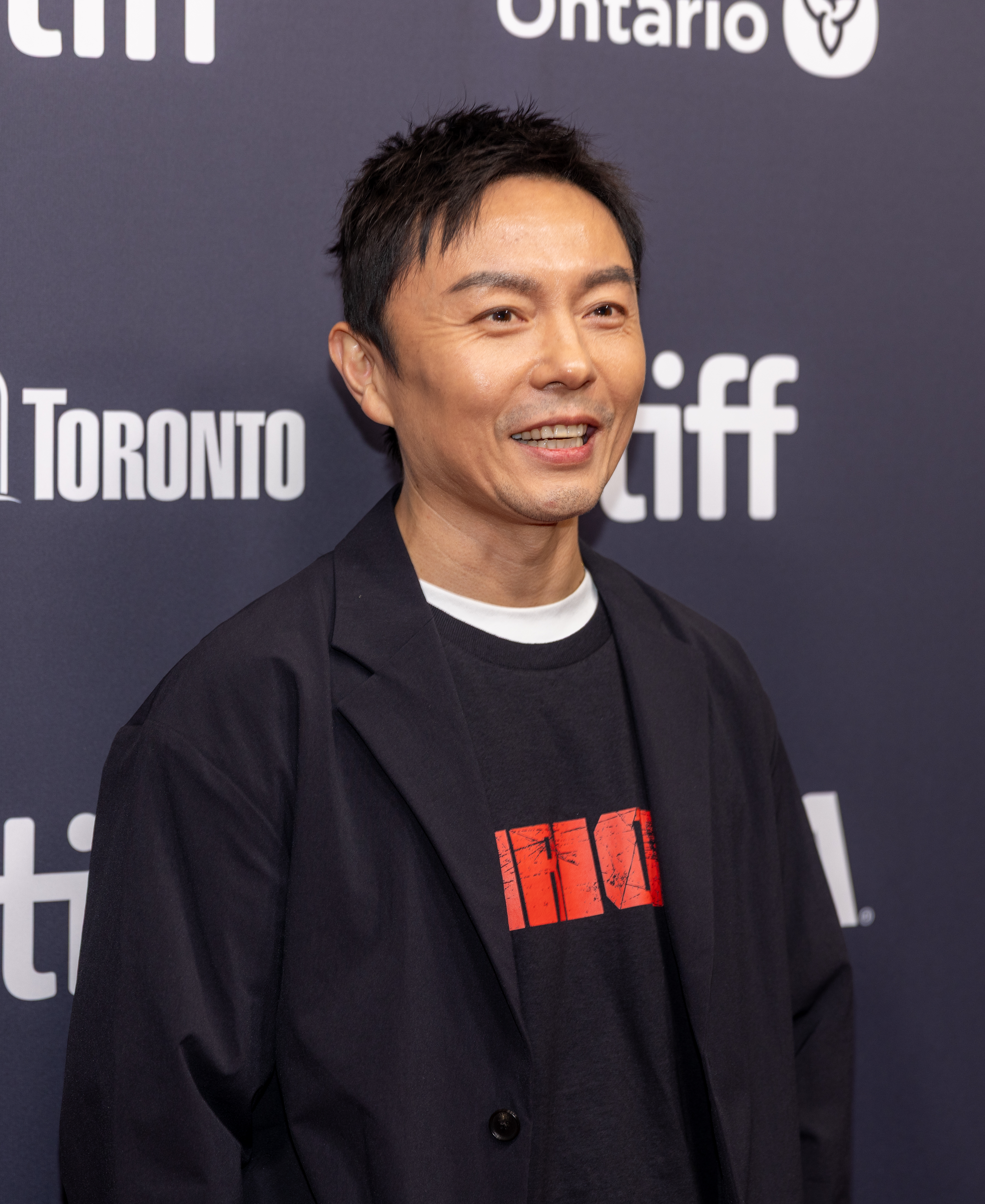
- The 2026 recipient: Xie Miao
- Country: United States
- Presented by: Critics Choice Association
- First award: 2021
- Currently held by: Xie Miao, The Furious (2026)

Highlights
- Most wins: Tom Cruise (3)
- Most nominations: Tom Cruise (3)
- Website: http://www.criticschoice.com/

The Critics' Choice Super Award for Best Actor in an Action Movie is an award presented by the Critics Choice Association to the best performance by an actor in an action film.

This award was first presented at the 1st Critics' Choice Super Awards in 2021 to Delroy Lindo for his role as Paul on Da 5 Bloods. The most nominated actor in this category is Tom Cruise with three consecutive nominations and wins.

The current recipient of the award is Xie Miao for his role as Wang Wei in The Furious.

== Winners and nominees ==
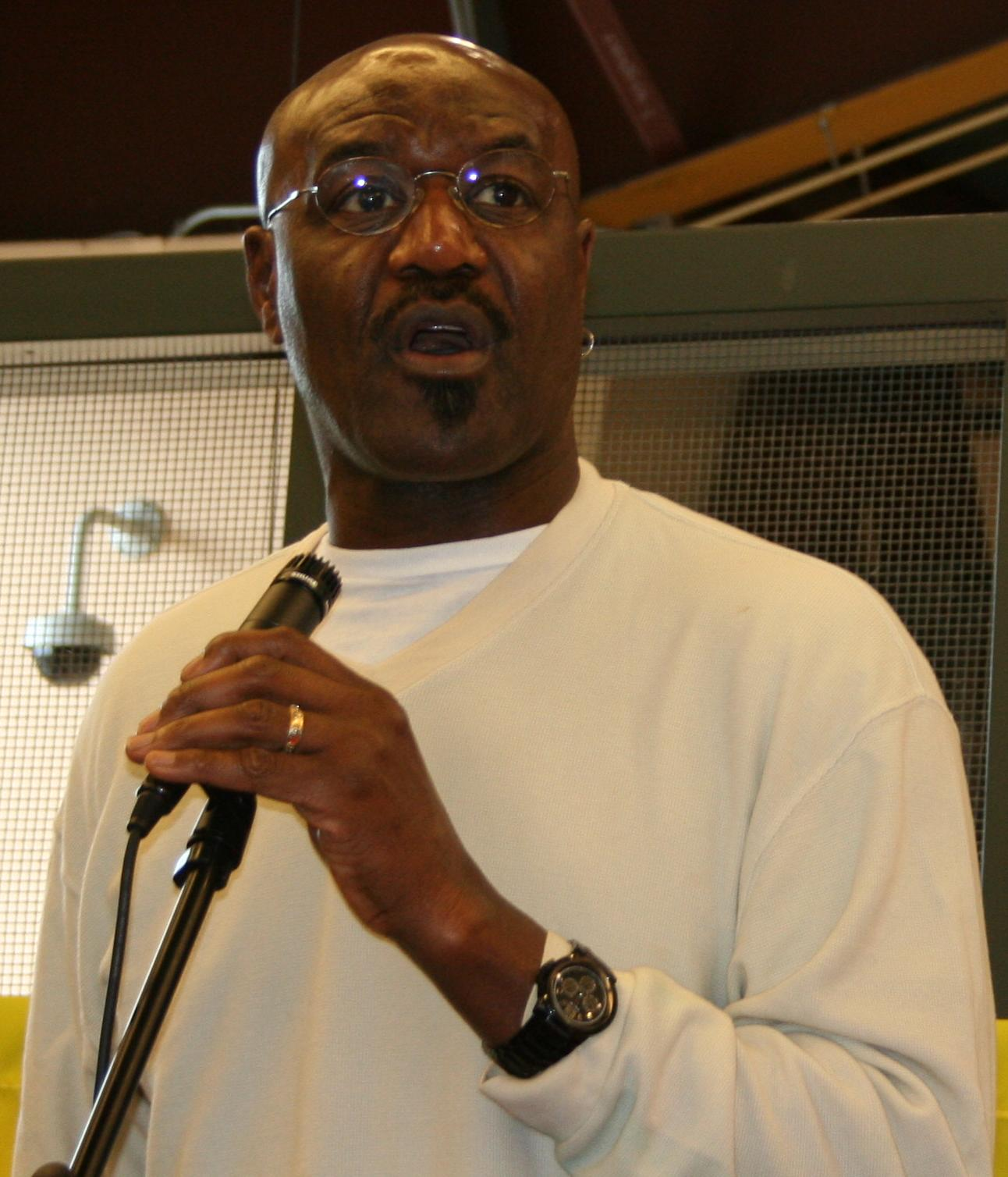
Delroy Lindo won for Da 5 Bloods (2020)

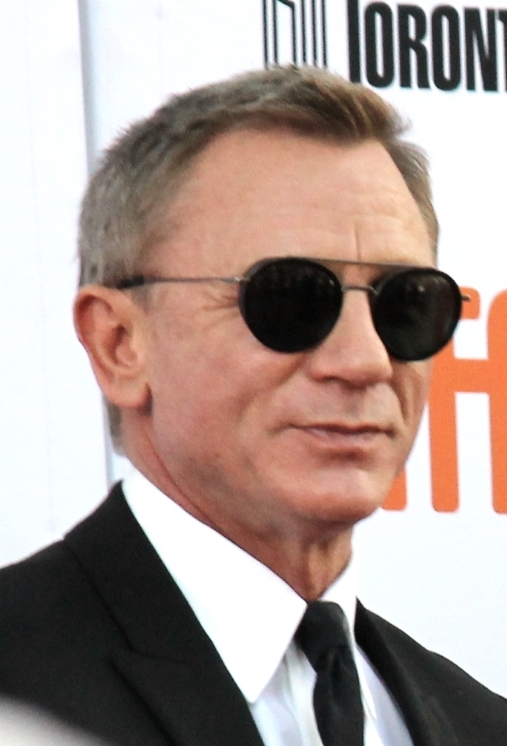
Daniel Craig won for No Time to Die (2021)

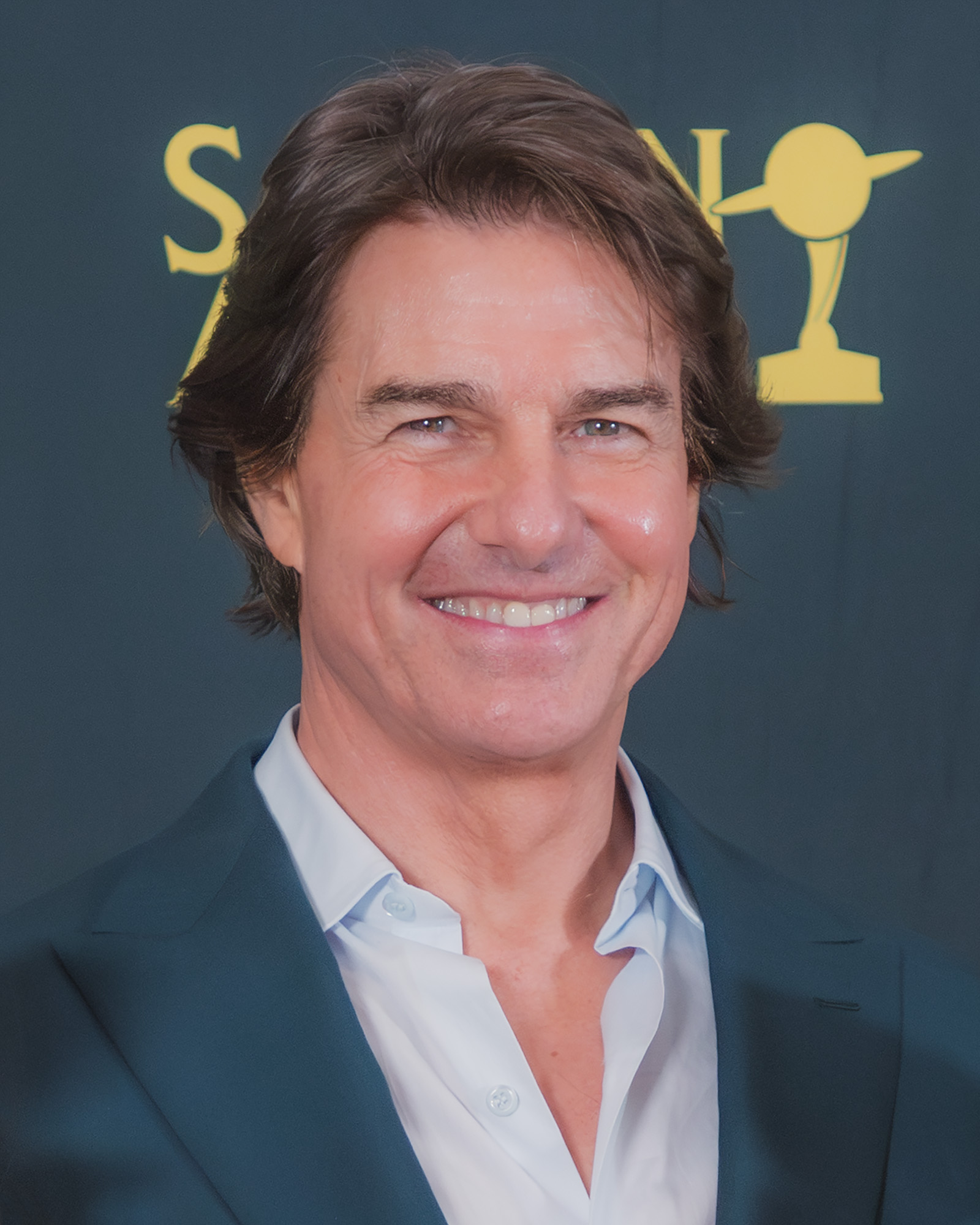
Tom Cruise won thrice for Top Gun: Maverick (2022), Mission: Impossible – Dead Reckoning Part One (2023) and Mission: Impossible – The Final Reckoning (2025)

=== 2020s ===
Year	Actor	Role(s)	Project(s)	Ref.
2021	Delroy Lindo	Paul	Da 5 Bloods	
2021	Tom Hanks	Commander Ernest Krause	Greyhound	
2021	Chris Hemsworth	Tyler Rake	Extraction	
2021	Caleb Landry Jones	Ty Michael Carter	The Outpost	
2021	Will Smith	Det. Lt. Michael Eugene "Mike" Lowrey	Bad Boys for Life	
2021	John David Washington	The Protagonist	Tenet	
2022	Daniel Craig	James Bond	No Time to Die	
2022	Dwayne Johnson	Frank Wolff	Jungle Cruise	
2022	Jonathan Majors	Nat Love	The Harder They Fall	
2022	Mads Mikkelsen	Markus Hansen	Riders of Justice	
2022	Bob Odenkirk	Hutch Mansell	Nobody	
2022	Liam Neeson	Mike McCann	The Ice Road	
2023	Tom Cruise	Pete "Maverick" Mitchell	Top Gun: Maverick	
2023	Nicolas Cage	Himself	The Unbearable Weight of Massive Talent	
2023	Ram Charan	Alluri Sitarama Raju	RRR	
2023	Brad Pitt	Ladybug	Bullet Train	
2023	N. T. Rama Rao Jr.	Komaram Bheem	RRR	
2024	Tom Cruise	Ethan Hunt	Mission: Impossible – Dead Reckoning Part One	
2024	Chris Hemsworth	Tyler Rake	Extraction 2	
2024	Keanu Reeves	John Wick	John Wick: Chapter 4	
2024	Denzel Washington	Robert McCall	The Equalizer 3	
2024	Donnie Yen	Caine	John Wick: Chapter 4	
2025	Tom Cruise	Ethan Hunt	Mission: Impossible – The Final Reckoning	
2025	Taron Egerton	Ethan Kopek	Carry-On	
2025	Ryan Gosling	Colt Seavers	The Fall Guy	
2025	Dev Patel	Kid	Monkey Man	
2025	Aaron Pierre	Terry Richmond	Rebel Ridge	
2025	Jack Quaid	Nathan "Novocaine" Caine	Novocaine	
2026	Xie Miao	Wang Wei	The Furious	
2026	Matt Damon	Lieutenant Dane Dumars	The Rip	
2026	Taron Egerton	Ben	Apex	
2026	Bob Odenkirk	Ulysses Richardson	Normal	
2026	Alan Ritchson	John Miller	Motor City	
2026	Joe Taslim	Navin	The Furious	
2026	Jorma Tommila	Aatami Korpi	Sisu: Road to Revenge	

== Performers with multiple wins ==
3 wins

- Tom Cruise (consecutive)

== Performers with multiple nominations ==
3 nominations

- Tom Cruise

2 nominations

- Taron Egerton
- Chris Hemsworth
- Bob Odenkirk

== See also ==
- Critics' Choice Super Award for Best Action Movie
- Critics' Choice Super Award for Best Actress in an Action Movie
