= 6th Critics' Choice Super Awards =

Film award

- Date: August 6, 2026
- Country: United States
- Most awards: Film: The Furious, Obsession, Project Hail Mary, Superman (2); Television: The Boys, Widow's Bay (3)
- Most nominations: Film: Superman (6); Television: The Boys (5)
- Website: www.criticschoice.com

The 6th Critics' Choice Super Awards, presented by the Critics Choice Association, honored the best in genre fiction film and television, including Superhero, Science Fiction/Fantasy, Horror and Action. The nominations were announced on July 15, 2026. The winners were announced on August 6, 2026.

Superman received the most film nominations with six while The Boys led all television nominations with five.

The Furious, Obsession, Project Hail Mary and Superman led all films with two wins each while The Boys and Widow's Bay led all television programs with three wins each.

== Winners and nominees ==
=== Film ===
Best Action Movie: The Furious; Mike & Nick & Nick & Alice; Motor City; The Naked Gun (Note: Won Best Comedy at the 31st Critics' Choice Awards); Normal; The Rip; Sisu: Road to Revenge
Best Actor in an Action Movie: Xie Miao – The Furious as Wang Wei; Matt Damon – The Rip as Lieutenant Dane Dumars; Taron Egerton – Apex as Ben; Bob Odenkirk – Normal as Ulysses Richardson; Alan Ritchson – Motor City as John Miller; Joe Taslim – The Furious as Navin; Jorma Tommila – Sisu: Road to Revenge as Aatami Korpi	Best Actress in an Action Movie: Charlize Theron – Apex as Sasha; Pamela Anderson – The Naked Gun as Beth Davenport; Priyanka Chopra Jonas – The Bluff as Ercell Bodden; Eiza González – Mike & Nick & Nick & Alice as Alice; Akari Takaishi – Ghost Killer as Fumika Matsuoka; Samara Weaving – Over Your Dead Body as Lisa; Maddie Ziegler – Pretty Lethal as Bones
Best Horror Movie: Obsession; 28 Years Later: The Bone Temple; Backrooms; The Long Walk; Send Help; Weapons
Best Actor in a Horror Movie: Ralph Fiennes – 28 Years Later: The Bone Temple as Dr. Ian Kelson; Josh Brolin – Weapons as Archer Graff; Chiwetel Ejiofor – Backrooms as Clark; Michael Johnston – Obsession as Baron "Bear" Bailey; David Jonsson – The Long Walk as Peter McVries #23; Jack O'Connell – 28 Years Later: The Bone Temple as Jimmy Crystal; Adam Scott – Hokum as Ohm Bauman	Best Actress in a Horror Movie: Inde Navarrette – Obsession as Nikki Freeman; Alison Brie – Together as Millie Wilson; Jessie Buckley – The Bride! as Ida / The Bride / Mary Shelley; Amy Madigan – Weapons as Gladys (Note: Won Best Supporting Actress at the 31st Critics' Choice Awards); Rachel McAdams – Send Help as Linda Liddle; Renate Reinsve – Backrooms as Dr. Mary Kline
Best Science Fiction/Fantasy Movie: Project Hail Mary; Bugonia (Note: Nominated for Best Picture at the 31st Critics' Choice Awards); Disclosure Day; Frankenstein; Good Luck, Have Fun, Don't Die; I Love Boosters; Predator: Badlands
Best Actor in a Science Fiction/Fantasy Movie: Ryan Gosling – Project Hail Mary as Ryland Grace; Jacob Elordi – Frankenstein as The Creature (Note: Won Best Supporting Actor at the 31st Critics' Choice Awards); Matt Johnson – Nirvanna the Band the Show the Movie as Matt; James Ortiz – Project Hail Mary as Rocky (voice); Jesse Plemons – Bugonia as Teddy Gatz; Sam Rockwell – Good Luck, Have Fun, Don't Die as The Man from the Future	Best Actress in a Science Fiction/Fantasy Movie: Emily Blunt – Disclosure Day as Margaret Fairchild; Oona Chaplin – Avatar: Fire and Ash as Varang; Elle Fanning – Predator: Badlands as Thia / Tessa; Sandra Hüller – Project Hail Mary as Eva Stratt; Keke Palmer – I Love Boosters as Corvette; Emma Stone – Bugonia as Michelle Fuller (Note: Nominated for Best Actress at the 31st Critics' Choice Awards)
Best Superhero Movie: Superman; Demon Slayer: Kimetsu no Yaiba – The Movie: Infinity Castle; Exit 8; The Fantastic Four: First Steps; Masters of the Universe; Mortal Kombat II; Supergirl
Best Actor in a Superhero Movie: David Corenswet – Superman as Clark Kent / Superman; Nicholas Galitzine – Masters of the Universe as Adam Glenn / He-Man; Edi Gathegi – Superman as Michael Holt / Mister Terrific; Nicholas Hoult – Superman as Lex Luthor; Kazunari Ninomiya – Exit 8 as Lost Man; Pedro Pascal – The Fantastic Four: First Steps as Reed Richards / Mister Fantastic	Best Actress in a Superhero Movie: Milly Alcock – Supergirl as Kara Zor-El / Supergirl; Rachel Brosnahan – Superman as Lois Lane; Julia Garner – The Fantastic Four: First Steps as Shalla-Bal / Silver Surfer; Vanessa Kirby – The Fantastic Four: First Steps as Sue Storm / Invisible Woman; Camila Mendes – Masters of the Universe as Teela; Adeline Rudolph – Mortal Kombat II as Kitana
Best Villain in a Movie: Amy Madigan – Weapons as Gladys; Oona Chaplin – Avatar: Fire and Ash as Varang; Nicholas Hoult – Superman as Lex Luthor; Michael Johnston – Obsession as Baron "Bear" Bailey; Jared Leto – Masters of the Universe as Skeletor

==== Special Honor ====
Best Good Boy in a Horror Movie
- Indy – Good Boy

=== Television ===
Best Action Series, Limited Series or Made-for-TV Movie: Task (Note: Nominated for Best Drama Series at the 31st Critics' Choice Awards); 9-1-1: Nashville; Boston Blue; Dark Winds; High Potential; Hijack; The Lowdown; Tracker
Best Actor in an Action Series, Limited Series or Made-for-TV Movie: Sterling K. Brown – Paradise as Xavier Collins (Note: Nominated for Best Actor in a Drama Series at the 31st Critics' Choice Awards); Idris Elba – Hijack as Sam Nelson; Ethan Hawke – The Lowdown as Lee Raybon; Zahn McClarnon – Dark Winds as Joe Leaphorn; Mark Ruffalo – Task as Tom Brandis; Scott Speedman – R.J. Decker as R.J. Decker	Best Actress in an Action Series, Limited Series or Made-for-TV Movie: Kaitlin Olson – High Potential as Morgan Gillory; Angela Bassett – 9-1-1 as Athena Grant; Julianne Nicholson – Paradise as Samantha "Sinatra" Redmond; Gloria Reuben – Boston Blue as Mae Silver; Octavia Spencer – Ride or Die as Debbie; Hannah Waddingham – Ride or Die as Judith
Best Horror Series, Limited Series or Made-for-TV Movie: Widow's Bay; The Beauty; The Boroughs; Devil in Disguise: John Wayne Gacy (Note: Nominated for Best Limited Series at the 31st Critics' Choice Awards); Dexter: Resurrection; Ghosts (Note: Nominated for Best Comedy Series at the 31st Critics' Choice Awards); It: Welcome to Derry; Wednesday
Best Actor in a Horror Series, Limited Series or Made-for-TV Movie: Matthew Rhys – Widow's Bay as Tom Loftis; Michael Chernus – Devil in Disguise: John Wayne Gacy as John Wayne Gacy (Note: Nominated for Best Actor in a Limited Series or Movie at the 31st Critics' Choice Awards); Michael C. Hall – Dexter: Resurrection as Dexter Morgan; Charlie Hunnam – Monster: The Ed Gein Story as Ed Gein; Alfred Molina – The Boroughs as Sam; Harold Perrineau – From as Boyd Stevens	Best Actress in a Horror Series, Limited Series or Made-for-TV Movie: Kate O'Flynn – Widow's Bay as Patricia Moyer; Toni Collette – Wayward as Evelyn Wade; Laurie Metcalf – Monster: The Ed Gein Story as Augusta Gein; Camila Morrone – Something Very Bad Is Going to Happen as Rachel Harkin; Jenna Ortega – Wednesday as Wednesday Addams; Taylour Paige – It: Welcome to Derry as Charlotte Hanlon
Best Science Fiction/Fantasy Series, Limited Series or Made-for-TV Movie: Pluribus; Alien: Earth; For All Mankind; House of the Dragon; A Knight of the Seven Kingdoms; Paradise; Silo; Star Trek: Strange New Worlds
Best Actor in a Science Fiction/Fantasy Series, Limited Series or Made-for-TV Movie: Sterling K. Brown – Paradise as Xavier Collins; Dexter Sol Ansell – A Knight of the Seven Kingdoms as Prince Aegon "Egg" Targaryen; Peter Claffey – A Knight of the Seven Kingdoms as Ser Duncan "Dunk" the Tall; Colin Farrell – Sugar as John Sugar; Timothy Olyphant – Alien: Earth as Kirsh; Matt Smith – House of the Dragon as Daemon Targaryen	Best Actress in a Science Fiction/Fantasy Series, Limited Series or Made-for-TV Movie: Rhea Seehorn – Pluribus as Carol Sturka (Note: Won Best Actress in a Drama Series at the 31st Critics' Choice Awards); Elizabeth Banks – The Miniature Wife as Lindy Littlejohn; Sydney Chandler – Alien: Earth as Wendy; Emma D'Arcy – House of the Dragon as Rhaenyra Targaryen; Rebecca Ferguson – Silo as Juliette Nichols; Holly Hunter – Star Trek: Starfleet Academy as Nahla Ake
Best Superhero Series, Limited Series or Made-for-TV Movie: The Boys (TIE); Spider-Noir (TIE); Daredevil: Born Again; Fallout; Gen V; Invincible; Peacemaker; Wonder Man
Best Actor in a Superhero Series, Limited Series or Made-for-TV Movie: Antony Starr – The Boys as Homelander; Yahya Abdul-Mateen II – Wonder Man as Simon Williams; Nicolas Cage – Spider-Noir as Ben Reilly / The Spider; John Cena – Peacemaker as Christopher Smith / Peacemaker; Walton Goggins – Fallout as The Ghoul / Cooper Howard; Hamish Linklater – Gen V as Cipher / Doug Brightbill	Best Actress in a Superhero Series, Limited Series or Made-for-TV Movie: Danielle Brooks – Peacemaker as Leota Adebayo (Note: Nominated for Best Supporting Actress in a Comedy Series at the 31st Critics' Choice Awards); Valorie Curry – The Boys as Firecracker; Colby Minifie – The Boys as Ashley Barrett; Annabel O'Hagan – Fallout as Stephanie Harper; Jaz Sinclair – Gen V as Marie Moreau; Deborah Ann Woll – Daredevil: Born Again as Karen Page
Best Villain in a Series, Limited Series or Made-for-TV Movie: Antony Starr – The Boys as Homelander; Macaulay Culkin – Fallout as Lacerta Legate; Peter Dinklage – Dexter: Resurrection as Leon Prater; Paul Giamatti – Star Trek: Starfleet Academy as Nustopher "Nus" Braka; Brendan Gleeson – Spider-Noir as Finbar "Finn" Byrne / Silvermane; Ewan Mitchell – House of the Dragon as Aemond Targaryen

== Most nominations ==
Films with multiple nominations
Title	Genre	Number of nominations
Superman	Superhero	6
The Fantastic Four: First Steps	Superhero	4
Masters of the Universe	Superhero	4
Obsession	Horror	4
Project Hail Mary	Science Fiction/Fantasy	4
Weapons	Horror	4
28 Years Later: The Bone Temple	Horror	3
Backrooms	Horror	3
Bugonia	Science Fiction/Fantasy	3
The Furious	Action	3
Apex	Action	2
Avatar: Fire and Ash	Science Fiction/Fantasy	2
Disclosure Day	Science Fiction/Fantasy	2
Exit 8	Superhero	2
Frankenstein	Science Fiction/Fantasy	2
Good Luck, Have Fun, Don't Die	Science Fiction/Fantasy	2
I Love Boosters	Science Fiction/Fantasy	2
The Long Walk	Horror	2
Mike & Nick & Nick & Alice	Action	2
Mortal Kombat II	Superhero	2
Motor City	Action	2
The Naked Gun	Action	2
Normal	Action	2
Predator: Badlands	Science Fiction/Fantasy	2
The Rip	Action	2
Send Help	Horror	2
Sisu: Road to Revenge	Action	2
Supergirl	Superhero	2

Television series with multiple nominations
Title	Genre	Number of nominations
The Boys	Superhero	5
Fallout	Superhero	4
House of the Dragon	Science Fiction/Fantasy	4
Paradise	Action; Science Fiction/Fantasy	4
Alien: Earth	Science Fiction/Fantasy	3
Dexter: Resurrection	Horror	3
Gen V	Superhero	3
A Knight of the Seven Kingdoms	Science Fiction/Fantasy	3
Peacemaker	Superhero	3
Spider-Noir	Superhero	3
Widow's Bay	Horror	3
The Boroughs	Horror	2
Boston Blue	Action	2
Daredevil: Born Again	Superhero	2
Dark Winds	Action	2
Devil in Disguise: John Wayne Gacy	Horror	2
High Potential	Action	2
Hijack	Action	2
It: Welcome to Derry	Horror	2
The Lowdown	Action	2
Monster: The Ed Gein Story	Horror	2
Pluribus	Science Fiction/Fantasy	2
Ride or Die	Action	2
Silo	Science Fiction/Fantasy	2
Star Trek: Starfleet Academy	Science Fiction/Fantasy	2
Task	Action	2
Wednesday	Horror	2
Wonder Man	Superhero	2

== See also ==
- 31st Critics' Choice Awards
