= Critics Choice Super Awards =

Annual film, television, and home media awards event

- Current: 6th Critics' Choice Super Awards
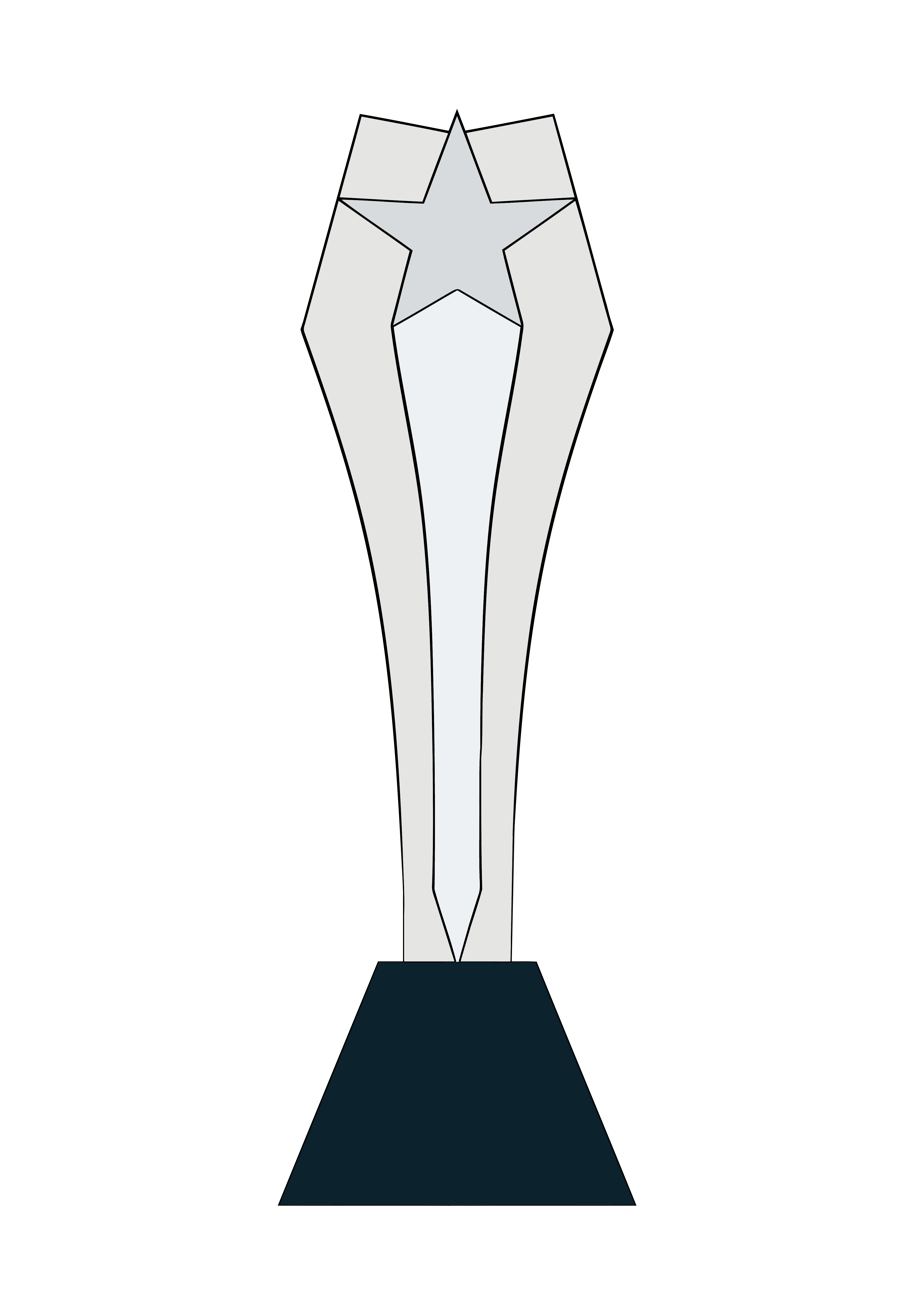
- Awarded for: The finest in genre fiction film, television and home media releases
- Country: United States
- Presented by: Critics Choice Association
- First award: 2021; 5 years ago
- Website: www.criticschoice.com

The Critics Choice Super Awards is an awards show presented annually by the Critics Choice Association to honor the finest in genre fiction film, television and home media releases, including action, superhero, horror, science fiction, fantasy and animation releases. They were first established in 2020, with the inaugural ceremony taking place on January 10, 2021, virtually, due to the COVID-19 pandemic.

== History ==
The awards were first announced on October 12, 2020 by the Critics Choice Association. According to the acting CEO of the Critics Choice Association, Joey Berlin, the Critics Choice Super Awards were created to "recognize the brilliance, creativity, and artistic excellence showcased in genres that, for far too long, have been overlooked by other award shows." The inaugural ceremony aired on the CW on January 10, 2021 and was produced by Bob Bain Productions.

== Categories ==
=== Film ===
- Best Action Movie
- Best Horror Movie
- Best Science Fiction/Fantasy Movie
- Best Superhero Movie (Note: Superhero categories also include comic book and video game-inspired films and series.)
- Best Actor in an Action Movie
- Best Actress in an Action Movie
- Best Actor in a Horror Movie
- Best Actress in a Horror Movie
- Best Actor in a Science Fiction/Fantasy Movie
- Best Actress in a Science Fiction/Fantasy Movie
- Best Actor in a Superhero Movie
- Best Actress in a Superhero Movie
- Best Villain in a Movie (across all genres)

=== Television ===
- Best Action Series
- Best Horror Series
- Best Science Fiction/Fantasy Series
- Best Superhero Series
- Best Actor in an Action Series
- Best Actress in an Action Series
- Best Actor in a Horror Series
- Best Actress in a Horror Series
- Best Actor in a Science Fiction/Fantasy Series
- Best Actress in a Science Fiction/Fantasy Series
- Best Actor in a Superhero Series
- Best Actress in a Superhero Series
- Best Villain in a Series (across all genres)

=== Retired awards ===
- Best Animated Movie
- Best Voice Actor in an Animated Movie
- Best Voice Actress in an Animated Movie
- Best Animated Series
- Best Voice Actor in an Animated Series
- Best Voice Actress in an Animated Series

== Ceremonies ==
| # | Date | Best Action | | Best Science Fiction / Fantasy | | Best Horror | | Best Superhero | | Ref. |
| # | Date | Movie | Series, Limited Series or Made-for-TV Movie | Movie | Series, Limited Series or Made-for-TV Movie | Movie | Series, Limited Series or Made-for-TV Movie | Movie | Series, Limited Series or Made-for-TV Movie | Ref. |
|---|---|---|---|---|---|---|---|---|---|---|
| 1st | January 10, 2021 | Da 5 Bloods | Vikings | Palm Springs | The Mandalorian | The Invisible Man | Lovecraft Country | The Old Guard | The Boys | |
| 2nd | March 17, 2022 | No Time to Die | Squid Game | Dune | Station Eleven | A Quiet Place Part II | Yellowjackets | Spider-Man: No Way Home | WandaVision | |
| 3rd | March 16, 2023 | Top Gun: Maverick | Cobra Kai | Everything Everywhere All at Once | Andor; Stranger Things | Barbarian | Wednesday | The Batman | The Boys | |
| 4th | April 4, 2024 | John Wick: Chapter 4 | Reacher | Godzilla Minus One | Black Mirror: "Joan Is Awful" | Talk to Me | The Last of Us | Spider-Man: Across the Spider-Verse | The Last of Us | |
| 5th | August 7, 2025 | Mission: Impossible – The Final Reckoning | Shōgun | Dune: Part Two | Andor | Sinners | The Last of Us | Deadpool & Wolverine | The Penguin | |
| 6th | August 6, 2026 | The Furious | Task | Project Hail Mary | Pluribus | Obsession | Widow's Bay | Superman | The Boys; Spider-Noir | |

== Superlatives ==
Movies with multiple awards
| Movie | Genre | Number of Awards |
|---|---|---|
| Everything Everywhere All at Once | Science Fiction/Fantasy | 3 |
| Palm Springs | Science Fiction/Fantasy | 3 |
| Soul | Animated | 3 |
| Spider-Man: No Way Home | Superhero | 3 |
| The Batman | Superhero | 2 |
| Birds of Prey | Superhero | 2 |
| Da 5 Bloods | Action | 2 |
| Deadpool & Wolverine | Superhero | 2 |
| Dune | Science Fiction/Fantasy | 2 |
| Dune: Part Two | Science Fiction/Fantasy | 2 |
| The Furious | Action | 2 |
| Godzilla Minus One | | 2 |
| The Invisible Man | Horror | 2 |
| Mission: Impossible – Dead Reckoning | Action | 2 |
| Mission: Impossible – The Final Reckoning | Action | 2 |
| No Time to Die | Action | 2 |
| Obsession | Horror | 2 |
| Pearl | Horror | 2 |
| Poor Things | Science Fiction/Fantasy | 2 |
| Project Hail Mary | Science Fiction/Fantasy | 2 |
| Sinners | Horror | 2 |
| Superman | Superhero | 2 |
| Talk to Me | Horror | 2 |
| Top Gun: Maverick | Action | 2 |

Series with multiple awards
| Series | Genre | Number of Awards |
|---|---|---|
| The Boys | Superhero | 10 |
| The Last of Us | Horror; Superhero | 9 |
| The Penguin | Superhero | 4 |
| Andor | Science Fiction/Fantasy | 3 |
| Severance | Science Fiction/Fantasy | 3 |
| Shōgun | Action | 3 |
| Squid Game | Action | 3 |
| WandaVision | Superhero | 3 |
| Widow's Bay | Horror | 3 |
| Black Mirror | Science Fiction/Fantasy | 2 |
| BoJack Horseman | Animated | 2 |
| Lovecraft Country | Horror | 2 |
| Paradise | Action; Science Fiction/Fantasy | 2 |
| Pluribus | Science Fiction/Fantasy | 2 |
| Snowpiercer | Action; Science Fiction/Fantasy | 2 |
| Station Eleven | Science Fiction/Fantasy | 2 |
| Wednesday | Horror | 2 |
| Yellowjackets | Horror | 2 |

Actors with multiple awards
| Actor | Number of Awards |
|---|---|
| Antony Starr | 6 |
| Tom Cruise | 3 |
| Colin Farrell | 3 |
| Pedro Pascal | 3 |
| Angela Bassett | 2 |
| Sterling K. Brown | 2 |
| Daveed Diggs | 2 |
| Rebecca Ferguson | 2 |
| Ralph Fiennes | 2 |
| Mia Goth | 2 |
| Melanie Lynskey | 2 |
| Cristin Milioti | 2 |
| Florence Pugh | 2 |
| Bella Ramsey | 2 |

== See also ==
- Critics' Choice Movie Awards
- Critics' Choice Television Awards
- Saturn Awards
