= Critics' Choice Super Award for Best Actress in an Action Movie =

Annual US film award

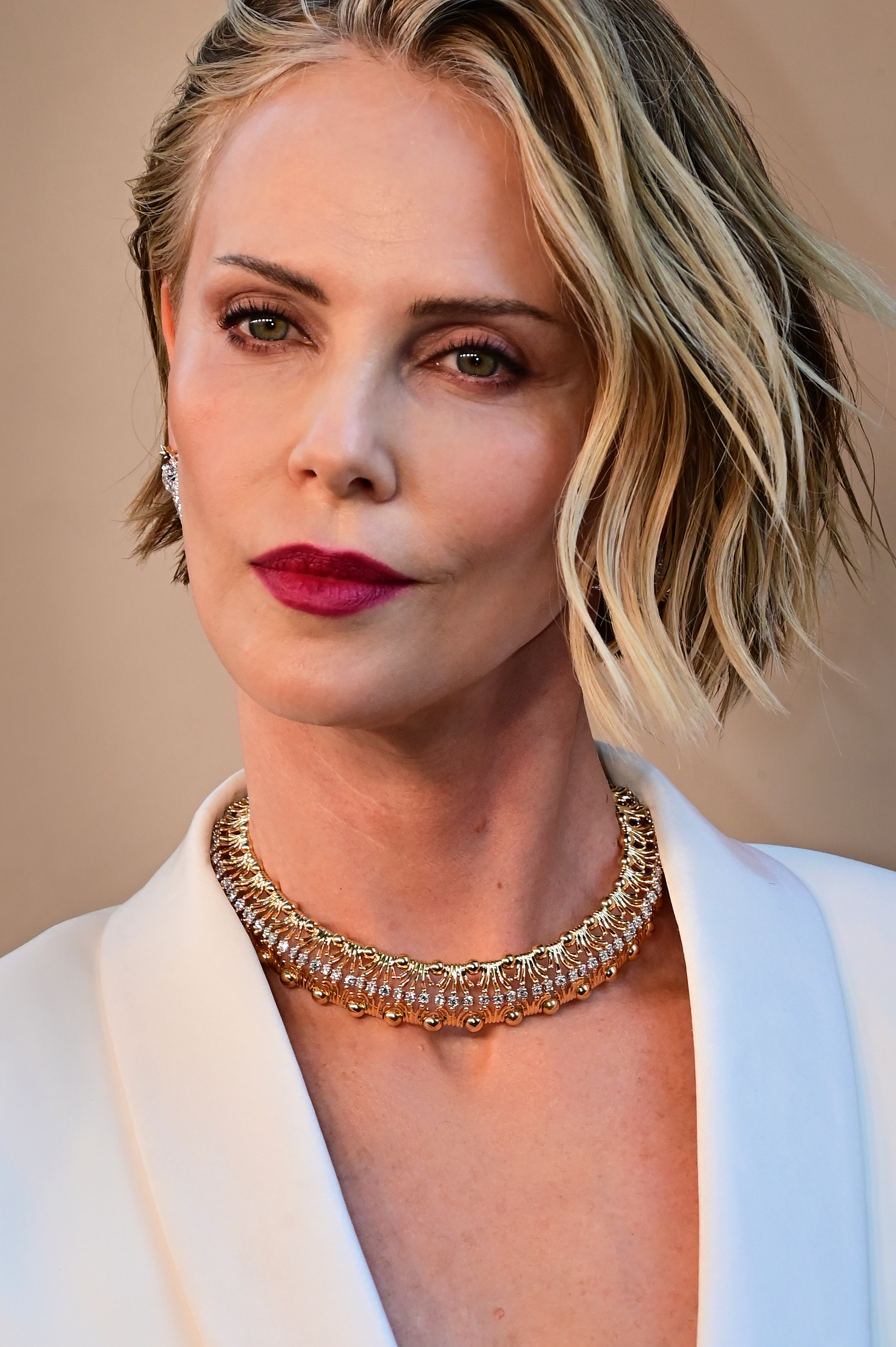
- The 2026 recipient: Charlize Theron
- Country: United States
- Presented by: Critics Choice Association
- First award: 2021
- Currently held by: Charlize Theron, Apex (2026)

Highlights
- Most nominations: Ana de Armas; Joey King; (2)
- Website: http://www.criticschoice.com/

The Critics' Choice Super Award for Best Actress in an Action Movie is an award presented by the Critics Choice Association to the best performance by an actress in an action film.

This award was first presented at the 1st Critics' Choice Super Awards in 2021 to Betty Gilpin for her role as Crystal Creasey in The Hunt. The most nominated actresses in this category are Ana de Armas and Joey King, with two nominations each.

The current recipient of the award is Charlize Theron for her role as Sasha in Apex.

== Winners and nominees ==
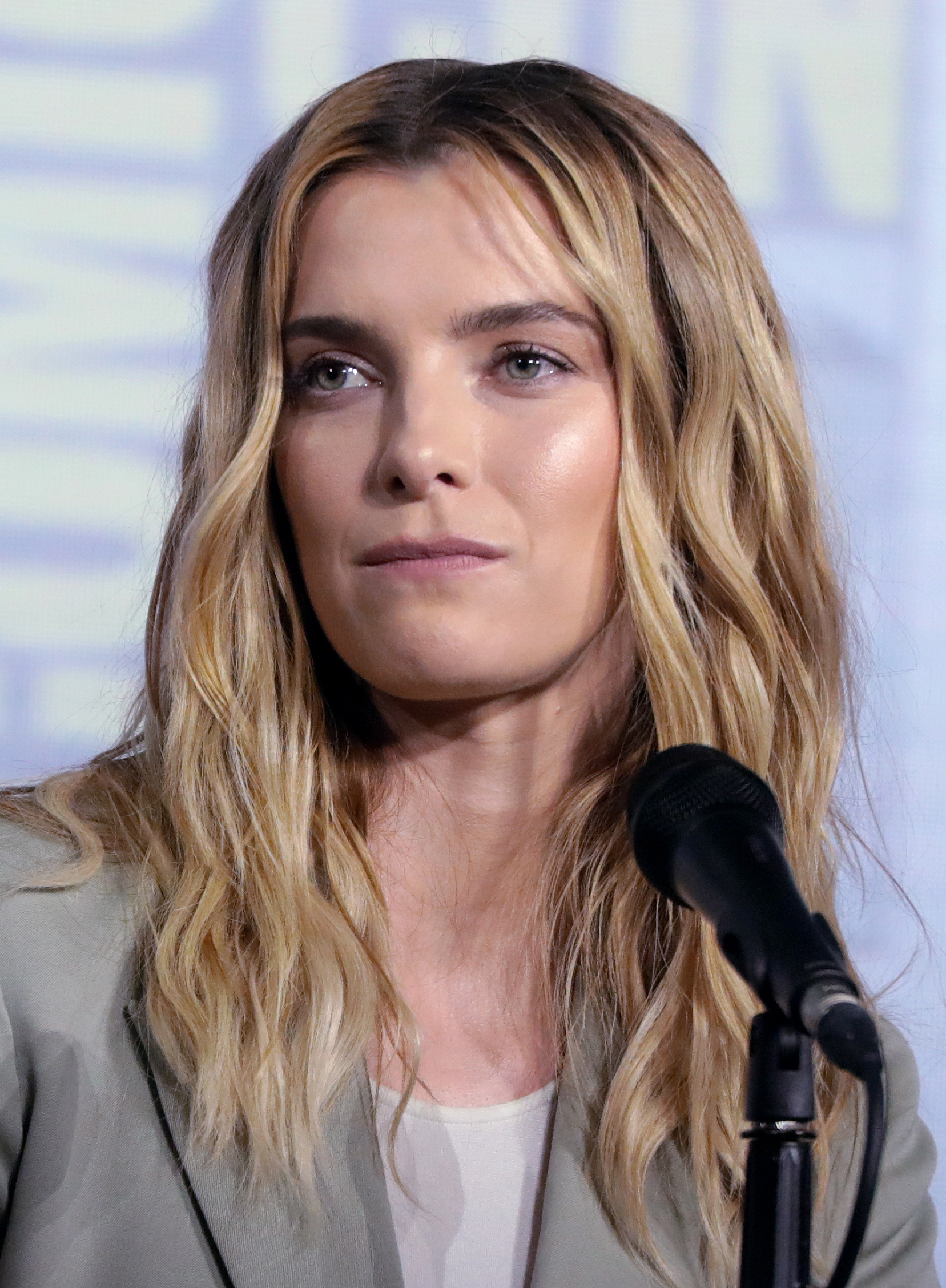
Betty Gilpin won for The Hunt (2020)

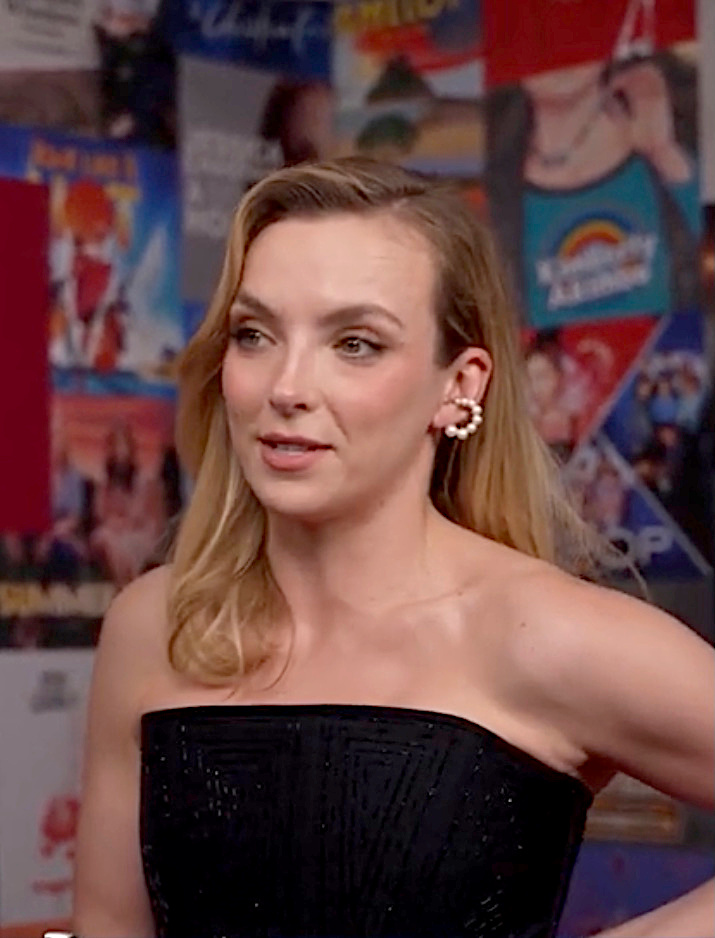
Jodie Comer won for The Last Duel (2021)

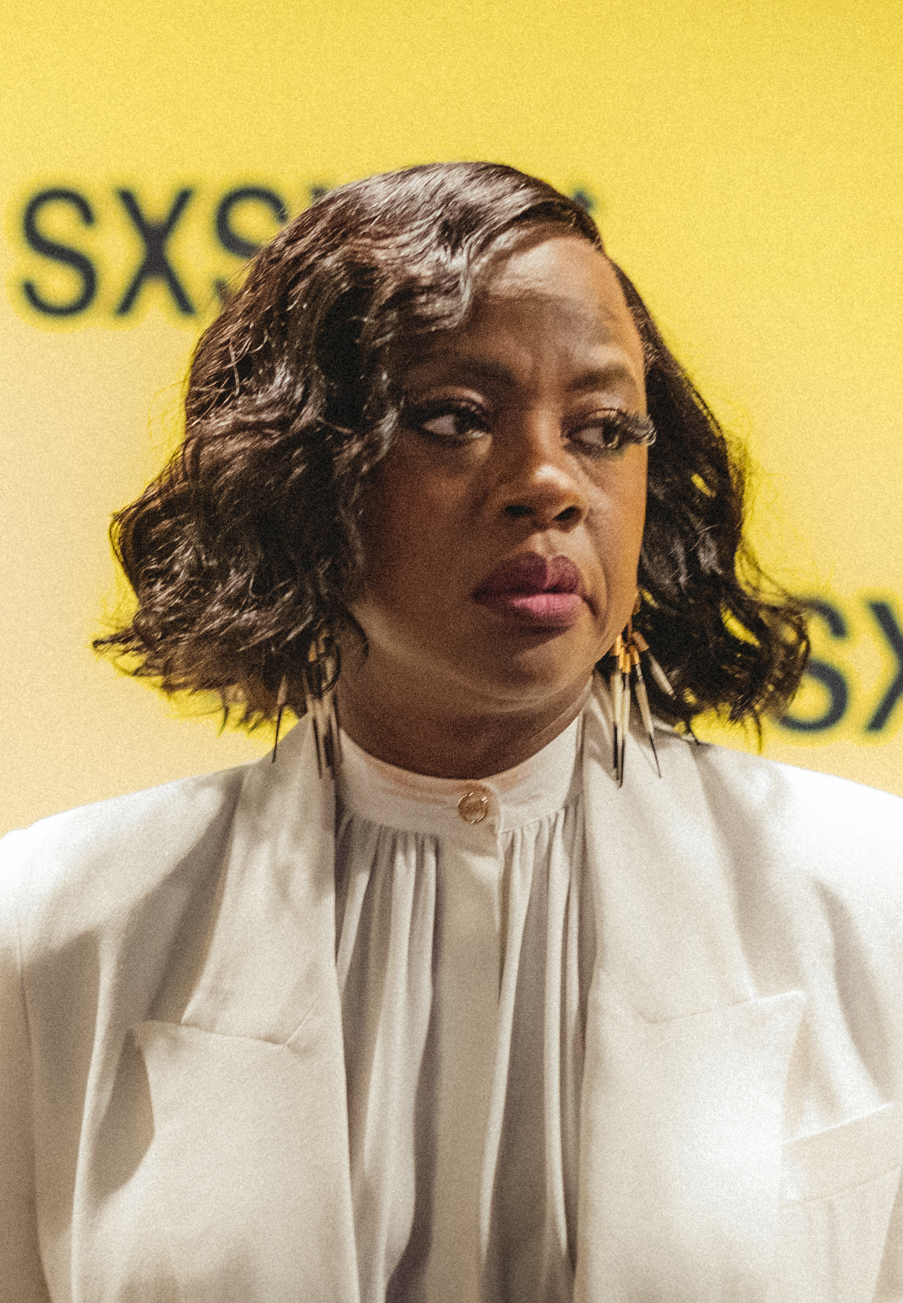
Viola Davis won for The Woman King (2022)

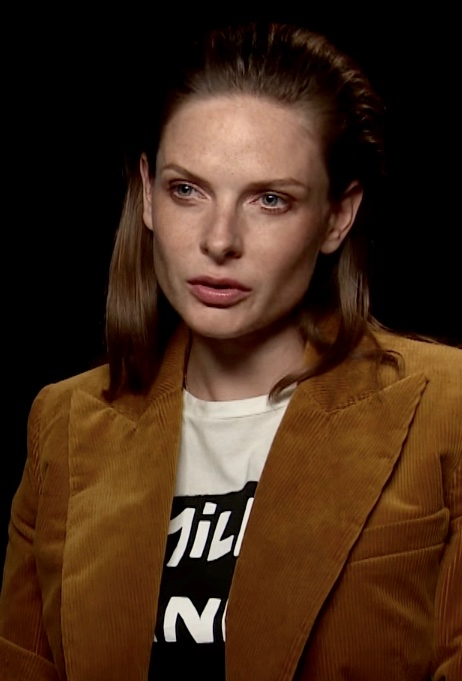
Rebecca Ferguson won for Mission: Impossible – Dead Reckoning Part One (2023)

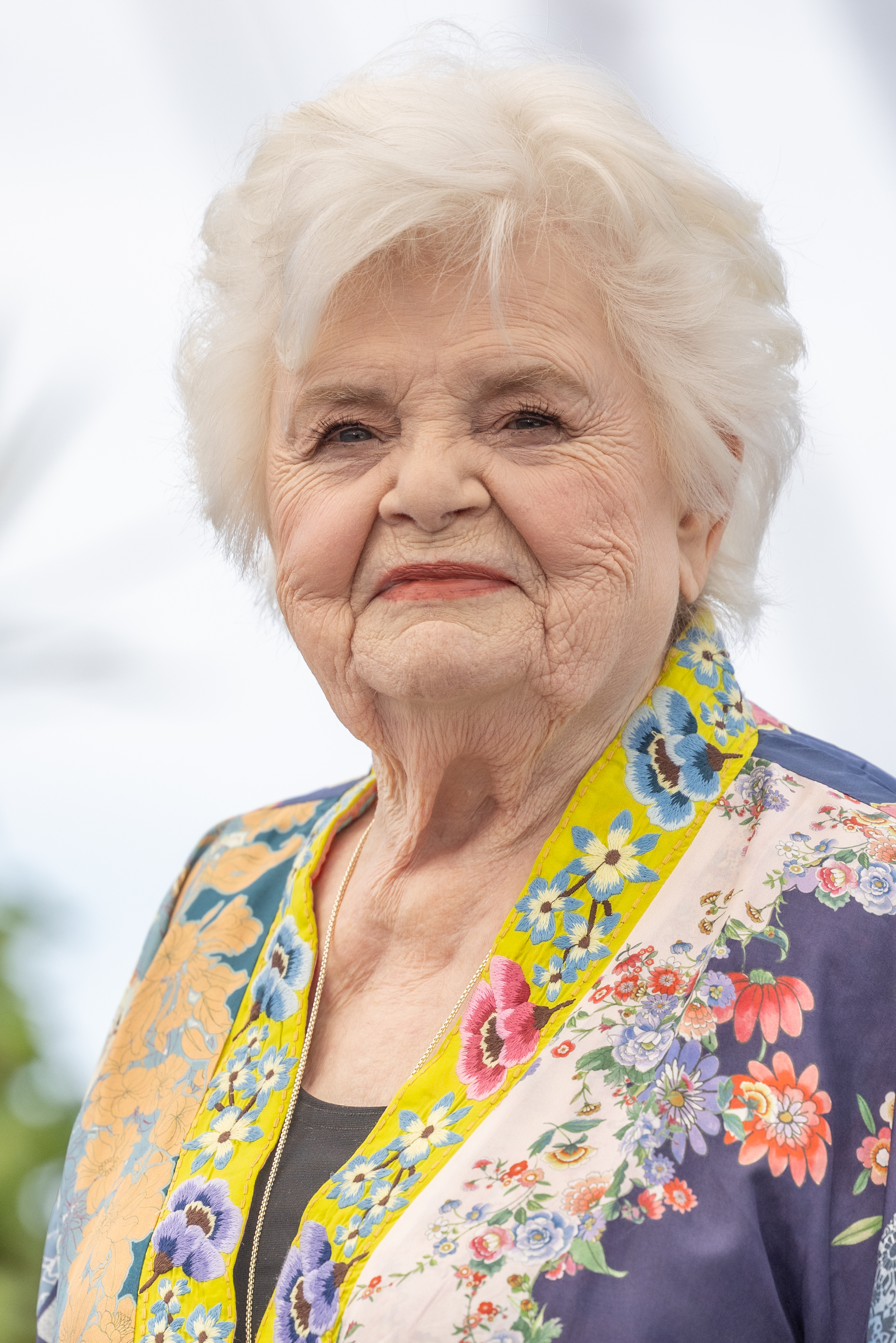
June Squibb won for Thelma (2024)

=== 2020s ===
| Year | Actor | Role(s) | Project(s) | Ref. |
|---|---|---|---|---|
| 2021 | Betty Gilpin | Crystal Creasey | The Hunt | |
| 2021 | Yifei Liu | Mulan | Mulan | |
| 2021 | Blake Lively | Stephanie Patrick | The Rhythm Section | |
| 2021 | Iliza Shlesinger | Cissy Davis | Spenser Confidential | |
| 2021 | Hilary Swank | Athena Stone | The Hunt | |
| 2022 | Jodie Comer | Marguerite de Carrouges | The Last Duel | |
| 2022 | Ana de Armas | Paloma | No Time to Die | |
| 2022 | Karen Gillan | Sam | Gunpowder Milkshake | |
| 2022 | Regina King | Trudy Smith | The Harder They Fall | |
| 2022 | Lashana Lynch | Nomi | No Time to Die | |
| 2022 | Maggie Q | Anna Dutton | The Protégé | |
| 2023 | Viola Davis | General Nanisca | The Woman King | |
| 2023 | Sandra Bullock | Loretta Sage | The Lost City | |
| 2023 | Jennifer Connelly | Penelope "Penny" Benjamin | Top Gun: Maverick | |
| 2023 | Joey King | The Prince | Bullet Train | |
| 2023 | Joey King | The Princess | The Princess | |
| 2024 | Rebecca Ferguson | Ilsa Faust | Mission: Impossible – Dead Reckoning Part One | |
| 2024 | Hayley Atwell | Grace | Mission: Impossible – Dead Reckoning Part One | |
| 2024 | Priya Kansara | Ria Khan | Polite Society | |
| 2024 | Pom Klementieff | Paris | Mission: Impossible – Dead Reckoning Part One | |
| 2024 | Rina Sawayama | Shimazu Akira | John Wick: Chapter 4 | |
| 2025 | June Squibb | Thelma | Thelma | |
| 2025 | Emily Blunt | Jody Moreno | The Fall Guy | |
| 2025 | Ana de Armas | Eve Macarro | From the World of John Wick: Ballerina | |
| 2025 | Kirsten Dunst | Lee Smith | Civil War | |
| 2025 | Cailee Spaeny | Jessie Collin | Civil War | |
| 2025 | Anya Taylor-Joy | Imperator Furiosa | Furiosa: A Mad Max Saga | |
| 2026 | Charlize Theron | Sasha | Apex | |
| 2026 | Pamela Anderson | Beth Davenport | The Naked Gun | |
| 2026 | Priyanka Chopra Jonas | Ercell Bodden | The Bluff | |
| 2026 | Eiza González | Alice | Mike & Nick & Nick & Alice | |
| 2026 | Akari Takaishi | Fumika Matsuoka | Ghost Killer | |
| 2026 | Samara Weaving | Lisa | Over Your Dead Body | |
| 2026 | Maddie Ziegler | Bones | Pretty Lethal | |

== Performers with multiple nominations ==
2 nominations

- Ana de Armas
- Joey King

== See also ==
- Critics' Choice Super Award for Best Action Movie
- Critics' Choice Super Award for Best Actor in an Action Movie
