= The New Legend of Shaolin =

1994 Hong Kong film by Wong Jing and Corey Yuen

- Film poster
- Directed by: Wong Jing; Corey Yuen
- Written by: Wong Jing
- Produced by: Helen Li; Jet Li; Pei Hsiang-chuan; Shia Wai-sum
- Starring: Jet Li; Miu Tse; Chingmy Yau; Deannie Yip; Ji Chunhua
- Cinematography: Tom Lau
- Edited by: Angie Lam
- Music by: Eckart Seeber
- Production company: Eastern Production
- Distributed by: Eastern Production
- Release date: 3 March 1994
- Running time: 94 minutes
- Country: Hong Kong
- Language: Cantonese
- Box office: HK$19,388,051

The New Legend of Shaolin (Chinese: 洪熙官之少林五祖; pinyin: Hóng Xīguān Zhī Shàolín Wǔ Zǔ; released in the United Kingdom as Legend of the Red Dragon and in the Philippines as Once Upon a Time in China-4) is a 1994 Hong Kong martial arts film directed by Wong Jing and Corey Yuen. The film stars and is produced by Jet Li. The film showcases Hung Hei-kwun's exploits as a rebel against the Qing government, and it is one of two films in which Li and Miu Tse play a father-son duo, the other being My Father Is a Hero. The film was released theatrically in Hong Kong on 3 March 1994. The film also pays homage to the Japanese film Lone Wolf and Cub: Sword of Vengeance, with the opening scene being a parody of said film, while also having a similar plot of a father going on a journey of revenge with his infant son.

== Plot ==
Rebel Hung Hei-kwun arrives in his village only to find it destroyed from a raid by government soldiers. Hung Hei-kwun rescues the sole survivor, his infant son, and the two prepare to go on the run before encountering fellow rebel Ma Ling-yee. Ma Ling-yee suddenly attacks Hei-kwun as government soldiers appear, and reveals that he betrayed Hung Hei-kwun and the village for the bounty on Hei-kwun's head. Hung Hei-kwun kills the soldiers and leaves Ma Ling-yee for dead.

Several years later, Hung Hei-kwun and Man-ting, now a young boy, are in a village with very little money. Nearby, a woman named Red Bean and her mother are running a con: Red Bean weeps over her mother, who is playing dead, and calls for a man's marriage proposal to fund the mother's burial costs. The wealthy but gullible Ma-Kai-sin propositions Red Bean. Hei-kwun tries to leave his son in the care of his brother but is betrayed, forcing him to kill his brother and more soldiers. Ma Kai-sin, witnessing the carnage done by Kwun, hires Hung Hei-Kwun as a bodyguard. Ma Kai-sin leads Hei-kwun and son, and Red Bean and mother, home to his mansion.

At Shaolin, monks tattoo parts of a treasure map onto the backs of five pupils who are then sent away to keep the map safe. The government, in pursuit of the map, attacks Shaolin with soldiers and Ma Ling-yee, who had survived by being dipped in poison and transformed into a disgusting creature. The soldiers massacre Shaolin, while Ma Ling-yee himself kills the abbot. They learn that the five pupils are at Ma Kai-sin's village.

At Ma Kai-sin's mansion, Red Bean and her mother plan to rob the place and leave. Red Bean sees Hung Hei-kwun as a threat to her plans and tries to kill him. They fight, and Red Bean is defeated. Hung Hei-kwun warns her not to cause any trouble. Man-ting accuses his father of having fallen in love with Red Bean because he spared her life. Meanwhile, Kai-sin's son, Ma Chiew-Heng, begins to bully Man-ting, but is beaten by Man-ting's superior Kung Fu. Chiew-Heng, who has part of the map tattooed on his back, calls upon his four Shaolin friends (who have the other parts of the map) to help him beat up Man-ting. Man-ting defeats all of the boys, earning him their respect and friendship. At night, Red Bean and mother attempt to rob Ma Kai-sin, but are thwarted by Hung Hei-kwun who defeats them in a fight.

On the Lunar New Year, Ma Ling-yee and government soldiers arrive at the village and attack Ma Kai-sin's mansion. During the melee, Ma Ling-yee fights Hung Hei-kwun, Man-ting and all the pupils except Ma Chiew-Heng are captured, and Red Bean is injured. Ma Kai-sin plays dead and falls asleep, while the rest of the group retreats. Hung Hei-kwun proposes marriage to Red Bean after treating her wounds, and she accepts. The group tracks the five boys down and Hung Hei-kwun rescues them, before fighting Ma Ling-yee. Man-ting joins his dad and together they blow up Ma Ling-yee using dynamite.

The group travels to the Red Flower Pavilion seeking a rumored Shaolin master. They are provided safe haven by friendly rebels led by Sung Young Chen. Sung Young Chen and his rebels are killed in an attack by Ma Ling-yee, who survived, and government soldiers attack. Red Bean's mother rescues the boys from a dart attack, but is fatally wounded. Ma Ling-yee attacks while they are mourning Red Bean's mother. Hung Hei-kwun and Man-ting fight Ma Ling-yee, assisted briefly by the Shaolin master who had previously appeared in the guise of a wax statue maker. Eventually Hung Hei-kwun kills Ma Ling-yee by kicking him into a vat of acid.

The group goes back to town, with each of the Shaolin pupils returned to their parents. Hung Hei-kwun, Man-ting, and Red Bean leave together as a family.

== Cast ==
- Jet Li as Hung Hei-kwun
- Chen Sung-yung as Ma Kai-sin
- Damian Lau as Chan Kan-nam
- Ji Chunhua as Ma Ling-yee
- Miu Tse as Hung Man-ting
- Wang Lung-wei as Commander
- Chingmy Yau as Red Bean
- Deannie Yip as Red Bean's Mother
- Chu Ke-liang as Cheung
- Wong Jing as Fong Sai-yuk (cameo)
- Eric Tsang as Man in Crown (uncredited)

== Release ==
The New Legend of Shaolin was released in Hong Kong on 3 March 1994. In the Philippines, the film was released as Once Upon a Time in China-4 by Solar Films on 22 September 1994.

=== Critical response ===
David Rooney of Variety called it "a high-kicking historical revenge spectacular" that is "a nonstop crowd-pleaser". Mick LaSalle of the San Francisco Chronicle wrote that film will appeal to hardcore fans, but the well-executed actions scenes eventually become monotonous.

== See also ==
- Jet Li filmography
- List of Hong Kong films
- Lone Wolf and Cub
