= Critics' Choice Super Award for Best Villain in a Movie =

Film award category

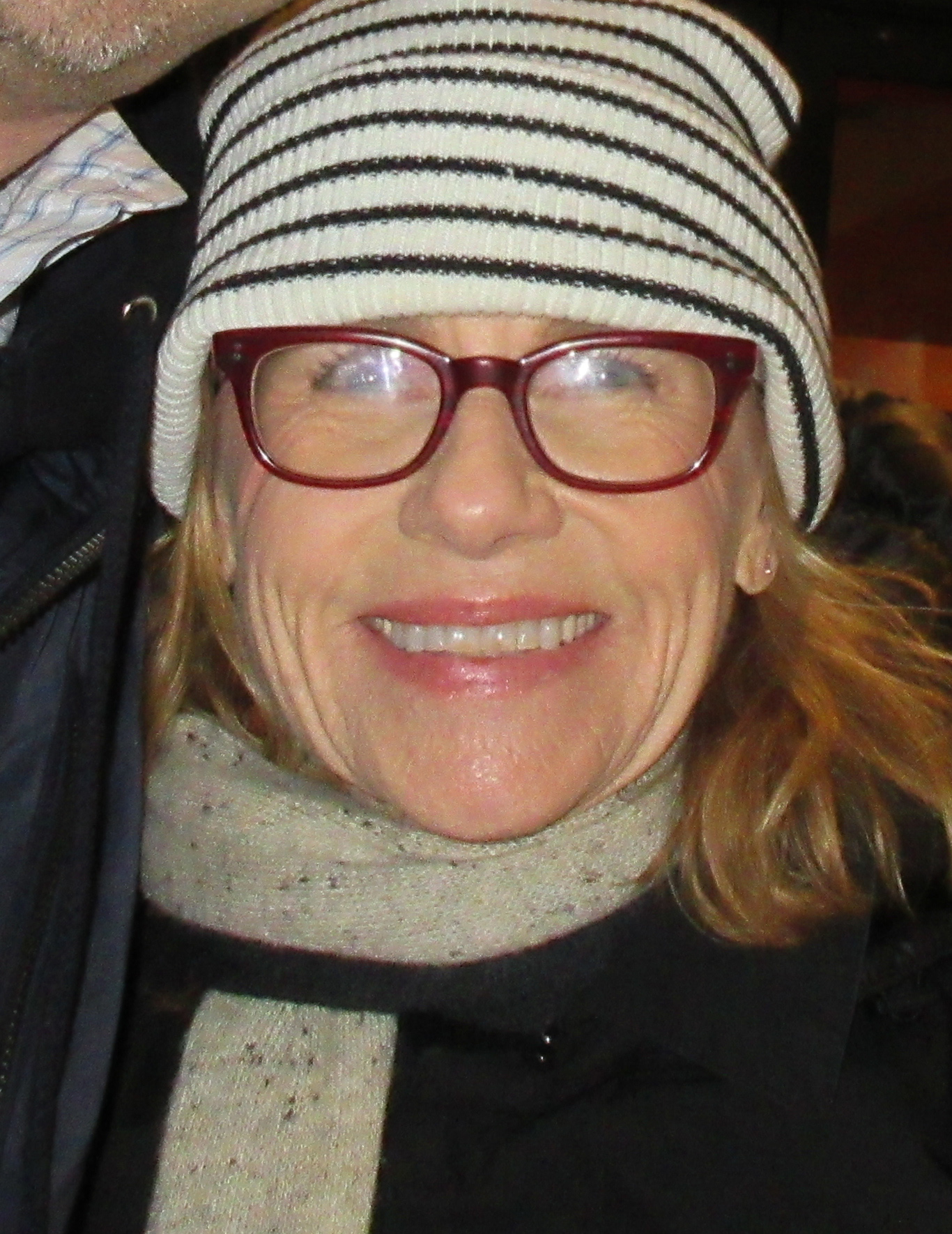
- The 2026 recipient: Amy Madigan
- Country: United States
- First award: 2021
- Currently held by: Amy Madigan, Weapons (2026)
- Website: http://www.criticschoice.com/

The Critics' Choice Super Award for Best Villain in a Movie is an award presented by the Critics Choice Association to the best villain in a film.

This award was first presented in 2021 to Jim Carrey for his role as Dr. Robotnik in Sonic the Hedgehog.

The current recipient of the award is Amy Madigan for her role as Aunt Gladys in Weapons.

== Winners and nominees ==
Year	Performer	Role(s)	Project(s)
2021	Jim Carrey	Dr. Robotnik	Sonic the Hedgehog
2021	Kathryn Newton	Millie Kessler	Freaky
2021	Martin Short and Jane Krakowski	Walter Willoughby and Helga Willoughby	The Willoughbys
2021	J. K. Simmons	Roy Schlieffen	Palm Springs
2021	Hilary Swank	Athena Stone	The Hunt
2022	Willem Dafoe	Norman Osborn / Green Goblin	Spider-Man: No Way Home
2022	Ben Affleck	Count Pierre Alençon	The Last Duel
2022	Idris Elba	Rufus Buck	The Harder They Fall
2022	Tony Leung Chiu-wai	Xu Wenwu	Shang-Chi and the Legend of the Ten Rings
2022	Marina Mazepa and Ray Chase	Gabriel	Malignant
2022	Tony Todd	Daniel Robitaille / Candyman	Candyman
2023	Mia Goth	Pearl	Pearl
2023	Paul Dano	Edward Nashton / The Riddler	The Batman
2023	Tenoch Huerta	Namor	Black Panther: Wakanda Forever
2023	Joey King	The Prince	Bullet Train
2023	Elizabeth Olsen	Wanda Maximoff / Scarlet Witch	Doctor Strange in the Multiverse of Madness
2023	Mark Rylance	Sully	Bones and All
2024	–	Godzilla	Godzilla Minus One
2024	Chukwudi Iwuji	The High Evolutionary	Guardians of the Galaxy Vol. 3
2024	Amie Donald and Jenna Davis	M3GAN	M3GAN
2024	Jason Momoa	Dante Reyes	Fast X
2024	Alyssa Sutherland	Ellie	Evil Dead Rise
2025	Hugh Grant	Mr. Reed	Heretic
2025	Austin Butler	Feyd-Rautha	Dune: Part Two
2025	Emma Corrin	Cassandra Nova	Deadpool & Wolverine
2025	Jack O'Connell	Remmick	Sinners
2025	Lewis Pullman	Robert "Bob" Reynolds / Sentry / Void	Thunderbolts*
2025	Denzel Washington	Macrinus	Gladiator II
2026	Amy Madigan	Aunt Gladys	Weapons
2026	Oona Chaplin	Varang	Avatar: Fire and Ash
2026	Nicholas Hoult	Lex Luthor	Superman
2026	Michael Johnston	Baron "Bear" Bailey	Obsession
2026	Jared Leto	Skeletor	Masters of the Universe
