= Critics' Choice Super Award for Best Actor in an Action Series =

Television series award

Critics' Choice Super Award for Best Actor in an Action Series, Limited Series or Made-for-TV Movie
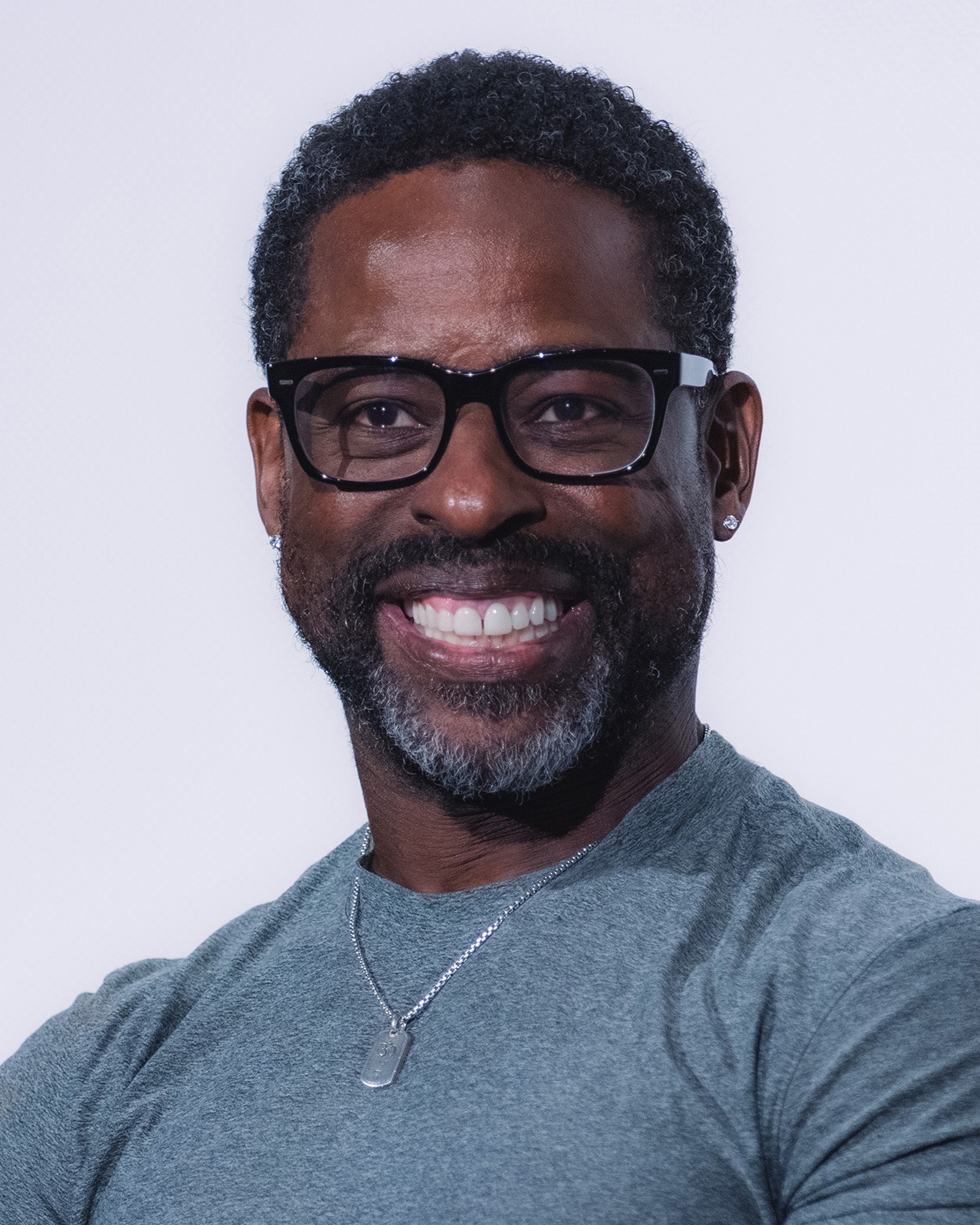
- The 2026 recipient: Sterling K. Brown
- Country: United States
- Presented by: Critics Choice Association
- First award: 2021
- Currently held by: Sterling K. Brown, Paradise (2026)

Highlights
- Most nominations: Alan Ritchson (3)
- Website: http://www.criticschoice.com/

The Critics' Choice Super Award for Best Actor in an Action Series, Limited Series or Made-for-TV Movie is an award presented by the Critics Choice Association to the best performance by an actor in an action television series or TV-movie.

This award was first presented in 2021 to Daveed Diggs for his role as Andre Layton on Snowpiercer.

The current recipient of the award is Sterling K. Brown for his role as Xavier Collins in Paradise.

== Winners and nominees ==
Year	Actor	Role	Series	Network	Ref
Best Actor in an Action Series
2021	Daveed Diggs	Andre Layton	Snowpiercer	TNT	
2021	Andrew Koji	Ah Sahm	Warrior	Cinemax	
2021	Logan Lerman	Jonah Heidelbaum	Hunters	Amazon Prime Video	
2021	Alexander Ludwig	Bjorn Ironside	Vikings	History	
2021	Shemar Moore	Sergeant II Daniel "Hondo" Harrelson Jr.	S.W.A.T.	CBS	
2021	Al Pacino	Meyer Offerman	Hunters	TNT	
2022	Lee Jung-jae	Seong Gi-hun	Squid Game	Netflix	
2022	Mike Faist	Dodge Mason	Panic	Amazon Prime Video	
2022	Alexander Ludwig	Ace Spade	Heels	Starz	
2022	Ralph Macchio	Daniel LaRusso	Cobra Kai	Netflix	
2022	Omar Sy	Assane Diop	Lupin	The CW	
2022	William Zabka	Johnny Lawrence	Cobra Kai	Netflix	
Best Actor in an Action Series, Limited Series or Made-for-TV Movie
2023	Kevin Costner	John Dutton	Yellowstone	Paramount Network	
2023	John Krasinski	Jack Ryan	Tom Clancy's Jack Ryan	Amazon Prime Video	
2023	Ralph Macchio	Daniel LaRusso	Cobra Kai	Netflix	
2023	Alan Ritchson	Jack Reacher	Reacher	Amazon Prime Video	
2023	Sylvester Stallone	Dwight Manfredi	Tulsa King	Paramount+	
2023	William Zabka	Johnny Lawrence	Cobra Kai	Netflix	
2024	Idris Elba	Sam Nelson	Hijack	Apple TV+	
2024	Gabriel Basso	Peter Sutherland	The Night Agent	Netflix	
2024	Andrew Koji	Ah Sahm	Warrior	Max	
2024	John Krasinski	Jack Ryan	Tom Clancy's Jack Ryan	Amazon Prime Video	
2024	Rob Lowe	Owen Marshal Strand	9-1-1: Lone Star	Fox	
2024	Alan Ritchson	Jack Reacher	Reacher	Amazon Prime Video	
2025	Hiroyuki Sanada	Lord Yoshii Toranaga	Shōgun	FX	
2025	Sterling K. Brown	Xavier Collins	Paradise	Hulu	
2025	Theo James	Edward "Eddie" Horniman	The Gentlemen	Netflix	
2025	Eddie Redmayne	"The Jackal" / Alex Duggan	The Day of the Jackal	Peacock	
2025	Alan Ritchson	Jack Reacher	Reacher	Amazon Prime Video	
2025	Ben Whishaw	Sam Young	Black Doves	Netflix	
2026	Sterling K. Brown	Xavier Collins	Paradise	Hulu	
2026	Idris Elba	Sam Nelson	Hijack	Apple TV	
2026	Ethan Hawke	Lee Raybon	The Lowdown	FX	
2026	Zahn McClarnon	Joe Leaphorn	Dark Winds	AMC	
2026	Mark Ruffalo	Tom Brandis	Task	HBO	
2026	Scott Speedman	R.J. Decker	R.J. Decker	ABC	

== Series with multiple nominations ==
4 nominations

- Cobra Kai

3 nominations

- Reacher

2 nominations

- Hijack
- Hunters
- Tom Clancy's Jack Ryan
- Paradise
- Warrior

== Performers with multiple nominations ==
3 nominations

- Alan Ritchson

2 nominations

- Sterling K. Brown
- Idris Elba
- Andrew Koji
- John Krasinski
- Alexander Ludwig
- Ralph Macchio
- William Zabka

== See also ==
- Critics' Choice Super Award for Best Action Series
- Critics' Choice Super Award for Best Actress in an Action Series
