= Critics' Choice Super Award for Best Horror Movie =

Award for horror films

- Country: United States
- Presented by: Critics Choice Association
- First award: 2021
- Currently held by: Obsession (2026)
- Website: criticschoice.com

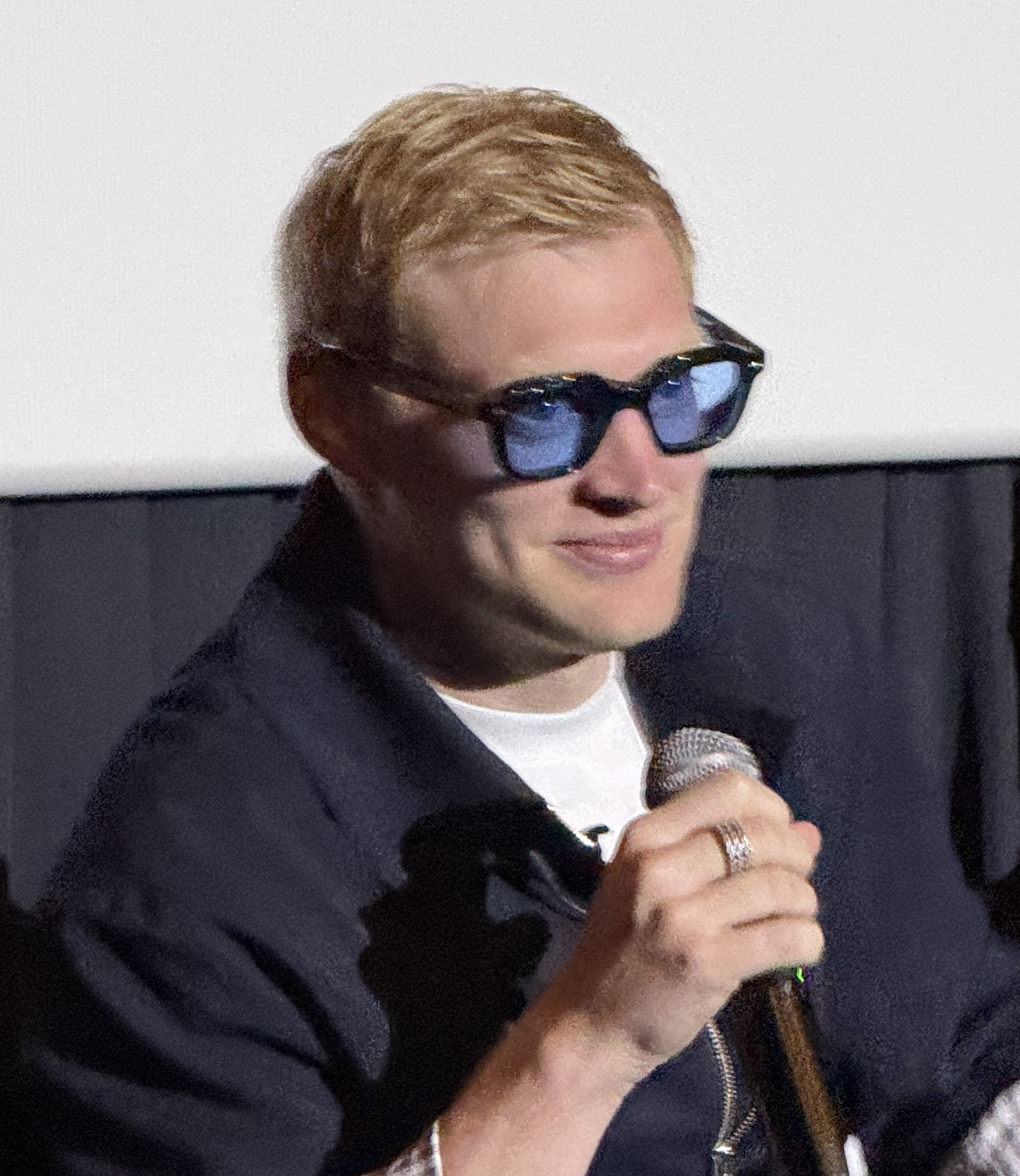
Curry Barker at a Q&A for his award winning film Obsession (2026) in Los Angeles, 2026

The Critics' Choice Super Award for Best Horror Movie is an award presented by the Critics Choice Association to the best film in the horror genre.

== Winners and nominees ==
Year	Film	Director	Ref.
2021	The Invisible Man	Leigh Whannell	
2021	Freaky	Christopher Landon	
2021	Relic	Natalie Erika James	
2021	The Rental	Dave Franco	
2021	Sputnik	Egor Abramenko	
2022	A Quiet Place Part II	John Krasinski	
2022	Candyman	Nia DaCosta	
2022	Last Night in Soho	Edgar Wright	
2022	Malignant	James Wan	
2022	The Night House	David Bruckner	
2022	Titane	Julia Ducournau	
2023	Barbarian	Zach Cregger	
2023	The Black Phone	Scott Derrickson	
2023	Pearl	Ti West	
2023	Smile	Parker Finn	
2023	Speak No Evil	Christian Tafdrup	
2023	X	Ti West	
2024	Talk to Me	Danny Philippou and Michael Philippou	
2024	Evil Dead Rise	Lee Cronin	
2024	M3GAN	Gerard Johnstone	
2024	Scream VI	Matt Bettinelli-Olpin and Tyler Gillett	
2024	When Evil Lurks	Demián Rugna	
2025	Sinners	Ryan Coogler	
2025	Bring Her Back	Danny Philippou and Michael Philippou	
2025	Heretic	Scott Beck and Bryan Woods	
2025	Longlegs	Osgood Perkins	
2025	Nosferatu	Robert Eggers	
2025	The Substance	Coralie Fargeat	
2026	Obsession	Curry Barker	
2026	28 Years Later: The Bone Temple	Nia DaCosta	
2026	Backrooms	Kane Parsons	
2026	The Long Walk	Francis Lawrence	
2026	Send Help	Sam Raimi	
2026	Weapons	Zach Cregger	

== Directors with multiple nominations ==
2 nominations

- Zach Cregger
- Nia DaCosta
- Danny Philippou and Michael Philippou
- Ti West
