= Critics' Choice Super Award for Best Action Movie =

- Country: United States
- Presented by: Critics Choice Association
- First award: 2021
- Currently held by: The Furious (2026)
- Website: criticschoice.com

The Critics' Choice Super Award for Best Action Movie is an award presented by the Critics Choice Association to the best film in the action genre.

== Winners and nominees ==
Year	Film	Director	Ref.
2021	Da 5 Bloods	Spike Lee	
2021	Bad Boys for Life	Adil El Arbi and Bilall Fallah	
2021	Extraction	Sam Hargrave	
2021	Greyhound	Aaron Schneider	
2021	The Hunt	Craig Zobel	
2021	Mulan	Niki Caro	
2021	The Outpost	Rod Lurie	
2021	Tenet	Christopher Nolan	
2022	No Time to Die	Cary Joji Fukunaga	
2022	Gunpowder Milkshake	Navot Papushado	
2022	The Harder They Fall	Jeymes Samuel	
2022	The Last Duel	Ridley Scott	
2022	Nobody	Ilya Naishuller	
2022	Wrath of Man	Guy Ritchie	
2023	Top Gun: Maverick	Joseph Kosinski	
2023	Bullet Train	David Leitch	
2023	RRR	S. S. Rajamouli	
2023	The Unbearable Weight of Massive Talent	Tom Gormican	
2023	The Woman King	Gina Prince-Bythewood	
2024	John Wick: Chapter 4	Chad Stahelski	
2024	Extraction 2	Sam Hargrave	
2024	Indiana Jones and the Dial of Destiny	James Mangold	
2024	Mission: Impossible – Dead Reckoning Part One	Christopher McQuarrie	
2024	Sisu	Jalmari Helander	
2025	Mission: Impossible – The Final Reckoning	Christopher McQuarrie	
2025	Civil War	Alex Garland	
2025	The Fall Guy	David Leitch	
2025	Monkey Man	Dev Patel	
2025	Rebel Ridge	Jeremy Saulnier	
2025	Warfare	Ray Mendoza and Alex Garland	
2026	The Furious	Kenji Tanigaki	
2026	Mike & Nick & Nick & Alice	BenDavid Grabinski	
2026	Motor City	Potsy Ponciroli	
2026	The Naked Gun	Akiva Schaffer	
2026	Normal	Ben Wheatley	
2026	The Rip	Joe Carnahan	
2026	Sisu: Road to Revenge	Jalmari Helander	

== Directors with multiple nominations ==
2 nominations

- Alex Garland
- Sam Hargrave
- Jalmari Helander
- David Leitch
- Christopher McQuarrie
