= The Legend of Kublai Khan =

- Also known as: Legend of Yuan Empire Founder
- Traditional Chinese: 忽必烈傳奇 / 建元風雲
- Simplified Chinese: 忽必烈传奇 / 建元风云
- Hanyu Pinyin: Hūbìliè Chuánqí / Jiàn Yuán Fēngyún
- Genre: Historical drama
- Written by: Hasi Bagen
- Directed by: Tsui Siu-ming
- Presented by: Li Hua; Zhou Shidu; Yu Dong; Sheng Luosong; Kong Deming; Cao Fang; Wu Huai'en; Wang Guangzhong; Liu Hong; Xi Hongyi; Du Daning; He Ling; Guo Li; Liu Zhanhui; Cheng Lidong; Jin Tingting; Wu Weimin; Wang Jingyi; Tian Jun; Zheng Yuxia; Li Ying; Xiaoning; Zhang Huayong; Hou Li; Wu Zhiling; Wang Liqiao; Luo Yi
- Starring: Hu Jun; Charmaine Sheh; Cai Wenyan; Wu Yue; Tang Guoqiang; Gao Fa; Steven Ma; Ray Lui; Ba Sen; Hasi Gaowa; Xie Miao; Xu Xiangdong; Du Yiheng; He Yanni; Wang Huilai; Xu Dongmei; Huang Jianqun; Zhang Yan; Debbie Goh; Liu Xiaoxiao; Zhang Jingda; Jin Tingting
- Opening theme: "Take Control of the World" (乾坤无地不包容) performed by Tsui Siu-ming
- Ending theme: "Tears Falling on Flower Buds" (泪水打落了花蕾) performed by Jin Tingting
- Composer: Luo Jian
- Country of origin: China
- Original language: Mandarin
- No. of episodes: 50; 46 (Hong Kong release)

Production
- Executive producers: Wang Xiangwen; Zhang Ping; Fan Xiaojun; Feng Wei; Liu Yipeng; Su Jianrong; Liu Haiming; Wang Guang; Chang Sheng; Zhang Zili; Wang Haitao; Guo Zhijian; Zhao Wei; Tu Tu; Zhao-Yan Guozhang; Xu-Li Fengming
- Producers: Zhou Shidu; Sheng Luosong; Feng Jing; Xi Hongyi; Tang Xuan; Zhu Xianqing; Zhang Linshu; Bu Xiaofeng; Di Nannan; Wang Liqiao; He Qing
- Production location: China
- Cinematography: Guan Jianxiong
- Editor: Li Jian
- Running time: 45 minutes per episode
- Production companies: Hainan Province Film and Television Production Centre; Tianjin Beifang Film Group; Bona Film Group; China International Culture and Art Centre; Beijing Yangguang Shengtong Culture Art; Jiuzhou Audio-Visual Publishing; Beijing Dongfang Investment Managing; Inner Mongolia Shiqi Group; Beijing Ruyi Jixiang Television Planning; Beijing Zhongshi Meixing International Culture Media; Alpas Grasslands Culture Tourism Development; The Travel Channel; Qilin Net (Beijing) Film Culture Media; Guofu Film (Beijing) Culture Media; LeTV.com

Original release
- Network: HBS
- Release: 21 July – 30 July 2013

The Legend of Kublai Khan, also known as Legend of Yuan Empire Founder, is a Chinese television series based on the life of Kublai Khan and the events leading to the establishment of the Mongol-led Yuan dynasty in China. The series started shooting in 2011. It premiered at the 2013 Shanghai Television Festival from 11 to 13 June 2013, and was first aired on HBS from 21 to 30 July 2013. The series was directed by Tsui Siu-ming and starred Hu Jun and Charmaine Sheh as Kublai Khan and Chabi, along with Cai Wenyan, Wu Yue, Tang Guoqiang, Gao Fa, Steven Ma and Ray Lui in supporting roles.

== Plot ==
The series, spanning over 70 years, romanticises the life of Kublai Khan and the events leading to the establishment of the Mongol-led Yuan dynasty in China.

Kublai was born in 1215 as a son of Tolui, the fourth son of Genghis Khan. At the time, Töregene, the wife of Ögedei (Genghis Khan's third son), sees Tolui as a potential threat to her husband. As Tolui gains more glory from his victories in battle, Töregene frets that Genghis Khan will choose Tolui instead of Ögedei to be his successor. She also feels uneasy because the young Kublai is highly favoured by his grandfather.

Ögedei eventually succeeds his father as the Great Khan of the Mongol Empire. After Töregene secretly poisons Tolui to death, Tolui's eldest son Möngke gathers his brothers to discuss avenging their father. Töregene plans to use this opportunity to accuse Möngke and his brothers of plotting treason against Ögedei, and thereby get rid of Tolui's descendants. At this critical juncture, Kublai and his mother, Sorghaghtani, manage to convince Möngke and the others not to do anything rash. Instead, they would secretly build up their forces, lie low, and wait until the time is ripe to take revenge.

Following Ögedei's death, Töregene becomes the Regent of the Mongol Empire for some years until her son Güyük is elected as the new Great Khan. When Güyük dies in a conflict against his cousin Batu, his wife Qaimish takes over as the Regent for a brief period of time until Möngke becomes the new Great Khan.

A few years later, after Möngke dies in a battle against the Song Empire, Kublai and his younger brother Ariq Böke get into a power struggle over the succession. Kublai eventually overcomes his brother, and secures his position as the Great Khan after defeating all his rivals. He conquers the rest of China and establishes the Yuan dynasty, becoming its founding emperor.

== Cast ==
- Hu Jun as Kublai
  - Su Jiahang as Kublai (young)
- Charmaine Sheh as Chabi
- Cai Wenyan as Töregene
- Wu Yue as Ariq Böke
  - Lao Huanjie as Ariq Böke (young)
- Tang Guoqiang as Genghis Khan
- Gao Fa as Möngke
  - Lei Haotian as Möngke (young)
- Steven Ma as Liu Bingzhong
- Ray Lui as Tolui
- Ba Sen as Ögedei
- Hasi Gaowa as Sorghaghtani
- Xie Miao as Širemün
- Xu Xiangdong as Huochi
- Du Yiheng as Hao Jing
- He Yanni as Yunlin
- Wang Huilai as Dong Wenyong
- Xu Dongmei as Kusa'er
- Huang Chien-chun as Güyük
  - Jin Bo as Güyük (young)
- Debbie Goh as Qaimish
- Zhang Yan as Yelü Chucai / Yelü Zhu
- Liu Xiaoxiao as Hao Qin
- Zhang Jingda as Hulagu
  - Zhang Bolun as Hulagu (young)
- Jin Tingting as Yina
  - Zhang Jiaojiao as Yina (young)
- Sengge Renqin as Chilaun
- Dao'erji as Subutai
- Lu Ying as Anchen
- Liu Sibo as Fifth Princess
- Luo Huimiao as Alandar
- Ji Shuai as Liu Taiping
- He Ya'nan as Tana
- Wang Lu as Kaidu
- Li Hua as Yesutai
- Menghe Wuliji as Chagatai
- Hongtong Batu as Jochi
- Sude Siqin as Bo'orchu
- Siqin Bilige as Batu
- Gangte Mu'er as Shiban
- Dao'erji as Godan
  - Liu Shijia as Godan (young)
- Baoyin Gexige as Mukha
- Dong Ming as Baodi
- Wang Zhengping as Reverend Haiyun
- Jiang Yongbo as Ahmad Fanakati
- Anna as Fatima
- Dalielihan Hade'er as Suhe
- Bate'er as Buhe
- Sulide as Batu
- Fan Yu as Qašin
- Suyou Lesiren as Yesu
- Hong Chang as Li Tan
- Yan Linfei as Wang Jian
- Yong Qing as Narisong
- Tao Ri as Taozi
- Tang Zhaokang as Jinhua
- Wudamu as Bateng
- Wang Xueqian as Zhenjin
- Yijile as Khochu
- Lan Tian as Hutu
- Jiang Haotong as Naohu

== International broadcasts ==
Region	Network(s)/Station(s)	Series premiere	Title (if different from original)
China	HBS	July 21, 2013 - July 30, 2013	
Malaysia	8TV	September 11, 2013 - November 19, 2014 (Asian Select Monday to Friday 20:30-21:30)	
Taiwan	GTV1HD	December 19, 2013 - January 17, 2014 (Monday to Friday 20:00-22:00)	大漠風雲
Hong Kong	TVB Jade	December 23, 2013 - February 28, 2014 (Monday to Friday HD Theater 23:45-00:45 (for other replay times, please see here), Broadcasting will be suspended on December 31, January 30, 31 and February 7)	建元風雲
United States	KTSF 26	March 21, 2014 - May 29, 2014 (Monday to Friday 20:00-21:00)	
Hong Kong	Jade	April 23, 2015 – June 30, 2015 (至五 10:30 - 11:30, 5月1日及25日暫停播映, 5月28日 11:00 - 11:55)	
South Korea	CHING	June 11, 2015 - 2015 ()	
United States	KSCI 18	September 24, 2015 - 2015 (Monday to Friday from 12.00 to 13.00)	
Japan	ASIA DRAMATIC	April 24, 2016 - 2016 ("Fabylai Han")	
Thailand	True4U	November 5, 2015 – April 8, 2016 (Every Thursday to Friday from 14.00 - 15.00.)	ตำนานกุบไลข่าน จักรพรรดิแห่งมอลโกล
Thailand	5HD1	March 27, 2019 to 20 June 2019 (Every Monday to Thursday from 22.30 - 23.30.)	ตำนานกุบไลข่าน
Thailand	NEW18	April 6, 2020 – June 30, 2020 (Every Monday to Thursday from 21.15 - 22.15.)	ตำนานกุบไลข่าน

== Production ==
The Legend of Kublai Khan was produced at a cost of about 150 million yuan.

== Awards ==
The Legend of Kublai Khan won the Golden Angel Award for Outstanding Television Series and Best Director of Chinese TV Series at the 2013 Chinese American Film Festival.

== Controversy over title renaming ==
The Legend of Kublai Khan was released under the title The Genius of War – Kublai (打仗天才忽必烈) when it was aired on Hunan Broadcasting System (HBS) in July 2013. Apparently, this was done without the approval of the producers, and the reason behind the renaming is believed to be that HBS wanted to attract higher viewership. Director Tsui Siu-ming and lead actor Hu Jun expressed unhappiness over the renaming; Hu even wrote on his weibo, "Who changed the title? What genius of war?", and added an angry emoticon.
