= My Father Is a Hero =

1995 Hong Kong film by Corey Yuen

- My Father Is a Hero film poster
- Directed by: Corey Yuen
- Written by: Wong Jing; Sandy Shaw
- Story by: Wong Jing
- Produced by: Wong Jing; Tiffany Chen
- Starring: Jet Li; Anita Mui; Xie Miao; Yu Rongguang
- Cinematography: Tom Lau
- Edited by: Angie Lam
- Music by: Mark Lau; Wong Jim
- Distributed by: Win's Entertainment, Ltd.
- Release date: 2 March 1995
- Running time: 104 minutes
- Country: Hong Kong
- Languages: Cantonese; Mandarin
- Box office: HK$15.5 million

My Father Is a Hero (simplified Chinese: 给爸爸的信; traditional Chinese: 給爸爸的信, released in the United States and United Kingdom as The Enforcer and Jet Li's The Enforcer) is a 1995 Hong Kong action film starring Jet Li and Anita Mui, directed by Corey Yuen, who also co-stars in the film. The film was released in Hong Kong on 2 March 1995.

== Plot ==
Kung Wei, a police officer of the People's Republic of China, is sent undercover to spy on a group of Hong Kong criminals. Despite his worries about his sick wife, who has severe asthma, and his eight-year-old son Ku Kung, a martial arts student, Wei's duty interferes with his familial relationship. Before he leaves, Wei gives Ku a beeper number to keep in touch.

Wei enters a prison and meets Darkie, a gang member who formerly worked for gang leader Po. Wei and Darkie escape from the prison and travel to Hong Kong to meet with Po. Wei is inducted into the gang and participates in an arms deal with foreign criminals. The deal goes awry and attracts the attention of off-duty Hong Kong detective Anne Fong, whose boyfriend, Inspector Cheng, is taken hostage by Wei. Fong volunteers herself as a hostage in exchange for Cheng; in Wei's custody she attempts to crash their getaway car but he manages to escape. Utilizing a photo of Wei that was taken before the arms deal, Fong heads to Beijing to uncover his true identity. Back in Beijing, school bullies tease Ku, who believe his father to be a real criminal. Fong befriends the Wei family, and deduces Wei's role as a police officer. During her time with the family, Wei's wife has a fatal asthma attack; before dying she requests Fong deliver a letter to Wei, and charges her with taking care of Ku. Wei receives a message from Ku that his wife has died, and in grief he almost blows his cover.

Anne and Ku travel to Hong Kong, informing Inspector Cheng of her recent findings. However, against Fong's wishes, Cheng reports Ku as missing in order to lure out Wei, which attracts publicity from local media and both Wei's and Po's attention. Believing Fong to have betrayed him, Ku escapes from her apartment and is picked up by Po. Meanwhile, Wei attempts to sneak into Fong's apartment to recover Ku, but is confronted by Fong before receiving his wife's final letter from her, which tells him to trust Fong. Wei returns to Po's penthouse where is unexpectedly reunited with his son; however in order to maintain his cover he pretends to kill Ku using a special chokehold and his son's unconscious body is dumped in the trash outside. Before Wei can retrieve Ku, Po confronts him having deduced Wei's identity as a cop. Wei gets into a losing fight with Po until Fong intervenes and they escape. While Fong gives Wei medical care, Ku is rescued by Darkie.

The next day, Po instructs his gang to plant six bombs at an antiques auction attended by rich people on a boat. As a means of tying up loose ends, Po and his gang raid Darkie's houseboat, having suspected his role in helping Wei and rescuing Ku. Darkie hides Ku from Po before being mortally wounded; before dying Darkie tells Ku about Po's scheme and gives him a mobile phone to contact Wei. Wei and Ku reunite and board the boat; Ku helps Wei locate the bombs and he manages to defuse all but one of them. During the auction, Po attempts to rob the crowd, but discovers the bombs have become inoperable before Wei confronts him.

Wei faces off against Po and his men alone before Ku arrives to help his father and the pair defeat Po's men. Fong arrives by helicopter and shoots at Po but he takes Ku hostage by choking him. Ku uses a breathing technique to hold his breath until Wei shoots Po and lets the now unconscious Ku go. Fong and Wei try to evacuate Ku off the boat via the helicopter, but Po arms the timer of the last bomb and pins Wei down while Fong and Ku escape. Wei eventually gets out of the pin and knocks Po out, narrowly escaping the boat's explosion. Wei is reunited with Fong and Ku in hospital, who has recovered from his ordeal.

== Cast ==
- Jet Li as Kung Wei
- Anita Mui as Inspector Anne Fong Yat-wa
- Xie Miao as Johnny Kung Ku
- Yu Rongguang as Po Kwong
- Sing Ngai as Thug
- Low Houi-kang as Thug
- Damian Lau as Inspector Cheng
- Corey Yuen as Bartender
- Blackie Ko as Darkie

== Release ==
My Father Is a Hero was released in Hong Kong on 2 March 1995. In the Philippines, the film was released with the same name by Asia Films on 22 November 1995.

=== Home media ===
- The Mei Ah Laserdisc contains a scene where Po Kwang and his thug (Collin Chou) speculate Kung Wei being an undercover cop. It occurs before the scene where Little Ku appears on the news. Versions maintaining the original score that exclude this scene contain a jump in the audio.
- Indian distributor Diskovery released the export English version on VCD. It is cut, however.
- Mei Ah released a non-remastered DVD with Cantonese and Mandarin soundtracks with English and Chinese subtitles.
- In the US, My Father Is A Hero was re-edited/scored/dubbed and released as The Enforcer by Dimension Films in 2000. No option for the original Cantonese audio was included. The same version of the film was released in the UK on DVD in 2004 by Hollywood Pictures (the VHS in 2002).
- A remastered anamorphic DVD was released by Mei Ah in 2005. Like a number of Mei Ah's "mono" soundtracks, it's a downmix of the 5.1 audio.
- In 2009, Dragon Dynasty released a Special Edition of the film with new additional features. However, the Dimension cut and soundtrack had been preserved, making this the first Dragon Dynasty release that does not feature the original language soundtrack (with exception to 'My Young Auntie').
- Also in 2009, an Austrian DVD by MIB was released featuring the uncut Hong Kong version with its original mono Cantonese soundtrack and newly remastered English subtitles - among the extras are trailers and a deleted scene (the aforementioned Laserdisc).

== Reception ==
At the Hong Kong box office, the film grossed HK$15,530,642.

In the United Kingdom, the film (released as Jet Li's The Enforcer) was watched by 1 million viewers on television in 2004, making it the year's eighth most-watched foreign-language film on television (below seven other Hong Kong action films).

=== Critical reception ===
Rotten Tomatoes, a review aggregator, reports that 54% of 13 surveyed critics gave the film a positive review; the average rating is 5.3/10. Joey O'Bryan of The Austin Chronicle rated it 2.5/5 stars and wrote of Li and Tse that "there is an unevenness at work here that keeps the film from reaching the delirious heights of this dynamic duo's previous collaborations". Bill Gibron of PopMatters rated it 8/10 stars and wrote, "In fact, it’s the thrills and character interaction that makes The Enforcer much more than a stereotypical trip through the Asian underworld." Earl Cressey of DVD Talk rated it 4/5 stars and wrote that it "combines some fantastic martial arts action and a decent story with great results". David Johnson of DVD Verdict called it a "disappointing action movie" and wrote that he could not accept a child who fights against adult henchmen.
