= The Furious =

2025 Hong Kong film by Kenji Tanigaki

- Theatrical release poster
- Traditional Chinese: 火遮眼
- Jyutping: Fo^{2} Ze^{1} Ngaan^{5}
- Directed by: Kenji Tanigaki
- Screenplay by: Mak Tin-shu; Lei Zhilong; Shum Kwan-sin; Frank Hui
- Produced by: Bill Kong; Frank Hui; Shan Tam
- Starring: Xie Miao; Joe Taslim; Yang Enyou; Jeeja Yanin; Brian Le; Joey Iwanaga; Yayan Ruhian
- Cinematography: Meteor Cheung
- Edited by: Chris Tonick
- Music by: Elliot Leung; Olivia Xiaolin; Flying Lotus
- Production companies: Edko Films; Zhejiang Hengdian Film; XYZ Films
- Distributed by: Edko Films (Hong Kong); Lionsgate Films (International)
- Release dates: 6 September 2025 (TIFF); 12 June 2026 (Hong Kong)
- Running time: 113 minutes
- Country: Hong Kong (Note: Currently, there are consistent and overwhelming sources showing that the film is solely a Hong Kong production, including Variety's listing of the production country as "Hong Kong" only, as well as numerous film reviews, news articles, and film festival websites.)
- Language: English
- Budget: US$20 million
- Box office: US$41.8 million

The Furious (Chinese: 火遮眼) is a 2025 English-language Hong Kong action film, directed by Kenji Tanigaki. It stars Xie Miao as an ordinary man who, with journalist Navin's (Joe Taslim) help, fights a criminal empire to rescue his kidnapped daughter (Yang Enyou). The cast also features Brian Le, Joey Iwanaga, Yayan Ruhian, and Jeeja Yanin.

The film had its world premiere at the 50th Toronto International Film Festival on 6 September 2025. It was theatrically released in Hong Kong on 12 June 2026. The film enjoyed international box office success and received critical acclaim.

== Plot ==
In a city in Southeast Asia, journalist Matia investigates an unchecked local child trafficking ring despite her husband Navin requesting her to return home. She finds trafficked children and fights traffickers to help a child escape. The traffickers' leader, Paklung, and his kukri and bow-wielding lieutenant, Tak, arrive. Tak kills the child and captures Matia.

Months later, widowed mute handyman Wang Wei is being visited by his daughter Rainy, who wishes him to return with her to China but when Wei refuses Rainy runs off in anger. She meets a limping Chinese boy who lures her to be kidnapped by human traffickers, led by Ho. Wei finds and fights the traffickers, but they ultimately escape with Rainy. Wei informs the local police, but the police captain, secretly working with Paklung, shuts down the investigation. The police then discover that Wei has an unknown past.

Meanwhile, Navin investigates Matia's disappearance by pretending to purchase children from trafficker Song, Ho's "father", at his fight club. Wei, recalling evidence tying the traffickers to Song's fight club, arrives there as well. A trafficker recognises Wei and alerts others to attack him. Spooked by the conflict, Song orders Navin killed. Navin and a hammer-wielding Wei fend off their attackers, then battle each other, before realising their common enemy and allying together. Analyzing Navin and Matia's collected evidence, Wei discovers a lead and goes with Navin to Song's ice factory, where the children were supposedly held. Wei and Navin violently defeat Song, his henchmen, and a sledgehammer-wielding Ho, but the children are nowhere to be found. Wei and Navin torture Song, who discloses that the children were moved to a location called the "Snake Pit" and that Matia is dead. After the two leave, Song tries to escape, but Paklung and Tak arrive to execute him. Ho later recovers and finds Song's corpse.

At the Snake Pit, Rainy attacks a trafficker, starting an escape attempt by the children, though most are recaptured. Wei and Navin arrive, fighting the traffickers and reuniting with Rainy. With Navin live-streaming through Matia's account and publicizing the rescue attempt, the public and police are alerted and arrive at the Snake Pit. The police captain has the police stop the public from interfering while more traffickers arrive to stop Wei and Navin. Navin instructs Wei and Rainy to leave safely while he fights on, but Rainy persuades Wei to help all of the other trafficked children escape. The police captain is overruled by his sergeant, Yadong, and the remaining police and public scramble to help. With Navin and Wei brutally stopping the traffickers, the public manages to save Rainy and the children, while Yadong manages to shoot a trafficker to save the limping boy. The surviving traffickers are arrested, while the kidnapped children are reunited with their families. Navin and Wei are held overnight at the police station's jail, with Rainy and the limping boy also present at the station.

When Paklung's father-in-law, a criminal kingpin, attempts to turn Paklung in as a fall guy to the police captain, Paklung instead slaughters his father-in-law and his aides, as well as the police captain, but accidentally kills his pregnant wife during his rampage. Paklung and Tak arrive at the police station for revenge, slaughtering most of the policemen and incapacitating Yadong. Wei and Navin escape from the jail cell to protect Rainy and the limping boy. As Wei and Navin duel Paklung and Tak, Ho arrives and attacks all the fighters. Tak admits his role in Matia's killing; Navin suffers fatal stab wounds from Tak but fatally bites Tak's neck. Paklung kills Ho and knocks Wei out, but not before Wei delivers fatal heavy blows to Paklung's head. Rainy and the limping boy prepare to defend Wei, but Paklung succumbs to his concussions before collapsing dead.

One month later, Wei, Rainy, the limping boy, and Yadong scatter Navin's ashes into the sea, while also honoring Matia. In a flashback, Wei's name is revealed for the first time by Wei to Navin while in the police jail. After scattering the ashes, Wei begins to tell Rainy his life story.

== Cast ==
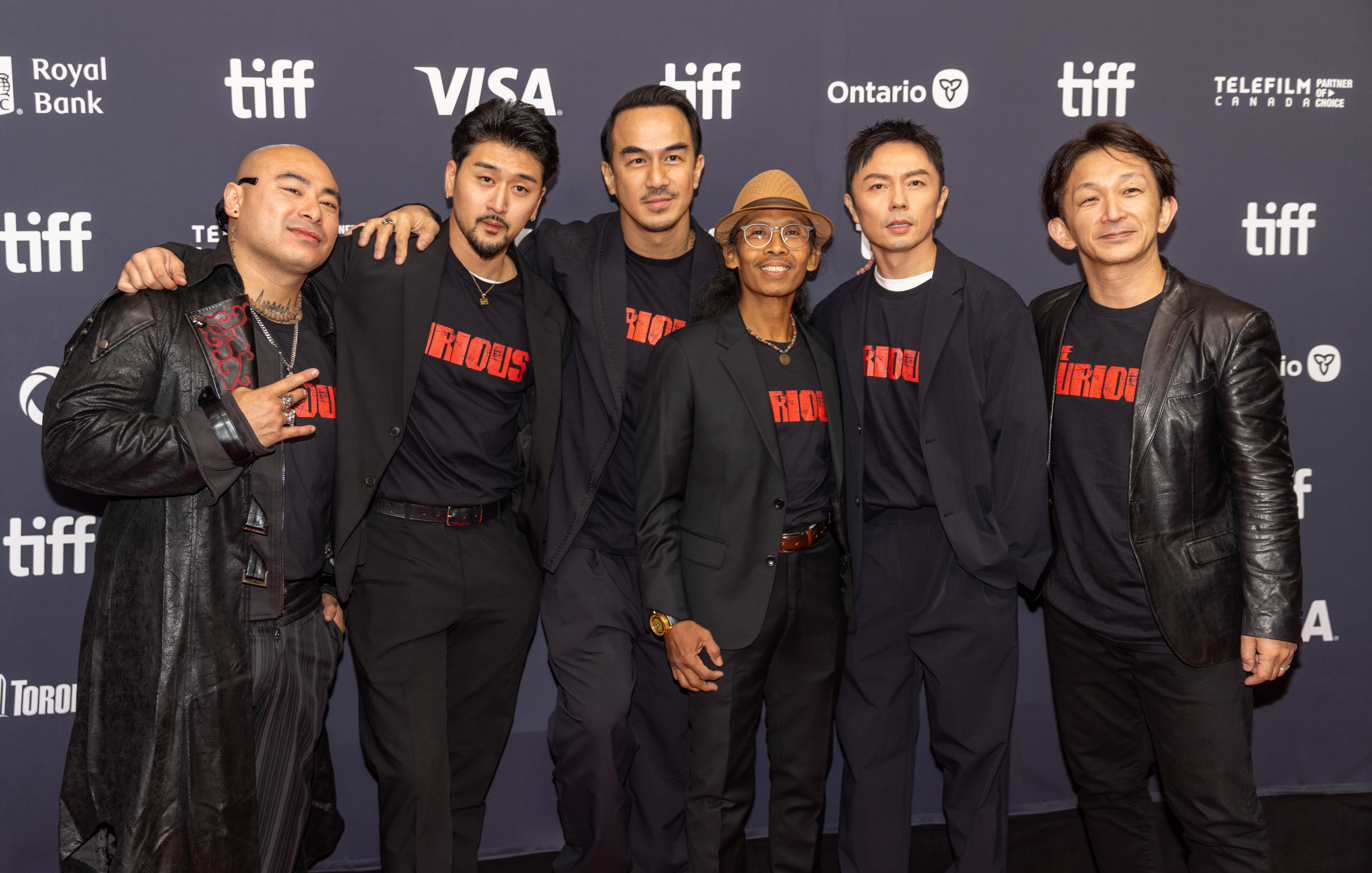
From left to right: Brian Le, Joey Iwanaga, Joe Taslim, Yayan Ruhian, Xie Miao, and director Kenji Tanigaki at the 2025 Toronto International Film Festival

- Xie Miao as Wang Wei, a mute tradesman with a mysterious past whose daughter is kidnapped.
- Joe Taslim as Navin, a journalist and Wang Wei's ally who is looking for his wife, Matia, who also went missing.
- Yang Enyou as Rainy, Wang Wei's daughter
- Brian Le as Ho, a henchman of the child trafficking syndicate, and Song's "son".
- Joey Iwanaga as Paklung, a sociopathic son-in-law of a powerful gangster and the leader of the child trafficking syndicate.
- Yayan Ruhian as Tak, Paklung's second-in-command, and a bow-wielding henchman of the child trafficking syndicate.
- Jeeja Yanin as Matia Pham, an investigative journalist attempting to uncover the child trafficking syndicate.
- Sahajak Boonthanakit as Mr. Song, one of the managers of the child trafficking syndicate.
- Mimi Chu as a hair salon owner.
- Manatsanun Phanlerdwongsakul as Yadong, a police sergeant.

== Production ==
The Furious was announced to be in development in April 2024, which is set to be primarily financed and produced by Hong Kong's Edko Films, while the project would be in English language and filmed in Thailand, with the American XYZ Films co-producing and handling world sales. The production budget was reported to be roughly $20 million. Kenji Tanigaki was announced to helm the project as director, and Mak Tin Shu attached as the writer, while the ensemble cast features a pan-Asian lineup, including China's Xie Miao and Yang Enyou, Indonesia's Joe Taslim and Yayan Ruhian, and Thailand's Jeeja Yanin. The filming crew consists mostly of Thai locals, while the stunt team is Japanese. The actors began rehearsing the fight scenes a month-and-a-half before filming commenced, with cinematographer Meteor Cheung joining them a couple of weeks later to incorporate the camera work into the choreography. First images were released on 23 August, with Vietnamese-American martial artist Brian Le and Japanese-American dancer Joey Iwanaga revealed as part of the cast. In September, the film was presented at the project market of the Toronto International Film Festival.

Principal photography began in April 2024 in Bangkok, Thailand, and spanned across three months. A recurring police station set in the film was constructed and renovated from an old retail unit on Surawong Road, and was used for 18 days of shooting. Originally, the ending fight scene was meant to feature Xie and Taslim fighting against Ruhian and Iwanaga, but Tanigaki liked Le's character and wanted the actor to join as a fifth participant. Filming wrapped in late July. In May 2025, American musician Flying Lotus was reported to be involved in producing the film's soundtrack, while XYZ Films represented the film at the Cannes Film Market.

== Release ==
The Furious had its world premiere at the Midnight Madness section of the 50th Toronto International Film Festival on 6 September 2025, and screened in competition at the 58th Sitges Film Festival and at the Midnight Passion section of the 30th Busan International Film Festival. HK01 initially reported that the film would be released theatrically in Hong Kong within the same year. In October 2025, Lionsgate Films acquired international distribution rights for the film outside Hong Kong, Macau, and mainland China, planning a day-and-date worldwide release with the aforementioned territories in 2026. The film was also screened at the 2025 Beyond Fest in the United States, the 45th Hawai'i International Film Festival, the 5th Red Sea International Film Festival, and as the closing film of the 26th Boston Underground Film Festival. It was theatrically released in Hong Kong on 12 June 2026.

The film was originally scheduled to have a nationwide theatrical release in the United States on 29 May 2026, but was later pushed back to 12 June as well. Lionsgate Films assigned the team of Lionsgate Premiere to handle the film's United States theatrical release, even though the film itself still carries the main Lionsgate Films logo.

The film has a Chinese version and an international version, which slightly differ in terms of storyline, scenes, and action sequences.

The Furious will be released in Japan on 29 January 2027.

== Reception ==
=== Box office ===
The Furious grossed $6.5 million in the United States and Canada. It also enjoyed solid success on the United States VOD market. Lionsgate Films stated that the film would be profitable for them. (Lionsgate subsequently hired Kenji Tanigaki to develop another film The Reckoner.)

=== Critical response ===
On the review aggregator website Rotten Tomatoes, 98% of 153 critics' reviews are positive, with an average rating of 8.4/10. The website's consensus reads: "The Furious detonates into a relentless, blood-soaked spectacle of breathtakingly inventive martial arts choreography, with director Kenji Tanigaki delivering a brutal, balletic action extravaganza." Metacritic, which uses a weighted average, assigned the film a score of 85 out of 100, based on 21 critics, indicating "universal acclaim". Audiences surveyed by CinemaScore gave the film an average grade of "A" on an A+ to F scale.

Chris Bumbray of JoBlo.com gave The Furious a 7/10 and compared it to The Raid (2011), describing it as a "kick-ass, crowd-pleasing ride" despite not reaching the latter's hype due to "clunky" dialogue, overdubbing, and technical inadequacies, but overall delivering a "sheer adrenaline and crowd-pleasing ferocity" with "dynamic and unrelentingly brutal" action choreography. Brian Tallerico of RogerEbert.com wrote that while the film suffers from "atrocious" dialogue and "goofy" plotting, it features "well-directed and choreographed" stunt work by Kenji Tanigaki that delivers "the most impressive fight scenes in years". Andrew Webster of The Verge also praised the film as an "absolutely unrelenting and bone-crunching action movie", particularly its "brutal yet balletic" fight scenes and the "inventiveness and playfulness" where "everything can be part of the choreography".

=== Awards and nominations ===
Year	Award	Category	Recipient	Result	Ref.
2025	50th Toronto International Film Festival	People's Choice Award: Midnight Madness	The Furious	Runner-up	
2025	58th Sitges Film Festival	Special Jury Award	The Furious	Won (Note: Tied with Obsession)	
2025	58th Sitges Film Festival	Best Feature Film	The Furious	Nominated	
2026	6th Critics' Choice Super Awards	Best Action Movie	The Furious	Won	
2026	6th Critics' Choice Super Awards	Best Actor in an Action Movie	Xie Miao	Won	
2026	6th Critics' Choice Super Awards	Best Actor in an Action Movie	Joe Taslim	Nominated	
2026	9th Astra Midseason Movie Awards	Best Stunts	The Furious	Won	
