= Xie Miao =

Chinese actor

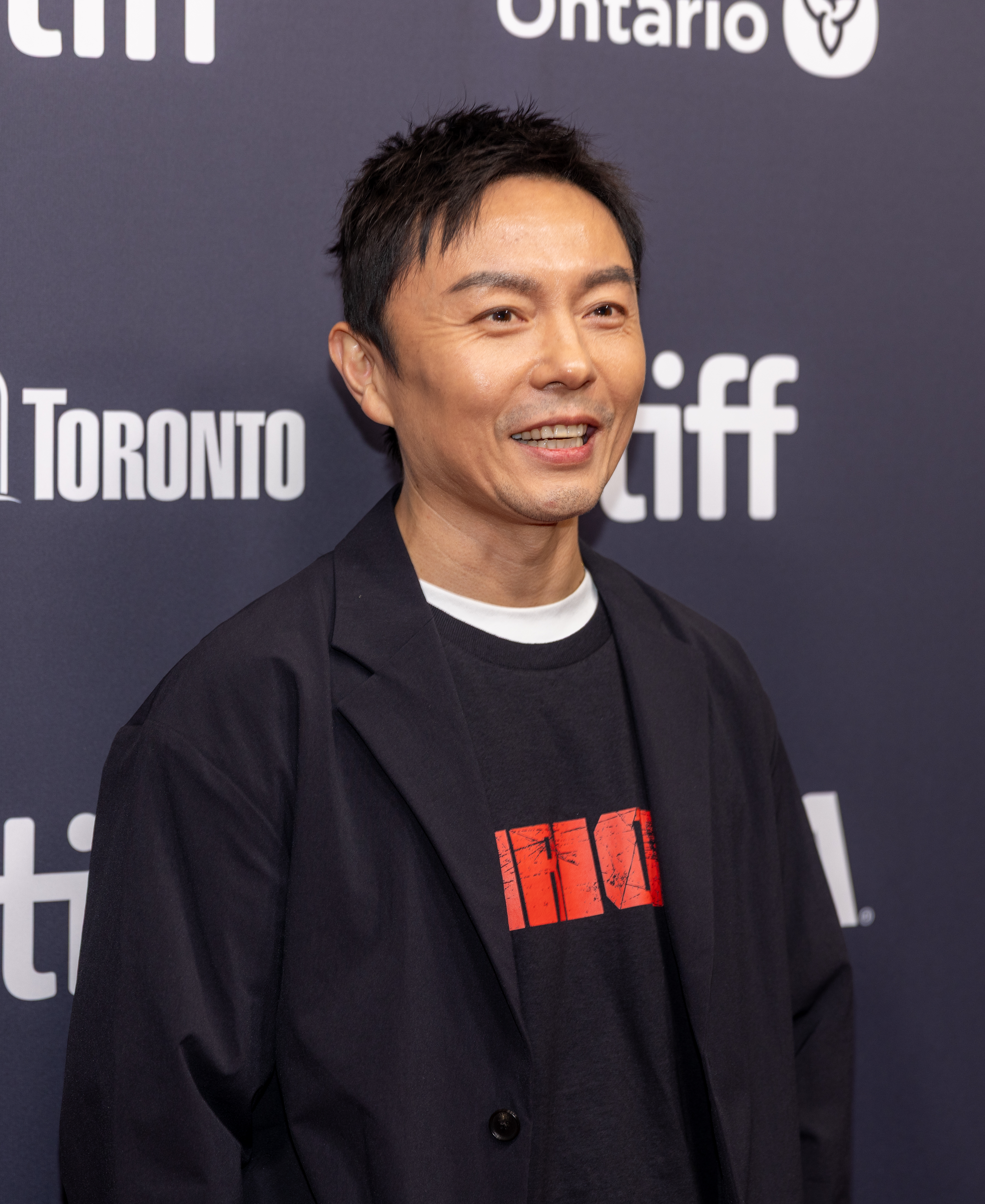
- Born: May 2, 1984 (age 42); Beijing
- Other names: Mo Tse, Miu Tse, Tsue Miu, Miao Xe
- Education: Capital University of Physical Education and Sports
- Occupations: Actor, martial artist
- Years active: 1993–present
- Known for: Action cinema
- Notable work: The New Legend of Shaolin, My Father Is a Hero, The Furious

Xie Miao (Chinese: 謝苗, also credited as Mo Tse, Miu Tse, Tse Miu, Tze Miu, Miao Xie) is a Chinese actor and martial artist who began his career as a child actor. Born in Beijing, Xie won championship titles in several wushu tournaments. He rose to fame when he starred as a father-son duo with Jet Li in the films The New Legend of Shaolin (1994) and My Father Is a Hero (1995).

Xie also appeared in God of Gamblers Returns (1994). He resumed his acting career after graduation from the Capital University of Physical Education and Sports (previously known as the Capital Institute of Physical Education) in Beijing, joining the cast of the Chinese television series Legend of Shaolin Temple in 2006 and appearing in the film The Kung Fu Master in 2010. He had prominent roles in productions such as Yuen Woo Ping's wuxia fantasy The Thousand Faces of Dunjia (2017) and also Ip Man: The Awakening (2021). He was also in The Champions, which was the opening film at the 2008 Chinese American Film Festival.

== Filmography ==
| Year | Title | Chinese Title | Role | Credited as | Notes |
|---|---|---|---|---|---|
| 1993 | | pinyin: Biānchéng làngzǐ | | Miao Xe | a.k.a. A Warrior's Tragedy |
| 1994 | The New Legend of Shaolin | pinyin: Hung Hei Kwun: Siu Lam ng zou | Hung Man Ting | Mo Tse | a.k.a. Legend of the Red Dragon |
| 1994 | God of Gamblers Returns | Chinese: 賭神2; Cantonese Yale: Du shen xu ji; lit. 'God of Gamblers 2' | | | a.k.a. God of Gamblers' Return and The Return of the God of Gamblers |
| 1995 | My Father Is a Hero | simplified Chinese: 给爸爸的信; traditional Chinese: 給爸爸的信; pinyin: Gěi bàba de xìn | Ku Kung / Johnny Kung | Miu Tse / Xia Miao | a.k.a. The Enforcer aka Letter To Daddy; Jet Li's The Enforcer |
| 1995 | Peter Pan | Chinese: 小飛俠; pinyin: Xiǎo fēi xiá | | | |
| 2003 | Iron Lion | pinyin: Tie shi | | Mo Tse | |
| 2008 | Champions | pinyin: Duo biao | Kwan Shu-bo | Mo Tse | |
| 2011 | Empire of Assassins | | Zhang Tianbao | Mo Tse | |
| 2012 | Zombies Return | | | Xie Miao | |
| 2017 | The Thousand Faces of Dunjia | 奇门遁甲 | | | |
| 2019 | Battle of Ao Lun Prague | | | | |
| 2019 | Matchless Hero Fang Shiyu | | | | |
| 2019 | Thirteen Generals of Dahan | | | | |
| 2019 | Thirteen Generals of Dahan 2 | | | | |
| 2019 | Drunken Chivalrous Conquering the Demons | | | | |
| 2022 | Eye for an Eye | | Cheng-Yi | | |
| 2024 | Eye for an Eye 2 | | Cheng-Yi | | |
| 2025 | Hunt The Wicked | | | Xie Miao | |
| 2025 | The Furious | 火遮眼 | Wang Wei | | |

== Television ==
| Year | Title | Chinese Title | Role | Credited as | Notes |
|---|---|---|---|---|---|
| 2013 | The Legend of Kublai Khan | Chinese: 忽必烈傳奇 | Shiliemen | Xie Miao | |
| 2012 | The Beauties of the Emperor | Chinese: 王的女人 | PangWan (庞万) | | |
