= The Rip (film) =

2026 film by Joe Carnahan

- Release poster
- Directed by: Joe Carnahan
- Screenplay by: Joe Carnahan
- Story by: Joe Carnahan; Michael McGrale
- Produced by: Matt Damon; Ben Affleck; Dani Bernfeld; Luciana Damon
- Starring: Matt Damon; Ben Affleck; Steven Yeun; Teyana Taylor; Sasha Calle; Catalina Sandino Moreno; Scott Adkins; Kyle Chandler
- Cinematography: Juan Miguel Azpiroz
- Edited by: Kevin Hale
- Music by: Clinton Shorter
- Production company: Artists Equity
- Distributed by: Netflix
- Release date: January 16, 2026
- Running time: 113 minutes
- Country: United States
- Language: English
- Budget: $100 million

The Rip is a 2026 American action thriller film written and directed by Joe Carnahan, who developed the story with Michael McGrale. The film stars Matt Damon and Ben Affleck as police officers in the Miami-Dade Police Department narcotics unit. It also stars Steven Yeun, Teyana Taylor, Sasha Calle, Catalina Sandino Moreno, Scott Adkins, and Kyle Chandler.

The film is inspired by the true story of Miami-Dade County Police Captain Chris Casiano, and tells the story of a group of police officers who, during a raid on a hidden cash operation, find their trust broken down as team members suspect each other of trying to steal a large sum of cash.

It was released by Netflix on January 16, 2026, to generally favorable reviews from critics. The production company, Artists Equity, negotiated a first-of-its-kind deal with Netflix that provides the workers involved in the production of the film with a bonus if it performs well on the streaming platform.

== Plot ==
When Captain Jackie Velez of the Miami-Dade Police Department is murdered, suspicion falls on her specialized unit, the Tactical Narcotics Team (TNT), amid rumors of a crew of crooked cops robbing drug houses. Her second-in-command, Lieutenant Dane Dumars, receives a tip about an address in Hialeah and leads his fellow detectives, J.D. Byrne, Mike Ro, Numa Baptiste, and Lolo Salazar, to search the house for illicit money. When asked how much money, Dumars tells each team member a different number.

Desi Molina, the late homeowner's granddaughter, reluctantly lets the team inside. There they discover $20 million in drug cartel cash, hidden in the attic. Dumars, realizing the high risk associated with seizing such a large sum of money, disobeys standard protocol. Refusing to notify higher command, he also confiscates the team's phones. After an uneasy encounter with two local Hialeah officers, the team arm themselves as they count the money on site, per standard procedure. Ro secretly uses a burner phone.

Desi explains that she was instructed to offer a share of the money if the stash was discovered. Dumars becomes suspicious after learning she was once a police informant.

As mysterious calls to the house threaten the team to leave, Byrne confronts Dumars for lying about the original tip, which he refuses to show him. Fearing the lieutenant is preparing to steal the money, Byrne calls DEA Agent Matty Nix, who suggests Dumars may have been involved with Velez's death. Realizing the empty neighborhood is under the cartel's control, Byrne investigates a nearby house alone, and Desi warns Ro that she heard Dumars convince Baptiste and Salazar to help rob the stash.

The power is cut as the house takes heavy gunfire. Salazar is wounded while Dumars and Ro chase off the gunmen. Byrne appears with a cartel lookout from the neighboring house, who calls his boss. He explains they did not attack the detectives and the cartel is willing to abandon their money, but warns that Velez may have been killed by a member of her own team. Byrne and Dumars turn on each other, Ro loses his phone in the scuffle, and the house catches fire as Nix and his team arrive. Leaving Baptiste and Salazar with Desi, the other detectives accompany Nix and the money bags in the back of an armored vehicle.

Dumars reveals that Velez sent him the tip before she was killed, planning to use the house as bait for the crooked heist crew. To force them into action, he led everyone to believe he was stealing the money himself. When the mysterious callers mention the money amount Dumars told Ro, he deduced Ro was in league with the crew, which includes Nix and the Hialeah officers; Nix and his men made the threatening calls and shot at the house, while Ro set the fire. Dumars reveals that in the neighboring house he shared his plan with Byrne, who stole Ro's burner in the scuffle. Ro then uses the burner to confirm Nix's involvement.

Nix opens fire, and the driver Dayo Reyes is killed in the ensuing fight while Ro and Dumars are wounded. Nix admits that he and Ro ambushed Velez, but Byrne had already alerted his FBI agent brother Del, so the crew is cornered by the authorities. Ro is chased down and arrested by Dumars, while Nix leads Byrne on a car chase and crashes. When Nix tries to pull his gun, Byrne shoots him. Having swapped the stolen money with phone books hoarded by Desi's grandmother, the team turns in the real cash. A grateful Desi receives twenty percent of the seizure for her cooperation. On the beach, Dumars and Byrne watch the sun rise in Velez's memory.

== Cast ==
- Matt Damon as Lieutenant Dane Dumars
- Ben Affleck as Detective Sergeant J.D. Byrne
- Steven Yeun as Detective Mike Ro
- Teyana Taylor as Detective Numa Baptiste
- Sasha Calle as Desiree "Desi" Lopez Molina
- Catalina Sandino Moreno as Detective Lolo Salazar
- Scott Adkins as FBI Agent Del Byrne
- Kyle Chandler as DEA Agent Mateo "Matty" Nix
- Néstor Carbonell as Major Thom Vallejo
- Lina Esco as Captain Jackie Velez
- Jose Pablo Cantillo as DEA Agent Dayo Reyes
- Cliff Chamberlain as Officer Junger
- Alex Hernandez as Officer Warwick
- Daisuke Tsuji as FBI Agent Logan Casiano

== Production ==
The film was first announced in June 2024, with Matt Damon and Ben Affleck set to star. The film was written and directed by Joe Carnahan, who also developed the story with Michael McGrale. Damon and Affleck also produced the film at Artists Equity. Shortly after the project had been shopped around for a buyer, Netflix purchased the rights to distribute the film. The contract between Artists Equity and Netflix is notable because the streaming service agreed to pay a one-time bonus to the 1,200 people who worked on the film if the movie meets certain performance benchmarks within its first 90 days. This is a departure from Netflix's usual approach of paying a single, upfront fee.

The film is inspired by the true story of Miami-Dade County Police Captain Chris Casiano; in 2016, Casiano and his narcotics squad's investigation and raid on a Miami Lakes residence uncovered $20 million hidden inside. However, the corrupt cop character in the film is entirely fictional. The character played by Damon is based on Casiano himself; Damon's character is grieving the death of his 10-year-old son, Jake, from cancer. The film's story was inspired by Casiano's real-life son, Jake William Casiano, who died from leukemia in 2021.

Upon signing on, Netflix had certain script stipulations with Damon elaborating: "A standard way to make an action movie, that (Ben Affleck and I) learned, is you usually have three set pieces. One in the first act, one in the second and one in the third and they kinda ramp up. And the big one with all the explosions, you spend most of your money on that one in the third act and that's your kinda finale. Now, they’re like, ‘Can we get a big one in the first five minutes? We want people to stay tuned in ... 'And it wouldn't be terrible if you reiterated the plot three or four times in the dialogue because people are on their phone while they're watching.'"

In October 2024, Teyana Taylor, Sasha Calle, Néstor Carbonell, Catalina Sandino Moreno, and Kyle Chandler joined the cast. In November 2024, Scott Adkins and Lina Esco joined the cast. Principal photography began on October 3, 2024, in Los Angeles, and was expected to wrap on December 11. Additional scenes were also shot in New Jersey in November. Juan Miguel Azpiroz served as the cinematographer.

== Release ==
The Rip was released on January 16, 2026, on Netflix.

== Reception ==
On the review aggregator website Rotten Tomatoes, 77% of 160 critics' reviews are positive, with an average rating of 6.5/10. The website's consensus reads: "Leveraging Ben Affleck and Matt Damon's classic chemistry to texturize a friendship tested by greed, The Rip tears into its potboiler setup with compulsively watchable confidence." On Metacritic, the film has a weighted average score of 63 out of 100 based on 32 critics, indicating "generally favorable" reviews. Travis Andrews of The Washington Post awarded the film 2.5 out of 4 stars, described it as "fine genre fare" apt to please audiences who enjoy crime movies but more likely to disappoint others with clichés and overly long action sequences.

=== Lawsuit ===
On May 7, 2026, two sheriff's deputies of the Miami-Dade Sheriff's Office, Jonathan Santana and Jason Smith, sued Matt Damon and Ben Affleck for defamation, claiming that their portrayal in the film made them look like "dirty cops" and caused "substantial harm" to their reputations. (Note: Attributed to multiple sources:) In an interview with WSVN, Santana stated, "When you rip something, you're stealing something. We never stole a dollar. [They're] pretty much saying, you know, how many buckets of money did I steal?" In the defamation lawsuit, Santana and Smith argued that the film used too many real-life details in its story, harming the reputation of the officers.
