= Normal (2025 film) =

American action film by Ben Wheatley

- Theatrical release poster
- Directed by: Ben Wheatley
- Screenplay by: Derek Kolstad
- Story by: Derek Kolstad; Bob Odenkirk
- Produced by: Marc Provissiero; Bob Odenkirk; Derek Kolstad
- Starring: Bob Odenkirk; Henry Winkler; Lena Headey
- Cinematography: Armando Salas
- Edited by: Jonathan Amos
- Music by: Harry Gregson-Williams; Ryder McNair
- Production companies: OPE Partners; Tradecraft Productions; Le Foole Inc
- Distributed by: Magnolia Pictures
- Release dates: September 7, 2025 (TIFF); April 17, 2026 (United States)
- Running time: 91 minutes
- Country: United States
- Languages: English; Japanese
- Budget: <$20 million
- Box office: $6 million

Normal is a 2025 American action thriller film directed by Ben Wheatley from a screenplay by Derek Kolstad, based on a story he co-wrote with Bob Odenkirk. The film stars Odenkirk, Henry Winkler, and Lena Headey. The story—set in the fictitious, titular town of Normal, Minnesota—follows a newly arrived interim sheriff who investigates a town-wide conspiracy after a botched bank robbery.

The film premiered in the Midnight Madness program at the 2025 Toronto International Film Festival on September 7, 2025. It was theatrically released in the United States by Magnolia Pictures on April 17, 2026. It received generally positive reviews from critics.

== Plot ==
Ulysses begins serving as interim sheriff of Normal, Minnesota, where he is chiefly occupied with nuisance reports from the residents of the prosperous small town. Upon arriving, he notices unusual things about the town, like a heavily stocked police station armory, but mostly dismisses them. He is introduced to the town's egotistical mayor and bonds with Moira, a world-weary barkeep. However, he begins to have nagging suspicions about the death of the previous sheriff, and later encounters the sheriff's drunk and distraught non-binary child, Alex, who he locks up in the police station to sober up.

Lori and Keith, a couple passing through town, ineptly attempt to rob the bank. Ulysses, who had briefly met them at his motel, enters the bank to calm the situation. However, Blaine, one of his deputies, receives orders to kill Ulysses. He shoots him in the back, but after seeing that he hit his ballistic vest, the deputies begin indiscriminately shooting into the bank, killing several people while Ulysses, Lori and Keith take cover. Ulysses discovers that the bank vault contains an inordinate amount of cash, gold bars, and military weapons.

The mayor calls Ulysses and explains that the town is safeguarding the property of a yakuza crime syndicate, which has enriched the residents who are all willing to keep it secret and secure. He offers Ulysses the opportunity to join them as permanent sheriff if he kills the robbers; Ulysses instead decides to protect Lori and Keith. After accidentally killing the mayor with a grenade launcher, they fight their way out of the bank and through the town in the midst of a blizzard that disrupts power and communications, experiencing numerous violent encounters with the deputies and armed townsfolk. Meanwhile, a coded message sent during the robbery alerts the yakuza leaders in Japan. Unable to contact the town, they dispatch a team on a private plane to resolve the threat to their operation.

Ulysses escorts Lori and Keith to a snowplow, which the couple use to escape from the town through the storm. Ulysses then returns to the police station, where he is ambushed by Moira. Moira confesses to killing the sheriff, who had wanted to leave Normal for Alex's sake, and prepares to kill Ulysses; however Alex intervenes and avenges their father's death by killing Moira. Ulysses deputizes Alex and sends them to plant explosives from the police station in the bank vault and uses this as leverage to force a deal with the remaining townspeople. Under Ulysses's guidance, the town stages a car crash at the bank in order to cover up the attempted robbery and convince the yakuza that everything is under control.

When the yakuza arrive, they accept the staged accident and are satisfied that their property remains secure. The townsfolk and yakuza then have a celebratory dinner. During the gathering, a loaded shotgun mounted on the wall of the restaurant accidentally discharges, killing the yakuza leader. The incident triggers a violent melee from which only Ulysses, Alex, and Blaine survive.

The film ends with Ulysses and Alex in rural Texas, where they are working together on another substitute sheriff assignment, with Blaine serving as the new sheriff of Normal.

== Cast ==
- Bob Odenkirk as Sheriff Ulysses
- Henry Winkler as Mayor Kibner
- Lena Headey as Moira, a bartender Ulysses befriends
- Reena Jolly as Lori
- Ryan Allen as Deputy Blaine Anderson
- Billy MacLellan as Deputy Mike Nelson
- Brendan Fletcher as Keith
- Peter Shinkoda as Joe
- Jess McLeod as Alex Gunderson, sheriff Gunderson's child

== Production ==
Derek Kolstad had written a script for Normal prior to filming the 2021 film Nobody, and while working on that film together, he and Bob Odenkirk discussed the project and decided it would make for another good collaboration between the two. The script had action, but also Hitchcockian crime-thriller and mystery elements. Kolstad and Odenkirk further developed the story to the final screenplay, and the project was taken to the 2024 European Film Market, packaged with Ben Wheatley directing and Odenkirk starring.

Principal photography began on October 21, 2024, in Winnipeg with a cast reported in November 2024 that also includes Henry Winkler, Lena Headey, Reena Jolly, Ryan Allen, Billy MacLellan, Brendan Fletcher, Peter Shinkoda, and Jess McLeod. Harry Gregson-Williams and Ryder McNair composed the score for the film.

== Release ==
The companies that the film was sold to in pre-sales at the EFM included Sky Cinema for the United Kingdom, Amazon MGM Studios for Canada, Scandinavia, Australia and New Zealand, Metropolitan Filmexport for France and Leonine Studios in Germany.

The film was selected for the Midnight Madness program at the 2025 Toronto International Film Festival, premiering September 7, 2025. Later that month, Magnolia Pictures acquired U.S. distribution rights to the film, scheduling it for a theatrical release in the United States on April 17, 2026, across 2,000 theaters, the company's widest release to date.

== Reception ==
=== Box office ===
In the United States and Canada, Normal was released alongside Lee Cronin's The Mummy, and was projected to gross around $3 million from 2,027 theaters in its opening weekend. It opened to $2.65 million.

=== Critical response ===
On the review aggregator website Rotten Tomatoes, 77% of 164 critics' reviews are positive, with an average rating of 6.4/10. The website's consensus reads: "Normal thrives on Bob Odenkirk's gruff yet playful presence and director Ben Wheatley's over-the-top carnage, delivering simple, ridiculous, and consistently entertaining thrills despite its familiar premise." Metacritic, which uses a weighted average, assigned the film a score of 63 out of 100, based on 29 critics, indicating "generally favorable" reviews. Audiences polled by CinemaScore gave the film an average grade of "C+" on an A+ to F scale.

For Deadline Hollywood, Pete Hammond wrote that "Odenkirk rules this roost just as he does in the Nobody movies, but with the firepower Wheatley keeps shooting Normal manages to exceed those action levels if you can believe it."
