= 29th Critics' Choice Awards =

2024 US film and television awards

- Date: January 14, 2024
- Site: Barker Hangar, Santa Monica, California, United States
- Hosted by: Chelsea Handler

Highlights
- Most wins: Film: Oppenheimer (8); Television: The Bear / Beef (4)
- Most nominations: Film: Barbie (18); Television: The Morning Show (6)
- Best Picture: Oppenheimer
- Best Comedy Series: The Bear
- Best Drama Series: Succession
- Best Limited Series: Beef
- Best Movie Made for Television: Quiz Lady
- Website: www.criticschoice.com

Television/radio coverage
- Network: The CW

The 29th Critics' Choice Awards were presented on January 14, 2024, at the Barker Hangar at the Santa Monica Airport in Santa Monica, California, honoring the finest achievements of filmmaking and television programming in 2023. The ceremony was broadcast on The CW and hosted by stand-up comedian Chelsea Handler for the second consecutive year.

Like in the previous three years, film and television nominations were announced separately. The television nominations were announced on December 5, 2023. The film nominations were announced on December 13, 2023.

The ceremony was originally due to take place at the Fairmont Century Plaza, the Critics Choice Awards' home base which the Critics Choice Association (CCA) helped re-open in 2022, but was later moved to Santa Monica's Barker Hangar, due to a labor dispute at the Fairmont Century Plaza.

Barbie led the film nominations with a record-breaking eighteen, followed by Oppenheimer and Poor Things with thirteen each. The Morning Show led the television nominations with six, followed by Succession with five. Additionally, the cultural phenomenon of "Barbenheimer" received a total of 31 nominations, winning fourteen: 8 for Oppenheimer and 6 for Barbie.

Overall, Warner Bros. Pictures received a total of 25 nominations for film, the most for any studio this year; HBO / Max received a total of 23 nominations for television, the most for any network this year.

== Winners and nominees ==
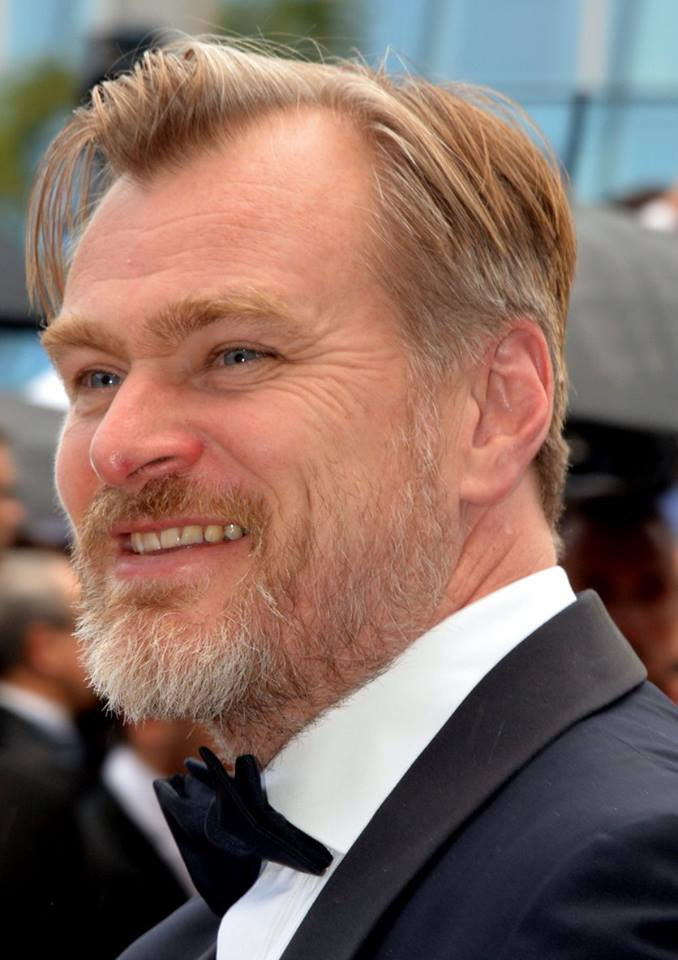
Christopher Nolan, Best Director winner

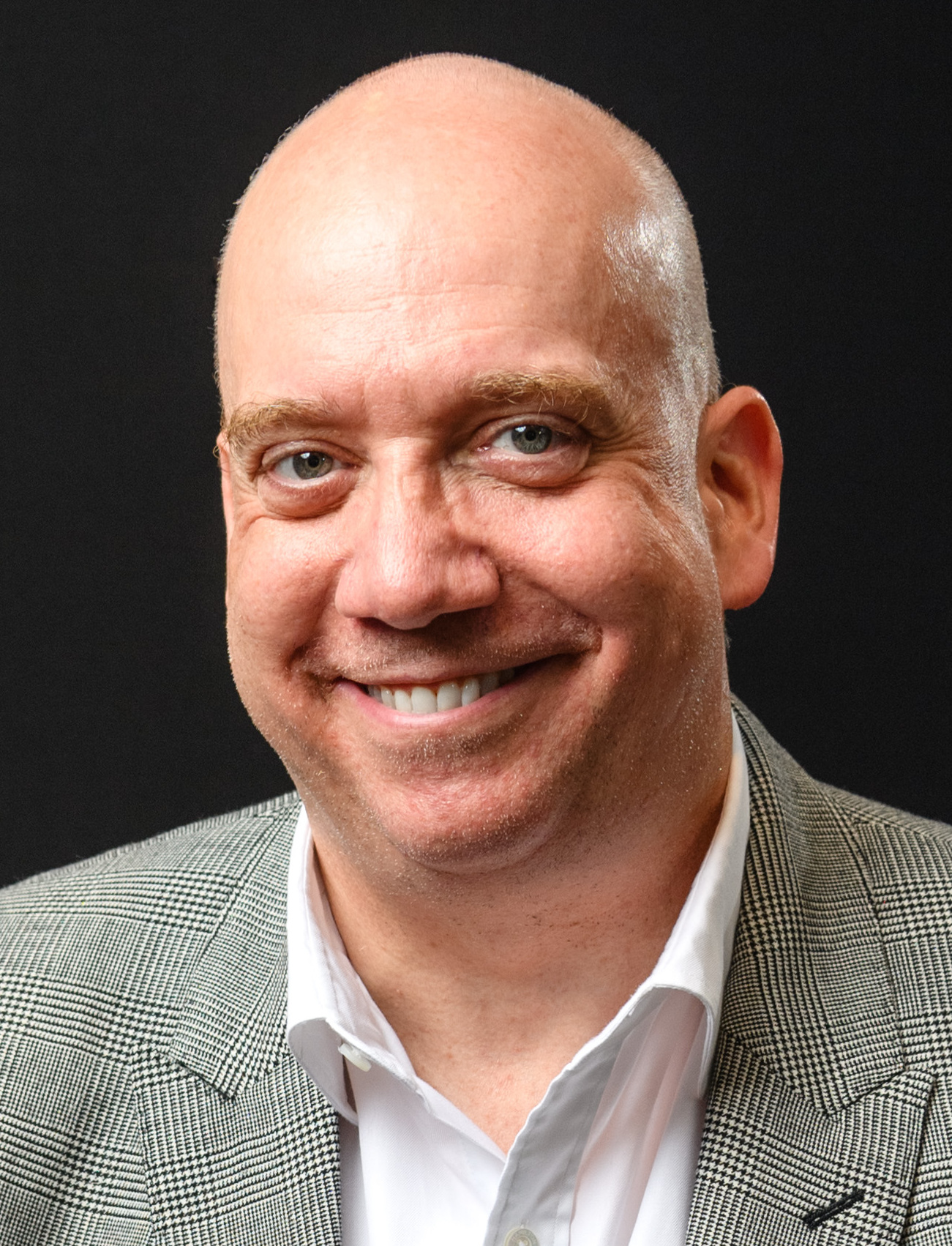
Paul Giamatti, Best Actor winner

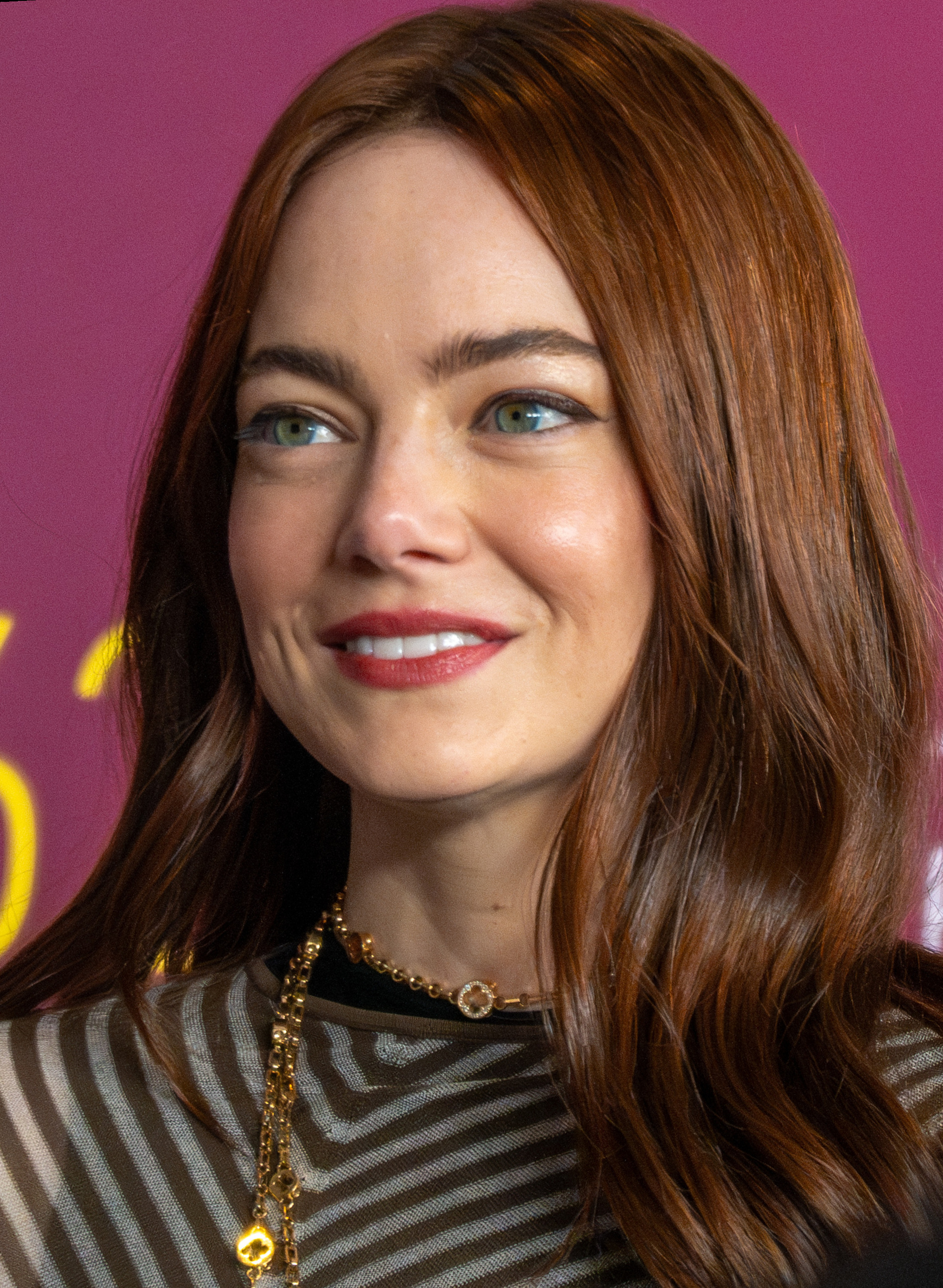
Emma Stone, Best Actress winner

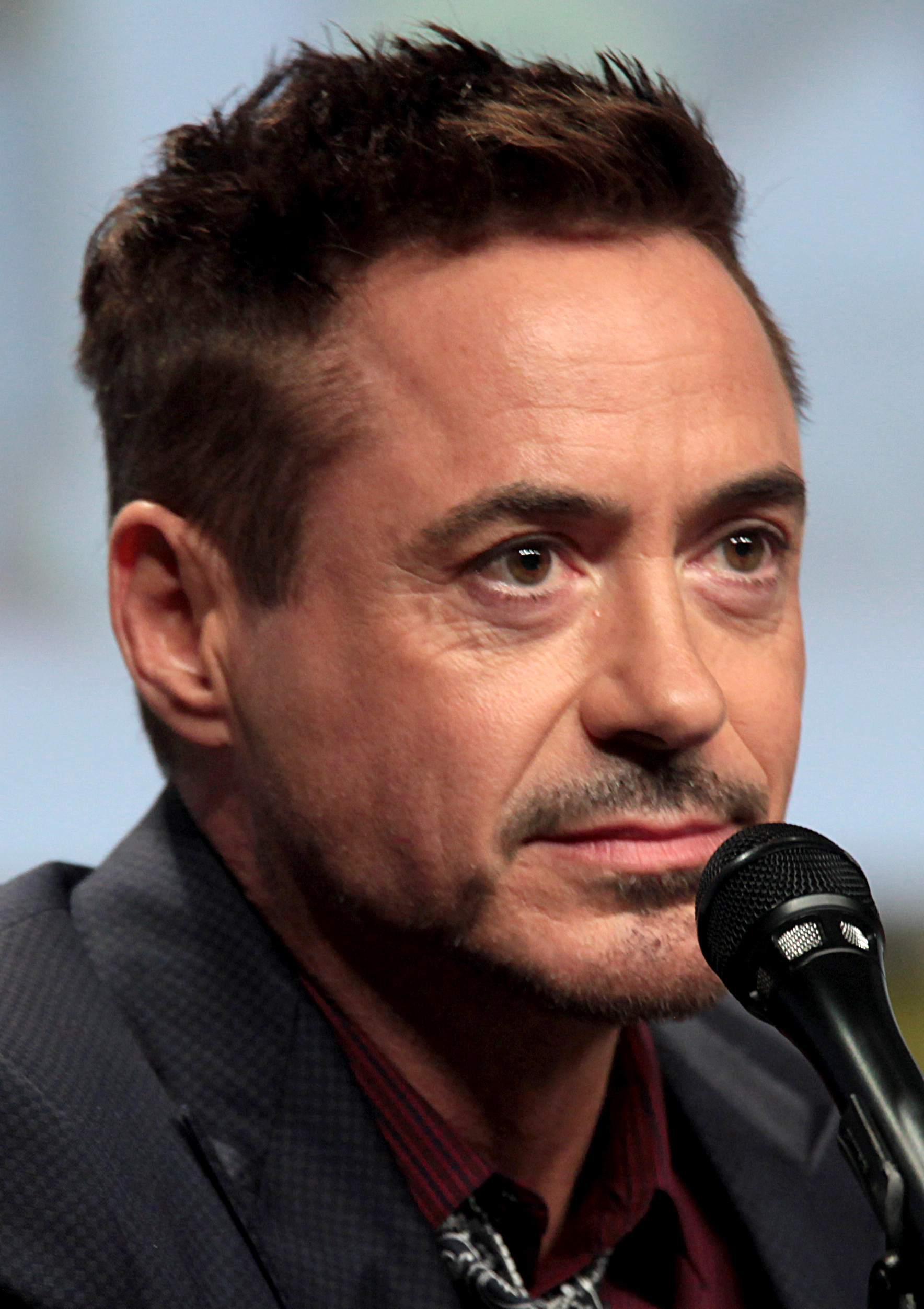
Robert Downey Jr., Best Supporting Actor winner

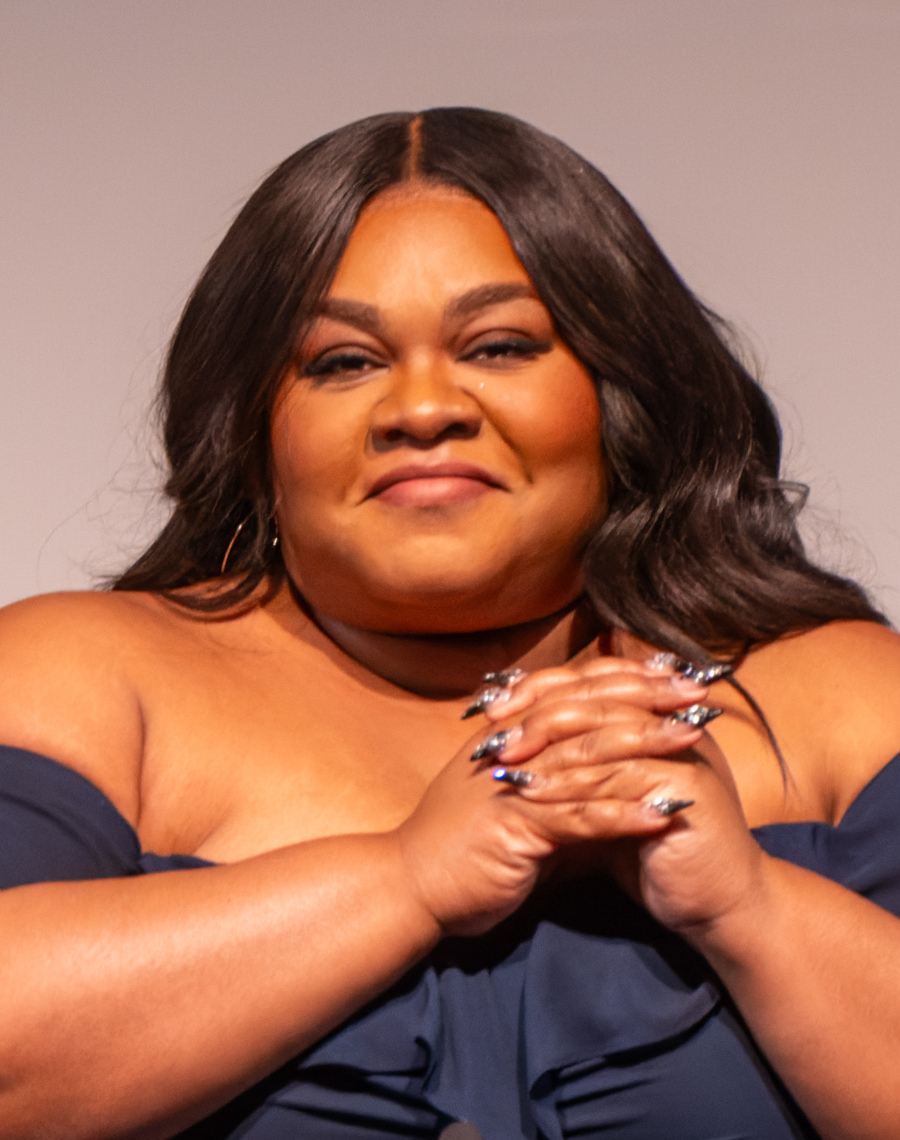
Da'Vine Joy Randolph, Best Supporting Actress winner

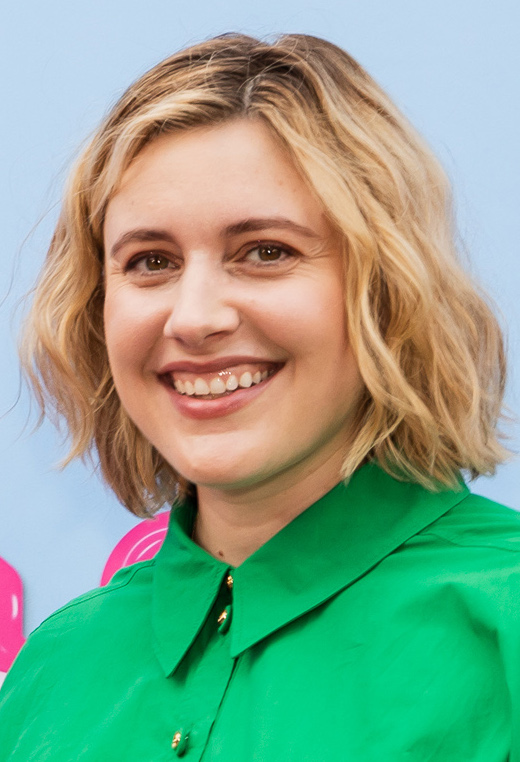
Greta Gerwig, Best Original Screenplay co-winner

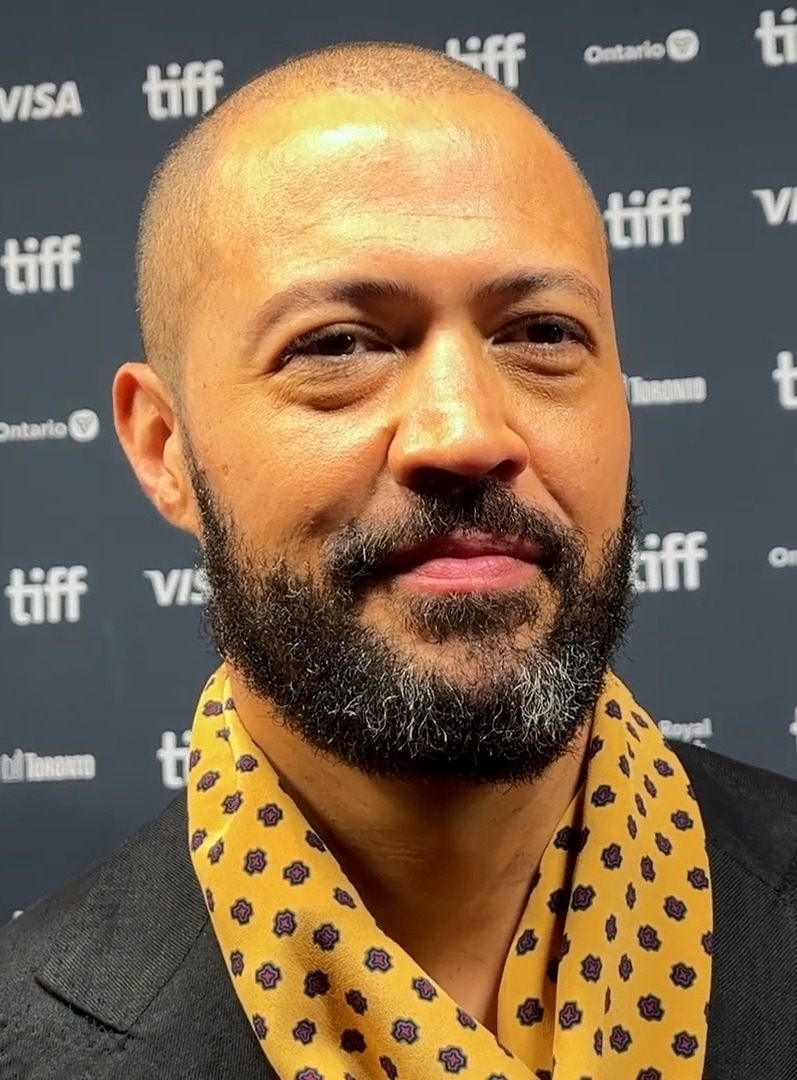
Cord Jefferson, Best Adapted Screenplay winner

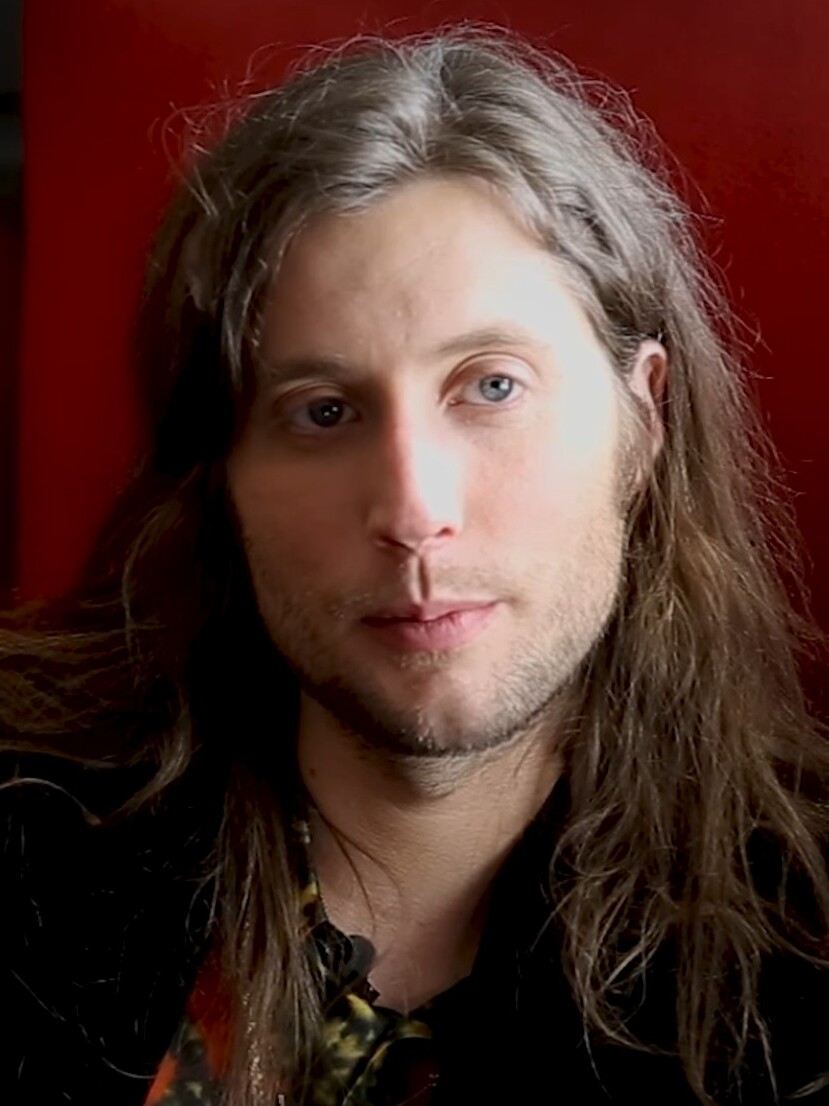
Ludwig Göransson, Best Score winner

=== Film ===
Best Picture: Oppenheimer; American Fiction; Barbie; The Color Purple; The Holdovers; Killers of the Flower Moon; Maestro; Past Lives; Poor Things (Note: Nominated for Best Science Fiction/Fantasy Movie at the 4th Critics' Choice Super Awards); Saltburn	Best Director: Christopher Nolan – Oppenheimer; Bradley Cooper – Maestro; Greta Gerwig – Barbie; Yorgos Lanthimos – Poor Things; Alexander Payne – The Holdovers; Martin Scorsese – Killers of the Flower Moon
Best Actor: Paul Giamatti – The Holdovers as Paul Hunham; Bradley Cooper – Maestro as Leonard Bernstein; Leonardo DiCaprio – Killers of the Flower Moon as Ernest Burkhart; Colman Domingo – Rustin as Bayard Rustin; Cillian Murphy – Oppenheimer as J. Robert Oppenheimer; Jeffrey Wright – American Fiction as Thelonious "Monk" Ellison	Best Actress: Emma Stone – Poor Things as Bella Baxter (Note: Won Best Actress in a Science Fiction/Fantasy Movie at the 4th Critics' Choice Super Awards); Lily Gladstone – Killers of the Flower Moon as Mollie Burkhart; Sandra Hüller – Anatomy of a Fall as Sandra Voyter; Greta Lee – Past Lives as Nora Moon; Carey Mulligan – Maestro as Felicia Montealegre; Margot Robbie – Barbie as Barbie
Best Supporting Actor: Robert Downey Jr. – Oppenheimer as Lewis Strauss; Sterling K. Brown – American Fiction as Clifford "Cliff" Ellison; Robert De Niro – Killers of the Flower Moon as William King Hale; Ryan Gosling – Barbie as Ken; Charles Melton – May December as Joe Yoo; Mark Ruffalo – Poor Things as Duncan Wedderburn (Note: Won Best Actor in a Science Fiction/Fantasy Movie at the 4th Critics' Choice Super Awards)	Best Supporting Actress: Da'Vine Joy Randolph – The Holdovers as Mary Lamb; Emily Blunt – Oppenheimer as Kitty Oppenheimer; Danielle Brooks – The Color Purple as Sofia; America Ferrera – Barbie as Gloria; Jodie Foster – Nyad as Bonnie Stoll; Julianne Moore – May December as Gracie
Best Young Actor/Actress: Dominic Sessa – The Holdovers as Angus Tully; Abby Ryder Fortson – Are You There God? It's Me, Margaret. as Margaret Simon; Ariana Greenblatt – Barbie as Sasha; Calah Lane – Wonka as Noodle; Milo Machado-Graner – Anatomy of a Fall as Daniel Maleski; Madeleine Yuna Voyles – The Creator as Alpha-O / "Alphie" (Note: Nominated for Best Actress in a Science Fiction/Fantasy Movie at the 4th Critics' Choice Super Awards)	Best Acting Ensemble: Oppenheimer; Air; Barbie; The Color Purple; The Holdovers; Killers of the Flower Moon
Best Original Screenplay: Greta Gerwig and Noah Baumbach – Barbie; Samy Burch – May December; Alex Convery – Air; Bradley Cooper and Josh Singer – Maestro; David Hemingson – The Holdovers; Celine Song – Past Lives	Best Adapted Screenplay: Cord Jefferson – American Fiction; Kelly Fremon Craig – Are You There God? It's Me, Margaret.; Andrew Haigh – All of Us Strangers; Tony McNamara – Poor Things; Christopher Nolan – Oppenheimer; Eric Roth and Martin Scorsese – Killers of the Flower Moon
Best Cinematography: Hoyte van Hoytema – Oppenheimer; Matthew Libatique – Maestro; Rodrigo Prieto – Barbie; Rodrigo Prieto – Killers of the Flower Moon; Robbie Ryan – Poor Things; Linus Sandgren – Saltburn	Best Editing: Jennifer Lame – Oppenheimer; William Goldenberg – Air; Nick Houy – Barbie; Yorgos Mavropsaridis – Poor Things; Thelma Schoonmaker – Killers of the Flower Moon; Michelle Tesoro – Maestro
Best Costume Design: Jacqueline Durran – Barbie; Lindy Hemming – Wonka; Francine Jamison-Tanchuck – The Color Purple; Holly Waddington – Poor Things; Jacqueline West – Killers of the Flower Moon; Janty Yates and David Crossman – Napoleon	Best Production Design: Sarah Greenwood and Katie Spencer – Barbie; Suzie Davies and Charlotte Dirickx – Saltburn; Ruth De Jong and Claire Kaufman – Oppenheimer; Jack Fisk and Adam Willis – Killers of the Flower Moon; Shona Heath, Zsuzsa Mihalek, and James Price – Poor Things; Adam Stockhausen and Kris Moran – Asteroid City
Best Score: Ludwig Göransson – Oppenheimer; Jerskin Fendrix – Poor Things; Michael Giacchino – Society of the Snow; Daniel Pemberton – Spider-Man: Across the Spider-Verse; Robbie Robertson – Killers of the Flower Moon (posthumous); Mark Ronson and Andrew Wyatt – Barbie	Best Song: "I'm Just Ken" – Barbie; "Dance the Night" – Barbie; "Peaches" – The Super Mario Bros. Movie; "Road to Freedom" – Rustin; "This Wish" – Wish; "What Was I Made For?" – Barbie
Best Hair and Makeup: Barbie; The Color Purple; Maestro; Oppenheimer; Poor Things; Priscilla	Best Visual Effects: Oppenheimer; The Creator; Guardians of the Galaxy Vol. 3 (Note: Nominated for Best Science Fiction/Fantasy Movie at the 4th Critics' Choice Super Awards); Mission: Impossible – Dead Reckoning Part One (Note: Nominated for Best Action Movie at the 4th Critics' Choice Super Awards); Poor Things; Spider-Man: Across the Spider-Verse
Best Comedy: Barbie; American Fiction; Bottoms; The Holdovers; No Hard Feelings; Poor Things	Best Animated Feature: Spider-Man: Across the Spider-Verse (Note: Won Best Superhero Movie at the 4th Critics' Choice Super Awards); The Boy and the Heron; Elemental; Nimona; Teenage Mutant Ninja Turtles: Mutant Mayhem; Wish
Best Foreign Language Film: Anatomy of a Fall • France; Godzilla Minus One (Note: Won Best Science Fiction/Fantasy Movie at the 4th Critics' Choice Awards) • Japan; Perfect Days • Japan; Society of the Snow • Spain; The Taste of Things • France; The Zone of Interest • United Kingdom

==== #SeeHer Award ====
- America Ferrera

==== Career Achievement Award ====
- Harrison Ford

=== Television ===
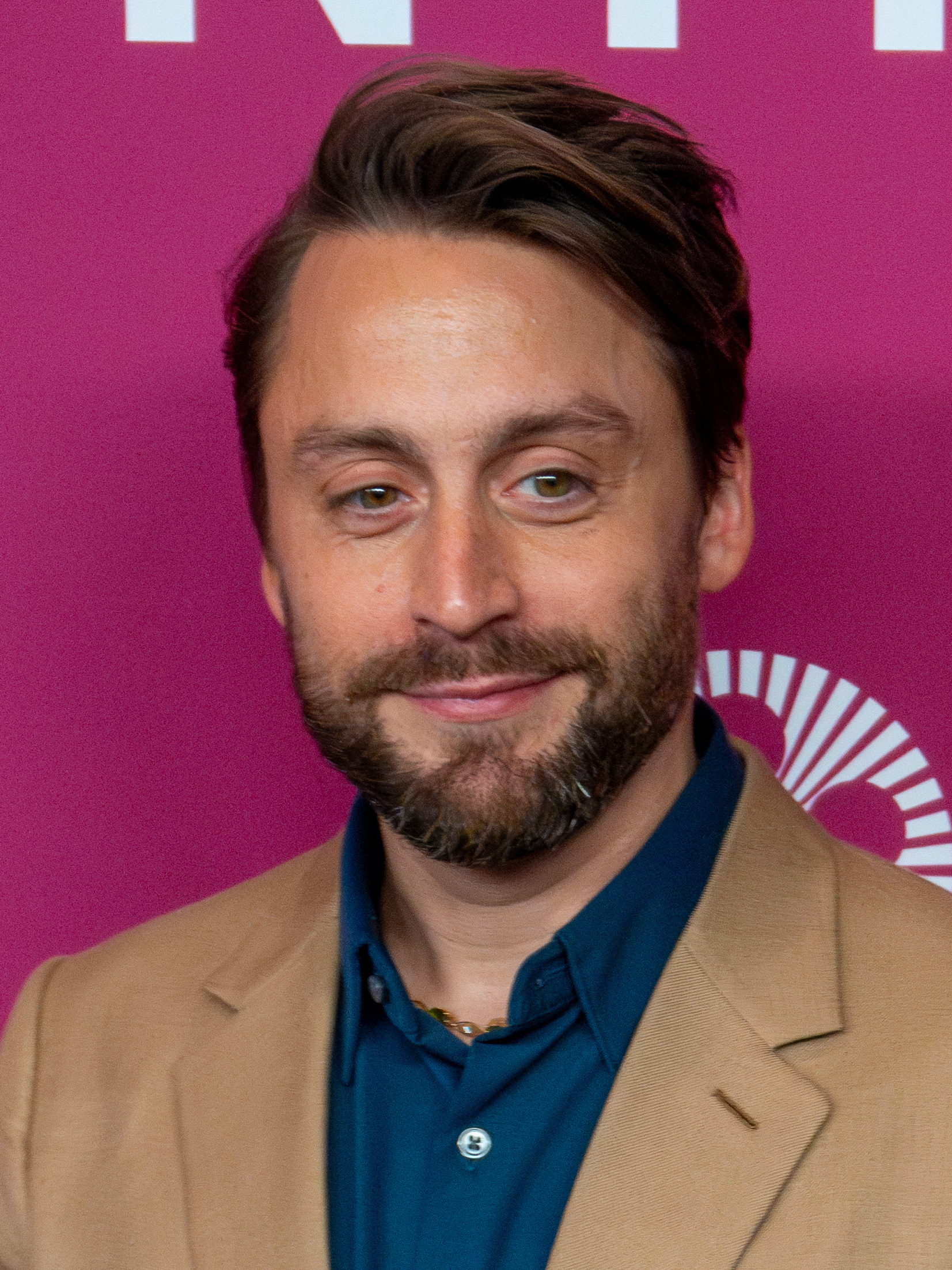
Kieran Culkin, Best Actor in a Drama Series winner

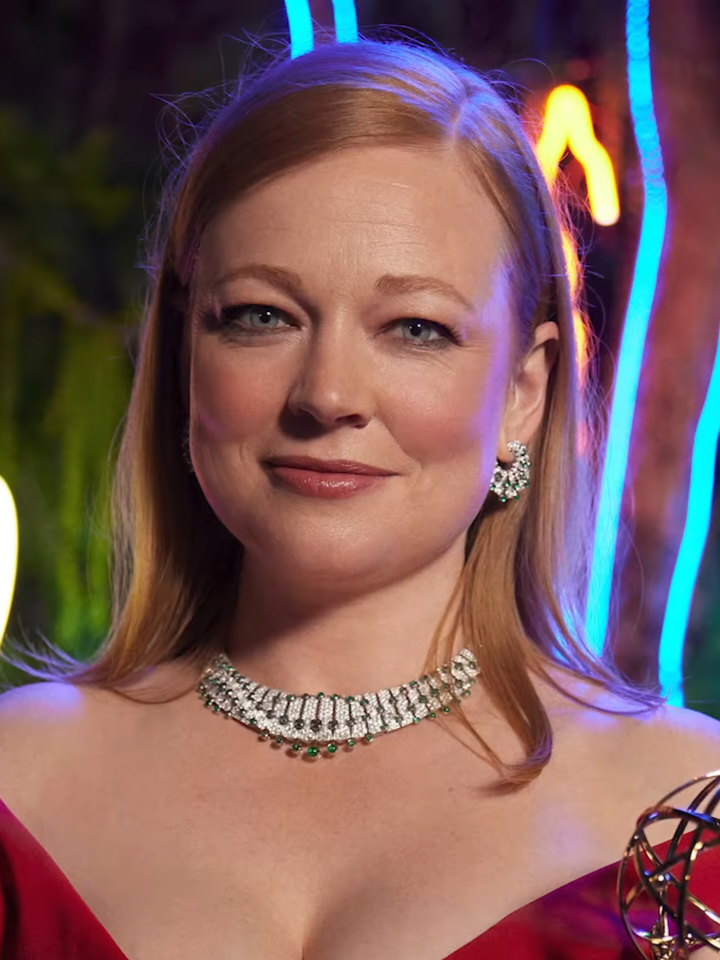
Sarah Snook, Best Actress in a Drama Series winner

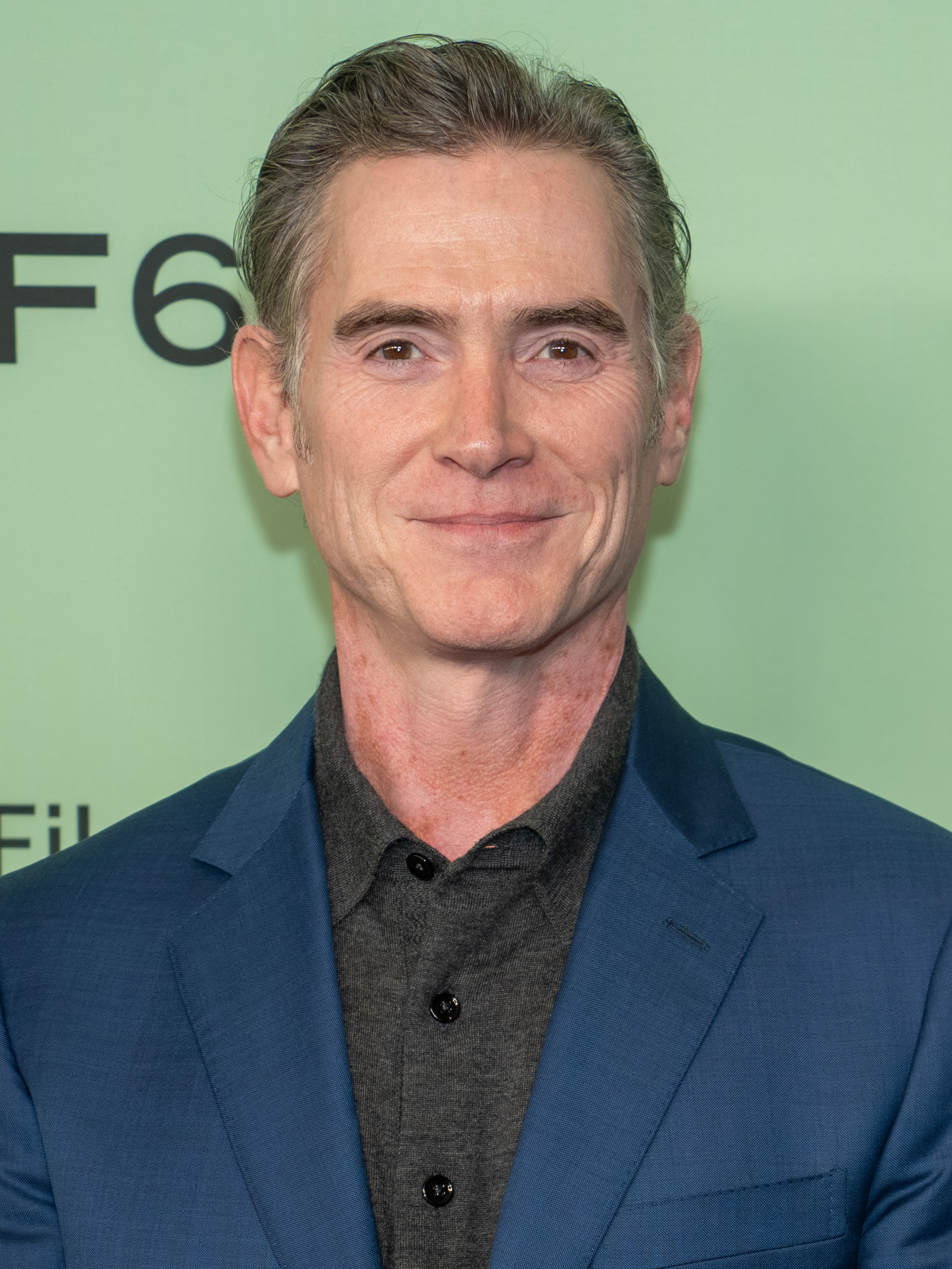
Billy Crudup, Best Supporting Actor in a Drama Series winner

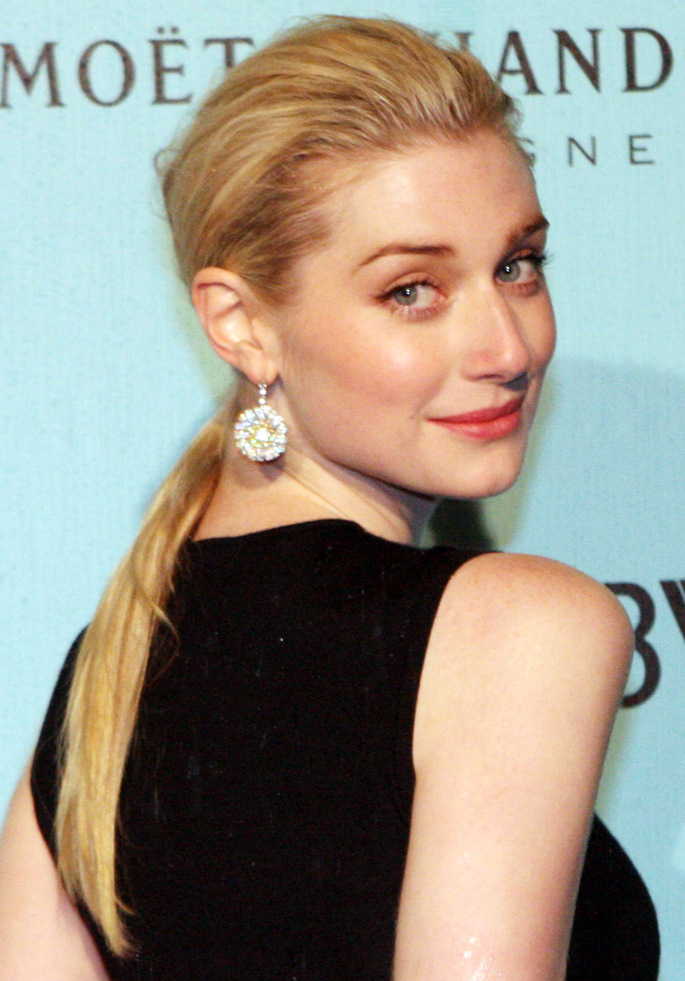
Elizabeth Debicki, Best Supporting Actress in a Drama Series winner

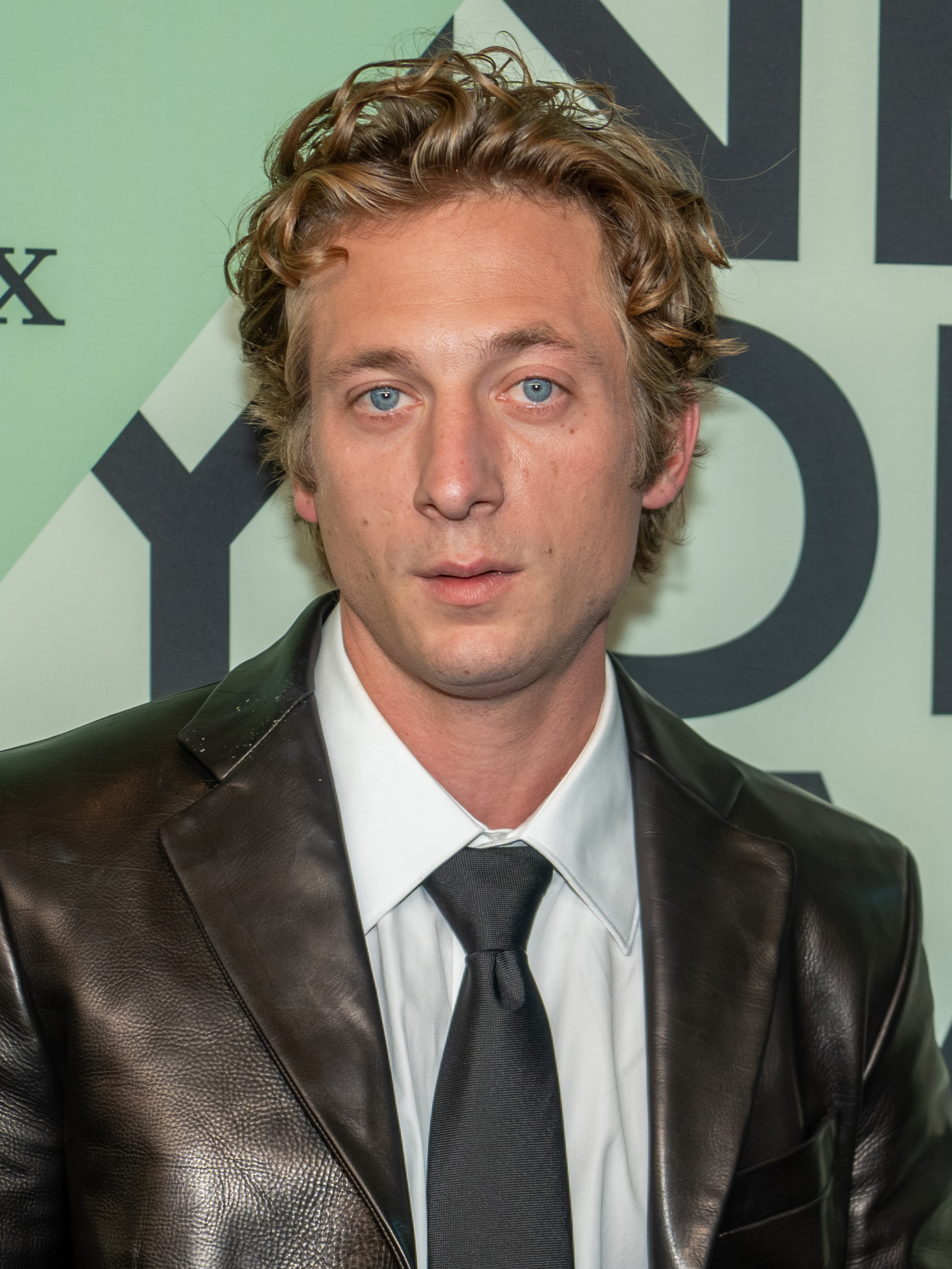
Jeremy Allen White, Best Actor in a Comedy Series winner

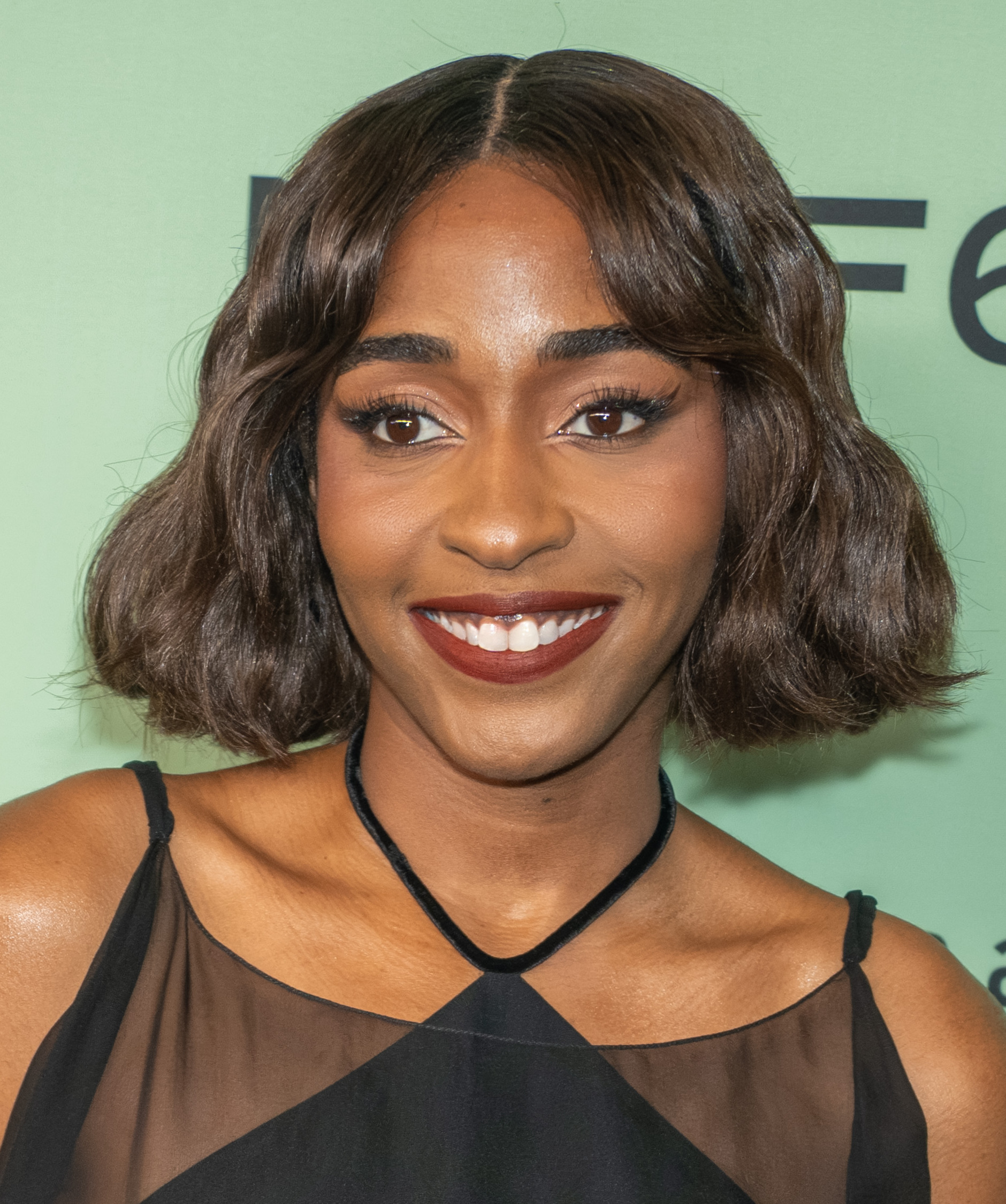
Ayo Edebiri, Best Lead Actress in a Comedy Series winner

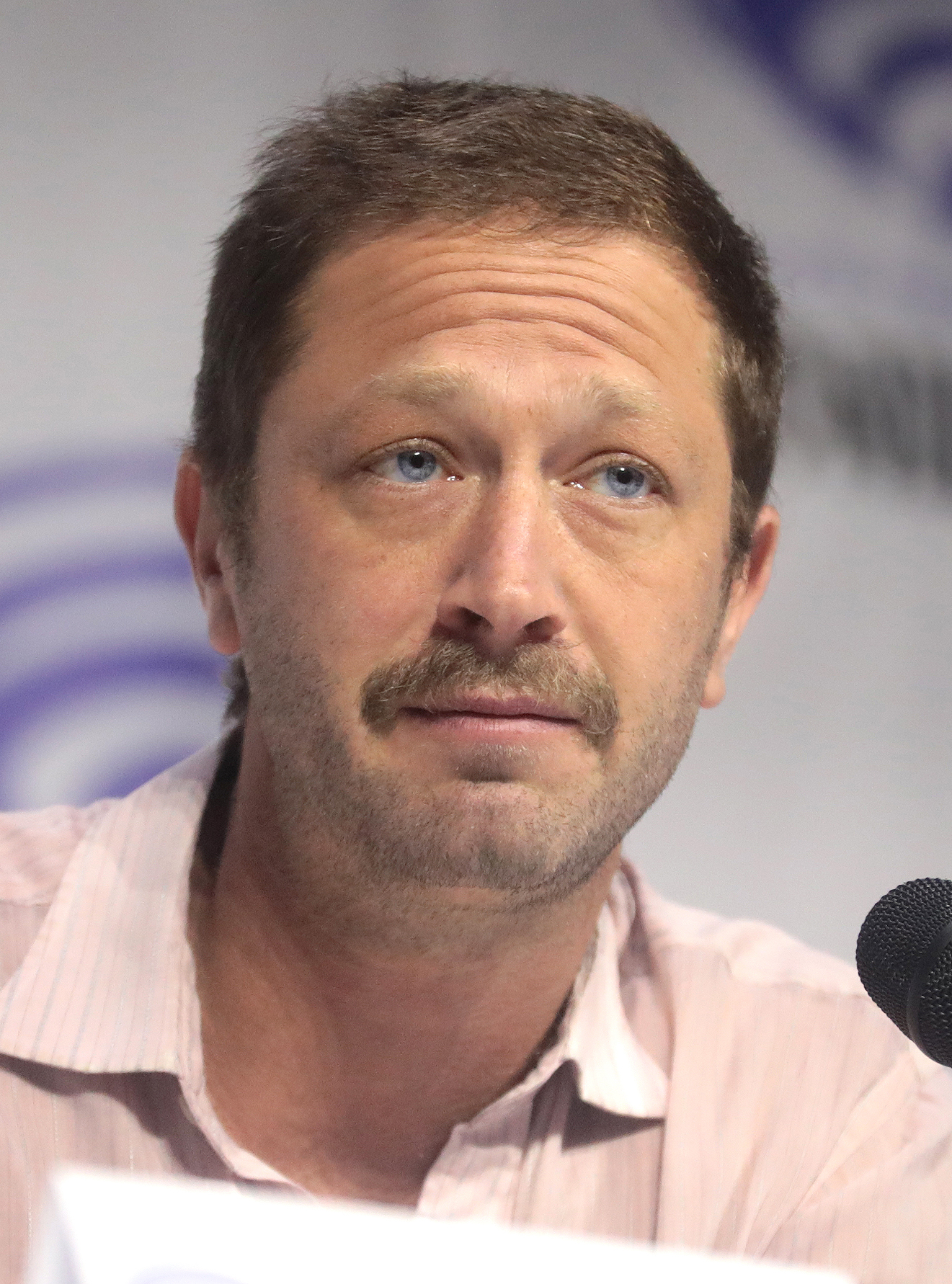
Ebon Moss-Bachrach, Best Supporting Actor in a Comedy Series winner

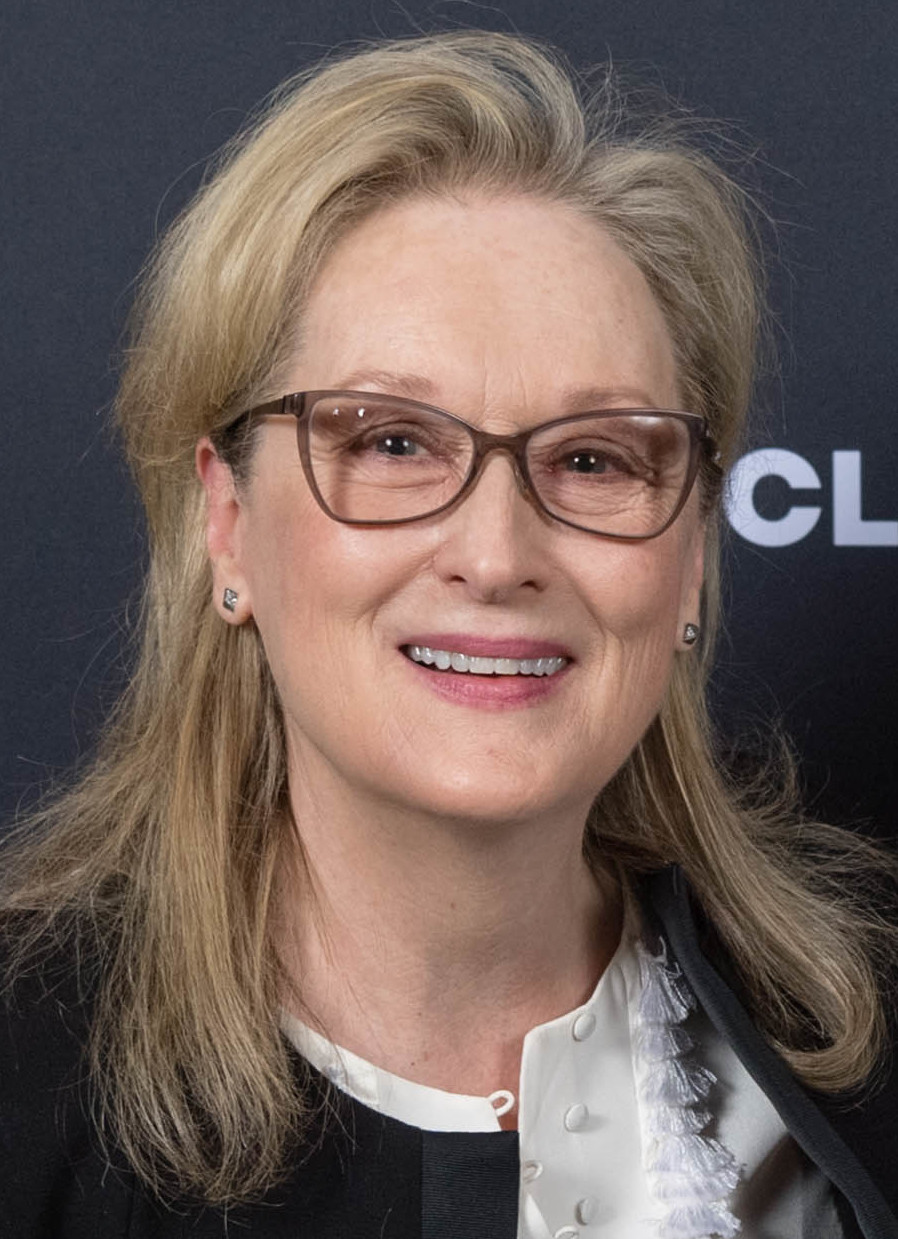
Meryl Streep, Best Supporting Actress in a Comedy Series winner

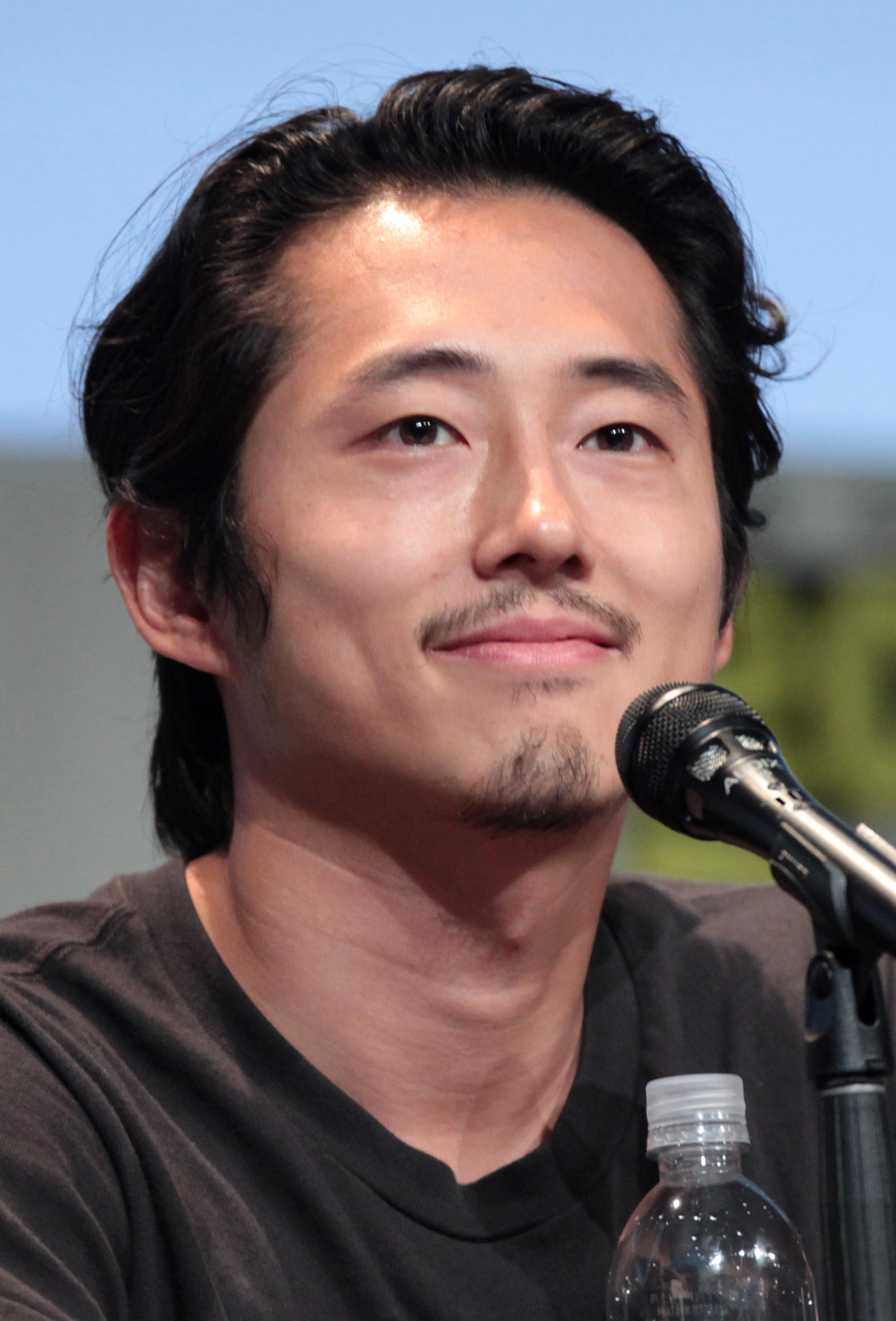
Steven Yeun, Best Actor in a Limited Series or Movie Made for Television winner

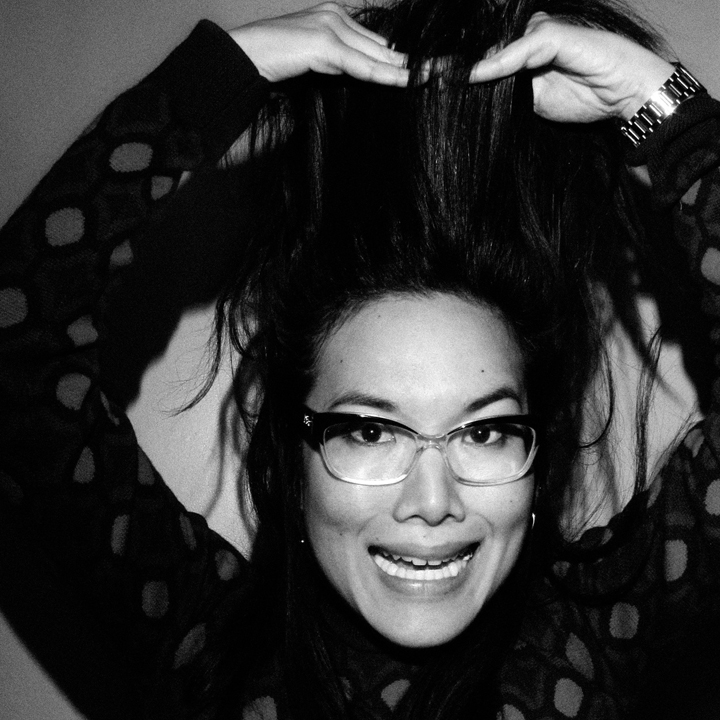
Ali Wong, Best Actress in a Limited Series or Movie Made for Television winner

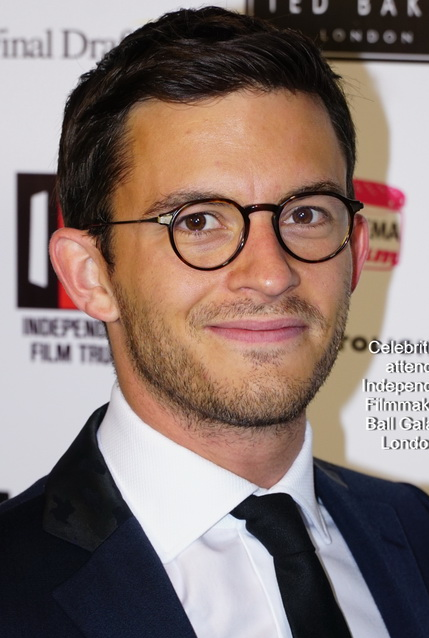
Jonathan Bailey, Best Supporting Actor in a Limited Series or Movie Made for Television winner

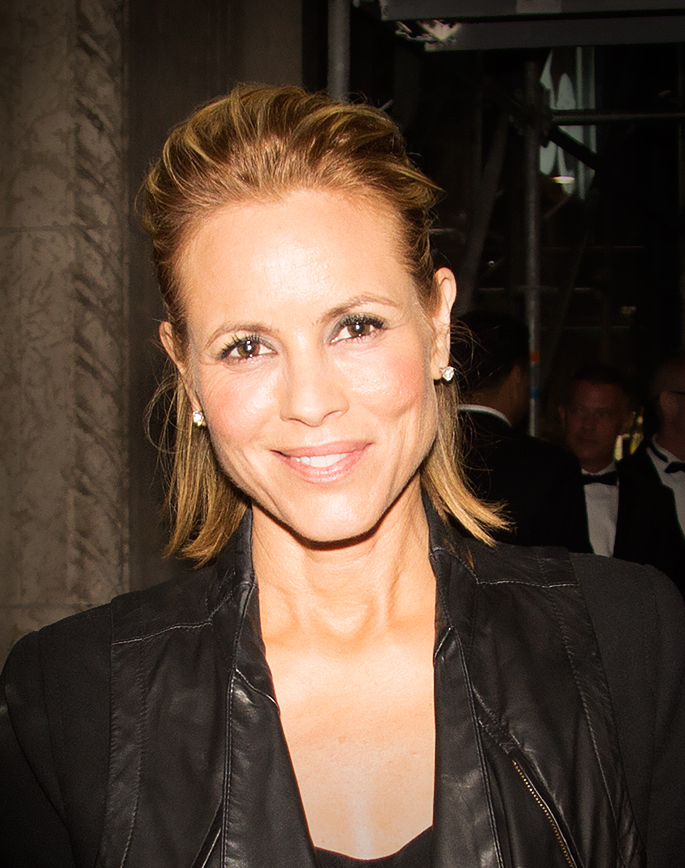
Maria Bello, Best Supporting Actress in a Limited Series or Movie Made for Television winner

Best Drama Series: Succession (HBO / Max); The Crown (Netflix); The Diplomat (Netflix); The Last of Us (HBO / Max) (Note: Won Best Horror Series, Limited Series or Made-for-TV Movie and Best Superhero Series, Limited Series or Made-for-TV Movie at the 4th Critics' Choice Super Awards); Loki (Disney+) (Note: Nominated for Best Superhero Series, Limited Series or Made-for-TV Movie at the 4th Critics' Choice Super Awards); The Morning Show (Apple TV+); Star Trek: Strange New Worlds (Paramount+) (Note: Nominated for Best Science Fiction/Fantasy Series, Limited Series or Made-for-TV Movie at the 4th Critics' Choice Super Awards); Winning Time: The Rise of the Lakers Dynasty (HBO / Max)
Best Actor in a Drama Series: Kieran Culkin – Succession as Roman Roy (HBO / Max); Tom Hiddleston – Loki as Loki (Disney+) (Note: Nominated for Best Actor in a Superhero Series, Limited Series or Made-for-TV Movie at the 4th Critics' Choice Super Awards); Timothy Olyphant – Justified: City Primeval as Raylan Givens (FX); Pedro Pascal – The Last of Us as Joel Miller (HBO / Max) (Note: Won Best Actor in a Horror Series, Limited Series or Made-for-TV Movie and Best Actor in a Superhero Series, Limited Series or Made-for-TV Movie at the 4th Critics' Choice Super Awards); Ramón Rodríguez – Will Trent as Will Trent (ABC); Jeremy Strong – Succession as Kendall Roy (HBO / Max)	Best Actress in a Drama Series: Sarah Snook – Succession as Shiv Roy (HBO / Max); Jennifer Aniston – The Morning Show as Alex Levy (Apple TV+); Aunjanue Ellis – Justified: City Primeval as Carolyn Wilder (FX); Bella Ramsey – The Last of Us as Ellie (HBO / Max) (Note: Won Best Actress in a Horror Series, Limited Series or Made-for-TV Movie and Best Actress in a Superhero Series, Limited Series or Made-for-TV Movie at the 4th Critics' Choice Super Awards); Keri Russell – The Diplomat as Kate Wyler (Netflix); Reese Witherspoon – The Morning Show as Bradley Jackson (Apple TV+)
Best Supporting Actor in a Drama Series: Billy Crudup – The Morning Show as Cory Ellison (Apple TV+); Khalid Abdalla – The Crown as Dodi Fayed (Netflix); Ron Cephas Jones – Truth Be Told as Lukather "Shreve" Scoville (Apple TV+) (posthumous); Matthew Macfadyen – Succession as Tom Wambsgans (HBO / Max); Ke Huy Quan – Loki as O.B. / A.D. Doug, Ph.D (Disney+); Rufus Sewell – The Diplomat as Hal Wyler (Netflix)	Best Supporting Actress in a Drama Series: Elizabeth Debicki – The Crown as Diana, Princess of Wales (Netflix); Nicole Beharie – The Morning Show as Christine Hunter (Apple TV+); Sophia Di Martino – Loki as Sylvie (Disney+) (Note: Nominated for Best Actress in a Superhero Series Limited Series or Made-for-TV Movie at the 4th Critics' Choice Super Awards); Celia Rose Gooding – Star Trek: Strange New Worlds as Nyota Uhura (Paramount+) (Note: Nominated for Best Actress in a Science Fiction/Fantasy Series, Limited Series or Made-for-TV Movie at the 4th Critics' Choice Super Awards); Karen Pittman – The Morning Show as Mia Jordan (Apple TV+); Christina Ricci – Yellowjackets as Misty Quigley (Showtime)
Best Comedy Series: The Bear (FX); Abbott Elementary (ABC); Barry (HBO / Max); The Marvelous Mrs. Maisel (Prime Video); Poker Face (Peacock); Reservation Dogs (FX); Shrinking (Apple TV+); What We Do in the Shadows (FX) (Note: Nominated for Best Horror Series, Limited Series or Made-for-TV Movie at the 4th Critics' Choice Super Awards)
Best Actor in a Comedy Series: Jeremy Allen White – The Bear as Carmen "Carmy" Berzatto (FX); Bill Hader – Barry as Barry Berkman (HBO / Max); Steve Martin – Only Murders in the Building as Charles-Haden Savage (Hulu); Kayvan Novak – What We Do in the Shadows as Nandor the Relentless (FX); Drew Tarver – The Other Two as Cary Dubek (HBO / Max); D'Pharaoh Woon-A-Tai – Reservation Dogs as Bear Smallhill (FX)	Best Actress in a Comedy Series: Ayo Edebiri – The Bear as Sydney Adamu (FX); Rachel Brosnahan – The Marvelous Mrs. Maisel as Miriam "Midge" Maisel (Prime Video); Quinta Brunson – Abbott Elementary as Janine Teagues (ABC); Bridget Everett – Somebody Somewhere as Sam (HBO / Max); Devery Jacobs – Reservation Dogs as Elora Danan Postoak (FX); Natasha Lyonne – Poker Face as Charlie Cale (Peacock)
Best Supporting Actor in a Comedy Series: Ebon Moss-Bachrach – The Bear as Richard "Richie" Jerimovich (FX); Phil Dunster – Ted Lasso as Jamie Tartt (Apple TV+); Harrison Ford – Shrinking as Dr. Paul Rhoades (Apple TV+); Harvey Guillén – What We Do in the Shadows as Guillermo de la Cruz (FX); James Marsden – Jury Duty as Himself (Amazon Freevee); Henry Winkler – Barry as Gene Cousineau (HBO / Max)	Best Supporting Actress in a Comedy Series: Meryl Streep – Only Murders in the Building as Loretta Durkin (Hulu); Paulina Alexis – Reservation Dogs as Willie Jack (FX); Alex Borstein – The Marvelous Mrs. Maisel as Susie Myerson (Prime Video); Janelle James – Abbott Elementary as Ava Coleman (ABC); Sheryl Lee Ralph – Abbott Elementary as Barbara Howard (ABC); Jessica Williams – Shrinking as Gaby (Apple TV+)
Best Limited Series: Beef (Netflix); Daisy Jones & the Six (Prime Video); Fargo (FX); Fellow Travelers (Showtime); Lessons in Chemistry (Apple TV+); Love & Death (HBO / Max); A Murder at the End of the World (FX); A Small Light (National Geographic)	Best Movie Made for Television: Quiz Lady (Hulu); The Caine Mutiny Court-Martial (Showtime); Finestkind (Paramount+); Mr. Monk's Last Case: A Monk Movie (Peacock); No One Will Save You (Hulu); Reality (HBO / Max)
Best Actor in a Limited Series or Movie Made for Television: Steven Yeun – Beef as Danny Cho (Netflix); Matt Bomer – Fellow Travelers as Hawkins "Hawk" Fuller (Showtime); Tom Holland – The Crowded Room as Danny Sullivan (Apple TV+); David Oyelowo – Lawmen: Bass Reeves as Bass Reeves (Paramount+); Tony Shalhoub – Mr. Monk's Last Case: A Monk Movie as Adrian Monk (Peacock); Kiefer Sutherland – The Caine Mutiny Court-Martial as Lt. Commander Queeg (Showtime)	Best Actress in a Limited Series or Movie Made for Television: Ali Wong – Beef as Amy Lau (Netflix); Kaitlyn Dever – No One Will Save You as Brynn (Hulu); Carla Gugino – The Fall of the House of Usher as Verna (Netflix); Brie Larson – Lessons in Chemistry as Elizabeth Zott (Apple TV+); Bel Powley – A Small Light as Miep Gies (National Geographic); Sydney Sweeney – Reality as Reality Winner (HBO / Max); Juno Temple – Fargo as Dorothy "Dot" Lyon (FX)
Best Supporting Actor in a Limited Series or Movie Made for Television: Jonathan Bailey – Fellow Travelers as Tim Laughlin (Showtime); Taylor Kitsch – Painkiller as Glen Kryger (Netflix); Jesse Plemons – Love & Death as Allan Gore (HBO / Max); Lewis Pullman – Lessons in Chemistry as Calvin Evans (Apple TV+); Liev Schreiber – A Small Light as Otto Frank (National Geographic); Justin Theroux – White House Plumbers as G. Gordon Liddy (HBO / Max)	Best Supporting Actress in a Limited Series or Movie Made for Television: Maria Bello – Beef as Jordan Forster (Netflix); Billie Boullet – A Small Light as Anne Frank (National Geographic); Willa Fitzgerald – The Fall of the House of Usher as Young Madeline (Netflix); Aja Naomi King – Lessons in Chemistry as Harriet Sloane (Apple TV+); Mary McDonnell – The Fall of the House of Usher as Madeline Usher (Netflix) (Note: Nominated for Best Villain in a Series, Limited Series or Made-for-TV Movie at the 4th Critics' Choice Super Awards); Camila Morrone – Daisy Jones & the Six as Camila Alvarez (Prime Video)
Best Animated Series: Scott Pilgrim Takes Off (Netflix); Bluey (Disney+); Bob's Burgers (Fox); Harley Quinn (HBO / Max); Star Trek: Lower Decks (Paramount+); Young Love (HBO / Max)	Best Foreign Language Series: Lupin (Netflix) • France; Bargain (Paramount+) • South Korea; The Glory (Netflix) • South Korea; The Good Mothers (Apple TV+) • Italy / United Kingdom; The Interpreter of Silence (Hulu) • Germany / Poland; Mask Girl (Netflix) • South Korea; Moving (Hulu) • South Korea
Best Talk Show: Last Week Tonight with John Oliver (HBO / Max); The Graham Norton Show (BBC America); Jimmy Kimmel Live! (ABC); The Kelly Clarkson Show (NBC); Late Night with Seth Meyers (NBC); The Late Show with Stephen Colbert (CBS)	Best Comedy Special: John Mulaney: Baby J (Netflix); Alex Borstein: Corsets & Clown Suits (Prime Video); John Early: Now More Than Ever (HBO / Max); Mike Birbiglia: The Old Man and the Pool (Netflix); Trevor Noah: Where Was I (Netflix); Wanda Sykes: I'm an Entertainer (Netflix)

== Films with multiple nominations and wins ==
The following twenty films received multiple nominations:

Film	Nominations
Barbie	18
Oppenheimer	13
Poor Things	13
Killers of the Flower Moon	12
The Holdovers	8
Maestro	8
American Fiction	5
The Color Purple	5
Air	3
Anatomy of a Fall	3
May December	3
Past Lives	3
Saltburn	3
Spider-Man: Across the Spider-Verse	3
Are You There God? It's Me, Margaret.	2
The Creator	2
Rustin	2
Society of the Snow	2
Wish	2
Wonka	2

The following three films received multiple awards:

Film	Awards
Oppenheimer	8
Barbie	6
The Holdovers	3

== Television programs with multiple nominations and wins ==
The following twenty-nine series received multiple nominations:

Series	Network(s)	Category	Nominations
The Morning Show	Apple TV+	Drama	6
Succession	HBO / Max	Drama	5
Abbott Elementary	ABC	Comedy	4
The Bear	FX	Comedy	4
Beef	Netflix	Limited	4
Lessons in Chemistry	Apple TV+	Limited	4
Loki	Disney+	Drama	4
Reservation Dogs	FX	Comedy	4
A Small Light	National Geographic	Limited	4
Barry	HBO / Max	Comedy	3
The Crown	Netflix	Drama	3
The Diplomat	Netflix	Drama	3
The Fall of the House of Usher	Netflix	Limited	3
Fellow Travelers	Showtime	Limited	3
The Last of Us	HBO / Max	Drama	3
The Marvelous Mrs. Maisel	Prime Video	Comedy	3
Shrinking	Apple TV+	Comedy	3
What We Do in the Shadows	FX	Comedy	3
The Caine Mutiny Court-Martial	Showtime	Movie	2
Daisy Jones & the Six	Prime Video	Limited	2
Fargo	FX	Limited	2
Justified: City Primeval	FX	Drama	2
Love & Death	HBO / Max	Limited	2
Mr. Monk's Last Case: A Monk Movie	Peacock	Movie	2
No One Will Save You	Hulu	Movie	2
Only Murders in the Building	Hulu	Comedy	2
Poker Face	Peacock	Comedy	2
Reality	HBO / Max	Movie	2
Star Trek: Strange New Worlds	Paramount+	Drama	2

The following three series received multiple awards:

Series	Network(s)	Category	Awards
The Bear	FX	Comedy	4
Beef	Netflix	Limited	4
Succession	HBO / Max	Drama	3

== Presenters ==
Name(s)	Role
Kaley Cuoco; David Oyelowo	Presented the award for Best Supporting Actress
Angela Bassett	Presented the award for Best Supporting Actor
Phil Dunster; Jessica Williams	Presented the awards for Best Supporting Actor in a Limited Series or Movie Made for Television and Best Supporting Actress in a Limited Series or Movie Made for Television
Giacomo Gianniotti; Vanessa Morgan	Presented the awards for Best Supporting Actor in a Drama Series and Best Supporting Actress in a Drama Series
Jenny Slate; Ramy Youssef	Presented the awards for Best Supporting Actor in a Comedy Series and Best Supporting Actress in a Comedy Series
Jason Segel	Presented the award for Best Actress in a Limited Series or Movie Made for Television
Natasha Lyonne	Presented the award for Best Actor in a Limited Series or Movie Made for Television
Margot Robbie	Presented the #SeeHer Award to America Ferrera
Anthony Ramos; Bella Ramsey	Presented the award for Best Song
Nicholas Braun	Presented the award for Best Actress in a Comedy Series
Ashley Madekwe; Mandy Moore	Presented the award for Best Actor in a Comedy Series
David Duchovny; Meg Ryan	Presented the award for Best Acting Ensemble
James Mangold	Presented the Career Achievement Award to Harrison Ford
Ke Huy Quan	Presented the award for Best Actress in a Drama Series
Gael García Bernal; Carla Gugino	Presented the award for Best Actor in a Drama Series
Sandra Oh; Awkwafina	Presented the award for Best Comedy Series
Daniel Levy	Presented the award for Best Drama Series
Jon Cryer; Donald Faison; Abigail Spencer	Presented the award for Best Limited Series
Brendan Fraser	Presented the award for Best Actress
Oprah Winfrey	Presented the award for Best Actor
John Krasinski	Presented the award for Best Director
Chelsea Handler	Presented the award for Best Picture

== See also ==
- 96th Academy Awards
- 75th Primetime Emmy Awards
- 4th Critics' Choice Super Awards
- 8th Critics' Choice Documentary Awards
