= Critics' Choice Super Award for Best Actress in a Science Fiction/Fantasy Movie =

Annual American film award

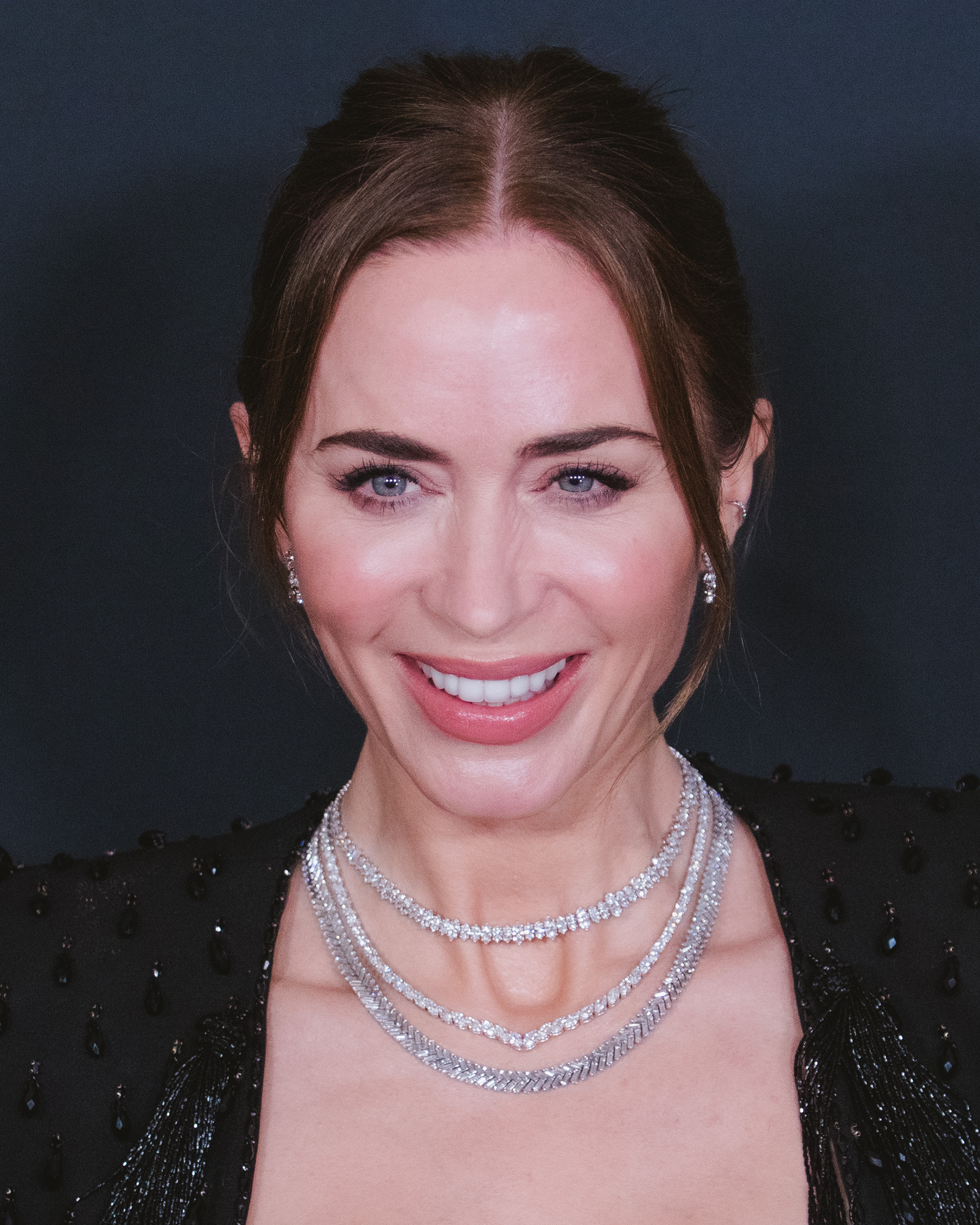
- The 2026 recipient: Emily Blunt
- Country: United States
- Presented by: Critics Choice Association
- First award: 2021
- Currently held by: Emily Blunt, Disclosure Day (2026)

Highlights
- Most nominations: Keke Palmer; Emma Stone; Alicia Vikander; (2)
- Website: http://www.criticschoice.com/

The Critics' Choice Super Award for Best Actress in a Science Fiction/Fantasy Movie is an award presented by the Critics Choice Association to the best performance by an actress in a science fiction or fantasy film.

This award was first presented at the 1st Critics' Choice Super Awards in 2021 to Cristin Milioti for her role as Sarah Wilder in Palm Springs.

The most nominated actresses in this category are Keke Palmer, Emma Stone, and Alicia Vikander with two nominations each.

The current recipient of the award is Emily Blunt for her role as Margaret Fairchild in Disclosure Day.

== Winners and nominees ==
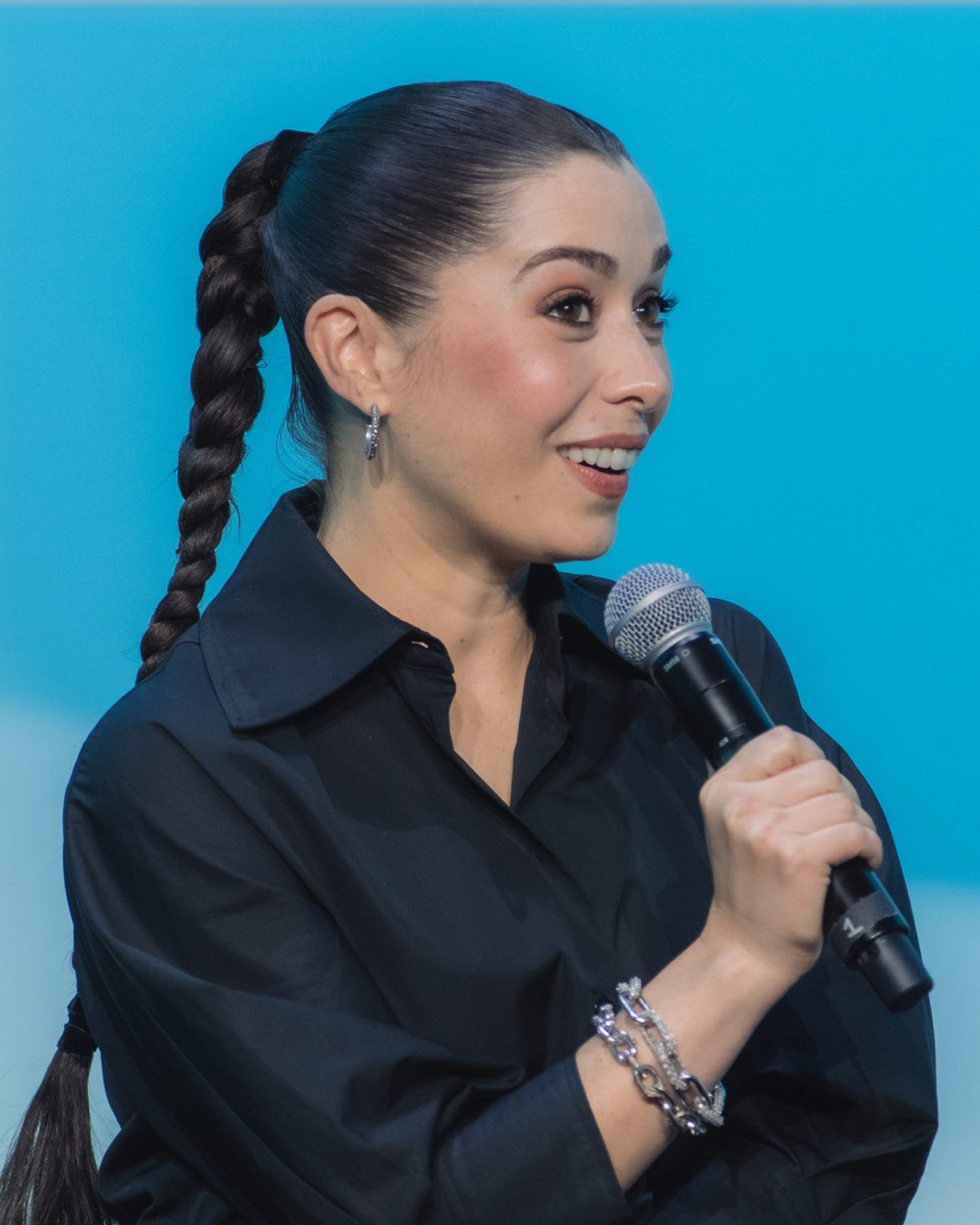
Cristin Milioti won for Palm Springs (2020)

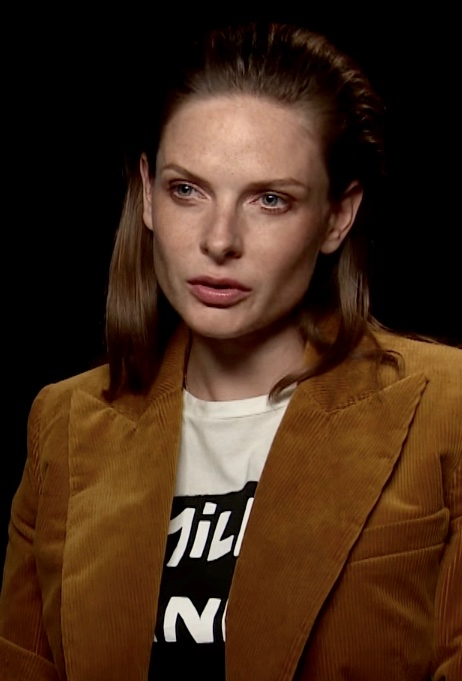
Rebecca Ferguson won for Dune (2021)

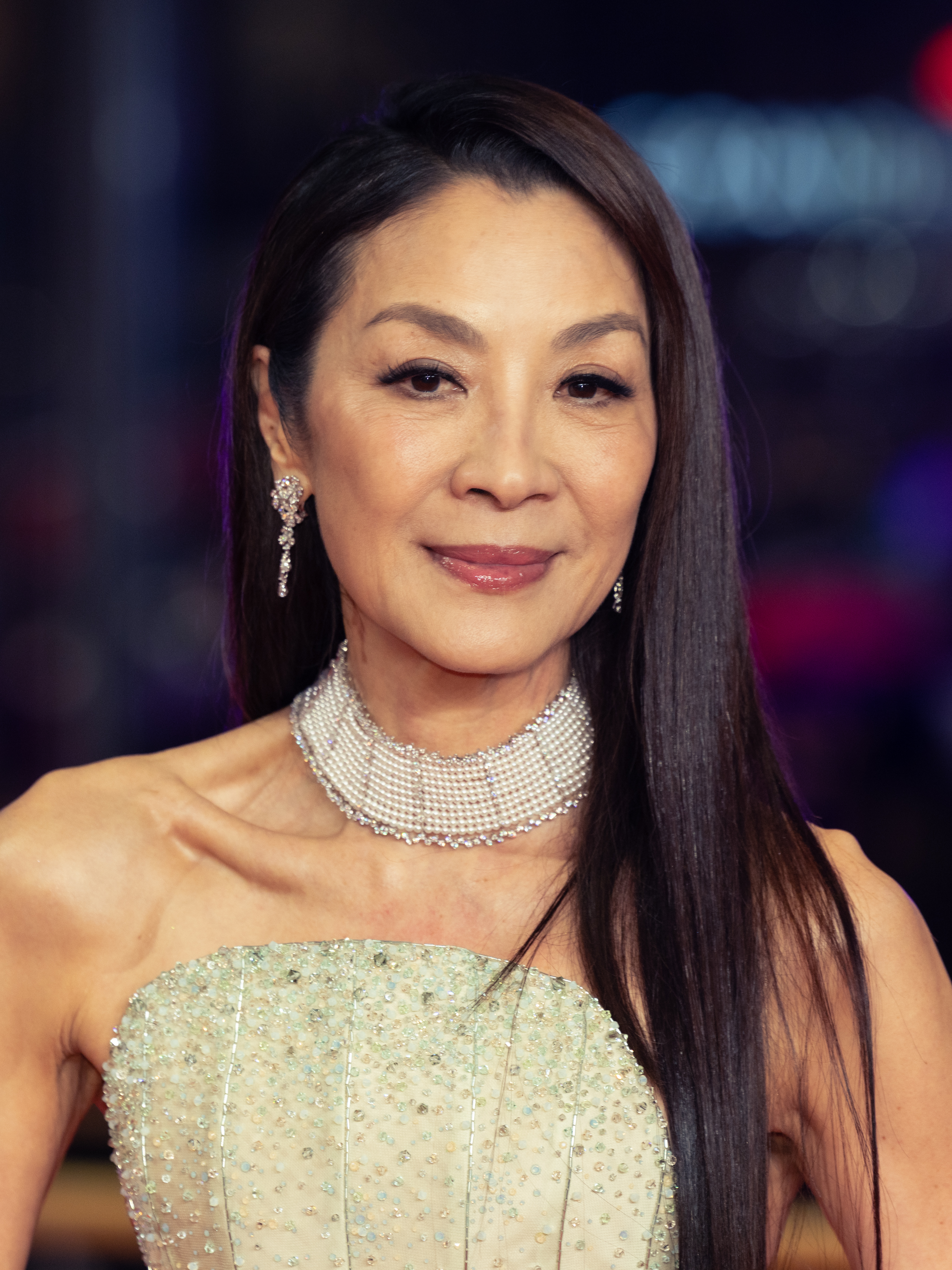
Michelle Yeoh won for Everything Everywhere All at Once (2022)

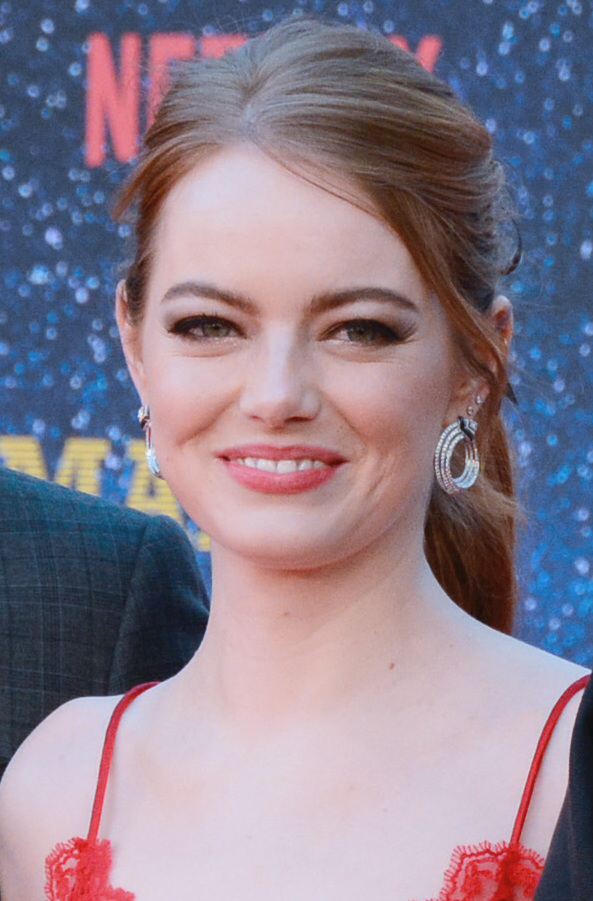
Emma Stone won for Poor Things (2023)

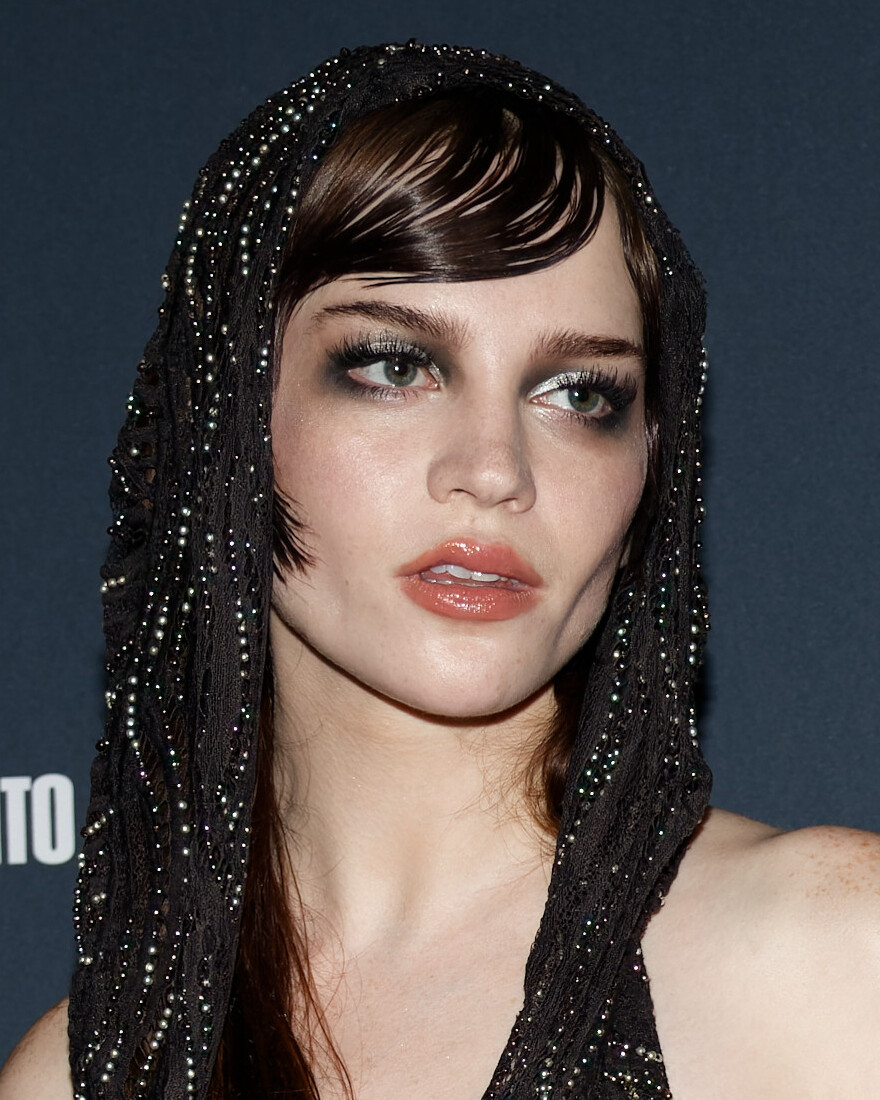
Sophie Thatcher won for Companion (2024)

=== 2020s ===
Year	Actor	Role(s)	Project(s)	Ref.
2021	Cristin Milioti	Sarah Wilder	Palm Springs	
2021	Ally Ioannides	Brianna Dannelly	Synchronic	
2021	Katherine Langford	Mara Carlyle	Spontaneous	
2021	Sierra McCormick	Fay Crocker	The Vast of Night	
2021	Andrea Riseborough	Tasya Vos	Possessor	
2022	Rebecca Ferguson	Lady Jessica	Dune	
2022	Cate Blanchett	Brie Evantree	Don't Look Up	
2022	Jodie Comer	Millie Rusk	Free Guy	
2022	Mckenna Grace	Phoebe Spengler	Ghostbusters: Afterlife	
2022	Jennifer Lawrence	Kate Dibiasky	Don't Look Up	
2022	Alicia Vikander	Essel / The Lady	The Green Knight	
2023	Michelle Yeoh	Evelyn Quan Wang	Everything Everywhere All at Once	
2023	Karen Gillan	Sarah	Dual	
2023	Stephanie Hsu	Joy Wang / Jobu Tupaki	Everything Everywhere All at Once	
2023	Amber Midthunder	Naru	Prey	
2023	Keke Palmer	Emerald "Em" Haywood	Nope	
2023	Zoe Saldaña	Neytiri	Avatar: The Way of Water	
2024	Emma Stone	Bella Baxter	Poor Things	
2024	Olivia Colman	Mrs. Scrubitt	Wonka	
2024	Kaitlyn Dever	Brynn	No One Will Save You	
2024	Minami Hamabe	Noriko Ōishi	Godzilla Minus One	
2024	Madeleine Yuna Voyles	Alpha-O "Alphie"	The Creator	
2025	Sophie Thatcher	Iris	Companion	
2025	Naomi Ackie	Nasha Barridge	Mickey 17	
2025	Lupita Nyong'o	Roz	The Wild Robot	
2025	Cailee Spaeny	Marie Raines "Rain" Carradine	Alien: Romulus	
2025	Alicia Vikander	Virginia	The Assessment	
2025	Zendaya	Chani	Dune: Part Two	
2026	Emily Blunt	Margaret Fairchild	Disclosure Day	
2026	Oona Chaplin	Varang	Avatar: Fire and Ash	
2026	Elle Fanning	Thia / Tessa	Predator: Badlands	
2026	Sandra Hüller	Eva Stratt	Project Hail Mary	
2026	Keke Palmer	Corvette	I Love Boosters	
2026	Emma Stone	Michelle Fuller	Bugonia	

== Performers with multiple nominations ==
2 nominations

- Keke Palmer
- Emma Stone
- Alicia Vikander

== See also ==
- Critics' Choice Super Award for Best Science Fiction/Fantasy Movie
- Critics' Choice Super Award for Best Actor in a Science Fiction/Fantasy Movie
