= Critics' Choice Super Award for Best Actor in a Science Fiction/Fantasy Movie =

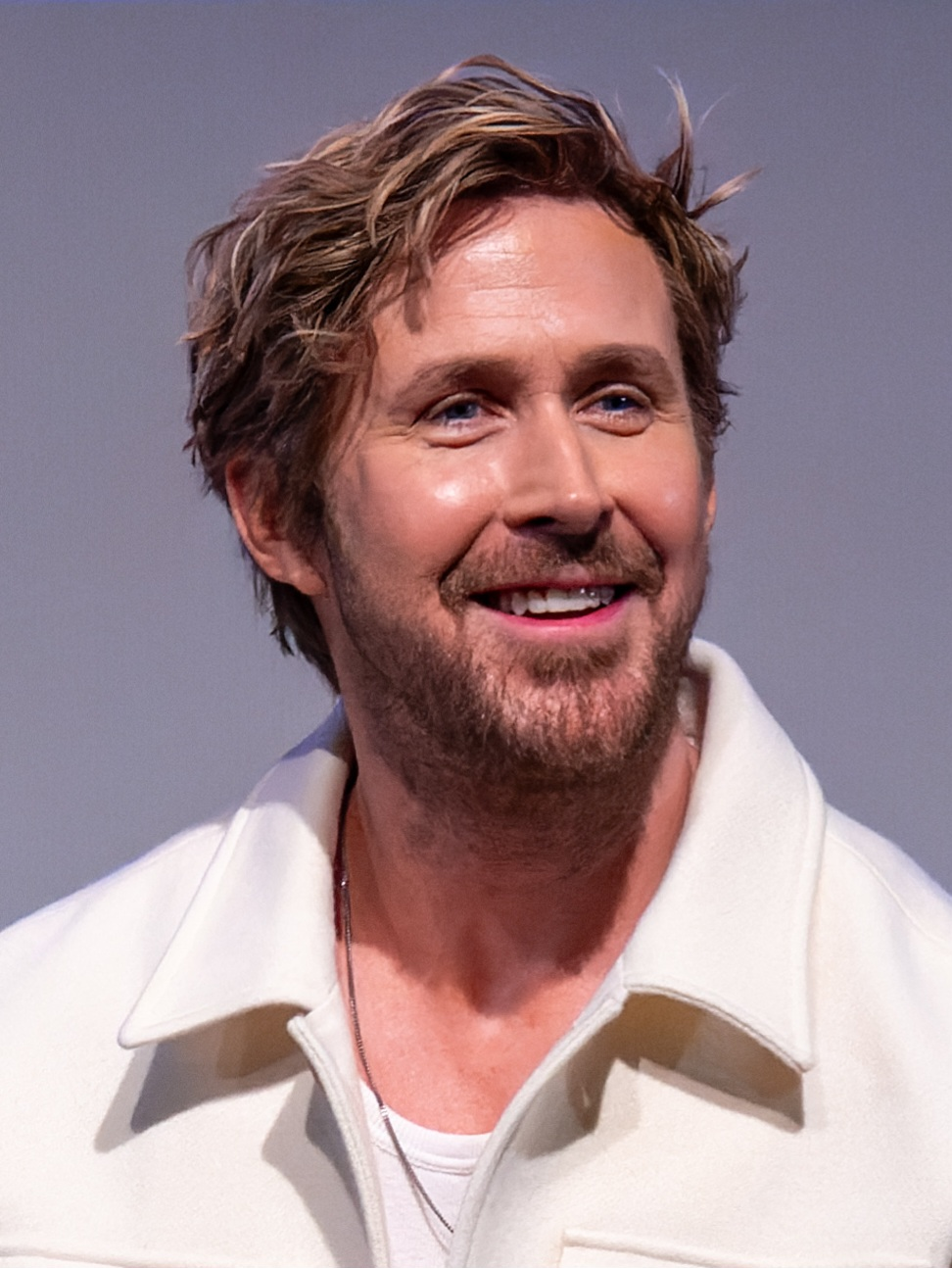
- The 2026 recipient: Ryan Gosling
- Country: United States
- Presented by: Critics Choice Association
- First award: 2021
- Currently held by: Ryan Gosling, Project Hail Mary (2026)

Highlights
- Most nominations: Timothée Chalamet (3)
- Website: http://www.criticschoice.com/

The Critics' Choice Super Award for Best Actor in a Science Fiction/Fantasy Movie is an award presented by the Critics Choice Association to the best performance by an actor in a science fiction or fantasy film.

This award was first presented at the 1st Critics' Choice Super Awards in 2021 to Andy Samberg for his role as Nyles in Palm Springs. The most nominated actor in this category is Timothée Chalamet with 3 nominations.

The current recipient of the award is Ryan Gosling for his role as Ryland Grace in Project Hail Mary.

== Winners and nominees ==
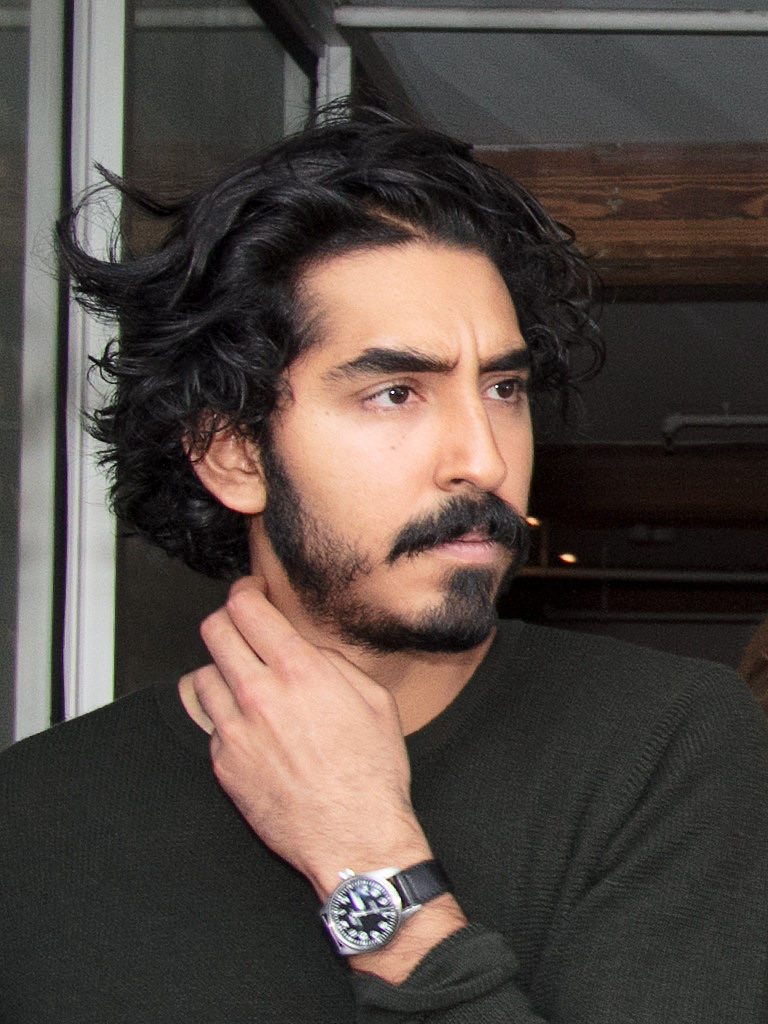
Dev Patel won for The Green Knight (2021)

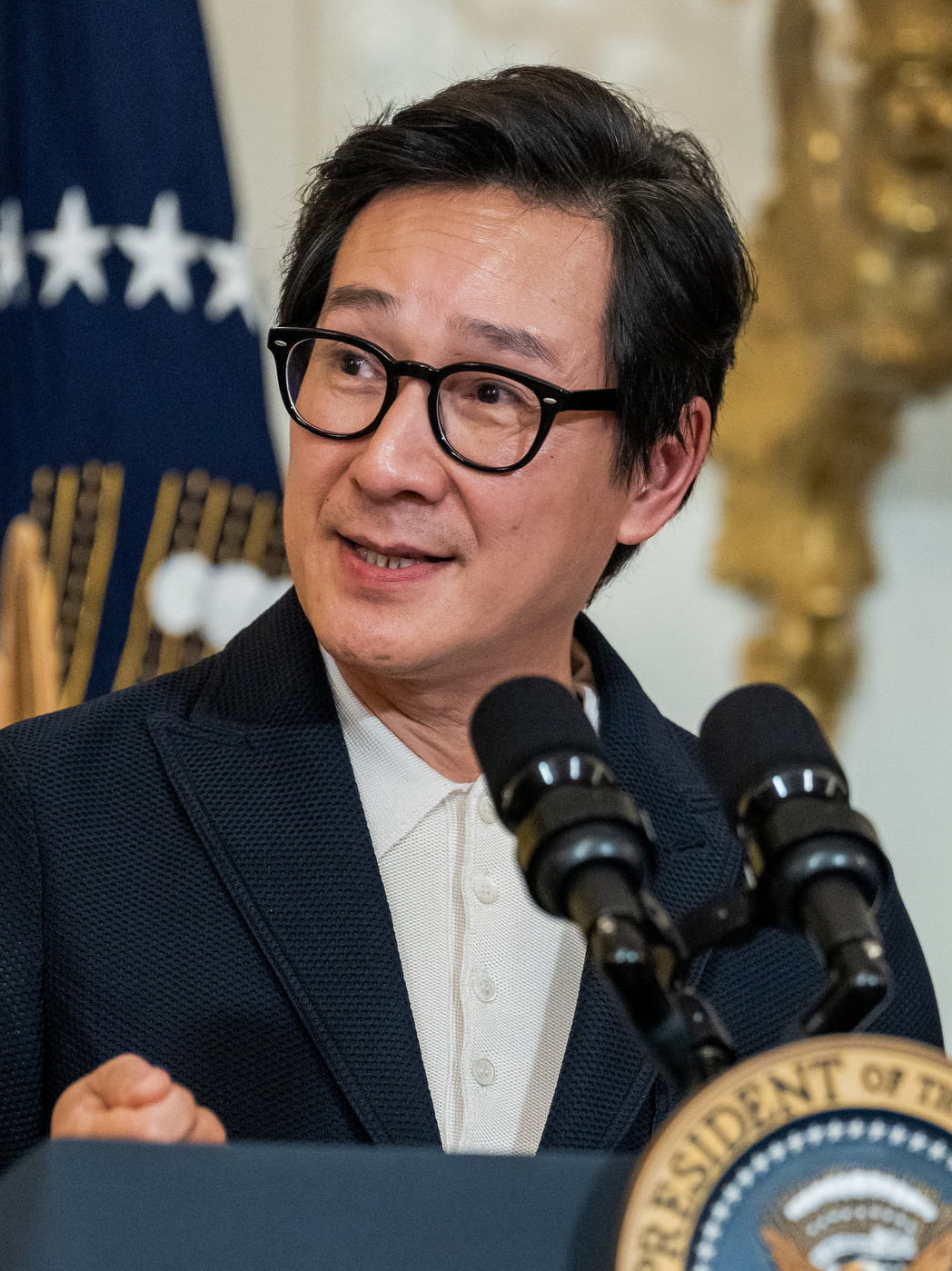
Ke Huy Quan won for Everything Everywhere All at Once (2022)

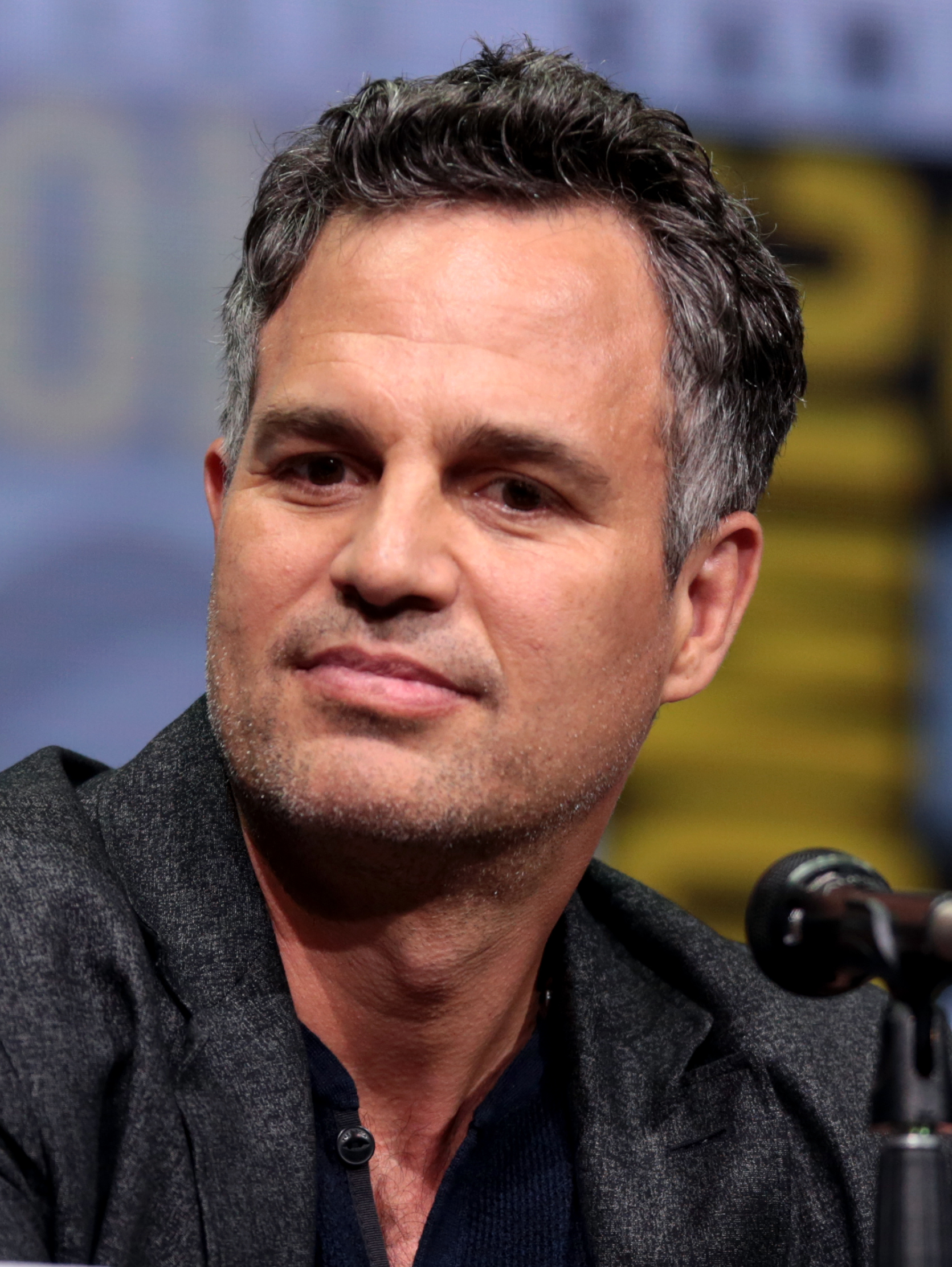
Mark Ruffalo won for Poor Things (2023)

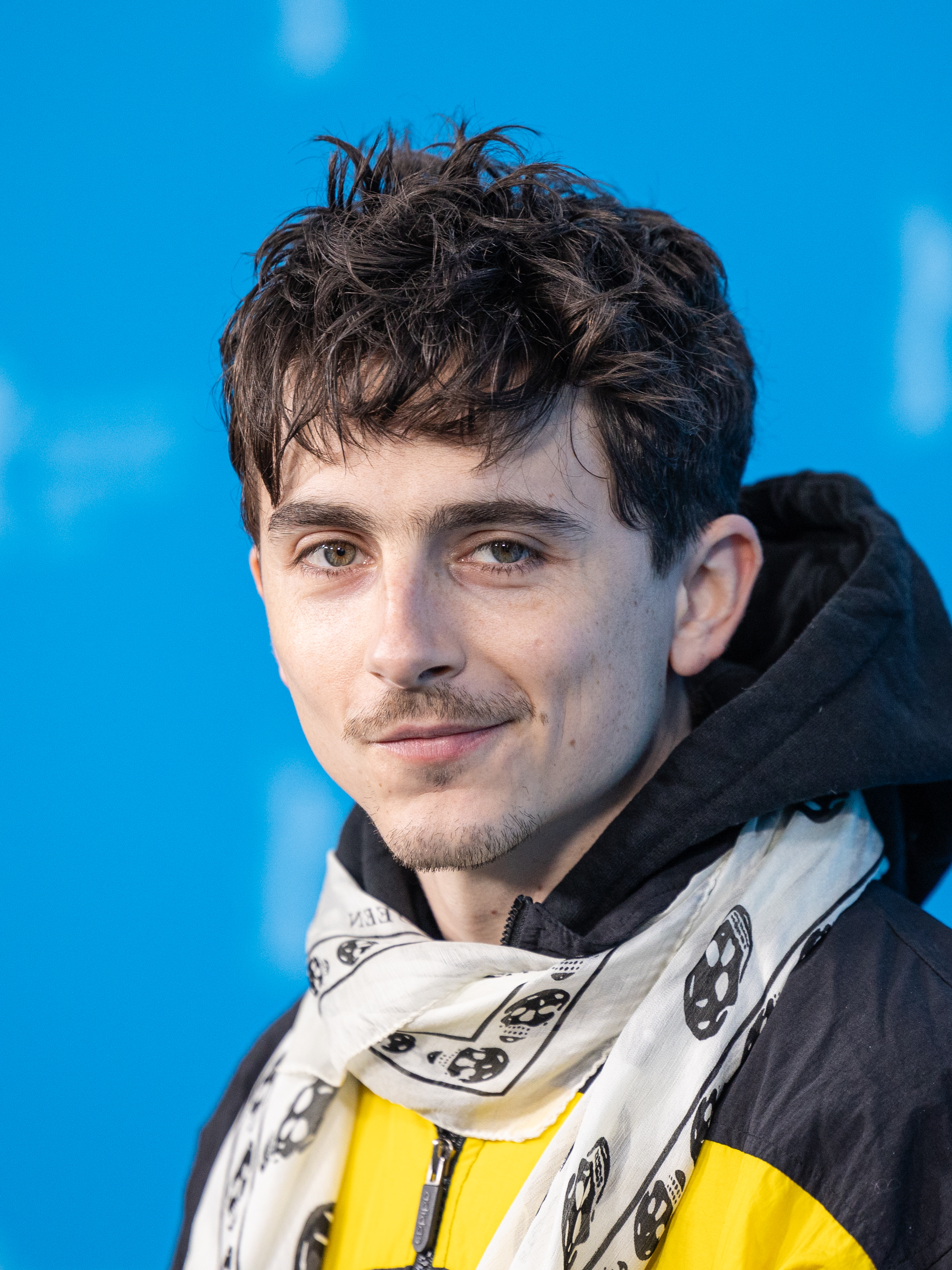
Timothée Chalamet won for Dune: Part Two (2024)

=== 2020s ===
Year	Actor	Role(s)	Project(s)	Ref.
2021	Andy Samberg	Nyles	Palm Springs	
2021	Christopher Abbott	Colin Tate	Possessor	
2021	Jake Horowitz	Everett Sloan	The Vast of Night	
2021	Anthony Mackie	Steve Denube	Synchronic	
2021	J. K. Simmons	Roy Schlieffen	Palm Springs	
2022	Dev Patel	Gawain	The Green Knight	
2022	Mahershala Ali	Cameron Turner	Swan Song	
2022	Timothée Chalamet	Paul Atreides	Dune	
2022	Leonardo DiCaprio	Dr. Randall Mindy	Don't Look Up	
2022	Tom Hanks	Finch	Finch	
2022	Ryan Reynolds	Guy	Free Guy	
2023	Ke Huy Quan	Waymond Wang	Everything Everywhere All at Once	
2023	Colin Farrell	Jake	After Yang	
2023	Daniel Kaluuya	Otis "OJ" Haywood Jr.	Nope	
2023	Ryan Reynolds	Adam Reed	The Adam Project	
2023	Alexander Skarsgård	Amleth	The Northman	
2024	Mark Ruffalo	Duncan Wedderburn	Poor Things	
2024	Timothée Chalamet	Willy Wonka	Wonka	
2024	Willem Dafoe	Dr. Godwin Baxter	Poor Things	
2024	Ryunosuke Kamiki	Kōichi Shikishima	Godzilla Minus One	
2024	Chris Pine	Edgin Darvis	Dungeons & Dragons: Honor Among Thieves	
2025	Timothée Chalamet	Paul Atreides	Dune: Part Two	
2025	Austin Butler	Feyd-Rautha	Dune: Part Two	
2025	David Jonsson	Andy	Alien: Romulus	
2025	Robert Pattinson	Mickey Barnes / Mickey 17 / Mickey 18	Mickey 17	
2025	Jack Quaid	Josh	Companion	
2025	Miles Teller	Levi Kane	The Gorge	
2026	Ryan Gosling	Ryland Grace	Project Hail Mary	
2026	Jacob Elordi	The Creature	Frankenstein	
2026	Matt Johnson	Matt Johnson	Nirvanna the Band the Show the Movie	
2026	James Ortiz	Rocky	Project Hail Mary	
2026	Jesse Plemons	Teddy Gatz	Bugonia	
2026	Sam Rockwell	The Man from the Future	Good Luck, Have Fun, Don't Die	

== Performers with multiple nominations ==
3 nominations

- Timothée Chalamet

2 nominations

- Ryan Reynolds

== See also ==
- Critics' Choice Super Award for Best Science Fiction/Fantasy Movie
- Critics' Choice Super Award for Best Actress in a Science Fiction/Fantasy Movie
