= Critics' Choice Super Award for Best Science Fiction/Fantasy Movie =

- Country: United States
- Presented by: Critics Choice Association
- First award: 2021
- Currently held by: Project Hail Mary (2026)
- Website: criticschoice.com

The Critics' Choice Super Award for Best Science Fiction/Fantasy Movie is an award presented by the Critics Choice Association to the best film in the science fiction or fantasy genres.

== Winners and nominees ==
Year	Film	Director	Ref.
2021	Palm Springs	Max Barbakow	
2021	Love and Monsters	Michael Matthews	
2021	Possessor	Brandon Cronenberg	
2021	Synchronic	Justin Benson and Aaron Moorhead	
2021	The Vast of Night	Andrew Patterson	
2022	Dune	Denis Villeneuve	
2022	Don't Look Up	Adam McKay	
2022	Free Guy	Shawn Levy	
2022	The Green Knight	David Lowery	
2022	The Mitchells vs. the Machines	Mike Rianda and Jeff Rowe	
2022	Swan Song	Benjamin Cleary	
2023	Everything Everywhere All at Once	Daniel Kwan and Daniel Scheinert	
2023	Avatar: The Way of Water	James Cameron	
2023	Nope	Jordan Peele	
2023	The Northman	Robert Eggers	
2023	Prey	Dan Trachtenberg	
2024	Godzilla Minus One	Takashi Yamazaki	
2024	Asteroid City	Wes Anderson	
2024	The Boy and the Heron	Hayao Miyazaki	
2024	The Creator	Gareth Edwards	
2024	Poor Things	Yorgos Lanthimos	
2025	Dune: Part Two	Denis Villeneuve	
2025	Alien: Romulus	Fede Álvarez	
2025	Companion	Drew Hancock	
2025	Kingdom of the Planet of the Apes	Wes Ball	
2025	Mickey 17	Bong Joon Ho	
2025	The Wild Robot	Chris Sanders	
2026	Project Hail Mary	Phil Lord and Christopher Miller	
2026	Bugonia	Yorgos Lanthimos	
2026	Disclosure Day	Steven Spielberg	
2026	Frankenstein	Guillermo del Toro	
2026	Good Luck, Have Fun, Don't Die	Gore Verbinski	
2026	I Love Boosters	Boots Riley	
2026	Predator: Badlands	Dan Trachtenberg	

== Directors with multiple wins ==
2 wins

- Denis Villeneuve

== Directors with multiple nominations ==
2 nominations

- Yorgos Lanthimos
- Dan Trachtenberg
- Denis Villeneuve
