= Aunt Gladys =

- Weapons character
- Amy Madigan as Aunt Gladys
- First appearance: Weapons (2025)
- Created by: Zach Cregger
- Portrayed by: Amy Madigan

In-universe information
- Origin: Weapons (2025)
- Classification: Witch
- Notable powers: Mind control (dream manipulation), blood magic, and supernatural longevity
- Status: Deceased

Aunt Gladys is a fictional character and the main antagonist of the supernatural mystery horror film Weapons (2025). She is set to return as the titular main protagonist of the upcoming prequel film, which is scheduled for a 2028 release. She is introduced as a mysterious woman who claims to be a relative of Alex Lilly's family and later is found to be responsible for the disappearance of seventeen children from Maybrook, Pennsylvania. The character was created by Zach Cregger and portrayed by Amy Madigan.

Gladys appears as an elderly aunt who comes to visit her family, seeming frail and in need of help. She soon reveals herself to be cunning and manipulative. Using witchcraft, she saps the strength of those around her and forces them to obey, working her magic through personal items like hair or clothing even over great distances.

Madigan's performance received widespread recognition during the awards season. She won the Academy Award for Best Supporting Actress at the 98th Academy Awards, along with major industry honors and several critics' prizes, including from the New York Film Critics Circle, Boston Society of Film Critics, and London Film Critics' Circle. She also received nominations from major awards bodies.

== Role ==
Aunt Gladys is introduced as a relative who comes to live with the Lilly family because of her supposed illness. She appears frail and sick at first, but gradually begins taking charge of the household. She proceeds to watch the young, only child, Alex Lilly (Cary Christopher), closely, making sure that he follows her instructions. Gladys uses witchcraft to put those around her under a spell. She handles personal items, like hair and clothing, to reach both the adults in the house and the children she calls to her home. Alex's parents and other adults fall into trance-like states and do as she commands. After performing her ritual at 2:17 am, the children answer her call at the same time and vanish from their homes.

Her influence does not stay inside the house. She manipulates other adults in Maybrook, Pennsylvania, including police officers and neighbors, to protect her plans. Her actions cause seventeen children in the town to go missing. In a flashback, she stays with the Lilly family, feigning illness while secretly growing stronger and plotting her next move. She pressures Alex to assist in her rituals by threatening his parents, forcing him to participate in summoning the children.

Gladys's control continues until a final confrontation, when the children she summoned turn against her. After a chase through the neighborhood, Gladys is ultimately killed by Alex when he reverses the spell to order the frenzied children to tear her apart. The adults and children who were possessed are freed, and her death ends her hold over the household and the town.

== Development ==
=== Conception, characterization, and writing ===
Aunt Gladys was conceived before Weapons began production, based on an earlier script that actor and filmmaker Zach Cregger had set aside. In that story, a mysterious woman takes in a child and takes control of his family—a concept Cregger later adapted for Weapons. He combined this early concept with elements of sympathetic magic and ritualistic practices to create a character that could both control others and remain enigmatic. Following the success of Weapons, Cregger confirmed that a prequel centered on a younger Gladys was in development.

Gladys's exact age is never revealed in the film, but clues suggest she may be far older than she appears. She refers to tuberculosis as "consumption", a term common in the 19th century, suggesting she may have lived for well over a hundred years. Alex's parents say they have not seen her in 15 years. Gladys, however, claims she last saw Alex when he was a baby, which does not align with their timeline. Her power to manipulate memories makes it even harder to determine how old she really is.

The story focuses on her coming to Alex Lilly's home, her strange bonsai, and the rituals she carries out, which leave her victims catatonic as she drains their life force to stay alive. In a Vanity Fair interview, Cregger described Gladys as "the secret weapon of Weapons". She is depicted as cheerful and manipulative.

Gladys controls her victims using hair, personal items, blood, and her thorny tree. An engraved bell is her tool of possession. When Gladys arrives, the story shifts from a simple mystery to a dark, unsettling tale of control and manipulation. Cregger based Gladys's magical abilities on two main influences, The Serpent and the Rainbow, the non-fiction book by anthropologist Wade Davis about voodoo practices in Haiti, rather than the Wes Craven horror film adaptation, and the song "Dancing in the Head" by the British post-punk band the Mekons.

Cregger wrote Gladys to be practical. She abducts the children mainly to sustain herself, using Alex and his parents to carry out tasks while keeping herself hidden. He wrote Gladys as a layered character, using Anton Chigurh from No Country for Old Men (2007) as a reference for her careful imitation of human behavior. Elements like the blackthorn tree, ritual sticks, and an engraved bell were added to give her powers a tangible presence and maintain consistency within the story. Costume designer Trish Summerville, known for her work on The Hunger Games: Catching Fire (2013), styled Gladys to give her what she described as a "deranged grandma" look. Cregger explained that the character's appearance was meant to feel mismatched and out of place, joking that the immortal witch might have picked up her sense of style from elderly retirees while trying to blend into a small town. He said Gladys's outfit looks like an attempt to copy how ordinary people dress, but without really understanding it.

=== Portrayal ===
"I'm more than happy to praise Amy in the press all day. She's incredible in the movie. Without her, it doesn't work. She saved me. It's just hard to talk about her character without giving away spoilers, so it's tricky."

— Statement from director Zach Cregger on Amy Madigan's performance, 2025

Aunt Gladys is portrayed by Amy Madigan. She is depicted as a lipstick-smeared older woman wearing an orange wig and evoking a Pennywise-like presence. She is dressed in bright colors, with slightly uneven makeup, and her hairstyle was chosen after considering numerous wigs to avoid resembling another "scary" film antagonist. Her look includes disheveled "grandma" costumes, patchy hair, and exaggerated makeup.

Madigan's unusual appearance was augmented with withering prosthetics from Autonomous F/X and make-up artist Jason Collins. Madigan's sculpted head was on display, allowing pieces of Gladys's patchy hair and wrinkled face to be applied and tested. Madigan wore a considerable amount of facial prosthetics for the role. Cregger told Entertainment Weekly over Zoom during the home release of Weapons that he recalled discussing Madigan's character look with his head of makeup, Leo Satkovich, and Summerville, saying, "I hope that one day somebody does this on Drag Race." He also credited Madigan with "saving" the film.

Cregger offered Madigan two origin stories: one where Gladys is human using dark magic to survive a life-threatening illness, and another where she is a non-human force imitating human behavior poorly. Madigan called the role "risky but freeing", noting that she could explore the character's bold personality. She also liked the character's look, as Gladys did not have to fit a "contemporary box of what a woman is supposed to look like, of how you’re supposed to dress". Madigan was confronted on Entertainment Weekly's podcast The Awardist with the fan theory that her character might be linked to Elvis Presley's mother Gladys Presley, who reportedly struggled with alcohol—an issue that also appears as a theme in Weapons. Madigan admitted she was surprised by the idea.

== Reception ==
=== Critical response ===
Aunt Gladys received widespread praise, with critics especially noting Amy Madigan's performance. Nick Romano of Entertainment Weekly highlighted the character's strong impact following the film's success and reported that a prequel centered on Gladys was already in development, reflecting continued interest in the character. Writing for Vanity Fair, Anthony Breznican described Madigan's performance as essential to the film, with director Zach Cregger stating that the film "doesn't work" without her and crediting her with elevating the character's presence.

Kofi Outlaw of ComicBook.com praised the depth of Gladys, observing that the multiple possible origin stories made her character compelling and kept audiences debating her true nature. Bill Bria of SlashFilm described Gladys as a strange mix of politeness and eccentricity, yet deeply unsettling, and credited Amy Madigan for bringing those qualities together convincingly. Anubhav Chaudhry of SuperHeroHype wrote that not knowing Gladys's age or what she truly was made her more mysterious and one of the film's most fascinating characters.

Josh Korngut of Dread Central described Madigan's performance as terrifying, not because it relies on shock or grotesque, but because it feels knowing, deliberate, and timeless. He compared her portrayal of Gladys to a character who has stepped out of a dark fairy tale into the real world. Her performance feels grand and deliberate, with a sense of menace that never becomes exaggerated or over-the-top. Collider ranked her performance as the third best horror performance of 2025, with Daniel Boyer writing that Madigan's portrayal of Gladys is one of the year's most remarkable performances, not limited to the horror genre. He described it as a nuanced and complex role, noting that Madigan became unrecognizable in the part and brought to life a fascinating and unique horror villain.

=== Accolades ===
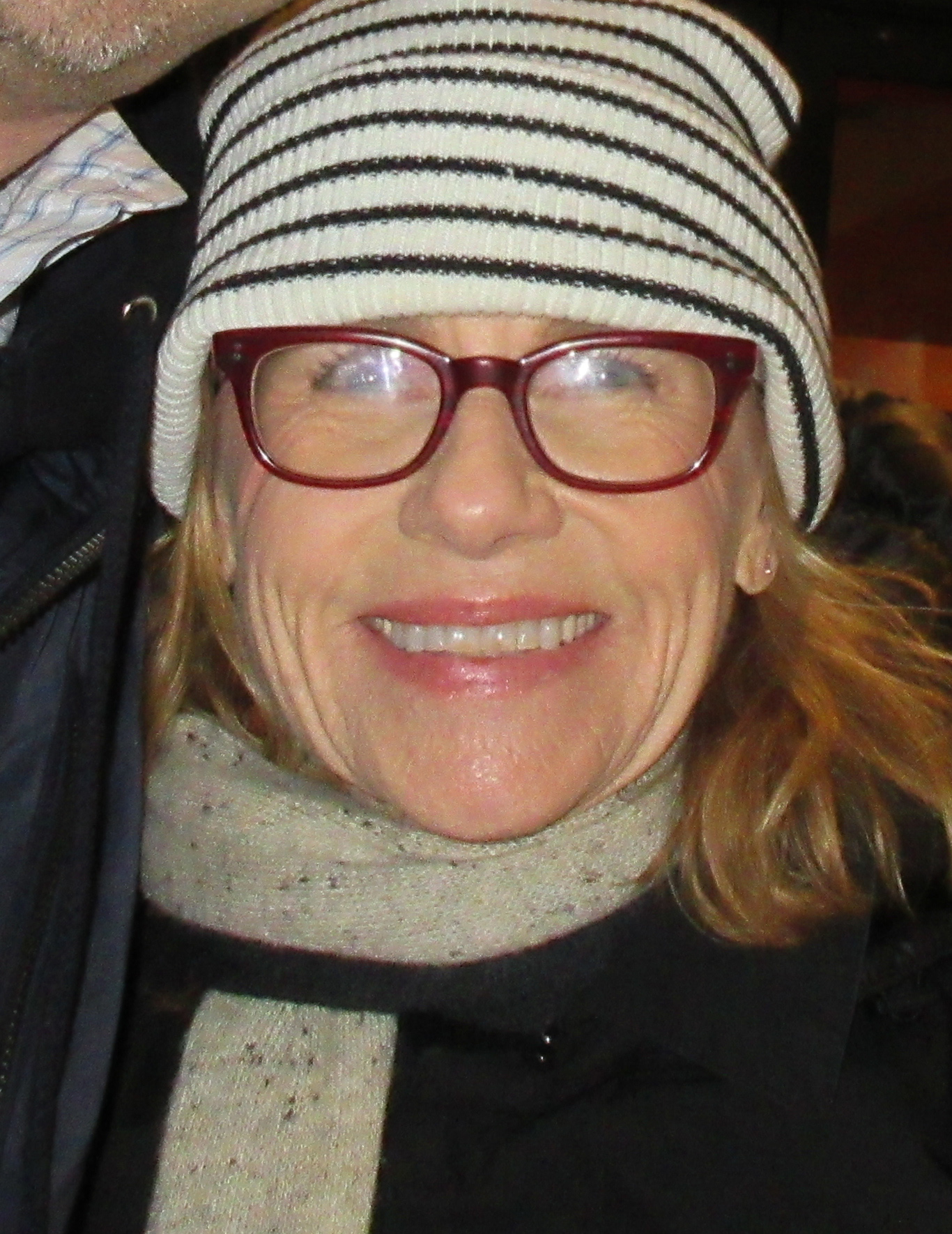
Amy Madigan received acclaim for her performance, winning major awards and earning several nominations.

Amy Madigan's performance in Weapons drew strong notice throughout the awards season, receiving recognition from both major industry bodies and critics' groups. She won the Academy Award for Best Supporting Actress at the 98th Academy Awards, and also received top honors from the Critics' Choice Awards and the Actor Awards. Among critics' organizations, she won supporting actress prizes from groups such as the New York Film Critics Circle, Boston Society of Film Critics, and London Film Critics' Circle. She was also nominated for the Golden Globe Award for Best Supporting Actress – Motion Picture, as well as the Satellite Awards and Saturn Awards. These results included wins from several critics' groups as well as major industry awards. Madigan's is the first horror villain performance to win an Academy Award since Anthony Hopkins for The Silence of the Lambs (1992). Before that, Kathy Bates won Best Actress for Misery (1991). The win also marked the second time that an actress won the Academy Award for Best Supporting Actress for a horror performance, the first of which was Ruth Gordon for her performance as Minnie Castevet in Rosemary's Baby (1968).

=== In popular culture ===
During the 98th Academy Awards where Madigan was nominated for Best Supporting Actress, the opening segment featured a spoof of the ending of Weapons where Conan O'Brien was pursued by children while wearing make-up and a wig to resemble Aunt Gladys. After Madigan won the Oscar, Paramount Pictures issued a poster for the 2026 parody film Scary Movie featuring Ghostface dressed as Aunt Gladys, featuring the tagline, "Aunt You Gladys I'm Back?" The character has gained cultural recognition as a horror villain, inspiring fan art, drag performances, cosplay, and even a custom Monster High doll.
