= Spider-Noir =

2026 American superhero series by Oren Uziel

- Release poster
- Genre: Adventure; Noir; Superhero; Thriller
- Based on: Marvel Comics
- Developed by: Oren Uziel
- Showrunners: Oren Uziel; Steve Lightfoot
- Starring: Nicolas Cage; Lamorne Morris; Li Jun Li; Karen Rodriguez; Abraham Popoola; Jack Huston; Brendan Gleeson
- Music by: Kris Bowers; Michael Dean Parsons
- Opening theme: "Saving Grace" by Kirby
- Country of origin: United States
- Original language: English
- No. of seasons: 1
- No. of episodes: 8

Production
- Executive producers: Pavlina Hatoupis; Harry Bradbeer; Dan Shear; Aditya Sood; Nicolas Cage; Amy Pascal; Phil Lord Christopher Miller; Steve Lightfoot; Oren Uziel
- Producers: Kari Hobson; Annie Court
- Production location: Los Angeles
- Cinematography: Darran Tiernan; Peter Deming
- Editors: Jennifer Barbot; Eric Kissack; Tirsa Hackshaw; Geraud Brisson
- Running time: 42–49 minutes
- Production companies: Pascal Pictures; Lord Miller Productions; Bohemian Risk Productions; Oren; Amazon MGM Studios; Sony Pictures Television

Original release
- Network: MGM+
- Release: May 25, 2026
- Network: Prime Video
- Release: May 27, 2026

Spider-Noir is an American superhero television series developed by Oren Uziel for MGM+ and Prime Video. Based on Marvel Comics featuring the character Spider-Man Noir, the series follows an aging private investigator and superhero in 1930s New York City grappling with his past. Uziel and Steve Lightfoot serve as the series showrunners. Produced by Sony Pictures Television in association with Amazon MGM Studios, Spider-Noir is set in an alternate universe within the Sony's Spider-Man Universe (SSU) franchise.

Nicolas Cage stars as Ben Reilly / The Spider in his first lead role in a television series, with Lamorne Morris, Li Jun Li, Karen Rodriguez, Abraham Popoola, Jack Huston, and Brendan Gleeson also starring. Series development and Uziel's involvement were revealed in February 2023; Lightfoot was hired that December. Cage's casting was confirmed in May 2024, when the series was ordered and titled Noir before it was retitled Spider-Noir that July. Filming took place in Los Angeles from August 2024 to March 2025.

Spider-Noir was released in its entirety on May 25, 2026, on MGM+ in the United States, in color, and consists of eight episodes. The series was later released globally on Prime Video on May 27, in two versions stylized as Authentic Black and White and True-Hue Full Color. It received positive reviews from critics, with Cage's performance receiving particular praise. The series received 11 Primetime Emmy Award nominations, winning five. In September 2026, the series was canceled after one season.

== Premise ==
Ben Reilly, an aging private investigator, grapples with his past life as the only superhero in 1930s New York City, the Spider. When an exceptional case comes his way, Ben must become the Spider once more.

== Cast and characters ==
=== Main ===
- Nicolas Cage as Ben Reilly / The Spider:
  An older, grizzled version of Spider-Man who is a down on his luck private investigator and superhero from an alternate world based on 1930s New York City, who gained his superpowers when serving as a sergeant in World War I. He was bitten by a feral mutated human-spider while liberating soldiers from a German experimentation POW camp, changing his real name to the alias "Ben Reilly" after the war ended. He returns to being the Spider after stepping away from the role five years prior following his fiancée's murder. Executive producers Phil Lord and Christopher Miller described Ben as "older and jaded, and not afraid to punch a guy in the face drunkenly" and someone who "already had his Chinatown disillusionment moment" many years prior, with co-showrunner Oren Uziel saying despite trying to move beyond his past, it keeps returning "to haunt him". Cage approached his performance as "70 percent Humphrey Bogart, and 30 percent Bugs Bunny", believing Ben was "a spider trying to cosplay as a human". He also looked at actors James Cagney and Edward G. Robinson for the performance. Cage was inspired by Bogart's performance in the film The Big Sleep (1946) when Ben goes undercover.
- Lamorne Morris as Joe "Robbie" Robertson:
  Ben's friend and a hard-working freelance journalist who pursues riskier stories to garner attention and progress his career. Uziel said Robbie is optimistic and "thinks he's lucky, and it's all going to work out" with his investigations, compared to Ben who is the opposite and a cynic.
- Li Jun Li as Cat Hardy:
  A femme fatale nightclub singer and love interest to both Ben and Flint Marko, who plots to kill Silvermane. Cat's character was inspired by actresses Anna May Wong, Rita Hayworth, Lauren Bacall, and Kim Basinger.
- Karen Rodriguez as Janet Ruiz:
  Ben's secretary and fellow investigator. Uziel likened Janet to Effie Perine from the film The Maltese Falcon (1941), a character "that can be helpful, that the P.I. can lean on, that can be hard on him, but loves him".
- Abraham Popoola as Lonnie Lincoln / Tombstone: Marko's friend and Silvermane's henchman, who possesses a near-indestructible armored Crocodylia-like skin that grants him superhuman strength and durability.
- Jack Huston as Flint Marko / Sandman: Cat's bodyguard and lover who becomes Silvermane's henchman and has the ability to transform his own body into sand.
- Brendan Gleeson as Finbar "Finn" Byrne / Silvermane: An Irish mob boss with connections to Ben's past who has been the target of multiple assassination attempts. Gleeson described the character as a philosopher with "a drone-eye view" who is equally dangerous.

=== Recurring ===
- Amanda Schull as Ruby J. Williams: Ben's deceased fiancée who was killed by a criminal Ben caught, prompting him to retire the Spider identity
- Lukas Haas as Winston: Silvermane's right-hand man
- Cary Christopher as Frankie: A young newsboy Ben and Janet take care of who also helps in their cases
- Jack Mikesell as James "Jimmy" Addison: A criminal with pyrokinesis abilities
- Cameron Britton as Patrick Donegal: A PI who briefly met Ben
- Michael Kostroff as Alfred Morris: The incumbent Mayor of New York City running for reelection while having to contend with Silvermane
- Scott MacArthur as Perry: One of Silvermane's henchmen
- Joe Massingill as Pudge: One of Silvermane's henchmen
- Richard Robichaux as Howard Walters: The editor of the Daily Bugle
- Whitney Rice as Vera Addison: Jimmy's widow who used his money for her lavish lifestyle
- Andrew Lewis Caldwell as Dirk Leyden / Megawatt: A criminal with the ability to absorb and release electricity
- Amy Aquino as Dr. Alethea Faber: A doctor trying to find a cure for the metahumans
- Andrew Robinson as Ogden Faber: Dr. Faber's secretary, later revealed to be her son who rapidly aged from the experiments that created the other superpowered.
  - Kai Caster portrays a young Ogden.

== Episodes ==
No.	Title	Directed by	Written by	MGM+ release date	Prime Video release date
1	"Step Into My Office"	Harry Bradbeer	Oren Uziel	May 25, 2026	May 27, 2026
In the 1920s, private investigator Ben Reilly once operated as the vigilante "the Spider" but retired after his fiancée Ruby Williams died. In 1933, Ben and another PI, Donegal, are hired by a man named Winston to find criminal Jimmy Addison. Donegal kills Addison after the latter tries to attack him when cornered, revealing himself to have pyrokinesis in the process. Ben is later hired to investigate nightclub singer Cat Hardy, the younger wife of a man named Carmedy, for infidelity. At the Redcliff, Ben discreetly stops Cat's supposed lover from assaulting her. He and Donegal then learn that Winston is the right-hand man for crime boss Silvermane, whom Donegal plans to exploit. Ben and his secretary, Janet, also discover that Cat's companion is Mayor Alfred Morris, so they drop the case. After learning the police recovered Addison's body, Ben goes to the Alcove nightclub to blackmail Cat and warn Donegal about Silvermane. Silvermane tortures and kills Donegal, while Cat sends her bodyguard Flint Marko, who is able to turn his body into sand, after Ben. Ben abandons the blackmail after Cat breaks up the fight. The next day, Cat hires him to investigate Marko's disappearance.
2	"Tread Lightly"	Harry Bradbeer	Christopher Chen	May 25, 2026	May 27, 2026
Despite suspecting Cat is hiding information, Ben accepts the case and searches Marko's apartment, discovering that Marko and Addison were former World War I soldiers who once worked as enforcers for Silvermane. Cat admits Silvermane owns the Alcove and says she has personal reasons for searching for Marko. Silvermane's men later capture Ben, but he manages to escape. Ben's journalist friend Robbie Robertson interviews Addison's widow and learns she has been spending the money Addison earned from burning down Silvermane's mansion on a luxurious lifestyle. Meanwhile, Marko's condition worsens, forcing him to hide with his friend Lonnie Lincoln, who has superhuman strength and unbreakable skin. After Silvermane's men threaten Janet, Ben becomes the Spider again. During an alcohol shipment, the Spider defeats Silvermane's henchmen and intimidates him into leaving Ben and Janet alone. Later, Robbie tells Ben that by confronting Silvermane, he unintentionally saved his life because the police had planned an ambush at the docks.
3	"Double Cross"	Nzingha Stewart	Megan Liao & Steve Lightfoot	May 25, 2026	May 27, 2026
Ben is hired by Silvermane to find who leaked his liquor transfer. At the hospital, he learns injured officers were tipped off by Morris. Robbie goes to a Hooverville establishment to question Lincoln but witnesses a raid ordered by Morris, forcing Marko and Lincoln to use their powers against the cops. Janet discovers Addison, Lincoln, and Marko were former prisoners of war. Ben also finds out Carmedy lied about being Cat's husband to gather evidence on Morris and that Cat arranged the meeting. He concludes Cat leaked the transfer and hired Addison to burn down Silvermane's mansion. Ben breaks into Silvermane's vault to pay Vera to leave town before she exposes Cat. Marko briefly considers escaping with Cat, but abandons the idea due to his unstable condition. Ben later confronts Cat at Penn Station as she tries to flee, but Winston captures them. After tracing marked bill payments from Silvermane, Ben frames Winston by using his money to pay Vera. Silvermane shoots and kills Winston.
4	"A Mistake I'll Never Make Again"	Nzingha Stewart	Tori Sampson	May 25, 2026	May 27, 2026
Silvermane also shoots his underling Gio. Cat reveals to Ben she hired Addison to kill Silvermane so she could settle down with Marko after Silvermane murdered her first fiancé. Marko eavesdrops on their discussion. Feeling betrayed, he decides to work for Silvermane again. Robbie and Janet interview Lincoln at the office. Silvermane uses Marko to intimidate Morris into backing off on his campaign ending Prohibition while annoyed that the police chief MacNamara missed their appointment. Ben and Cat spend the night at his place, where he divulges on how Ruby died from a criminal he caught seeking revenge. They both leave after hearing a metahuman is attacking the Diamond District, presuming it to be Marko. The metahuman is a man named Dirk Leyden, a criminal with the ability to absorb and release electricity. The Spider defeats him by shutting off the power in the area to prevent Leyden from storing any more electricity, and Morris uses his victory to boost his campaign. Cat returns to Ben's apartment and deduces that he is the Spider before kissing him.
5	"Betrayal"	Alethea Jones	Jennifer Frazin & Steve Lightfoot	May 25, 2026	May 27, 2026
Ben reveals to Cat he got his powers fifteen years earlier during the final days of World War I. After discovering German experiments on POWs he was liberating, he was bitten by a mutated half-spider prisoner. Robbie regains his job at the Daily Bugle using the story about the Spider and Leyden's battle. He and Janet discover every metahuman had seen Dr. Faber before developing powers. While Robbie interrogates Faber and her secretary Ogden, Ben steals medical files proving Faber tried to cure the metahumans but instead aggravated their conditions, and that they will die if they keep using their powers. Marko, now Silvermane's right-hand man, recruits Lincoln and frees Leyden to join them. Silvermane warns Ben to keep the Spider out of his conflict with Morris. Ben asks Cat to leave the city with him and she agrees, but Marko later confronts her over hiring Addison without telling him. Lincoln informs Cat that Faber believes seeing the Spider could help her find a cure, leading Cat to reveal Ben's secret to Faber and Ogden.
6	"Nightmare on a Gurney"	Alethea Jones	Jack Henderson	May 25, 2026	May 27, 2026
Ogden comes to Ben's apartment and discloses he served in the war as well, but his mutation has rapidly aged him. When Ben refuses to cooperate, he drugs him to forcibly bring him to Faber's lab. Faber reveals that Ogden is her son and she's determined to find a cure for the metahumans to help him, then examines Ben's organs. During her operation, Ben has nightmares about the procedures and changes he endured after the spider bite. Faber is able to develop a cure and restores Ogden to his true age. She plans to kill Ben so they can cover their tracks, but Ogden allows him to escape to repay his services. Silvermane and his men invade the facility to find more metahumans to join their ranks. After seeing other mutated soldiers that Faber failed to save and getting shot at by Ogden, Leyden kills Faber and Ogden. As the resulting fire blows up the lab, Ben leaves with the cure in his possession.
7	"Nobody's Hero"	Greg Yaitanes	Bruce Marshall Romans	May 25, 2026	May 27, 2026
Silvermane has Leyden and Marko attack Morris' campaign office and steal his money as McNamara tells Morris to contact the Spider. Ben drowns his sorrows over Cat's betrayal in alcohol at a bar and beats up a group of naysayers. After some encouragement from Robbie to help the other metahumans, Ben prepares doses of the antidote to cure all of them and plans to use it on himself afterwards. As the Spider struggles against Lincoln and the corrupt police officers due to previously overusing his webbing at the bar fight, Robbie manages to inject the cure in Lincoln through his eye and the two help him evade the police officers. While Ben recovers from the fight, Lincoln thanks the two for helping him, encourages Robbie to find another way to report outside of the Daily Bugle, and leaves the city with his mother. Both Silvermane and Morris find out what happened to Tombstone. They each give orders to bring Ben to them.
8	"The Man in the Mask"	Greg Yaitanes	Oren Uziel	May 25, 2026	May 27, 2026
Cat tells Janet to ask Ben for the antidote to cure Marko and Leyden, but they follow Janet to Robbie's place and capture Ben. Silvermane forces Ben to contact the Spider, with Robbie posing as him, and orders the antidote brought to the Alcove. After Leyden recognizes Ben from the war, Silvermane realizes Ben is the Spider and threatens Cat to make him confess. To protect Ben, Cat reveals she betrayed Silvermane. Before Silvermane can kill her, Robbie arrives dressed as the Spider. Leyden injects Robbie with the cure and electrocutes him, then tries to persuade Marko to help overthrow Silvermane. Ben regains use of his webbing and fights Leyden and Marko while Cat tracks down and kills Silvermane. Marko turns on Leyden after he attacks Cat. The Spider kills Leyden by throwing him into an incoming train. He gives the last antidote dose to Marko, sacrificing his only chance to become human again so Cat and Marko can be together. Later, Morris wins reelection, Robbie leaves the Daily Bugle to lead the Harlem Herald, and Ben and Janet renovate their office, now called "Reilly and Ruiz Investigations".

== Production ==
=== Development ===
Sony Pictures Entertainment chairman Tony Vinciquerra stated in March 2019 that Sony's shared universe of Spider-Man–related properties, known as Sony's Spider-Man Universe (SSU), would be expanding to television with a set of Marvel Comics projects developed by Sony Pictures Television. The studio was "essentially internally auditioning" characters from the 900 it could access to decide which medium they would appear in. After their work on Sony's animated film Spider-Man: Into the Spider-Verse (2018), Phil Lord and Christopher Miller signed their production company Lord Miller Productions to an overall deal with Sony Pictures Television in April 2019 to develop multiple television series for the studio, including their Marvel-based series, which could potentially include characters from Into the Spider-Verse as well as live-action properties. Select projects would be produced in conjunction with Amy Pascal, a frequent producer of the Spider-Man films, with the intention for Lord and Miller to reboot the Spider-Man property for television. By September 2020, Sony was in talks with Prime Video for the latter to be the streaming distributor for Sony's "suite" of Marvel-based television series.

Sony Pictures Television was revealed in February 2023 to be developing a television series based on the Spider-Man Noir character for MGM+ and Prime Video via Amazon MGM Studios. This version of the character is from a different universe than the one seen in the Spider-Verse animated films. Miller believed a series based on the character was "the biggest no-brainer of all time". Oren Uziel, a close friend of Lord and Miller's who was a fan of film noir, was writing for the series and developing it with fellow executive producers Lord, Miller, and Pascal through their production companies Lord Miller Productions and Pascal Pictures. Miller said Uziel had a "perfect" take on approaching the series. In December, Amazon hired Steve Lightfoot, who was the showrunner of the Marvel Television series The Punisher (2017–2019), to serve as co-showrunner and an executive producer alongside Uziel; the two are credited as the series' developers along with Lord, Miller, and Pascal.

Amazon announced at its upfronts presentation in May 2024 that the series had been ordered and titled Noir, and that Harry Bradbeer had joined as an executive producer and would direct the first two episodes. Nzingha Stewart served as another director. Additional executive producers are Aditya Sood and Dan Shear of Lord Miller, star Nicolas Cage, and Pavlina Hatoupis. In July, the series was retitled Spider-Noir to better highlight its connections to the Spider-Man universe, and was revealed to consist of eight 45-minute long episodes. Lesley Goldberg at Puck reported in August 2024 that Sony was not expected to renew its overall deal with Lord and Miller after the duo disagreed with the studio on the series' budget. By the end of 2024, Sony was reported to no longer be developing further films for its franchise at that time and was instead focusing on other projects, such as Spider-Noir.

In April 2026, Uziel was excited to potentially explore World War II as a setting for a possible second season as well as moving the series to a different setting, adding that centering the series around a private detective, "all it takes is a knock on the office door and a new client walks in… I really feel like this is a great jumping-off point to expand your story." In September 2026, the series was cancelled after one season. Following the series' cancellation, Uziel reiterated his thoughts about telling a story in another season around World War II and said new locations could have included Los Angeles or Europe, which would have allowed the creatives to reference the various noirs from those locations.

=== Writing ===
Christopher Chen, Megan Liao, Tori Sampson, Jennifer Frazin, Jack Henderson, and Bruce Marshall Romans served as writers on the series, alongside Uziel and Lightfoot; Romans previously worked with Lightfoot on The Punisher. Miller said in May 2023 that development, along with the writers' room, was put on hold because of the 2023 Writers Guild of America strike that began earlier that month, and that work would resume after the strike concluded; the writers' strike ended in late September 2023.

Spider-Noir is set in an alternate world based on 1930s New York City, with Sony Pictures Television president Katherine Pope describing the series as a reimagining of the Spider-Man Noir character in the SSU. Upon the reveal of the series' development, Variety reported that it would be set in its own universe and that the series would focus on a different main character rather than Peter Parker, who is the identity of Spider-Man Noir in the comics. The main character is known as Ben Reilly, the name of a separate character in the comics who is a clone of Peter Parker and becomes the Scarlet Spider. The Reilly in Spider-Noir is not known as "Spider-Noir", but rather "The Spider" as a way to harken back to some of the early crimefighters in comics such as the Spirit and the Shadow. Uziel said one of the reasons for changing the name of the character from Parker to Reilly was to better fit with the series' noir tone, saying that "Peter Parker feels very synonymous with a high school kid. Boyish." Lord and Miller also said there were additional narrative reasons for changing the name that would be addressed in the series, while Cage said Spider-Noir would explain why Reilly "talks the way he talks" beyond "just mashing the flavors of 1930s film performance and Marvel iconography". Deadline Hollywood reported the name was changed because of the character's television rights.

=== Casting ===
Spider-Noir marks actor Nicolas Cage's first lead role in a television series.

Lord and Miller said in May 2023 that there was potential for Nicolas Cage to portray Spider-Man Noir in the series after he previously voiced a version of the character in Spider-Man: Into the Spider-Verse. Cage was in talks for the role by February 2024, and was confirmed to star by May as Ben Reilly / The Spider. In July 2024, several actors were cast in the series, including Lamorne Morris as Robbie Robertson, Brendan Gleeson as Silvermane, Li Jun Li as Cat Hardy, and Abraham Popoola. Gleeson's casting was confirmed in September, when Jack Huston and Karen Rodriguez joined the cast as series regulars as Flint Marko / Sandman and Janet, respectively. Also that month, Lukas Haas, Cameron Britton, Cary Christopher, Michael Kostroff, Scott MacArthur, Joe Massingill, Whitney Rice, and Amanda Schull were all cast in undisclosed recurring roles. Andrew Lewis Caldwell was cast to recur in the series in November, followed by Amy Aquino and Andrew Robinson joining in February 2025, and the next month, Kai Caster had joined for a guest role, which was said to be connected to another character in the series.

=== Design ===
Trayce Field served as the costume designer, after previously designing the Prowler super suit worn by Donald Glover for a live-action sequence in the animated film Spider-Man: Across the Spider-Verse (2023), while Warren Alan Young was the production designer, after working on the Marvel Television series Runaways (2017–2019).

=== Filming ===
Principal photography had begun by August 2024 in Los Angeles, using the working title Old Fashioned, with Darran Tiernan serving as the cinematographer. Gleeson had begun filming some of his scenes by the start of October. Filming was temporarily suspended due to the January 2025 Southern California wildfires, and it was initially scheduled to last until February 2025; filming had concluded by mid-March. The production used black-and-white cameras and filters during filming to capture the authentic style of early 1930s noir films, such as featuring long shadows.

Cage refused to sign a waiver to allow artificial intelligence to be used for the series as he stated he was "not an AI-friendly actor".

=== Post-production ===
Tirsa Hackshaw, Eric Kissack, and Jennifer Barbot serve as the series' editors; Hacksaw previously worked with Lightfoot on The Punisher.

The series was created for release in both black-and-white and color. To achieve the two versions, on-set footage was captured digitally to then be split and processed separately. The team coined the term "True-Hue" to refer to how they went about creating their Technicolor-like color version, with Cage saying that version was made to look "super saturated" and Uziel noting it was as if the black and white film had been colorized. Cage likened the style of the color version to the painting Nighthawks (1942) by Edward Hopper. Anthony Breznican at Esquire felt each version resulted in different vibes for the series, "with the color version veering more toward the lighthearted comic-strip crime capers of Dick Tracy, while the black and white conjures the sinister moral abyss of the novels of Raymond Chandler".

=== Music ===
Kris Bowers and Michael Dean Parsons were revealed in February 2026 to be composing the series' score. On May 7, 2026, the series' lead single "Saving Grace", written by Oak Felder and Sebastian Kole and performed by Kirby, was released from Milan Records. A soundtrack album, including Bowers and Parsons's score, was released on May 27, 2026.

Spider-Noir (Original Soundtrack)
No.	Title	Length
1.	"Saving Grace" (featuring Kirby)	2:47
2.	"The Only Universe"	2:43
3.	"I Need a Drink"	1:17
4.	"Tail in a White Suit"	2:19
5.	"Sand Hands"	1:15
6.	"Cat Hardy"	1:24
7.	"Dream a Little Dream of Me" (featuring Li Jun Li)	3:05
8.	"Black vs. Silver"	2:08
9.	"Silvermane"	2:19
10.	"The Why Guys"	1:51
11.	"Robbie Robertson"	0:40
12.	"Kiss Me for Coming Back"	1:32
13.	"Prison Break"	2:06
14.	"Card Game"	0:57
15.	"Her Name Was Ruby"	1:38
16.	"Existential Toilet"	1:14
17.	"The Devils You Know" (featuring Li Jun Li)	2:29
18.	"In the Beginning"	2:28
19.	"Dr. Faber"	1:21
20.	"Santorini"	1:32
21.	"Secret Lab"	1:00
22.	"What's Happening to Me, Sir?"	1:41
23.	"They Called Me Freckles"	1:11
24.	"I Like Ravioli"	3:30
25.	"Super Cells"	1:05
26.	"Transformation"	1:09
27.	"Sedated Escape"	1:05
28.	"Power and Responsibility"	2:31
29.	"You Loved Me at My Worst"	3:13
30.	"What You're Worth"	1:20
31.	"Behind the Mask"	2:53
32.	"Say Goodbye"	3:19
33.	"Final Act"	2:33
34.	"The Spider"	0:29
Total length:		58:44

==== Charts ====
Chart performance for Spider-Noir (Prime Original Series Soundtrack)
Chart (2026)	Peak position
UK Soundtrack Albums (Official Charts)	41

== Marketing ==
During Amazon's upfronts presentation in May 2025, a promotional first-look picture of Cage in costume as Spider-Man Noir was unveiled. Jordan Moreau of Variety described the costume as "iconic" and stylistically similar to the version worn by the character in the animated Spider-Verse films. Rosy Cordero at Deadline Hollywood described the teaser as "moody". The first trailer was released on February 12, 2026, in both black-and-white and color. It featured the tagline "With no power, comes no responsibility", a "cheeky riff" on the phrase "With great power comes great responsibility" associated with Spider-Man. In late April 2026, Marvel Comics announced a tie-in comic book, Spider-Noir #1, in collaboration with Sony Pictures Television and Amazon MGM Studios that would serve as a prelude to the series. It was written by Marc Guggenheim from a story by Jay Martin, with art by Stefano Raffaele, and cover art by Mike Hawthorne. The comic was available at various Spider-Noir-related activations and events leading up to the series' premiere, such as CCXP Mexico, and released in black-and-white and color versions like the series, with the colored version being colored by Larry Molinar. Alamo Drafthouse Cinema created a curated four-week film series called "Web of Shadows: Films That Inspired Spider-Noir", featuring the noir films In a Lonely Place (1950), Sweet Smell of Success (1957), The Third Man (1949), and Kiss Me Deadly (1955). Additionally, the first two episodes were screened at select Alamo Drafthouse theaters on May 25, with stars Morris and Huston participating in a post-screening Q&A session at Alamo Drafthouse's Los Angeles location.

== Release ==
The Spider, as seen in the "Authentic Black and White" release (top) and the "True-Hue Full Color" release (bottom).

Spider-Noir was released in its entirety in the United States on MGM+ on May 25, 2026. The series consists of eight episodes, and was released globally, including in the United States, on May 27 on Prime Video. Spider-Noir was released in both a black-and-white and a fully colored version, marketed as "Authentic Black & White" and "True-Hue Full Color", respectively. Cage hoped the dual release would inspire audiences to become interested in early black and white noir films to gain an appreciation of them as an art form. The series had its world premiere at the Regal Times Square in New York City, on May 13, 2026.

== Reception ==
=== Viewership ===
Nielsen Media Research, which records streaming viewership on certain U.S. television screens, reported that Spider-Noir generated 851 million minutes viewed during the week of May 25–31, ranking as the second most-streamed original series of the week. The following week, from June 1–7, the series accumulated 739 million minutes of watch time, placing fourth among original series. Between June 8–14, Spider-Noir generated an additional 410 million minutes viewed, ranking as the eighth most-streamed original series for the week. Overall, Spider-Noir accumulated 2.6 billion minutes of watch time during its first six weeks, according to Nielsen Media Research.

=== Critical response ===
On the review aggregator website Rotten Tomatoes, 92% of 111 critics' reviews are positive, with an average rating of 7.6/10. The website's consensus reads: "Nicolas Cage delivers a gloriously pulpy performance that makes every quip and thwip crackle in Spider-Noir—a dazzling, stylish blend of hard-boiled storytelling and pure comic book verve." Metacritic, which uses a weighted average, assigned the series a score of 72 out of 100, based on 28 critics, indicating "generally favorable" reviews.

=== Accolades ===
Award	Date of Ceremony	Category	Nominee(s)	Result	Ref.
Black Reel TV Awards	August 17, 2026	Outstanding Supporting Actor, Comedy Series	Lamorne Morris	Nominated	
Critics' Choice Super Awards	August 6, 2026	Best Superhero Series	Spider-Noir	Won (Note: Tied with The Boys)	
Critics' Choice Super Awards	August 6, 2026	Best Actor in a Superhero Series	Nicolas Cage	Nominated	
Critics' Choice Super Awards	August 6, 2026	Best Villain in a Series	Brendan Gleeson	Nominated	
MacGuffin Awards	September 12, 2026	Variety, Reality, Game Show, or Television Special	Theresa Corvino	Won	
Primetime Emmy Awards	September 5–6, 2026	Outstanding Production Design for a Narrative Period or Fantasy Program (One Hour or More)	Warren Alan Young, Mark Larkin, and Halina Siwolop (for "Step into My Office")	Nominated	
Primetime Emmy Awards	September 5–6, 2026	Outstanding Cinematography for a Series (One Hour)	Darran Tiernan (for "Step into My Office")	Won	
Primetime Emmy Awards	September 5–6, 2026	Outstanding Title Design	Mason Nicoll, Andrew Julien, Arik Weiss, Peter Pak, John Van Unen, Daniel Duda, Christian Arnsparger, and Rachel Brickel	Won	
Primetime Emmy Awards	September 5–6, 2026	Outstanding Prosthetic Makeup	Vincent Van Dyke, Ken Niederbaumer, Gabriel De Cunto, Stephen Prouty, Dave Snyder, Chris Gallaher, Jamie Kelman, and Gary J. Tunnicliffe (for "Betrayal")	Nominated	
Primetime Emmy Awards	September 5–6, 2026	Outstanding Music Composition for a Series (Original Dramatic Score)	Kris Bowers and Michael Dean Parsons (for "Step into My Office")	Nominated	
Primetime Emmy Awards	September 5–6, 2026	Outstanding Original Music and Lyrics	"The Devil You Know" by Warren Oak Felder, Sebastian Kole, and Daniel Pemberton (from "A Mistake I'll Never Make Again")	Nominated	
Primetime Emmy Awards	September 5–6, 2026	Outstanding Sound Editing for a Comedy or Drama Series (One Hour)	Ethan Beigel, Andy Sisul, Will Digby, Ryan Collins, Arielle McGrail, Caitlin Lutenske, DeVaughn Watts, Sanaa Kelley, and Matt Salib (from "The Man in the Mask")	Won	
Primetime Emmy Awards	September 5–6, 2026	Outstanding Sound Mixing for a Comedy or Drama Series (One Hour)	Nick Offord, Ryan Collins, Matthew Sanchez, Jordan McClain, Scott Michael Smith, and Aaron Hasson (for "Step into My Office")	Nominated	
Primetime Emmy Awards	September 5–6, 2026	Outstanding Special Visual Effects in a Single Episode	Hnedel Maximore, Brooke Noska, Adam Rothstein, Timothy Hanson, Jorge Macias, Taylor Faulkinberry, Joseph C Bond IV, Suzie Askham, Tommy Tran, Cameron Neilson, Adam Balentine, and Sebastiano D'Aprile (for "Nightmare on a Gurney")	Won	
Primetime Emmy Awards	September 5–6, 2026	Outstanding Stunt Coordination for Comedy Programming	Freddy Bouciegues and Hugh Aodh O'Brien	Won	
Primetime Emmy Awards	September 5–6, 2026	Outstanding Stunt Performance	Solomon Brende, Jimmy Chhiu, Micaiah Chau, and Kyle Potter (for "Tread Lightly")	Nominated	
Harvey Awards	October 9, 2026	Best Adaptation from Comic Book/Graphic Novel	Spider-Noir	Won	
Hollywood Music in Media Awards	November 18, 2026	Original Score – TV Show/Limited Series	Kris Bowers and Michael Dean Parsons	Nominated	
Hollywood Music in Media Awards	November 18, 2026	Main Title Theme – TV Show/Limited Series	Sebastian Kole, Warren Oak Felder, and Jayme Silverstein	Nominated	
