= Weapons (2025 film) =

2025 American film by Zach Cregger

- Theatrical release poster
- Directed by: Zach Cregger
- Written by: Zach Cregger
- Produced by: Zach Cregger; Roy Lee; Miri Yoon; J. D. Lifshitz; Raphael Margules
- Starring: Josh Brolin; Julia Garner; Alden Ehrenreich; Austin Abrams; Cary Christopher; Benedict Wong; Amy Madigan
- Cinematography: Larkin Seiple
- Edited by: Joe Murphy
- Music by: Ryan Holladay; Hays Holladay; Zach Cregger
- Production companies: New Line Cinema; Subconscious; Vertigo Entertainment; BoulderLight Pictures
- Distributed by: Warner Bros. Pictures
- Release date: August 8, 2025
- Running time: 128 minutes
- Country: United States
- Language: English
- Budget: $38 million
- Box office: $270 million

Weapons is a 2025 American supernatural mystery horror film written, produced, directed, and co-scored by Zach Cregger. It stars an ensemble cast including Josh Brolin, Julia Garner, Alden Ehrenreich, Austin Abrams, Cary Christopher, Toby Huss, Benedict Wong, and Amy Madigan. Its plot follows the case of seventeen children from the same classroom who mysteriously run away on the same night at the same time.

After the critical and commercial success of his film Barbarian (2022), Cregger began working on the spec script for Weapons. It prompted a bidding war between several studios, with New Line Cinema emerging as the victor. Initially intended to film from May to July 2023, several actors dropped out due to conflicts caused by the 2023 Hollywood labor disputes. Casting resumed in February 2024 and ended in May of that year. Filming began in Atlanta and concluded in July.

Weapons was released in theaters in North America on August 8, 2025, by Warner Bros. Pictures. The film received critical acclaim, and was a box-office success, grossing $270 million against a $38 million budget. Madigan's performance was singled out for praise, winning the Academy Award and the Actor Award (SAG Award) for Best Supporting Actress, and was also nominated for a Golden Globe Award in the same category. A prequel, Gladys, is scheduled for 2028.

== Plot ==
A child narrator explains that on a Wednesday night two years prior, seventeen children in Maybrook, Pennsylvania, ran out of their homes at 2:17 a.m. and vanished into the night. The missing were all students of Justine Gandy's third-grade class, from which only one child, Alex Lilly, remained. Justine is accused by the students' parents of being involved in their disappearance, and she is placed on administrative leave. One father, Archer Graff, is particularly suspicious of her.

Justine relapses into alcoholism and has a one-night stand with her married ex-boyfriend, police officer Paul Morgan. Concerned for Alex's welfare, Justine follows him home and discovers his house's windows covered with newspaper and his parents sitting motionless inside. Paul's wife, Donna, follows Justine into a liquor store and accosts her, accusing her of getting Paul drunk and sleeping with him. When Justine falls asleep in her car while staking out the house, Alex's mother exits in a trance and cuts a lock of Justine's hair while she sleeps.

Frustrated with the lack of leads, Archer starts his own investigation. After comparing his and another couple's video doorbell footage, Archer discovers the children's paths were directly converging on an unknown location. Both Archer and Justine become plagued by nightmares of the missing children, along with a mysterious elderly woman.

While on patrol, Paul prevents James, a homeless drug addict, from committing a burglary and pricks himself on a needle in James's pocket while frisking him. Paul punches James, then releases him after realizing his patrol car's camera recorded the assault. James burgles Alex's house, discovering the missing children in the basement, seemingly catatonic. While heading to the police station to claim the reward money, he is noticed by Paul, who chases him into the woods, thinking James was there to report the assault. James briefly encounters the mysterious woman before Paul catches him. James tells him of the children's whereabouts, and Paul brings James to Alex's house to investigate. Paul leaves a handcuffed James in the car, and after several hours, he bursts from the house and drags James inside.

Principal Marcus Miller is persuaded by Justine to conduct a wellness check on Alex. Before he can schedule it, the mysterious woman arrives at his office and introduces herself as Alex's Aunt Gladys, claiming she is helping to care for Alex's ill parents. Although she assures Marcus everything is alright, he insists on the welfare check. Gladys later accosts Marcus at his home, cutting a lock of hair from Marcus's husband Terry and using it to perform a bewitchment ritual on Marcus. Marcus is compelled to murder Terry at Gladys's command and is ordered to kill Justine next. Marcus locates Justine at a gas station, where she is arguing with Archer. Archer defends Justine long enough for her to escape in her car. When Marcus tries to give chase, he is fatally hit by another car. Archer later reconciles with Justine. Later that night, they deduce that the children were all converging on Alex's house on the night of the disappearance.

It is revealed that Alex's mother had invited Gladys, a witch who is a distant and homeless relative, into their home, where she bewitched his parents, compelling them into self-harm in order to force Alex to do her bidding. Alex obeyed Gladys's order to gather personal belongings from his classmates, which she used to summon them to the house, where she keeps them locked in the basement in order to feed off their energy. After realizing she has been discovered, Gladys makes preparations to leave with Alex when Archer and Justine arrive. They are immediately attacked by the bewitched Paul and James, who are both shot dead by Justine. Archer enters the basement, only to be ambushed and bewitched by Gladys into attacking Justine. Alex, meanwhile, breaks a totem to target Gladys with her own spell. The children pursue Gladys through the neighborhood, ultimately catching her and tearing her apart. Gladys's death breaks the spell over her victims, although all but Archer are left catatonic. Justine finds Alex embracing his parents, while Archer carries his son Matthew home.

The child narrator reveals that Alex moved out of town to live with a different aunt after his parents were institutionalized. The children all returned home, and some have even started talking again recently.

== Cast ==
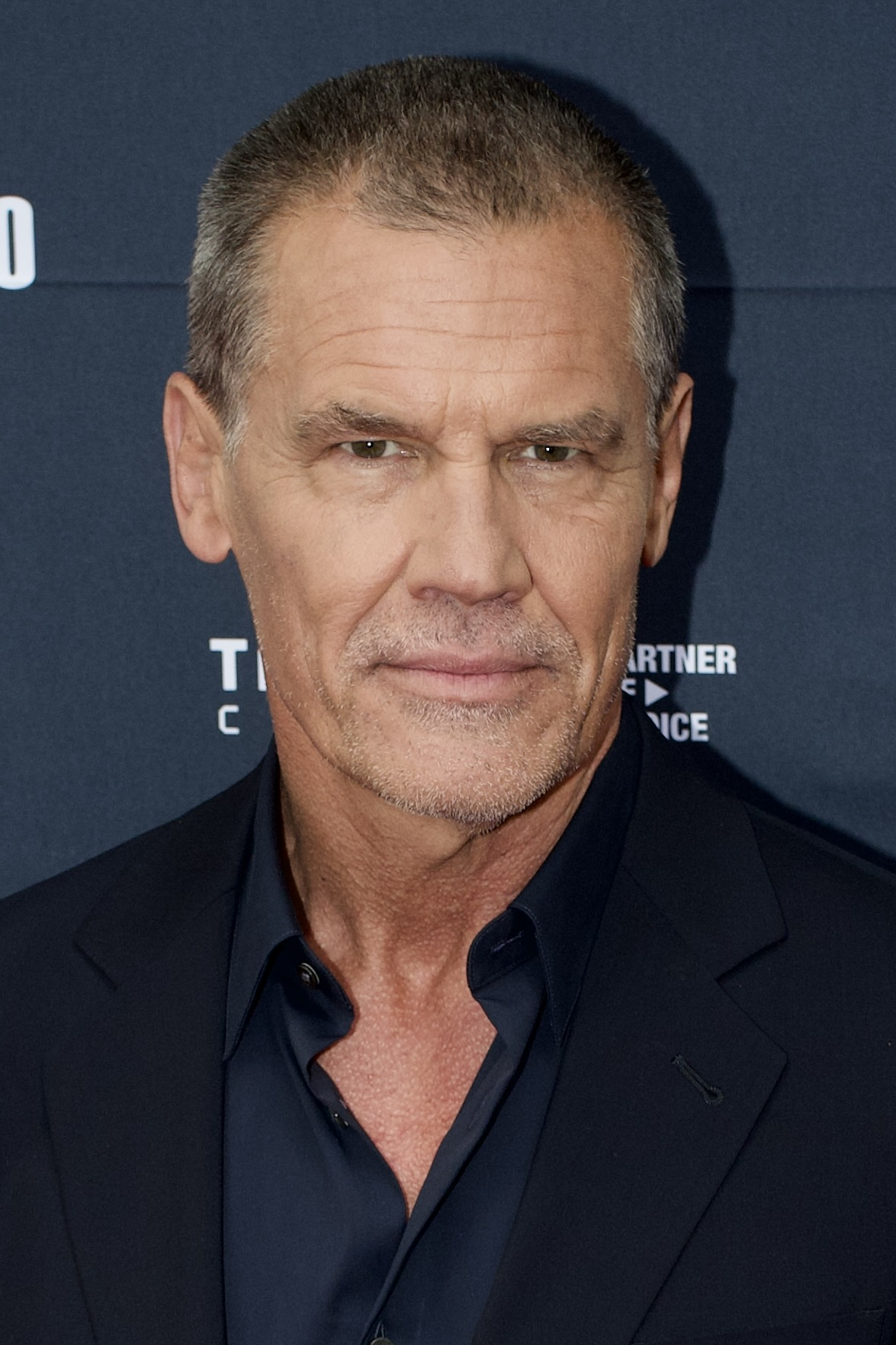
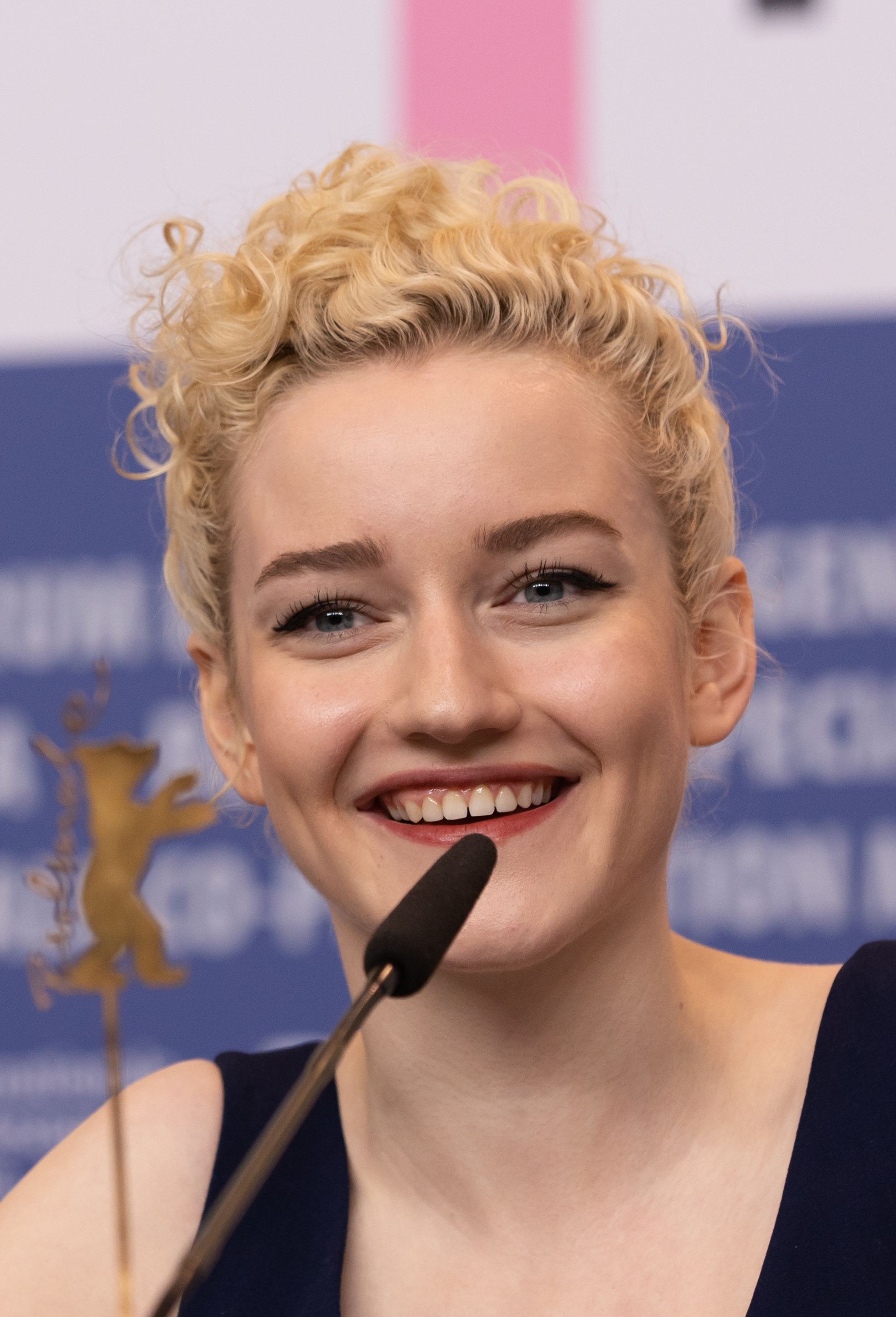
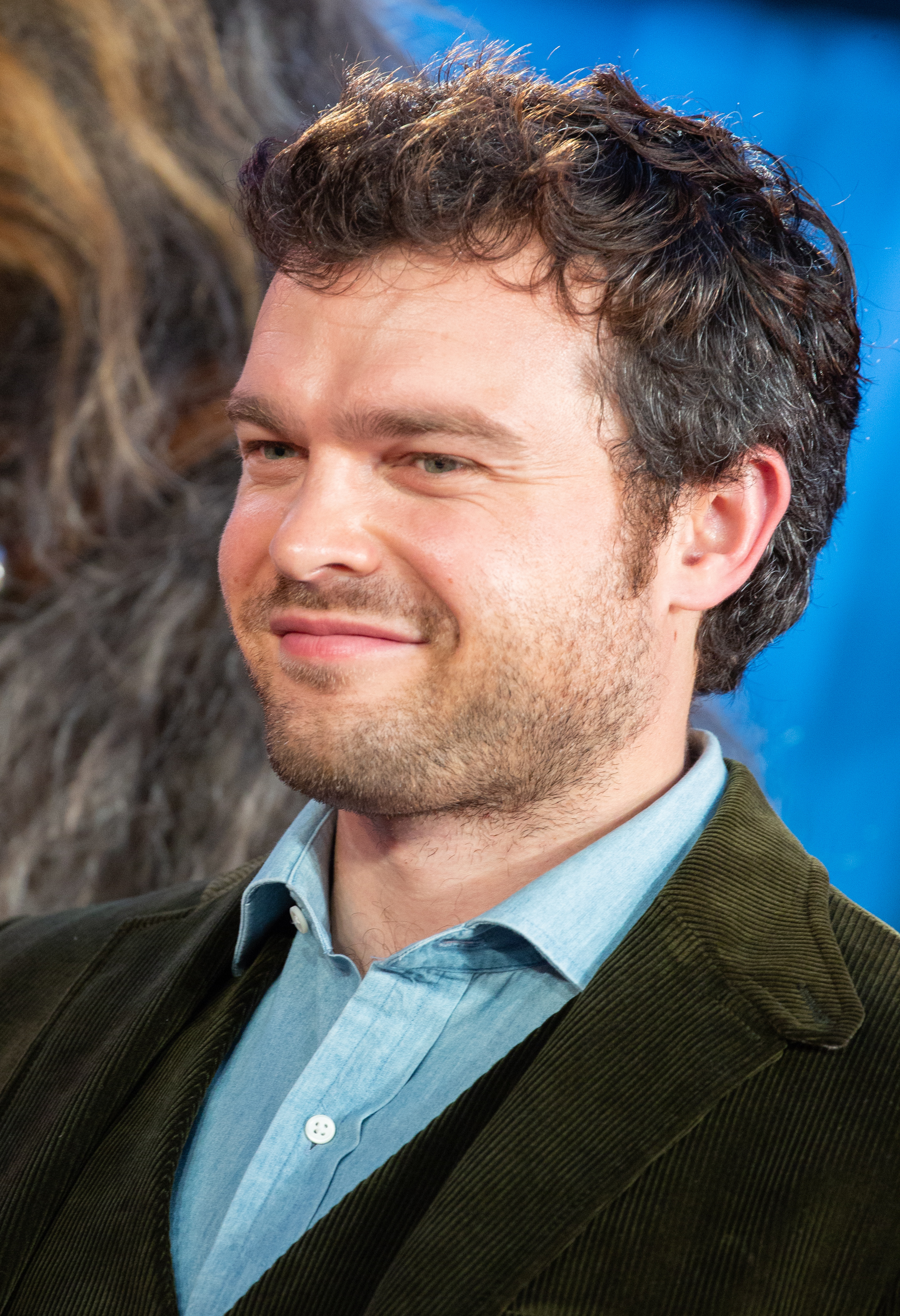
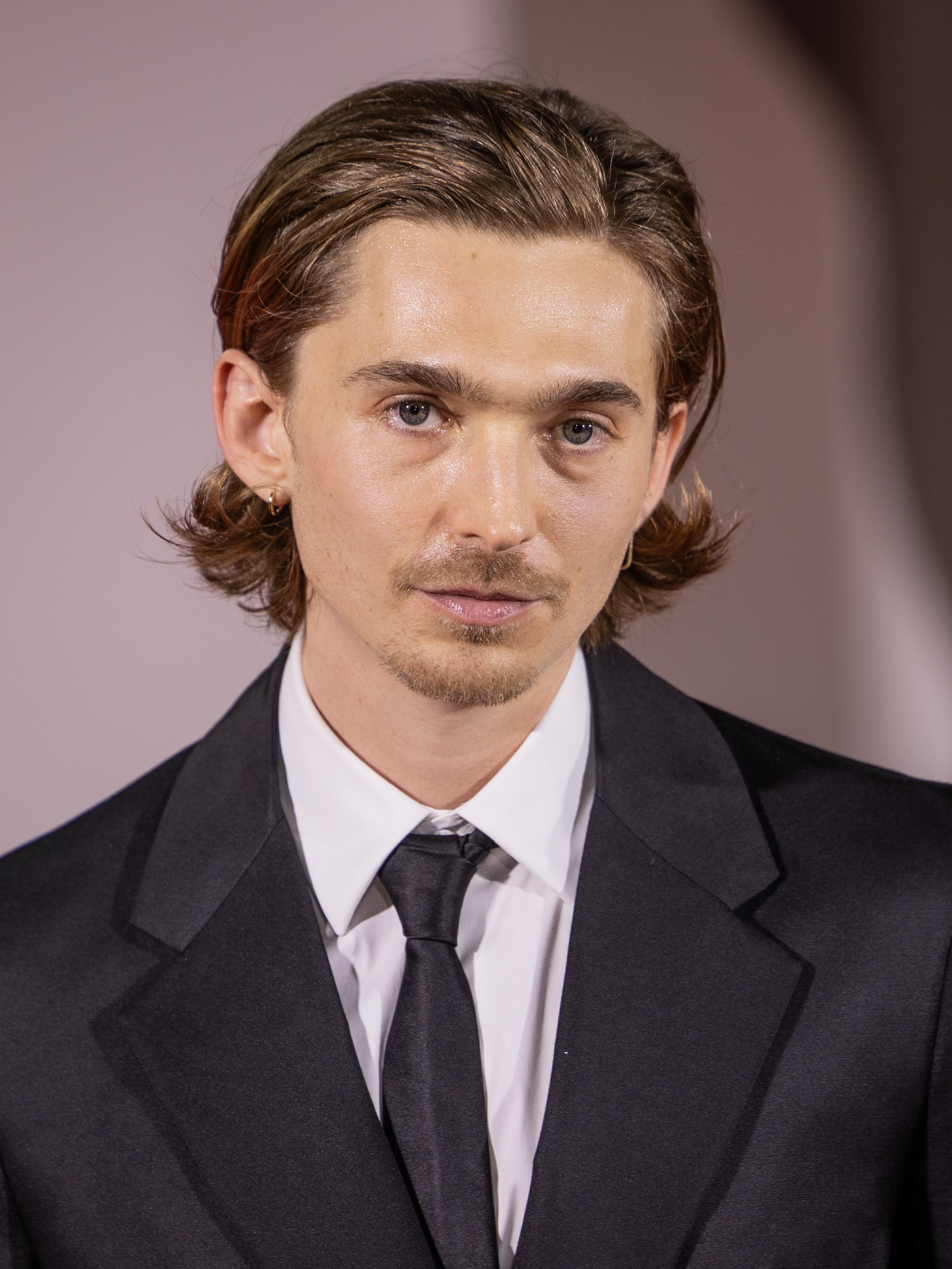
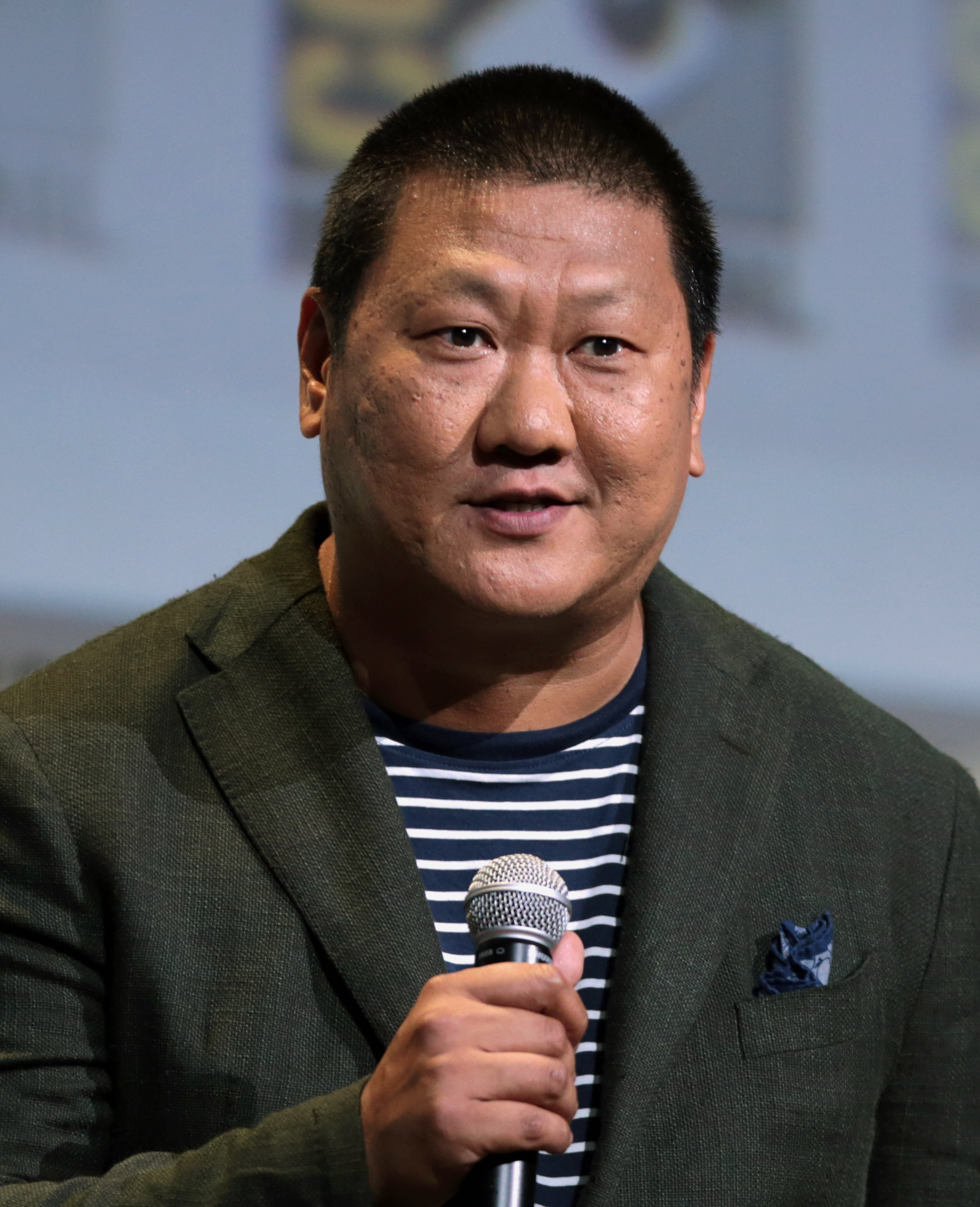
Josh Brolin, Julia Garner, Alden Ehrenreich, Austin Abrams and Benedict Wong play Archer, Justine, Paul, James and Marcus, respectively.
- Josh Brolin as Archer Graff, a construction contractor and the father of Matthew, one of the missing children
- Julia Garner as Justine Gandy, an elementary school teacher whose class has vanished
- Alden Ehrenreich as Paul Morgan, a police officer and Justine's ex-boyfriend
- Austin Abrams as James, a homeless drug addict and burglar
- Cary Christopher as Alex Lilly, the only child from Justine's class who did not disappear
- Amy Madigan as Aunt Gladys, Alex's elderly relative
- Toby Huss as Ed Locke, the police captain and Paul's father-in-law
- Benedict Wong as Marcus Miller, the sympathetic school principal
- Sara Paxton as Erica, the mother of Bailey, one of the missing children
- Justin Long as Gary, the father of Bailey, one of the missing children
- June Diane Raphael as Donna Morgan, Paul's wife and Ed's daughter
- Whitmer Thomas as Alex's father
- Callie Schuttera as Alex's mother
- Luke Speakman as Matthew Graff, Archer's son and one of Justine's missing students
- Clayton Farris as Terry Miller, Marcus's husband
- Scarlett Sher as voice of the child narrator

== Production ==
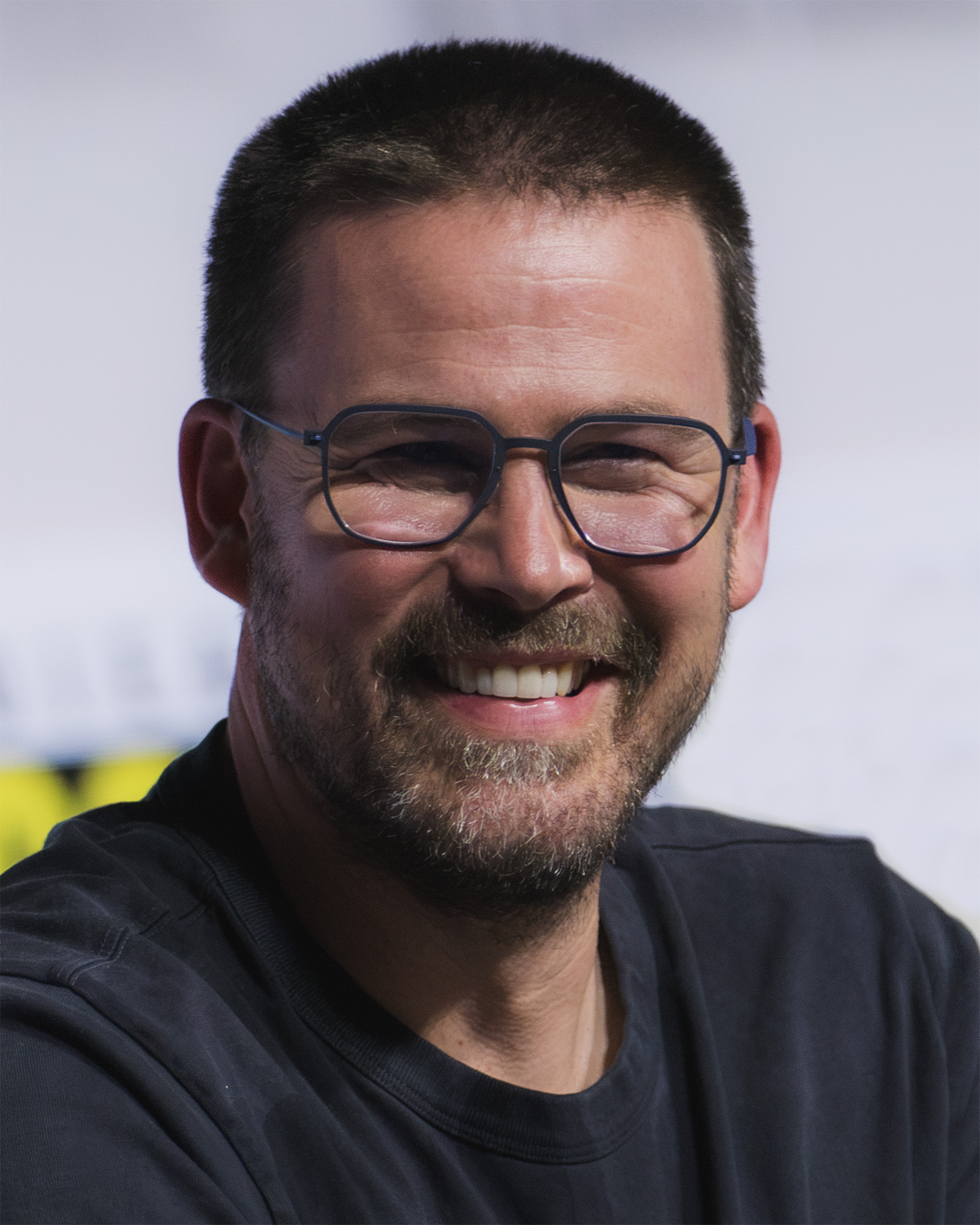
Zach Cregger auctioned the rights to the film's script for $38 million.

=== Development ===
After the financial and critical success of his film Barbarian (2022), Zach Cregger began work on a new spec script titled Weapons. It has been described as a "horror epic" with a more "personal story" for the filmmaker. He cited the films Magnolia (1999), Prisoners (2013) and the Jennifer Egan novel A Visit from the Goon Squad (2010) as inspiration. Cregger was inspired to write the screenplay after the death of his close friend and collaborator, Trevor Moore. A reference to a sketch written by Moore for The Whitest Kids U' Know was added into the finished script. The screenplay entered the market on January 22, 2023, sparking interest by Netflix, New Line Cinema, TriStar Pictures and Universal Pictures.

Cregger electronically distributed the script to studios early one morning and by 8 a.m. Michael De Luca, CEO of Warner Bros. Pictures, contacted him to close the deal. The exchange took less than 90 minutes, according to Cregger. New Line secured the rights within 24 hours after offering $38 million to cover all costs, including production and salaries. Cregger received $10 million as writer, director and producer and a final cut privilege (pending test screening reactions to the film) in addition to a guaranteed theatrical release. Universal offered $7 million less than Warner Bros. Jordan Peele's company Monkeypaw Productions participated in the bidding war in conjunction with Universal. Peele dismissed longtime managers Joel Zadak and Peter Principato, the latter of whom was also Cregger's manager, after losing the opportunity.

Cregger's CAA agent, Joe Mann, negotiated the $10 million upfront fee. Cregger deferred $2 million in return for 50 backend points on the film. Revisions to the script following the sale included having Archer apologize to his employees during a scene at a construction site as well as having Alex steal the name tags for Aunt Gladys.

=== Casting ===
In May 2023, Pedro Pascal and Renate Reinsve were announced as part of the cast. Cregger later confirmed that the original cast included Pascal and Reinsve alongside Brian Tyree Henry and Austin Abrams. Production was delayed by the 2023 Hollywood labor disputes, which created schedule conflicts for the four actors, particularly for Pascal who had several projects lined up.

In February 2024, Josh Brolin replaced Pascal. In April, Julia Garner and Alden Ehrenreich were cast in the film. In May, Benedict Wong, Amy Madigan, Austin Abrams, Cary Christopher and June Diane Raphael joined the cast. Abrams was the only cast member from the original cast to remain in the final film, explaining, "I loved the part and I didn't wanna let it go. So I just really held on 'cause I really wanted to do it."

The importance of Gladys' character necessitated the correct casting for that role. Cregger recalled liking Madigan's performance in Field of Dreams (1989), and believed she would give a great performance after spotting her in a list of potential casting choices. According to him, Madigan "saved" the film. When discussing the character, he stated that he gave her two options as to Gladys's origin: one where she was a regular person using witchcraft to prevent her dying from an incurable condition, and one where she was instead an immortal creature performing an approximate simulacrum of a human being, but that he did not ask her which one she chose.

=== Filming and post-production ===
Principal photography took place in the Atlanta area in May 2024 and wrapped in July 2024. The Maybrook Elementary School location was in Tucker, Georgia. According to Time Out, on the busiest days of filming, 170 children were involved. Child labor coordinators were enlisted to keep the kids engaged outside of filming. The gas station scenes were filmed over the course of three days at a BP gas station and convenience store in Covington, Georgia. The film initially ended with a silent shot of Matthew. After it received negative reactions at a test screening, a voiceover from the child narrator was added.

=== Music ===
The soundtrack to Weapons was released by WaterTower Music on August 1, 2025. The soundtrack contains 36 tracks composed by Ryan Holladay, Hays Holladay and Cregger himself. Additionally, the opening sequence of the film features the song "Beware of Darkness" by George Harrison and the end credits feature the song "Under the Porch" by MGMT. The protagonist Justine also, briefly, plays the song "Gotta Get Up" by Harry Nilsson on her cell phone speaker.

== Release and reception ==
Weapons was originally scheduled to be theatrically released in the United States and Canada on January 16, 2026, before being rescheduled to be released on August 8, 2025, due to strong, positive reception from test screenings. The earliest Thursday screenings were held at 2:17 p.m., a reference to the film having 2:17 a.m. as a major plot point. The film was released on VOD on September 9, 2025, and on DVD, Blu-ray and Ultra HD Blu-ray on October 14, 2025. The film was released on HBO Max on October 24, 2025.

=== Box office ===
Weapons grossed $151.6 million in the United States and Canada, and $118.4 million in other territories, for a worldwide total of $270 million. In September 2025, Variety reported the film was expected to make a theatrical profit of at least $65 million.

In the United States and Canada, Weapons was released alongside Freakier Friday and Sketch, and was projected to gross $25–40 million from 3,200 theaters in its opening weekend. It grossed $18.2 million on its first day, including $5.7 million from Thursday previews. It went on to debut to $43.5 million, topping the box office and making Warner Bros. the first studio in history to have six consecutive films open at #1 with more than $40 million (Weapons followed A Minecraft Movie, Sinners, Final Destination Bloodlines, F1 and Superman). The film dropped only 44% in the second weekend, grossing $24.4 million while maintaining the top spot. The film dropped to second place in its third weekend behind the sing-along version of KPop Demon Hunters, which grossed $19.2 million, while Weapons grossed $15.4 million.

=== Critical response ===
On the review aggregator website Rotten Tomatoes, 93% of 400 critics' reviews are positive, with an average rating of 8.1/10. The website's consensus reads: "Zach Cregger spins an expertly crafted yarn of terrifying mystery and thrilling intrigue in Weapons, a sophomore triumph that solidifies his status as a master of horror." Metacritic, which uses a weighted average, assigned the film a score of 81 out of 100, based on 48 critics, indicating "universal acclaim". Audiences polled by CinemaScore gave the film an average grade of "A−" on an A+ to F scale, while those surveyed by PostTrak gave it an average 4 out of 5 stars, with 65% saying they would "definitely recommend" it.

The San Francisco Chronicle dubbed Cregger a "true horror auteur". Empire gave Weapons 5/5 stars, marveling that Cregger seemed to effortlessly turn parental grief over missing children into a crowd-pleasing subject. Brian Tallerico of RogerEbert.com gave the film 3.5/4 stars and deemed it superior to Barbarian, "One of the greatest strengths of Cregger's ambitious script is its abject refusal to connect every dot in the manner that so much 'elevated horror' has done in recent years. Still, it's not overly difficult to read the inciting incident of Weapons as a school shooting allegory." Variety praised the film, "Regardless of how you feel about the bittersweet ending (and many will happily embrace the movie's darkly comic bittersweet finale), Cregger has achieved something remarkable here, crafting a cruel and twisted bedtime story of the sort the Brothers Grimm might have spun—not the kid-friendly Disney version, mind you, but the kind where characters kill on command and audiences find it difficult to sleep afterward."

Tim Grierson of Screen Daily felt the finale was "superbly orchestrated" and praised Cregger for "answering the riddles he has teased throughout the runtime". Lisa Wright of London Evening Standard stated that "if you enjoyed the bonkers roll out of The Substance, chances are you'll like this. It all makes for a winning watch, with more layers than your average scare fest and a twinkle in its evil eye." Charles Pulliam-Moore of The Verge praised the film's meditation on "how communities often conjure up convenient boogeymen to blame, rather than confronting the things that actually endanger children."

Tom Jorgensen of IGN scored the film 9/10, and called it, "a righteous, fully actualized genre-bender in which writer-director Zach Cregger hones Barbarian's blend of unbearable tension and dark humor to a new level of razor-sharpness." The Associated Press gave the film 4.5/5 stars, "If Barbarian came out of left field three years ago and heralded an exciting new voice in filmmaking, Weapons doesn't disappoint but it doesn't have the advantage of surprise."

In her review for The New York Times, Manohla Dargis felt Cregger's structure was not completely successful, saying, "the segmentation and overlapping just feel like a whole lot of delay tactics." William Bibbiani of TheWrap praised the cinematography for finding "the eeriest camera angle in damn near every scene, whether it's overtly shocking or insidiously banal", but he found the ending contrived, especially given how Cregger "invited us to ponder more powerful possibilities for over an hour before tipping his hand."

=== Accolades ===
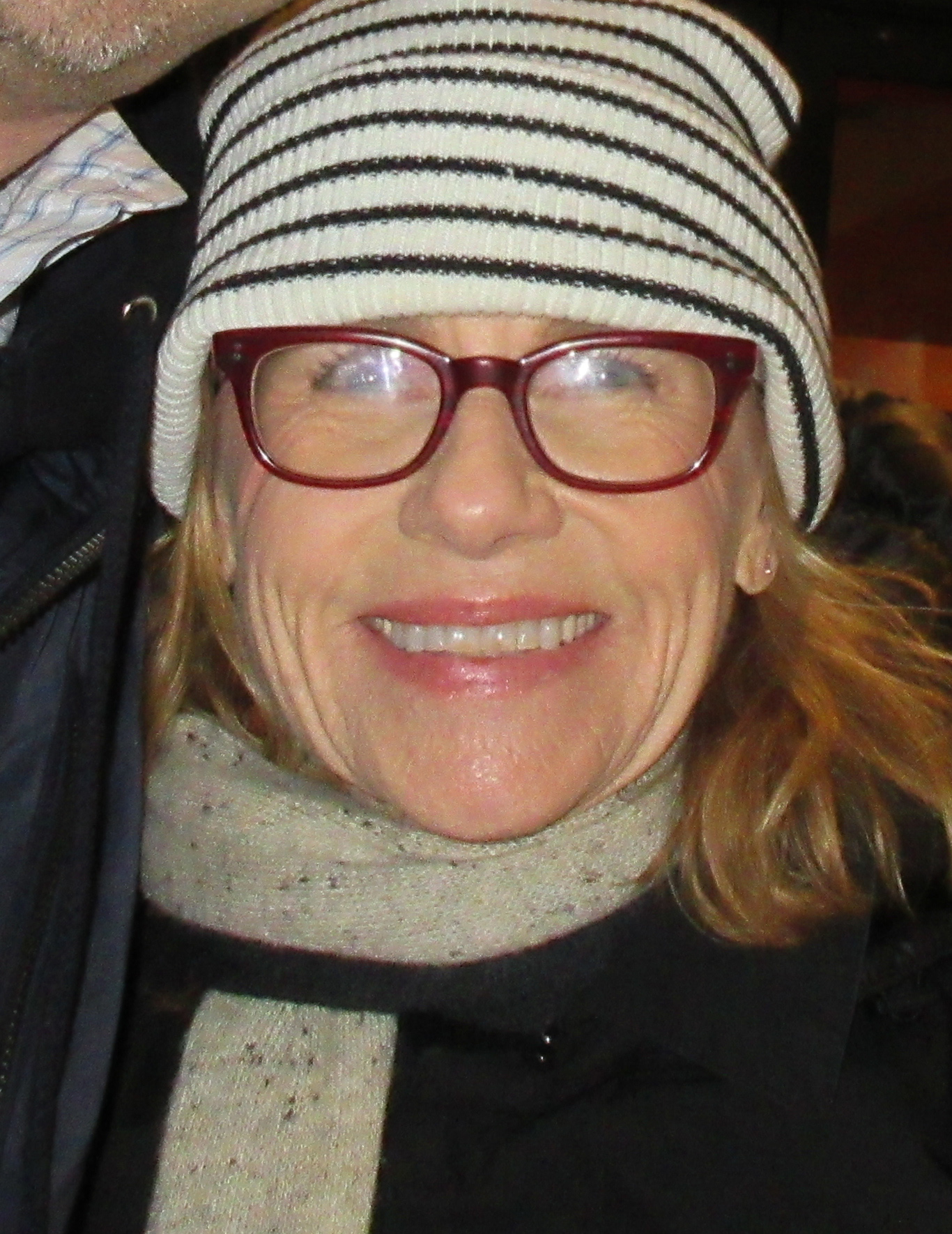
Madigan won the Actor Award and Academy Award for her performance, along with receiving a Golden Globe Award nomination among other plaudits.

Madigan won the Academy Award, the Actor Award and the Critics' Choice Award for Best Supporting Actress, and was also nominated for a Golden Globe Award in the same category. It marks Madigan's first Academy Award nomination since 1986, marking the longest period between two nominations for an actress. Cregger was nominated for the Critics' Choice Award and Writers Guild of America Award for Best Original Screenplay.

Weapons was shortlisted for the Academy Award's newest category of Best Casting for the 98th ceremony. It was nominated for the Golden Globe Award for Cinematic and Box Office Achievement and the Producers Guild of America Award for Best Theatrical Motion Picture.

== Future ==
Cregger discussed a potential sequel to Weapons in an interview with Variety, saying he was excited about the idea but wanted to make other films first. In an interview with Fangoria, he said he had been discussing a concept for a prequel about Aunt Gladys with Warner Bros. In April 2026, it was reported that the prequel would be written by both Cregger and Zach Shields, though Cregger later clarified that Shields was solely writing the script based on a story they developed together. That month, it was announced the prequel would be released on September 8, 2028.
