= Mr. Mom (TV series) =

- Based on: Characters by John Hughes
- Written by: Mike Culbert; Mike Pellettieri; Leslie Rathe
- Directed by: LP
- Starring: Hayes MacArthur; Andrea Anders; Catherine Last; Elizabeth Last; Cary Christopher; Joey Kern
- Music by: David Alfonso; Alan Ett
- Country of origin: United States
- Original language: English
- No. of seasons: 1
- No. of episodes: 11

Production
- Executive producers: Julian Franco; Rachel Derrico; Jay Torres; Michael Schreiber; Reza Izad; Hayes MacArthur; Andrea Anders; Mike Culbert; Mike Pellettieri
- Producer: Nick Phillips
- Cinematography: Jonathan Nicholas
- Editor: Ian Kornbluth
- Running time: 30 minutes
- Production companies: MGM Television; Studio71

Original release
- Network: Vudu
- Release: September 12 – October 10, 2019

Related
- Mr. Mom

Mr. Mom is an American sitcom television series. Based on the 1983 film, it aired on Walmart's streaming service Vudu and serves as a continuation of the film, following an adult Megan Butler heading back into the workforce while her husband takes over the parental duties of their two children. The series serves as the first original series for the streaming service; it stars Hayes MacArthur and Andrea Anders as Greg and Megan Anderson, respectively, and premiered on September 12, 2019.

== Cast ==
- Hayes MacArthur as Greg Anderson
- Andrea Anders as Megan Anderson
- Catherine and Elizabeth Last as Hannah Anderson
- Cary Christopher as Zack Anderson
- Joey Kern as Rick Whelan

== Episodes ==
No.	Title	Directed by	Written by	Original release date
1	"Pilot"	LP	Mike Culbert, Mike Pellettieri & Leslie Rathe	September 12, 2019
2	"What about the kids?"	LP	Mike Culbert, Mike Pellettieri & Leslie Rathe	September 12, 2019
3	"The list"	LP	Mike Culbert, Mike Pellettieri & Leslie Rathe	September 19, 2019
4	"The sandman"	LP	Mike Culbert, Mike Pellettieri & Leslie Rathe	September 19, 2019
5	"Good cop, good cop"	LP	Mike Culbert, Mike Pellettieri & Leslie Rathe	September 19, 2019
6	"Date night"	LP	Mike Culbert, Mike Pellettieri & Leslie Rathe	September 26, 2019
7	"The salad days"	LP	Mike Culbert, Mike Pellettieri & Leslie Rathe	September 26, 2019
8	"Pitches be crazy"	LP	Mike Culbert, Mike Pellettieri & Leslie Rathe	October 3, 2019
9	"Crickets"	LP	Mike Culbert, Mike Pellettieri & Leslie Rathe	October 3, 2019
10	"Sick day"	LP	Mike Culbert, Mike Pellettieri & Leslie Rathe	October 10, 2019
11	"Three, two, one"	LP	Mike Culbert, Mike Pellettieri & Leslie Rathe	October 10, 2019
