= Darran Tiernan =

Irish cinematographer

- Occupation: Cinematographer
- Years active: 1995–present

Darran Tiernan is an Irish cinematographer. He won a Primetime Emmy Award in the category Outstanding Cinematography for his work on the television program Spider-Noir.
