= Callie Schuttera =

American actress

- Occupation: Actress
- Years active: 2009–present

Callie Schuttera is an American actress. She is best known for playing Alex's mother in the horror film Weapons and Helen Daniels in the award-winning indie film Blue.

== Early life ==
Schuttera grew up in the suburbs of Cincinnati, Ohio. After college she moved to Los Angeles and began working in voiceovers. She starred in the West Coast premiere of ‘Class’ that earned her a “Best Acting” award from Broadway World and was one of Garry Marshall's final stage productions before his passing.

== Career ==
Schuttera made her on-screen debut in the 2009 film Run Hollywood Summer portraying Star. Her first big role came playing Helen Daniels in the indie film Blue. For her role in Blue she won the best actress award the 2018 Austin Film Festival. Her biggest role so far has been playing Alex's mom in the award-winning horror film Weapons starring Josh Brolin and Julia Garner. She is set to appear in the horror film The Exit State along with Weapons co-star Clayton Farris.

== Personal life ==
Schuttera is a lesbian and is currently in a relationship with filmmaker Gabriela Ledesma. Together they founded Poison Pictures which works with the best up-and-coming filmmakers in LA and around the world to create high-quality products from start to finish

== Filmography ==
=== Film ===
Year	Title	Role	Notes
2009	Run Hollywood Run	Star	
2014	Fairytale Ending	Woman	Short
2014	Tyler	Woman	Short
2014	No Experience Necessary	Margo	Short
2015	Imaginary Numbers	Callie	Short
2016	Trust	Woman	Short
2016	Gold Diggers	Samantha	Short
2016	Anomic	Alexandra	Short
2017	Corrupt Moondocks	Voice Operator	Short
2017	I.C.E Cream	New Reporter	Short
2018	Blue	Helen Daniels	
2020	The Last Conception	Charley Burnell	
2021	Nightingale: A Melody of Life	Samantha	Short
2025	Weapons	Alex's Mom	
2026	The Exit State	Claire	

=== Television ===
Year	Title	Role	Notes
2015	Scraping By	Monica	Episode; Betting
2016	The Jeff Show	Anastasia Steele	Episode; Fifty Shade of Gray Part 2
2021	The Mosquito Coast	Skinny Woman	Episode; Light Out
2021	Wise Up	Host	7 episodes
2025	On Call	Mystery Mary	Episode; Laws of the Universe
2025	The Rookie	Mary Wallace	Episode; A Deadly Secret
