= Cary Christopher =

American child actor

- Born: May 6, 2016 (age 10); Los Angeles, California, U.S.
- Occupation: Actor
- Years active: 2018–present

Cary Christopher (born on May 6, 2016) is an American child actor who is known for his role as Alex Lilly in Weapons and his Emmy nominated role as Thomas DiMera in Days of Our Lives. He has made appearances in 9-1-1, NCIS, American Horror Stories, Spider-Noir, Fuller House, and Lanterns.

== Career ==
Cary Christopher was born in Los Angeles, California. He started his career by playing small roles in Fuller House and The Rookie. Christopher got his first big role in Days of Our Lives, playing Thomas DiMera, where, in 2023, he was nominated for a Daytime Emmy Award for Outstanding Younger Performer in a Drama Series. He also appeared in a Pringles commercial during the 2024 Super Bowl. He made his film debut in Weapons in a starring role. In 2026, he had a recurring role in the Spider-Noir television series, and guest-starred in DC Universe's Lanterns alongside Aaron Pierre and Kyle Chandler.

== Filmography ==
=== Television ===
Year	Title	Role	Notes
2019	Twisted Sisters	Cole	1 episode
2019	Mr. Mom	Zack Anderson	11 episodes
2020	9-1-1	Hayden Benson	1 episode
2020	Fuller House	Finn	1 episode
2020–present	Days of Our Lives	Thomas DiMera	Recurring role
2021	American Horror Stories	Little Boy	1 episode (“The Naughty List”)
2021	Station 19	Townhead Boy	1 episode
2024	NCIS	Kaiden Silcott	1 episode
2024	The Rookie	Joshua	2 episodes
2024	High Potential	Gavin Reed	1 episode
2025	Chicago Med	Lucas Early	1 episode
2026	It's Not Like That	Justin Jeffries	Recurring role
2026	Spider-Noir	Frankie	Recurring role
2026	Lanterns	Noah Macon	Guest role

=== Film ===
Year	Title	Role	Notes
2018	Culture Clash	Liam	TV Movie
2019	Intuitions	Wyatt	
2020	Mank	Young Joseph Mankiewicz	Deleted scenes
2024	An Almost Christmas Story	Moon (voice)	Short film
2025	Weapons	Alex Lilly	
2026	Outcome	Skylar William Woods	

== Awards and nominations ==
Award	Year	Category	Work	Result	Ref.
Critics' Choice Movie Awards	2026	Best Young Actor/Actress	Weapons	Nominated	
Daytime Emmy Awards	2023	Outstanding Younger Performer in a Drama Series	Days of Our Lives	Nominated	
San Diego Film Critics Society	2025	Best Youth Performance	Weapons	Won	
