= 28 Days Later (film series) =

British horror media franchise

- Logo featuring the biohazard symbol (☣)
- Created by: Alex Garland
- Original work: 28 Days Later (2002)
- Owners: Sony Pictures Entertainment (2024-present); Searchlight Pictures (1); 20th Century Studios (1-2); DNA Films (2002-present)
- Years: 2002–present

Print publications
- Comics: 28 Days Later
- Graphic novel: 28 Days Later: The Aftermath

Films and television
- Films: List of films

Audio
- Soundtracks: 28 Days Later: The Soundtrack Album; 28 Weeks Later: Original Motion Picture Soundtrack; 28 Years Later (Original Motion Picture Soundtrack); 28 Years Later: The Bone Temple (Original Motion Picture Soundtrack)

The 28 Days Later film series consists of post-apocalyptic horror films, based on a concept by Alex Garland. It includes four released films produced by DNA Films, with a sequel in development. The franchise depicts the outbreak of the Rage Virus, a contagious disease that induces homicidal rage in those infected. Following the virus's accidental release from a laboratory in England, the resulting epidemic causes widespread societal collapse.

The first film, 28 Days Later (2002) was well received by critics and a box office success. It has been called a horror classic and has a cult following. It has also been credited with redefining, influencing, and expanding the popularity of the zombie horror genre. The 2007 sequel, 28 Weeks Later, was also a financial success and received positive reviews.

Sony Pictures Releasing, through its Columbia Pictures label for distribution, continued the series with three additional sequels. The first sequel, 28 Years Later, was released on 20 June 2025, with the follow-up, 28 Years Later: The Bone Temple, released on 16 January 2026. A fifth film is also in development. Other media in the franchise includes the graphic novel 28 Days Later: The Aftermath (2007), and the comic book series 28 Days Later (2009–2011).

== Films ==
Film	US release date	Director	Screenwriter(s)	Producer(s)	Status
28 Days Later	June 27, 2003	Danny Boyle	Alex Garland	Andrew Macdonald	Released
28 Weeks Later	May 11, 2007	Juan Carlos Fresnadillo	Rowan Joffé, Juan Carlos Fresnadillo E. L. Lavigne & Jesús Olmo	Enrique López Lavigne, Andrew Macdonald & Allon Reich	Released
28 Years Later	June 20, 2025	Danny Boyle	Alex Garland	Andrew Macdonald, Peter Rice, Bernie Bellew, Danny Boyle & Alex Garland	Released
28 Years Later: The Bone Temple	January 16, 2026	Nia DaCosta	Alex Garland	Andrew Macdonald, Peter Rice, Bernie Bellew, Danny Boyle & Alex Garland	Released
Untitled fifth film	TBA	Danny Boyle	Alex Garland	Peter Rice, Danny Boyle, Alex Garland & Andrew Macdonald	On hold

=== 28 Days Later (2002) ===
When animal activists infiltrate a top-secret laboratory of scientists to release the animals, the activists unknowingly release chimpanzees infected with a pathogen, resulting in a rapid outbreak. The scientists were studying a highly contagious and powerful disease named the Rage Virus. Twenty-eight days afterward, a bicycle courier named Jim awakens in a hospital after a near-death accident placed him into a coma and under medical care, and discovers that Great Britain is completely desolated, with savage infected and crazed survivors.

=== 28 Weeks Later (2007) ===
During the first outbreak, survivors, including Donald Harris and his wife Alice, sheltered in an isolated London cottage. An orphaned boy begs for help, is allowed in, and a horde of infected follows, overtaking the home. Don retreats while the group is overwhelmed. Twenty-eight weeks later, the infected die off, and NATO controls Britain, establishing safe zones for refugees, including Tammy and Andy Harris, Don and Alice's children. When the children return home, they find their mother alive but infected with the Rage Virus. Chaos erupts as a second outbreak begins, and Major Scarlet Levy of the US Army must protect the children, believing they hold a potential cure for mankind.

=== 28 Years Later (2025) ===
As of 2024, a trilogy of sequels to 28 Days Later and 28 Weeks Later was in development, with Garland as screenwriter of all three.

Twenty-eight years after the Rage Virus devastated Great Britain, the island is heavily quarantined, and survivors of the outbreak are abandoned, forcing them to find ways to survive with the infected. When a father and son embark on a journey from the safety of a small island connected to the mainland by a single, heavily defended causeway, they discover many secrets and horrors of the outside world.

=== 28 Years Later: The Bone Temple (2026) ===
Nia DaCosta directed the fourth film; Danny Boyle, Garland, Andrew Macdonald, Peter Rice, and Bernie Bellew are attached as the producers. Principal photography was scheduled to commence directly after production was completed on 28 Years Later, and completed in October 2024. The film was released on 16 January 2026.

=== Untitled fifth film (TBA) ===
In January 2025, Boyle confirmed he would direct the third film in the new trilogy. In December 2025, Sony Pictures Releasing had officially greenlit the third film in the 28 Years Later trilogy, with Garland returning to write the script and Cillian Murphy in talks to reprise his role as Jim. In May 2026, Boyle revealed in an interview that he hopes to begin filming in 2027.

== Production ==
In June 2007, Fox Atomic studio confirmed potential for a third film, dependent upon the financial performance of the film following its home video release. In July of the same year, Boyle said that the story for a third installment had been mapped out. By October 2010, Garland stated that due to differences involving the film rights, but the project had been delayed. In January 2011 however, Boyle stated that he believed the project would be realised, stating confirming further developments for the story. By April 2013 however, the filmmaker expressed uncertainty as to whether the movie would be made. In January 2015, Garland addressed the project's status, confirming that while it had fallen into development hell there were serious discussions going on behind the scenes to produce the project. Reiterating that development was progressing, stating that the script he was working on would tentatively be titled 28 Months Later. In June 2019, Boyle confirmed that he and Garland had been working on the third installment. In March 2020, Imogen Poots expressed interest in reprising her role as Tammy Harris, followed by Murphy in May 2021.

In June 2023, Boyle and Garland expressed in collaboration their intentions to "seriously" and "diligently" see the project enter production; while announcing that the script was now titled 28 Years Later, acknowledging the years it had taken to be developed. Boyle stated that he would like to serve as director, unless Garland chooses to. By July of the same year, Murphy stated that he had recently discussed the possibility of a third film with Boyle; once again expressing interest in reprising his role if Boyle and Garland return to the franchise in their creative roles.

In January 2024, it was announced that a third film titled 28 Years Later, was officially in development; with plans for the project to be the first of a new trilogy of sequels. Boyle directed the first installment, with a script written by Garland; while the latter also wrote the scripts for each of planned sequels. Boyle, Garland, Macdonald, Rice, and Bellew all served as the producers with Murphy as an executive producer. Sony Pictures won a highly competitive studio bidding war for the distribution rights, beating out Warner Bros. Pictures, Universal Pictures, and Paramount Pictures, after Macdonald bought back the rights from Searchlight Pictures and 20th Century Studios. In February of the same year, Murphy discussed his potential involvement with the project. In March of the same year, Garland confirmed that he is writing a trilogy of sequel films. The following month, the writer stated that Kes was a major influence on his work for 28 Years Later. By April of the same year, Jodie Comer, Aaron Taylor-Johnson, and Ralph Fiennes all joined the cast, while Charlie Hunnam entered early negotiations to appear in its cast. Later that month, Garland announced that pre-production was underway on the film, while also confirming that the plot will explore how the passage of time influences survival in a post-apocalyptic society. In May of the same year, Murphy was confirmed to be reprising his role as Jim from 28 Days Later, though it was later announced that he would not appear in the first film of the trilogy. Jack O'Connell joined the cast in a supporting role as Jimmy Crystal, which expanded into a leading role for its sequel The Bone Temple. The project entered production back-to-back with The Bone Temple.

In May 2024, 28 Years Later began principal photography and was released on 20 June 2025.

== Main cast and characters ==
List indicators

This section includes characters who will appear or have appeared in the franchise in main roles.

- An empty grey cell indicates the character was not in the film, or that the character's official presence has not yet been confirmed.
- ^{C} indicates a cameo role.
- ^{U} indicates an uncredited appearance.
- ^{Y} indicates a younger version of the character.

Character
Character	28 Days Later	28 Weeks Later	28 Years Later	28 Years Later: The Bone Temple	Untitled third 28 Years Later film
Character	2002	2007	2025	2026	TBA
Jim	Cillian Murphy			Cillian Murphy^{U}^{C}	Cillian Murphy
Selena	Naomie Harris				
Hannah	Megan Burns				
Frank	Brendan Gleeson				
Maj. Henry West	Christopher Eccleston				
Mark	Noah Huntley				
Sgt. Farrell	Stuart McQuarrie				
Donald "Don" Harris		Robert Carlyle			
Maj. Scarlet Levy		Rose Byrne			
Sgt. Doyle		Jeremy Renner			
Tammy Harris		Imogen Poots			
Andy Harris		Mackintosh Muggleton			
BG. Stone		Idris Elba			
Alice Harris		Catherine McCormack			
Flynn		Harold Perrineau			
Spike			Alfie Williams	Alfie Williams	Alfie Williams
Kelly Jimmy Ink			Erin Kellyman	Erin Kellyman	Erin Kellyman
Jamie			Aaron Taylor-Johnson	Mentioned	TBA
Isla			Jodie Comer	Mentioned	
Dr. Ian Kelson			Ralph Fiennes	Ralph Fiennes	
Sir. Lord Jimmy Crystal			Jack O'Connell^{C} Rocco Haynes^{Y}	Jack O'Connell	
Jimmima			Emma Laird	Emma Laird	
Jimmy Jones			Maura Bird	Maura Bird	
"Samson"			Chi Lewis-Parry	Chi Lewis-Parry	TBA
Anthony			Geoffrey Newland		
Dave			Joe Blakemore		
Erik Sundqvist			Edvin Ryding		
Jimmy Fox			Sam Locke	Sam Locke	
Jimmy Jimmy			Robert Rhodes	Robert Rhodes	
Jimmy Snake			Ghazi Al Ruffai	Ghazi Al Ruffai	
Jimmy Shite			Connor Newall	Connor Newall	
Tom				Louis Ashbourne Serkis	
Cathy				Mirren Mack	
George				David Sterne	
Jonno				Gordon Alexander	
Matthew				Elliot Benn	
Jane Ji				Lynne Anne Rodgers	
Sam				Maiya Eastmond^{C}	Maiya Eastmond

== Additional production and crew details ==
Film	Crew/detail					
Film	Composer	Cinematographer	Editor	Production companies	Distribution companies	Running time
28 Days Later	John Murphy	Anthony Dod Mantle	Chris Gill	DNA Films; Film Council	Fox Searchlight Pictures	1 hr 53 mins
28 Weeks Later	John Murphy	Enrique Chediak	Chris Gill	Fox Atomic; DNA Films; Figment Films; Sogecine; Koan Films	20th Century Fox (UK); Fox Atomic (US)	1 hr 40 mins
28 Years Later	Young Fathers	Anthony Dod Mantle	Jon Harris	Columbia Pictures; Decibel Films; DNA Films	Sony Pictures Releasing	1 hr 55 mins
28 Years Later: The Bone Temple	Hildur Guðnadóttir	Sean Bobbitt	Jake Roberts	Columbia Pictures; Decibel Films; DNA Films	Sony Pictures Releasing	1 hr 49 mins
Untitled fifth film	TBA	TBA	TBA	Columbia Pictures; Decibel Films; DNA Films	Sony Pictures Releasing	TBA

== Reception ==
28 Days Later was well received by critics, and was a box office success. In the years that followed, contemporary analysis have called the release a horror classic with a cult following among its fans; while the movie has also been credited with redefining, as well as influencing, and expanding the popularity of the zombie horror genre.

28 Weeks Later was similarly a success critically, while it turned a smaller profit financially. Several reviews called it a rare worthy and successful sequel, and Philip French of The Guardian called it superior to its predecessor.

28 Years Later received generally positive reviews from critics and had the biggest opening for the series to date.

=== Box office and financial performance ===
Film	Box office gross			Box office ranking		Domestic home video sales	Budget	Ref.
Film	North America	Other territories	Worldwide	All-time North America	All-time worldwide	Domestic home video sales	Budget	Ref.
28 Days Later	$45,064,915	$37,719,602	$82,784,517	#2,110	#2,206	Information not publicly available	$8,000,000	
28 Weeks Later	$28,638,916	$43,665,883	$72,304,846	#3,075	#3,398	$25,267,593	$15,000,000	
28 Years Later	$70,446,897	$80,882,352	$151,329,249	#1,293	#1,341	Information not publicly available	$60,000,000	
28 Years Later: The Bone Temple	$25,147,583	$33,373,728	$58,521,311	#	#	TBD	$63,000,000	
Total	$169,298,311	$195,641,565	$364,939,923			$25,267,593	$146,000,000	

=== Critical and public response ===
Film	Rotten Tomatoes	Metacritic	CinemaScore
28 Days Later	87% (240 reviews)	73 (39 reviews)	—
28 Weeks Later	73% (200 reviews)	78 (34 reviews)	—
28 Years Later	88% (399 reviews)	77 (56 reviews)	B
28 Years Later: The Bone Temple	92% (338 reviews)	81 (58 reviews)	A−
