= Samuel Locke =

Samuel or Sam Locke may refer to:

- Samuel Locke (educator) (1732–1778), American clergyman and educator
- Samuel Locke (politician) (1836–1890), New Zealand politician
- Sam Locke (screenwriter) (1917–1998), American writer and director
- Sam Locke (golfer) (born 1998), Scottish professional golfer
- Sam Locke (actor) (born 2001), Welsh actor

== See also ==
- Samuel Loch (born 1983), Australian rower
