= Critics' Choice Super Award for Best Actor in a Horror Movie =

Film award

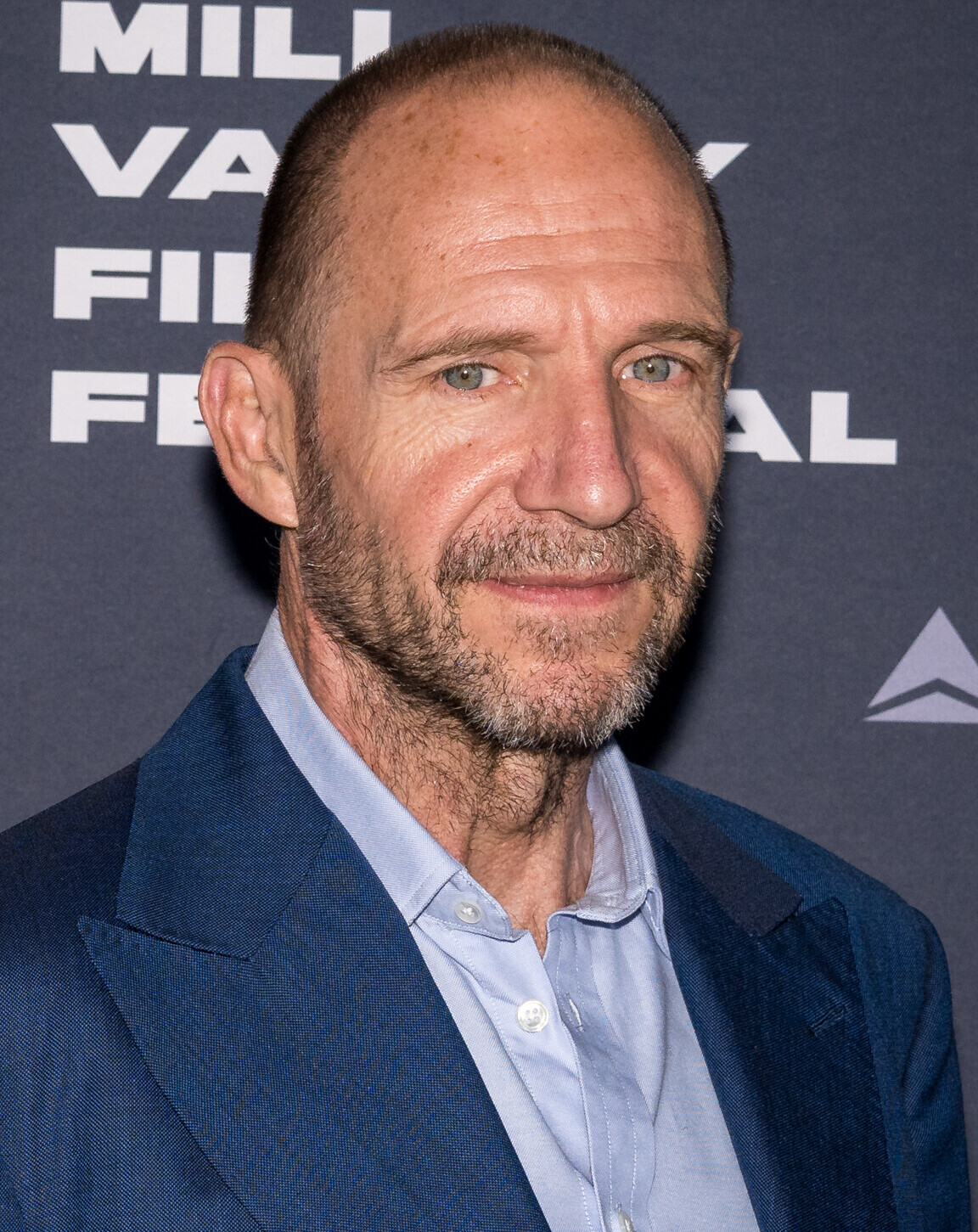
- The 2026 recipient: Ralph Fiennes
- Country: United States
- Presented by: Critics Choice Association
- First award: 2021
- Currently held by: Ralph Fiennes, 28 Years Later: The Bone Temple (2026)

Highlights
- Most wins: Ralph Fiennes (2)
- Most nominations: Nicolas Cage (3)
- Website: http://www.criticschoice.com/

The Critics' Choice Super Award for Best Actor in a Horror Movie is an award presented by the Critics Choice Association to the best performance by an actor in a horror film.

This award was first presented at the 1st Critics' Choice Super Awards in 2021 to Vince Vaughn for his role as the Blissfield Butcher in Freaky. The most nominated actor in this category is Nicolas Cage with 3 nominations, while Ralph Fiennes has the most wins with 2 wins.

The current recipient of the award is Fiennes for his role as Dr. Ian Kelson in 28 Years Later: The Bone Temple.

== Winners and nominees ==
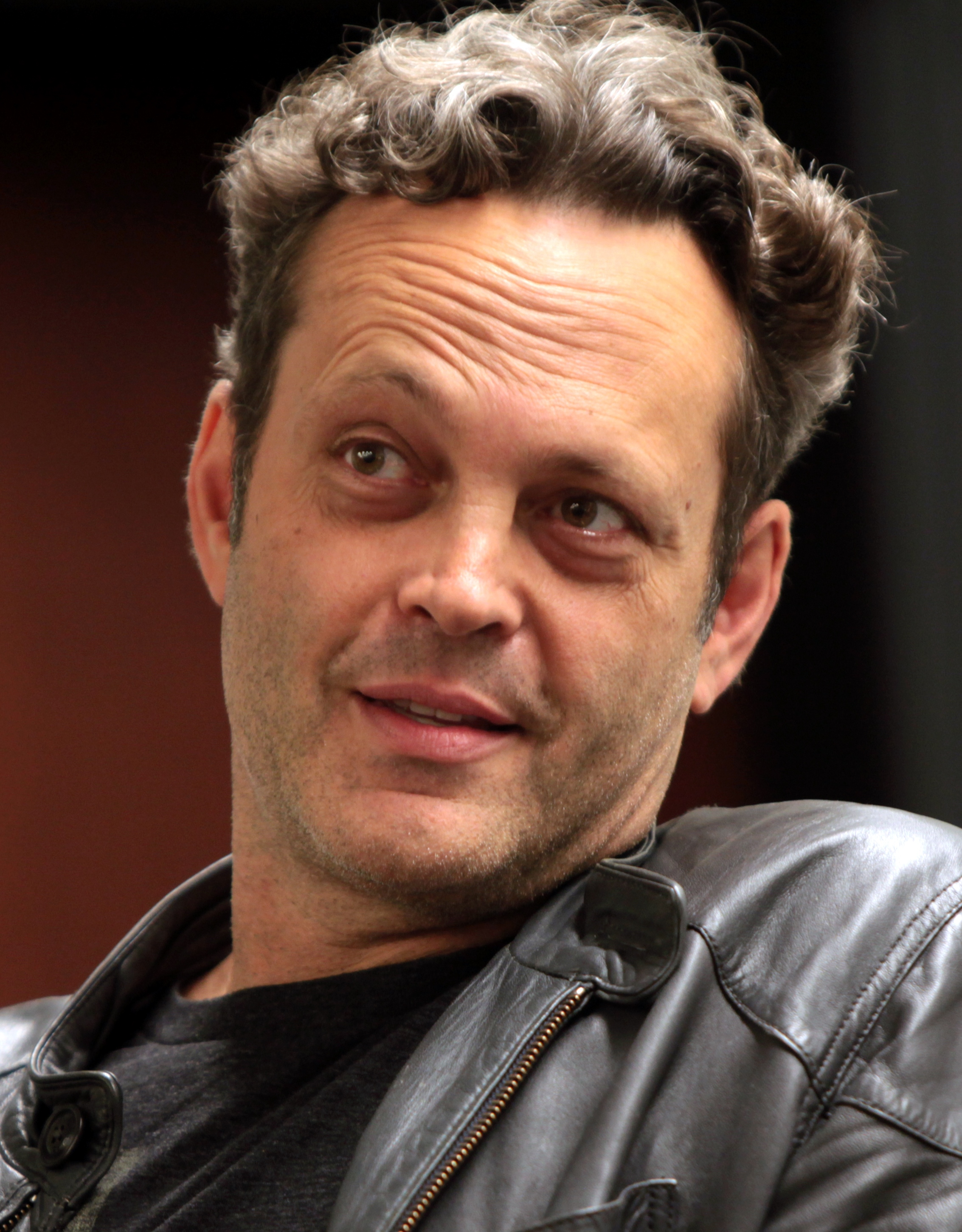
Vince Vaughn won for Freaky (2020)

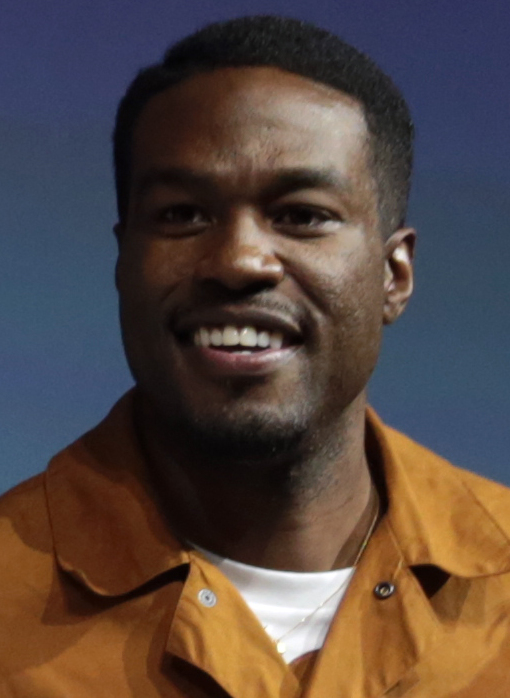
Yahya Abdul-Mateen II won for Candyman (2021)

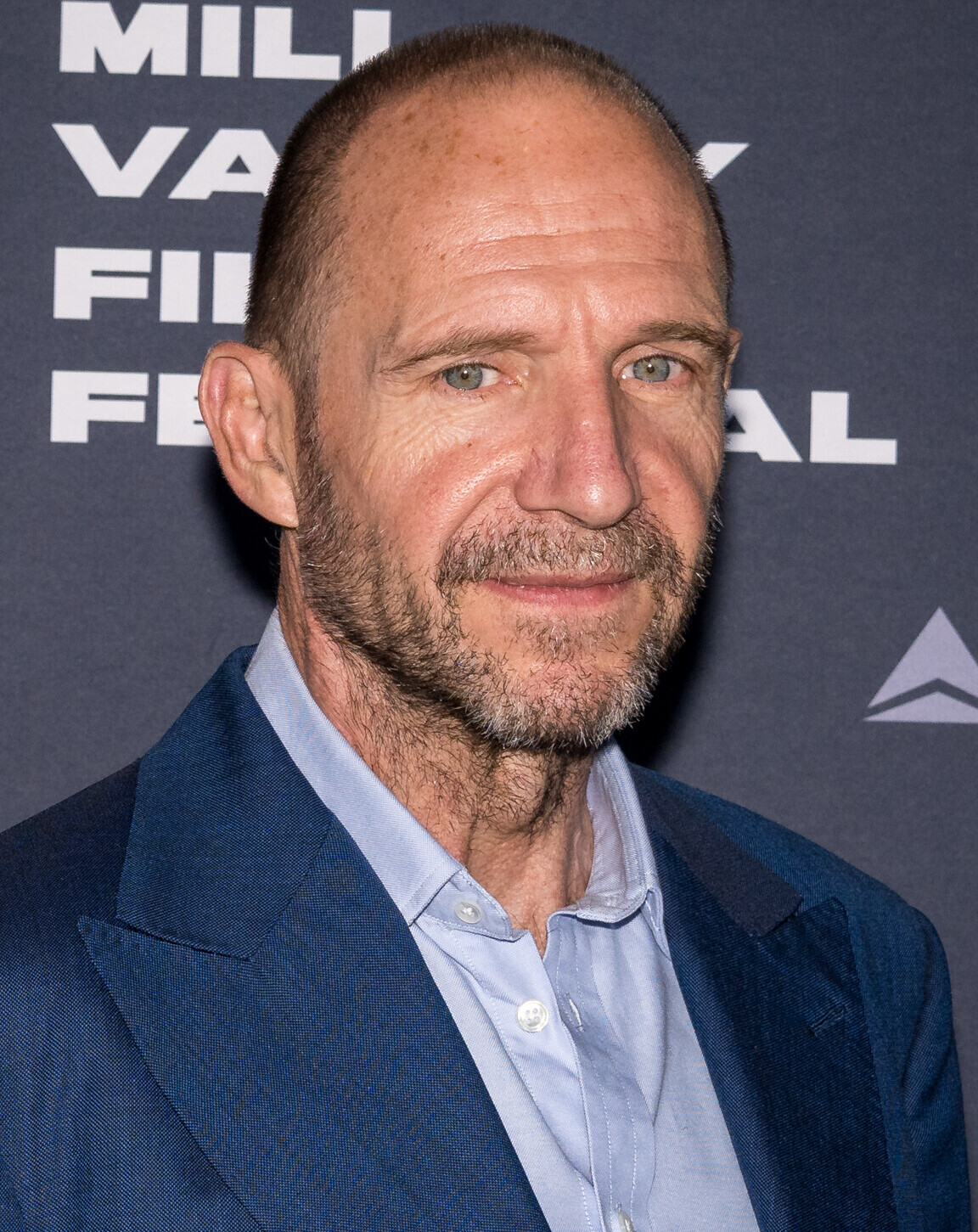
Ralph Fiennes won twice for The Menu (2022) and 28 Years Later: The Bone Temple (2026)

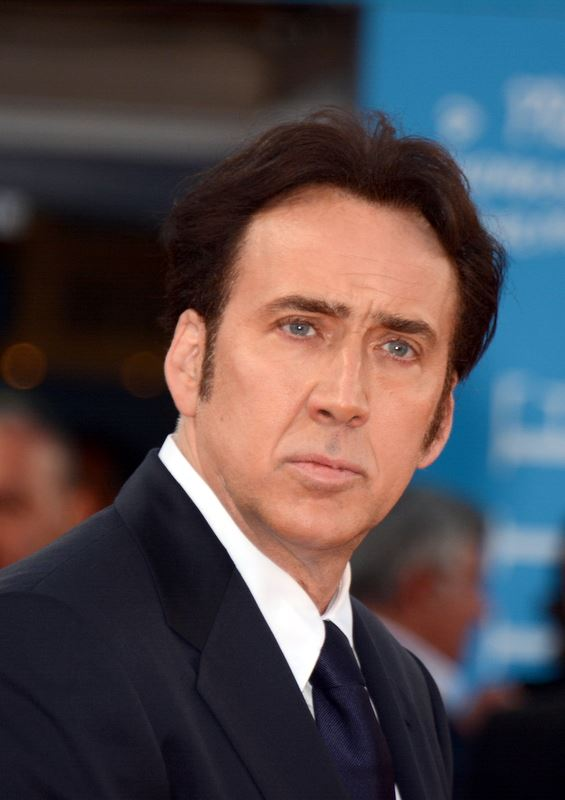
Nicolas Cage won for Dream Scenario (2023)

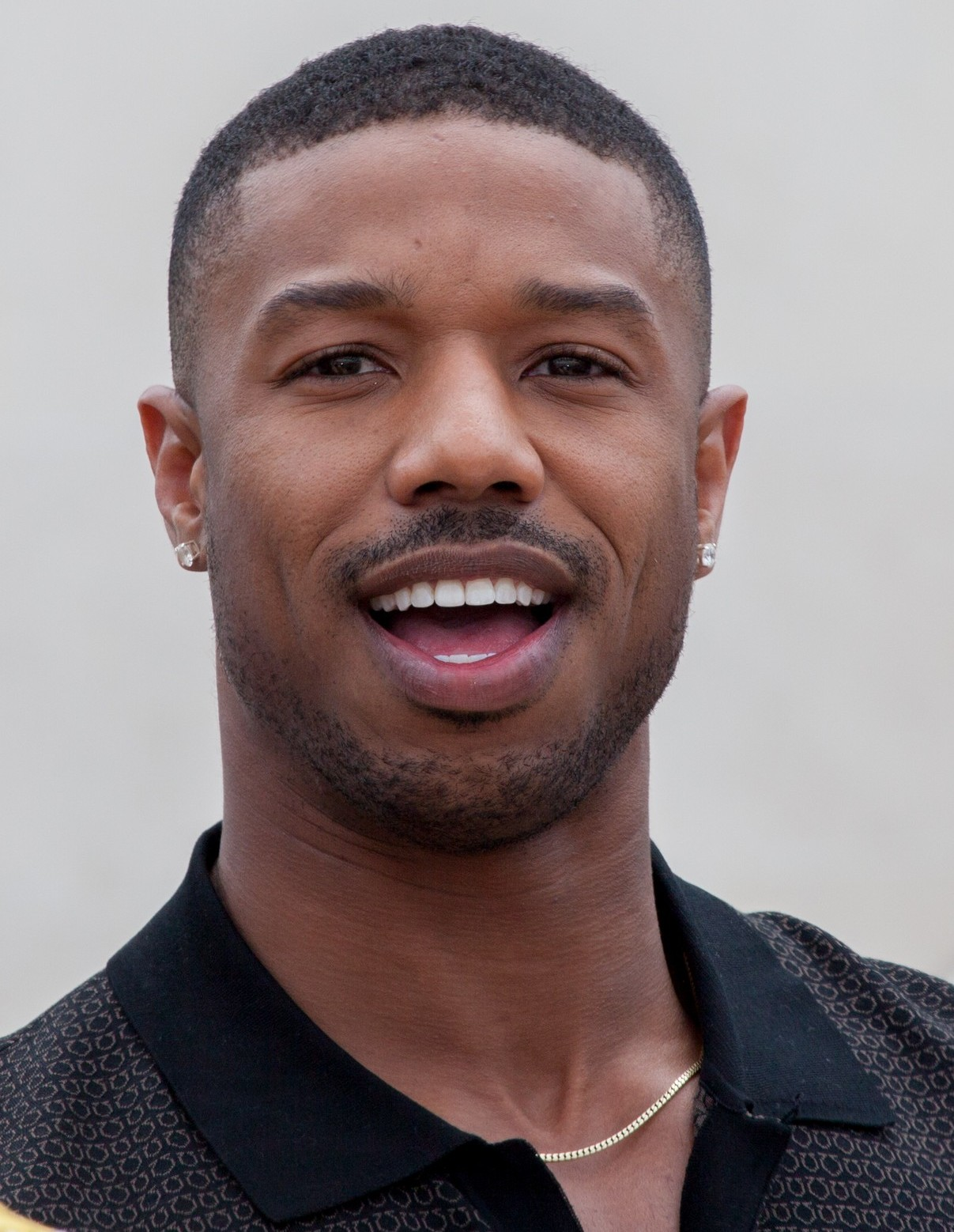
Michael B. Jordan won for Sinners (2025)

=== 2020s ===
Year	Actor	Role(s)	Project(s)	Ref.
2021	Vince Vaughn	The Blissfield Butcher	Freaky	
2021	Sope Dirisu	Bol	His House	
2021	Pyotr Fyodorov	Colonel Semiradov	Sputnik	
2021	Michiel Huisman	Shepherd	The Other Lamb	
2021	Dan Stevens	Charlie	The Rental	
2022	Yahya Abdul-Mateen II	Anthony McCoy	Candyman	
2022	Nicolas Cage	The Janitor	Willy's Wonderland	
2022	Dave Davis	Yakov Ronen	The Vigil	
2022	Vincent Lindon	Vincent	Titane	
2022	Cillian Murphy	Emmett	A Quiet Place Part II	
2022	Sam Richardson	Finn Wheeler	Werewolves Within	
2023	Ralph Fiennes	Chef Julian Slowik	The Menu	
2023	Ethan Hawke	The Grabber	The Black Phone	
2023	Fedja van Huêt	Patrick	Speak No Evil	
2023	Rory Kinnear	Geoffrey	Men	
2023	Justin Long	AJ	Barbarian	
2024	Nicolas Cage	Paul Matthews	Dream Scenario	
2024	Dave Bautista	Leonard	Knock at the Cabin	
2024	Tobin Bell	John Kramer	Saw X	
2024	Joaquin Phoenix	Beau Wassermann	Beau Is Afraid	
2024	Andrew Scott	Adam	All of Us Strangers	
2025	Michael B. Jordan	Elijah "Smoke" Moore / Elias "Stack" Moore	Sinners	
2025	Nicolas Cage	Longlegs	Longlegs	
2025	David Dastmalchian	Jack Delroy	Late Night with the Devil	
2025	Hugh Grant	Mr. Reed	Heretic	
2025	Bill Skarsgård	Count Orlok / Nosferatu	Nosferatu	
2025	Justice Smith	Owen	I Saw the TV Glow	
2026	Ralph Fiennes	Dr. Ian Kelson	28 Years Later: The Bone Temple	
2026	Josh Brolin	Archer Graff	Weapons	
2026	Chiwetel Ejiofor	Clark	Backrooms	
2026	Michael Johnston	Baron "Bear" Bailey	Obsession	
2026	David Jonsson	Peter "Pete" McVries (#23)	The Long Walk	
2026	Jack O'Connell	Sir Lord Jimmy Crystal	28 Years Later: The Bone Temple	
2026	Adam Scott	Ohm Bauman	Hokum	

== Performers with multiple wins ==
2 wins

- Ralph Fiennes

== Performers with multiple nominations ==
3 nominations

- Nicolas Cage

2 nominations

- Ralph Fiennes

== See also ==
- Critics' Choice Super Award for Best Horror Movie
- Critics' Choice Super Award for Best Actress in a Horror Movie
