= Samson (28 Days Later) =

Fictional character from the 28 Days Later franchise

- 28 Days Later character
- Chi Lewis-Parry as Samson in 28 Years Later
- First appearance: 28 Years Later (2025)
- Last appearance: 28 Years Later: The Bone Temple (2026)
- Created by: Alex Garland; Danny Boyle
- Portrayed by: Chi Lewis-Parry
- Status: Alive

In-universe information
- Species: Human (formerly); Infected (partially treated)
- Gender: Male
- Nationality: British

Samson is a fictional character in the 28 Days Later film series, created by Alex Garland and Danny Boyle and portrayed by English actor and stuntman Chi Lewis-Parry.

Introduced in 28 Years Later (2025) as an unusually large and highly aggressive variant of the infected, classified in the film as an "Alpha". Samson later returns as a central character in 28 Years Later: The Bone Temple (2026), where his evolving condition becomes significant to the story's exploration of the rage virus and the possibility of treatment.

== Character biography ==
=== Background ===
Little is known about Samson's life prior to infection. In 28 Years Later: The Bone Temple it is established that he was infected as a child during the original Rage Virus outbreak and survived for decades as an Alpha, a rare class of Infected that has grown larger and more physically dominant over time.

The name "Samson" is given to him by Dr. Ian Kelson, who associates the Alpha's immense size and strength with the Biblical figure of the same name. Kelson administers a mix of drugs to Samson, gradually relieving the symptoms he has carried since being infected as a child during the original outbreak.

=== 28 Years Later ===
Samson is a colossal Infected carrying a mutated form of the rage virus that grants him abnormal strength and durability. Unlike most Infected, he is capable of leading hunting groups and shows limited awareness. He is named by Dr. Ian Kelson due to his size and physical power.

After the sinking of the NATO patrol ship HMS Öresund, Swedish soldiers are driven ashore in Northumberland, where most are killed by Infected. Samson personally kills two of them, while Erik Sundqvist escapes. Samson later catches up to Erik while he is helping Isla and Spike and kills him aboard a train. He then pursues Isla and Spike but is subdued with a morphine dart fired by Kelson.

=== 28 Years Later: The Bone Temple ===
After one of his hunts, Samson returns to the area near the Bone Temple. His actions are not immediately violent. Kelson sedates him with morphine, leaving him in a subdued state. Over time, Kelson observes changes in Samson's behavior. He later takes morphine himself in an attempt to understand its effects. When Samson regains consciousness, he leaves the temple without attacking Kelson. This causes Kelson to believe that the rage virus may not be permanent.

In the weeks that follow, Samson repeatedly allows Kelson to sedate him. He appears drawn to the calm produced by the drug. As Kelson's supply of morphine diminishes, he tells Samson that he intends to euthanize him to prevent further suffering. Before this occurs, Samson speaks the word "moon". Kelson interprets this as a sign that Samson's cognitive abilities are returning.

Samson shows additional behavioral changes, including wearing clothing and showing signs of memory recall. Sometime later, he sits inside a train carriage and speaks about not having a ticket, referencing a memory from childhood. This behavior provokes the other Infected, who attack him. Samson kills them in self-defense.

Samson eventually returns to the Bone Temple and finds Kelson dying from a stab wound inflicted by Jimmy Crystal, a cult leader of the 'Jimmies' or the 'Fingers'. Crystal has been restrained and crucified upside down by Spike and the last surviving Finger. Samson arrives at the Bone Temple, says "thank you" to Kelson after being cured, and then carries his body away. In his delirium, Crystal hallucinates Samson as the Devil.

== Concept and creation ==
Samson is portrayed by English actor and stuntman Chi Lewis-Parry. Lewis-Parry was cast by director Danny Boyle to physically embody what the filmmakers described as the "king of the infected", with Boyle instructing the actor to focus on intimidation and physical presence rather than words, as Samson speaks only with grunts and screams while running around naked and decapitating anyone who crosses his path.

Boyle confirmed that Lewis-Parry wore a prosthetic penis between his legs, just like the other Infected characters. The role required extensive full-body prosthetics, including silicone components that were applied over several hours each filming day. Lewis-Parry stated that the prosthetic suit was typically single-use for full-body shots due to wear and loss of realism after removal. In an interview with Variety, intimacy coordinator Vanessa Coffey explained that she became involved with the film well before the concept of naked Infected was introduced. She described the chaotic infected birth scene as "raw and very realistic" and emphasized the importance of Lewis-Parry, even while wearing his prosthetic, keeping his robe securely closed while moving around off-set. Lewis-Parry described the performance as largely non-verbal, requiring him to communicate emotion, intent, and shifting consciousness through posture, movement, and eye contact, particularly in scenes opposite of actor Ralph Fiennes as Dr. Ian Kelson.

According to Lewis‑Parry, some scenes shared with Fiennes were developed spontaneously on set rather than strictly from the script, and those improvisations were retained in the final cut of 28 Years Later: The Bone Temple. Lewis-Parry has stated that he views Samson as a tragic figure rather than a monster, interpreting the character as someone seeking help and responding to Kelson's kindness as a means of survival beyond violence.

Director Nia DaCosta did not go into detail about what will happen in future installments but called Samson's situation "so interesting". She suggested that whether Samson's recovery is permanent or only partial could be important for the direction of a potential third film.

== Reception ==
Samantha Nelson of Polygon described the character as one of the standout characters of 28 Years Later, describing the "monstrously hung zombie". Clay Pitman of ComicBook.com wrote that Samson's partial cure and the developments in 28 Years Later: The Bone Temple may have made him "the most memorable zombie in movie history", standing out even among the franchise's other infected. Dennis Moiseyev of Phrasemaker praised Samson's storyline, highlighting his journey of being treated and ultimately cured by Kelson. He said the most engaging part was Samson's story with Kelson, showing how he was treated, which made the sequence memorable and also added more background to the series.
