= Sir Alex Ferguson: Never Give In =

- UK theatrical release poster
- Directed by: Jason Ferguson
- Produced by: Andrew Macdonald
- Starring: Alex Ferguson
- Production companies: DNA Films; Passion Pictures
- Distributed by: Universal Pictures; Prime Video
- Release dates: 6 March 2021 (Glasgow Film Festival); 27 May 2021
- Running time: 130 minutes
- Country: United Kingdom
- Language: English

Sir Alex Ferguson: Never Give In is a 2021 British documentary film about the former Scotland, Aberdeen and Manchester United football manager Alex Ferguson.

The documentary recounts Ferguson's life from his early experiences in Govan, through his playing career as a striker at Rangers amongst others, to his long and successful managerial career, using archive footage and interviews with Ferguson that began in 2016, and includes Ferguson's recovery from his 2018 brain haemorrhage.

The documentary helped Ferguson end a long running feud with Gordon Strachan, his former player at Aberdeen and Manchester United, that had begun in the 1980s. The two went out for lunch and buried the hatchet at the urging of Ferguson's son Jason. Strachan appears as a talking head in the film along with 11 other interviewees in total: Ferguson, five family members (Ferguson's wife Cathy Ferguson and their sons, Jason, Mark and Darren along with his brother, Martin Ferguson), two doctors, and Ryan Giggs, Eric Cantona and Archie Knox.

== Production ==
DNA Films and Passion Pictures agreed to co-produce the film. It is produced by BAFTA winner Andrew Macdonald and directed by Alex Ferguson's son Jason.

== Release ==
Sir Alex Ferguson: Never Give In premiered at the 2021 Glasgow Film Festival. Shortly after, Universal Pictures and Amazon Prime Video purchased the distribution rights to the documentary in the United Kingdom. It was released in UK cinemas on 27 May 2021, by Universal and was made available on Prime Video in the UK and Ireland on May 29.
