= Passion Pictures =

British film production company

- Industry: Animation; Film production
- Founded: 1987; 39 years ago
- Founders: Andrew Ruhemann; Alan Dewhurst
- Number of locations: 5 (Note: In London, Melbourne, Paris, Toronto, and New York City.)
- Area served: Worldwide
- Products: Video production Animation; Digital media Motion pictures Documentaries; Commercials
- Brands: PASSION Commercials; PASSION Animation Studios; PASSION Documentaries; PASSION Planet; PASSION Games; PASSION Paris
- Website: passion-pictures.com

Passion Pictures is a British film production company established by Andrew Ruhemann in 1987. The company has studios in London, Melbourne, Paris, Toronto, and New York City.

== Film production ==
The company's core business is in commercial and animation output, which includes work for Cartoon Network, music videos for Gorillaz, and the Compare the Market commercial campaign featuring Aleksandr Orlov (meerkat). Passion Australia produced The Lost Thing, directed by Andrew Ruhemann and Shaun Tan, which won an Academy Award for Best Animated Short Film in 2011.

The department's first film, One Day in September, won an Academy Award in 2000. They have since been involved in the 2013 Oscar-winning Searching for Sugar Man, 2015's Listen to Me Marlon and 2016's Oscar-nominated Pear Cider and Cigarettes.

In 2017, the company produced the Netflix docuseries Five Came Back based on the book by Mark Harris. They also work on 101 Dalmatian Street. Its Passion Planet subsidiary produces nature documentaries such as The Serengeti Rules.

Passion Animation Studios created several promotional cinematic for the computer game League of Legends.

In 2020, Passion Paris placed second at the Berlin Music Video Awards in the Best Animation category for S+C+A+R+R - "The Rest Of My Days" music video. In 2021, the production company received two nominations for Best Animation by the Berlin Music Video Awards, for their work on the music video "I Had To Leave" by S+C+A+R+R and "Moving Men" by MYD. Passion Pictures produced the 2021 documentary Sir Alex Ferguson: Never Give In.

In 2024, Passion Paris worked on a Genshin Impact - themed animated short, named "Moonlit Bamboo Forest", for HoYoverse's HoYoFair program. (Note: The HoYoFair program was created by HoYoverse to showcase fan art and animations made by creators inside and outside the HoYoverse community based on games developed by miHoYo / HoYoverse. These submissions are often featured on HoYoFair's YouTube channel, and some of these submissions have been used to advertise their games in the form of community-driven advertising.) The animated short was later nominated as best sponsored in the 52nd Annie Awards.

== Filmography ==
=== Film ===
| Title | Release date | Distributor | Notes |
|---|---|---|---|
| Project Nim | 8 July 2011 (United States); 12 August 2011 (United Kingdom) | Icon Film Distribution; Roadside Attractions & HBO Documentary Films (United States) | co-production with BBC Films, UK Film Council and Red Box Films |
| The Imposter | 24 August 2012 | Picturehouse Entertainment & Revolver Entertainment; Indomina Releasing (United States) | co-production with Film4 Productions, A&E IndieFilms, Raw and Red Box Films |
| How I Live Now | 4 October 2013 | Entertainment One | co-production with Entertainment One, Film4 Productions, BFI, Protagonist Pictures, Cowboy Films and Prospect Entertainment |
| Mystify: Michael Hutchence | 4 July 2019 (Australia); 18 October 2019 (United Kingdom) | Dogwoof; Madman Entertainment (Australia) | co-production with Ghost Pictures, BBC Music On Screen, Dogwoof, Film Victoria, Madman Entertainment, Screen Australia and Australian Broadcasting Corporation |
| Rising Phoenix | 26 August 2020 | Netflix | co-production with Misfits Entertainment, Ventureland and HTYT Films |
| Sir Alex Ferguson: Never Give In | 27 May 2021 | Universal Pictures | co-production with DNA Films |
| Wham! | 27 June 2023; 5 July 2023 (Worldwide) | Altitude Film Distribution; Netflix | co-production with Ventureland, Nemperor Production and Library Films |
| Super/Man: The Christopher Reeve Story | 21 September 2024 (United States); 1 November 2024 (United Kingdom) | Warner Bros. Pictures | co-production with Misfits Entertainment, Words + Pictures and Jenco Films |
| McCartney: The Hunt for the Lost Bass | 2 April 2026 | | co-production with BBC, Fremantle, Footprint and Dartmouth Films |

=== Television ===
| Title | Years | Network | Notes |
|---|---|---|---|
| Rocket & Groot | 2017 | Disney XD | co-production with Marvel Animation |
| Ant-Man | 2017 | Disney XD | co-production with Marvel Animation |
| 101 Dalmatian Street | 2019–2020 | Disney Channel UK | co-production with Disney Branded Television |
| Lego City Adventures | 2019–2022 | Nickelodeon/Netflix/YouTube | co-production with The Lego Group and Axis Studios (seasons 1–2) |
| Lego Friends: The Next Chapter | 2023–present | YouTube | co-production with The Lego Group and Superprod Animation |
