= 28 Years Later: The Bone Temple =

2026 film by Nia DaCosta

- Theatrical release poster
- Directed by: Nia DaCosta
- Written by: Alex Garland
- Produced by: Andrew Macdonald; Peter Rice; Bernie Bellew; Danny Boyle; Alex Garland
- Starring: Ralph Fiennes; Jack O'Connell; Alfie Williams; Erin Kellyman; Chi Lewis-Parry
- Cinematography: Sean Bobbitt
- Edited by: Jake Roberts
- Music by: Hildur Guðnadóttir
- Production companies: Columbia Pictures; Decibel Films; DNA Films
- Distributed by: Sony Pictures Releasing
- Release dates: 13 January 2026 (United Kingdom); 16 January 2026 (United States)
- Running time: 109 minutes
- Countries: United Kingdom; United States
- Language: English
- Budget: $63 million
- Box office: $58.5 million

28 Years Later: The Bone Temple is a 2026 post-apocalyptic horror film directed by Nia DaCosta and written by Alex Garland. It is the direct sequel to 28 Years Later (2025) and the fourth instalment in the 28 Days Later film series. It stars Ralph Fiennes, Jack O'Connell, Alfie Williams, Erin Kellyman, and Chi Lewis-Parry. The film follows Spike as he is initiated into "Sir Lord" Jimmy Crystal's satanic cult while Dr Ian Kelson makes an unexpected connection with Samson, an Alpha Infected.

In April 2024, DaCosta was reportedly in negotiations to direct a sequel to 28 Years Later, which would be the second part of a planned trilogy, with Danny Boyle, Garland, Andrew Macdonald, Peter Rice, and Bernie Bellew attached as producers; Cillian Murphy remains executive producer. The film was shot back-to-back with its predecessor.

The Bone Temple was released by Sony Pictures Releasing through its Columbia Pictures label in the United Kingdom on 13 January 2026, as part of a double bill with 28 Years Later. It received a separate release the following day and was released in the United States on 16 January. The film received critical acclaim, becoming the best-reviewed film in the series, but underperformed at the box office, grossing $58.5 million worldwide against a $63 million budget.

== Plot ==
After being rescued by the Fingers, a gang led by the psychopathic Satan worshipper, "Sir Lord" Jimmy Crystal, (Note: As depicted in 28 Years Later (2025)) Spike is forced to kill Jimmy Shite in a death match, as an initiation. Sir Jimmy then renames the young boy "Jimmy" to match the other Fingers, who include the slightly empathetic Jimmy Ink, and the deranged, sadistic Jimmima.

Dr Ian Kelson, who covers his skin in iodine solution to protect himself from the virus, continues to build up the Bone Temple, an ossuary for those killed in the Rage Virus epidemic, while the Alpha Infected, Samson, repeatedly visits him. Kelson deduces that Samson is becoming addicted to the morphine from his blowgun, deliberately allowing himself to be drugged. Samson no longer attacks Kelson, and the two develop a human connection as his humanity begins to resurface.

The Fingers raid a farm inhabited by survivors, including Tom and his pregnant sister, Cathy. From a distance, Jimmy Ink catches sight of the Bone Temple, and Kelson dancing with Samson. In a barn, Cathy hides as Sir Jimmy orders the Fingers to skin the captured survivors alive as a sacrifice to Old Nick, claiming that Satan is his father.

Running low on morphine, Kelson prepares to euthanise Samson, but is overjoyed when Samson says his first word, "moon", suggesting that the Rage Virus may be treatable. Meanwhile, Jimmy Ink, who is growing disillusioned with Sir Jimmy, takes pity on Spike and protects him. Sir Jimmy offers Tom a place in the gang if he can win a death match against a Finger, but Tom is outmatched by his opponent, Jimmima. Cathy breaks her cover to kill Jimmima and Tom sets the barn on fire with a propane tank, killing one of the Fingers before being killed. Sir Jimmy sends Spike to capture Cathy; Spike, traumatised, begs her to take him with her, but Cathy does not trust him, and escapes.

With the gang's numbers and morale low, Sir Jimmy threatens to kill Spike for his failure to capture Cathy, but Ink suggests they visit Kelson — who she assumes is Old Nick, having mistaken the iodine for red skin, and Samson as a demon — and let him decide Spike's fate. At the Bone Temple, Sir Jimmy meets Kelson alone and threatens to kill him if Kelson does not pose as Satan and substantiate Sir Jimmy's leadership over the Fingers.

The next morning, Spike tries to leave Sir Jimmy's camp, but is confronted by Jimmy Fox, who attempts to kill him to avenge Jimmy Shite's death. Ink kills Fox and brings Spike back. Kelson fears that his research on Samson will be cut short and, in a premature attempt to grant him peace, administers him a cocktail of antipsychotics and other drugs, hypothesising that the Rage Virus causes aggression indirectly via psychotic hallucinations. Experiencing some clarity, Samson visits the abandoned train where he hallucinates a childhood memory. When he speaks normally again, a pack of infected attack him; now immune to reinfection, Samson overpowers and kills them all.

That night, Kelson complies with Sir Jimmy's demands, impersonating Satan in a pyrotechnic-filled performance of Iron Maiden's "The Number of the Beast" while exposing the gang to hallucinogens. Upon recognising Spike, Kelson betrays Sir Jimmy by ordering the Fingers to crucify him. Sir Jimmy fatally stabs Kelson, and Ink is forced to kill the other two Fingers in self-defence. Spike stabs Sir Jimmy, before comforting the dying Kelson. Ink crucifies Sir Jimmy on an inverted cross. Spike and Ink, whose real name is Kellie, leave the Bone Temple. Samson arrives and greets Kelson by name, thanking him as Kelson succumbs to his wounds. Samson carries his body away. After hallucinating Samson as the devil, Sir Jimmy is attacked by an infected.

Some time later, Spike and Kellie are attempting to escape a group of infected, unaware that they are being observed by Jim, a survivor of the initial outbreak of the Rage Virus, (Note: As depicted in 28 Days Later (2002)) and his teenage daughter, Sam, who break off a history lesson about postwar Europe to go to their aid.

== Cast ==
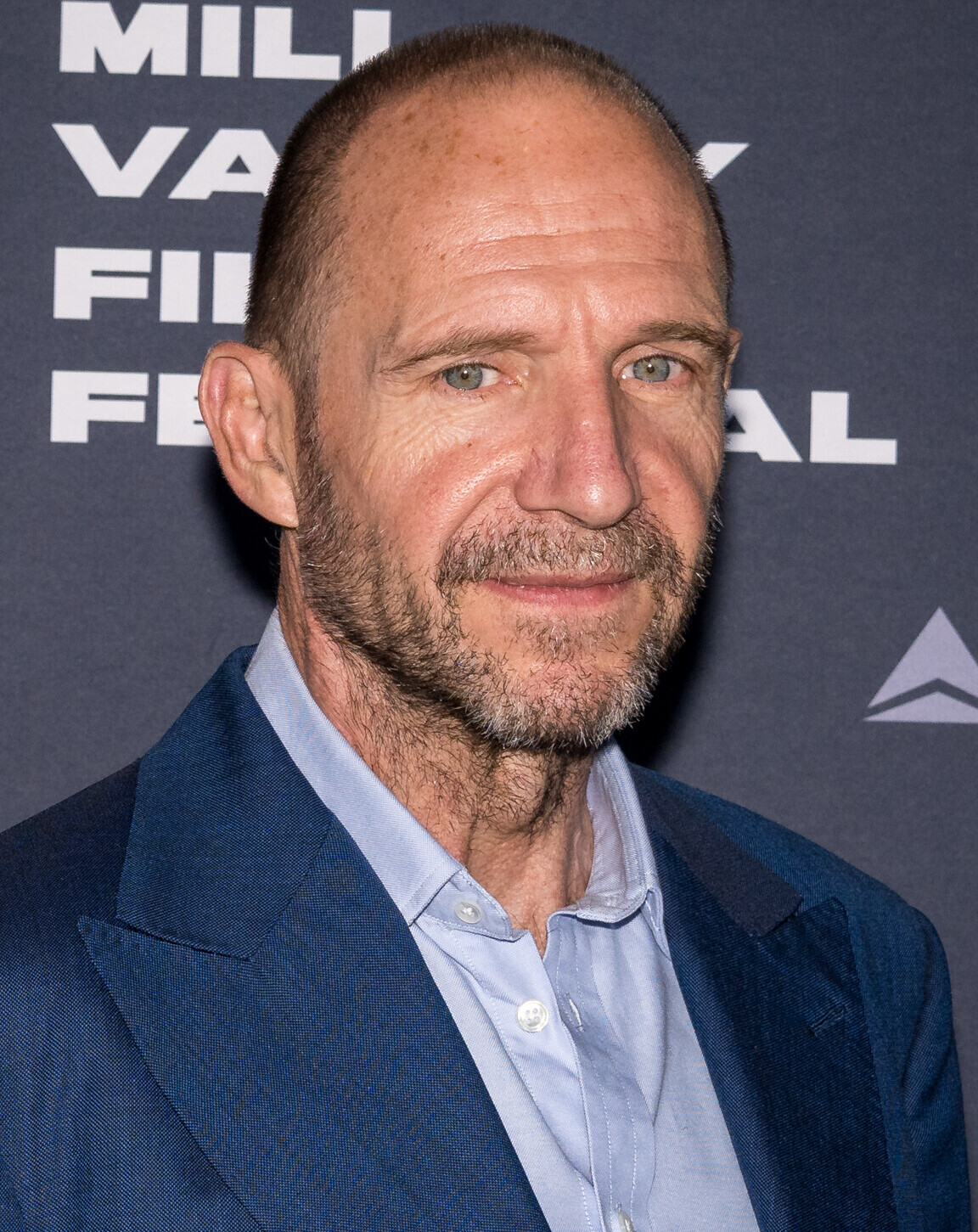
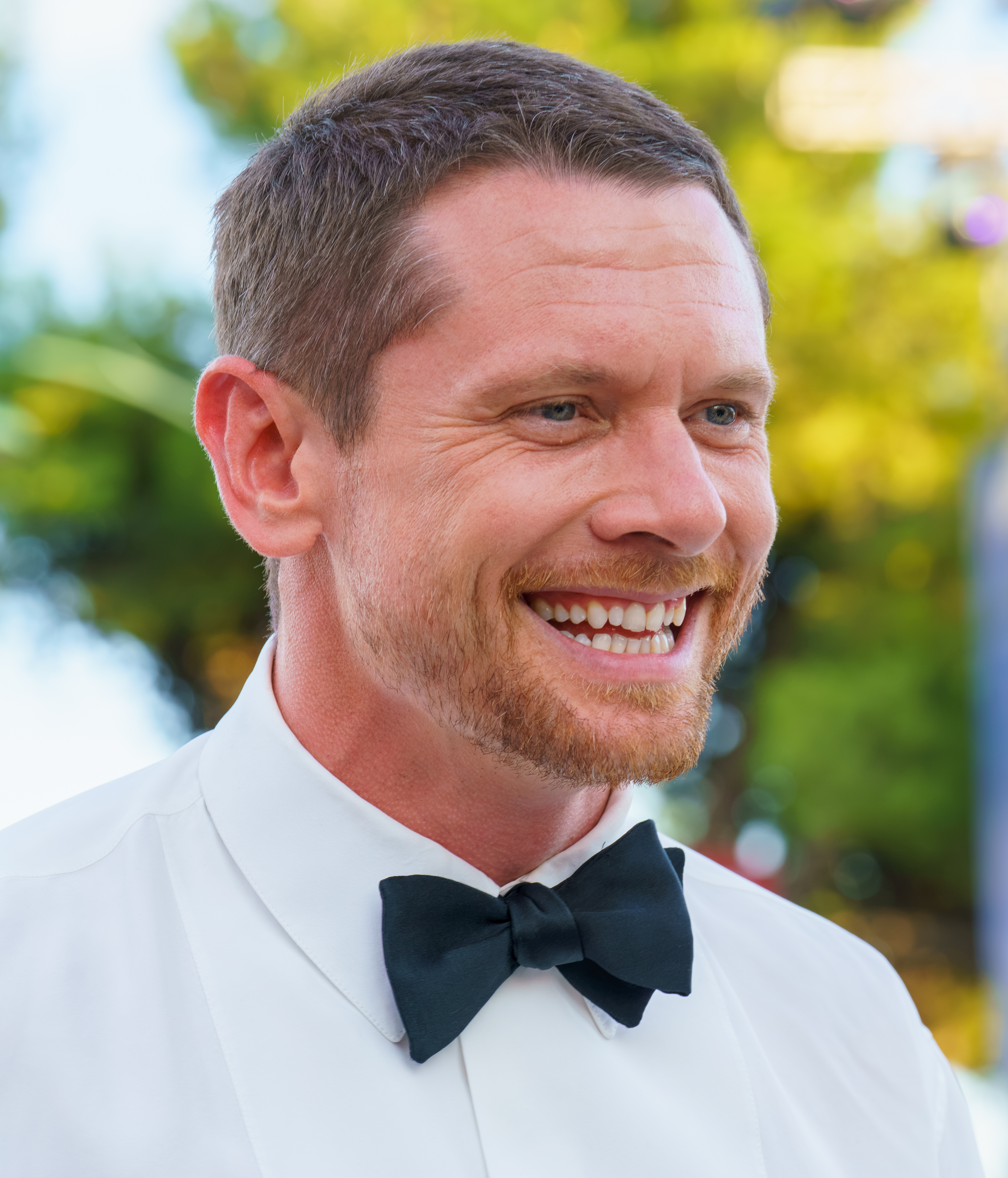
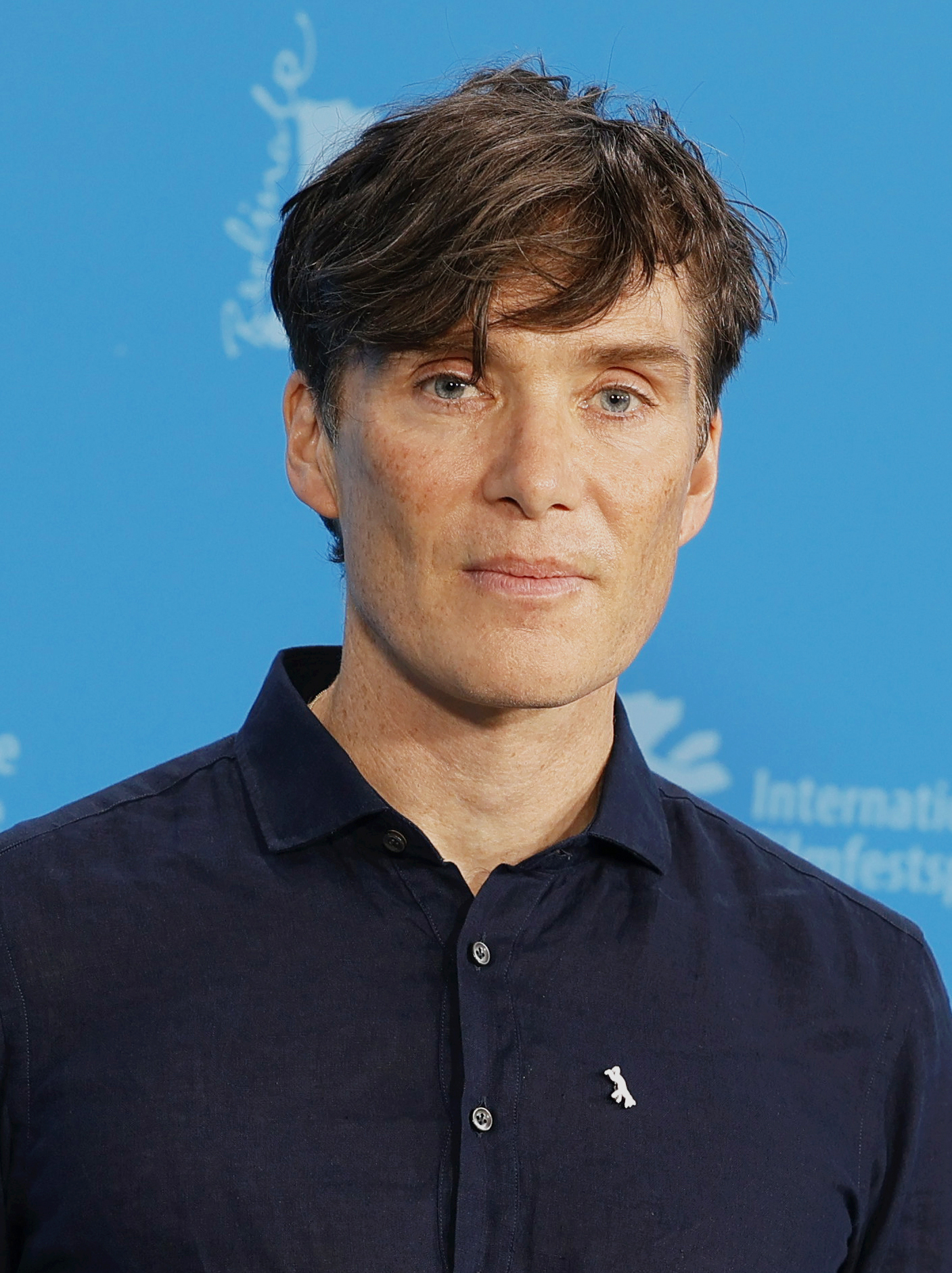
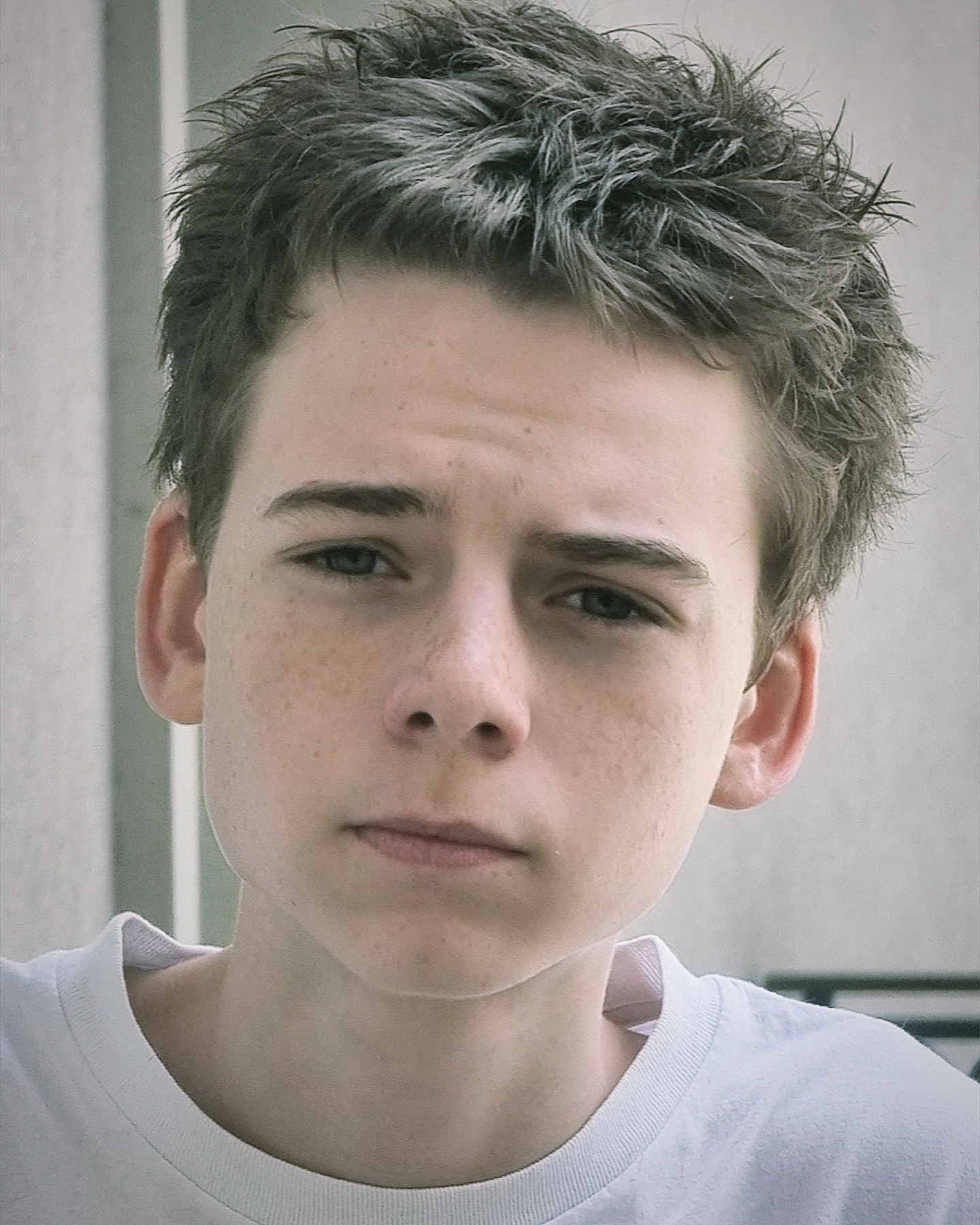
Clockwise from top left: Ralph Fiennes, Jack O'Connell, and Alfie Williams return from 28 Years Later, while Cillian Murphy returns from 28 Days Later.
- Ralph Fiennes as Dr Ian Kelson, a former GP dedicated to memorialising the victims of the epidemic.
- Jack O'Connell as Sir Lord Jimmy Crystal, a psychopathic gang leader who styles himself and his gang after Jimmy Savile.
- Alfie Williams as Spike, a boy who is on a personal quest on the mainland.
- Erin Kellyman as Jimmy Ink / Kellie, a tattooed member of the Fingers, who befriends Spike.
- Chi Lewis-Parry as 'Samson', a physically imposing Alpha leader of the infected.
- Emma Laird as Jimmima, a sadistic member of the Fingers.
- Sam Locke as Jimmy Fox, one of the Fingers who is close with Jimmy Shite.
- Robert Rhodes as Jimmy Jimmy, a scarred member of the Fingers.
- Ghazi Al Ruffai as Jimmy Snake, a skinny member of the Fingers.
- Maura Bird as Jimmy Jones, a non-binary member of the Fingers.
- Connor Newall as Jimmy Shite, a large member of the Fingers.
- Louis Ashbourne Serkis as Tom, a male survivor.
- Mirren Mack as Cathy, a pregnant survivor.
- David Sterne as George, a male survivor.

Executive producer Cillian Murphy makes an uncredited cameo appearance as Jim, a former bicycle courier and survivor of the original outbreak. Murphy reprises his role from 28 Days Later, with his appearance in The Bone Temple's ending serving as his character's reintroduction which sets up the planned fifth film. Sam, Jim's daughter, is portrayed by Maiya Eastmond.

== Production ==
=== Development ===
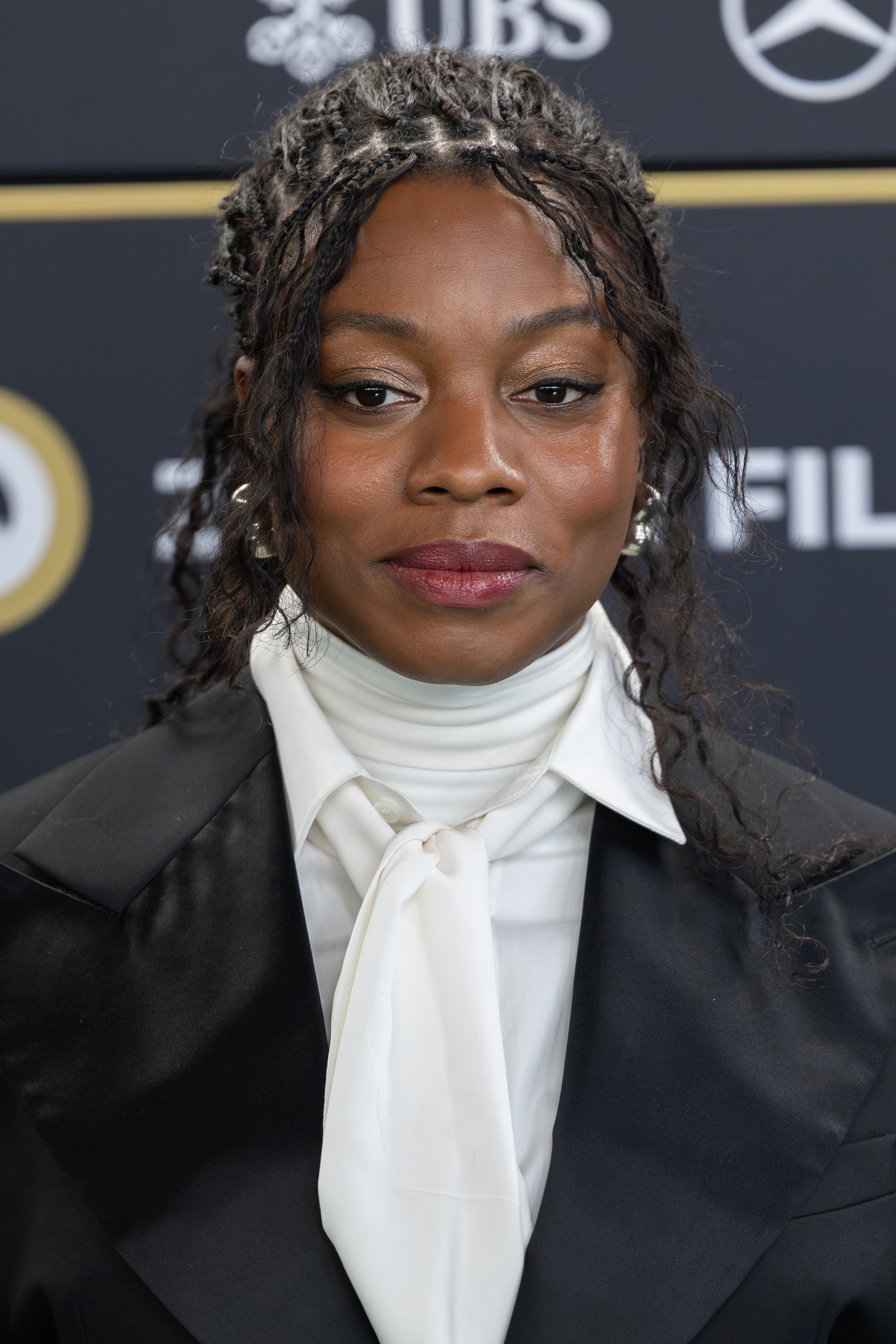
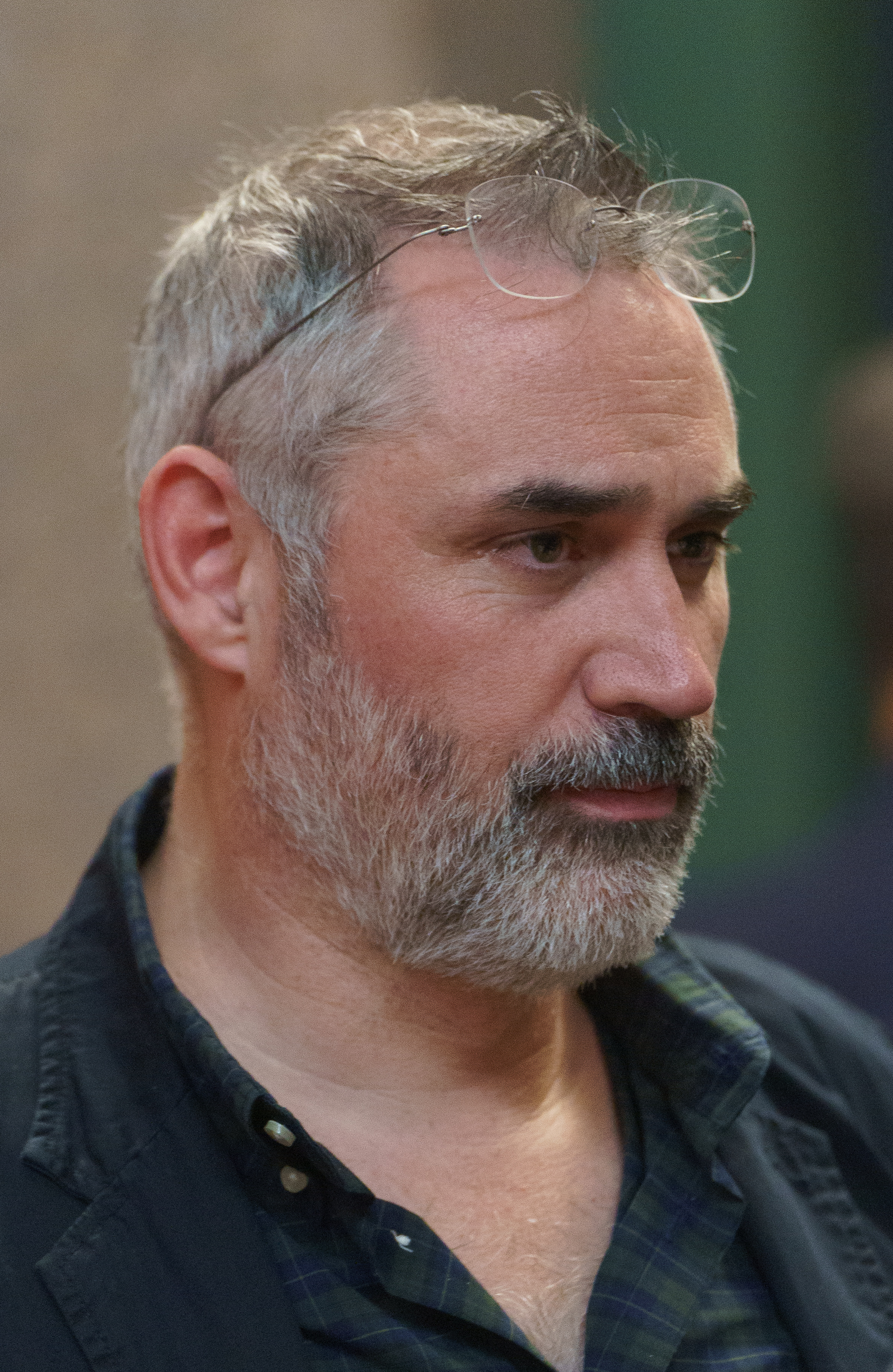
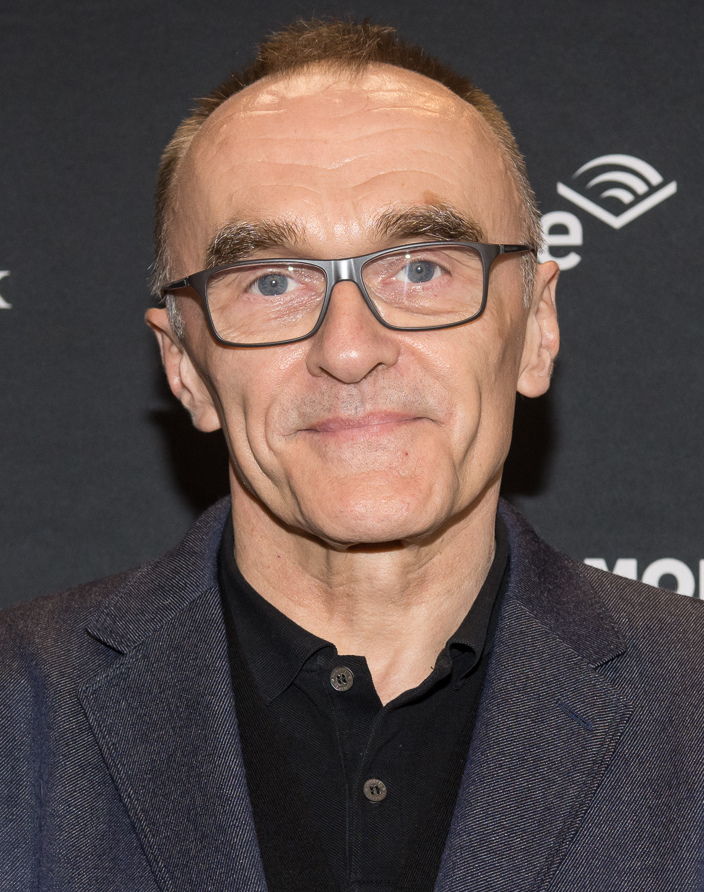
Counterclockwise from top: Nia DaCosta directed 28 Years Later: The Bone Temple, with Alex Garland returning as screenwriter. Danny Boyle, who directed 28 Days Later and 28 Years Later, served as a producer on the sequel.

In April 2024, a sequel to 28 Years Later (2025) was reportedly in development, with Nia DaCosta in talks to direct, taking over from Danny Boyle, and Alex Garland returning to write the screenplay. In June 2024, via a copyright filing, the title was seemingly revealed as 28 Years Later Part II: The Bone Temple.

Feeling "protective of the legacy" of the franchise, Nia DaCosta's pitch was to avoid copying Danny Boyle's directorial style to instead create a personal and idiosyncratic work, and requested Alex Garland have more infected added to the script. Though Boyle and Garland oversaw the film, they allowed DaCosta creative freedom and did not interfere with her directing process. In December 2024, Aaron Taylor-Johnson said his character would not return for this film. DaCosta collaborated with Boyle in creating the character Samson during the development of the previous film, as the character features prominently in The Bone Temple.

The sequel continued collaborations with key production partners from the previous film: produced by Columbia Pictures in association with Decibel Films and DNA Films, distributed by Sony Pictures Releasing, and executive producers including Danny Boyle, Andrew Macdonald, Peter Rice, and Bernie Bellew. TSG Entertainment covered half of the $63 million net budget, of which a collective $15 million went to Danny Boyle, Alex Garland, and producer Peter Rice, while Sony spent an additional $70 million on marketing.

Ralph Fiennes said the film explores themes juxtaposing human violence with innate humanity amid brutality and the infected. DaCosta stated that while the theme of the previous film was about the nature of family, The Bone Temple would be about the nature of evil, which would lead the next film to be about the nature of redemption.

=== Filming ===
Principal photography began on 19 August 2024, with Sean Bobbitt serving as cinematographer, replacing Anthony Dod Mantle from the previous film. As filming began approximately three weeks after the completion of the preceding film, production required logistical coordination due to overlapping characters and locations, including casting decisions for characters appearing in both films. In September 2024, Cillian Murphy was spotted filming in Ennerdale, Cumbria with a crew reportedly attached. The Bone Temple set was constructed in Redmire, North Yorkshire and the opening scene set in an abandoned leisure centre was filmed at the Richard Dunn Sports Centre in Bradford which has been closed since 2019.

According to Ralph Fiennes, while Danny Boyle's direction in the preceding film was instinctive and fast-paced with a clear vision of desired moments, Nia DaCosta's approach was more deliberate and meticulous, particularly in close-up shots, allowing actors additional time to develop subtle aspects of their performances. In contrast to the previous film being filmed on iPhone 15 Pro cameras, The Bone Temple was filmed using the Arri Alexa 35 digital camera.

Chi Lewis-Parry reprised his role as the Alpha infected Samson, portraying the character as having a more subdued demeanour due to frequent sedation by Fiennes's Dr Ian Kelson. A scene in which Kelson and Samson dance to Duran Duran's Rio was not part of the original script but instead was improvised during filming. To portray Samson, Chi Lewis-Parry wore a full-body prosthetic body suit. Each suit took seven artists six to eight hours to apply and could only be used once, so the process had to be repeated more than 25 times during filming. For close-up or waist-up shots, simpler partial prosthetics were used.

=== Music ===
Hildur Guðnadóttir created the musical score, having previously collaborated with DaCosta on Hedda (2025). The ending scene and credits feature the theme song "In the House - In a Heartbeat", originally composed by John Murphy for 28 Days Later.

=== Post-production ===
Post-production on 28 Years Later: The Bone Temple commenced following the completion of principal photography in late 2024, with the 13 January 2026, release date allowing an extended period for editing and visual effects to be completed ahead of its theatrical debut. Visual effects work was overseen by Adam Gascoyne as Visual Effects Supervisor, with Dean Koonjul and Rob Vassieamong the key VFX leads and coordinated through effects vendor Union VFX.

== Release ==
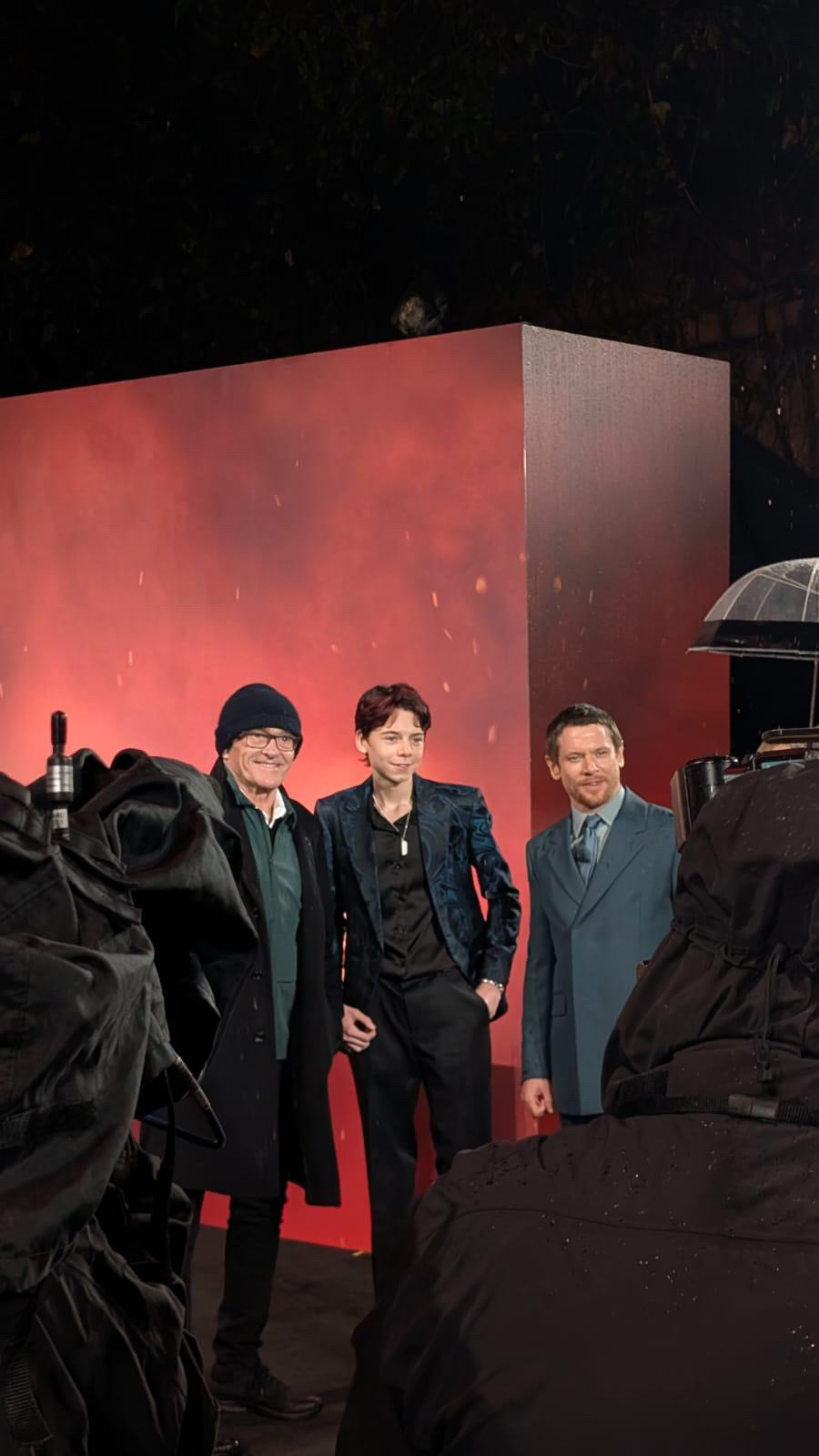
Producer Danny Boyle with actors Alfie Williams and Jack O'Connell at the premiere of 28 Years Later: The Bone Temple in London, 13 January 2026

28 Years Later: The Bone Temple was first released in the United Kingdom by Sony Pictures Releasing through its Columbia Pictures label on 13 January 2026 as part of a double bill with 28 Years Later, before being released individually the following day on 14 January. The film was released in the United States on 16 January 2026.

The film was released on digital platforms by Sony Pictures Home Entertainment on 17 February 2026 and was released on 4K Ultra HD Blu-ray, Blu-ray, and DVD on 21 April 2026.

== Reception ==
=== Box office ===
28 Years Later: The Bone Temple grossed $25.1 million in the United States and Canada, and $33.4 million in other territories, for a worldwide total of $58.5 million.

In the United States and Canada, The Bone Temple was initially expected to make $20–22 million over the four-day Martin Luther King Jr. Day holiday weekend. However, it underperformed in the United States, earning $13 million over the three-day weekend and an estimated $15 million over the four-day holiday period. This represented a weaker US domestic opening compared to its predecessor 28 Years Later, which debuted to $30 million over a traditional three-day weekend.

=== Critical response ===
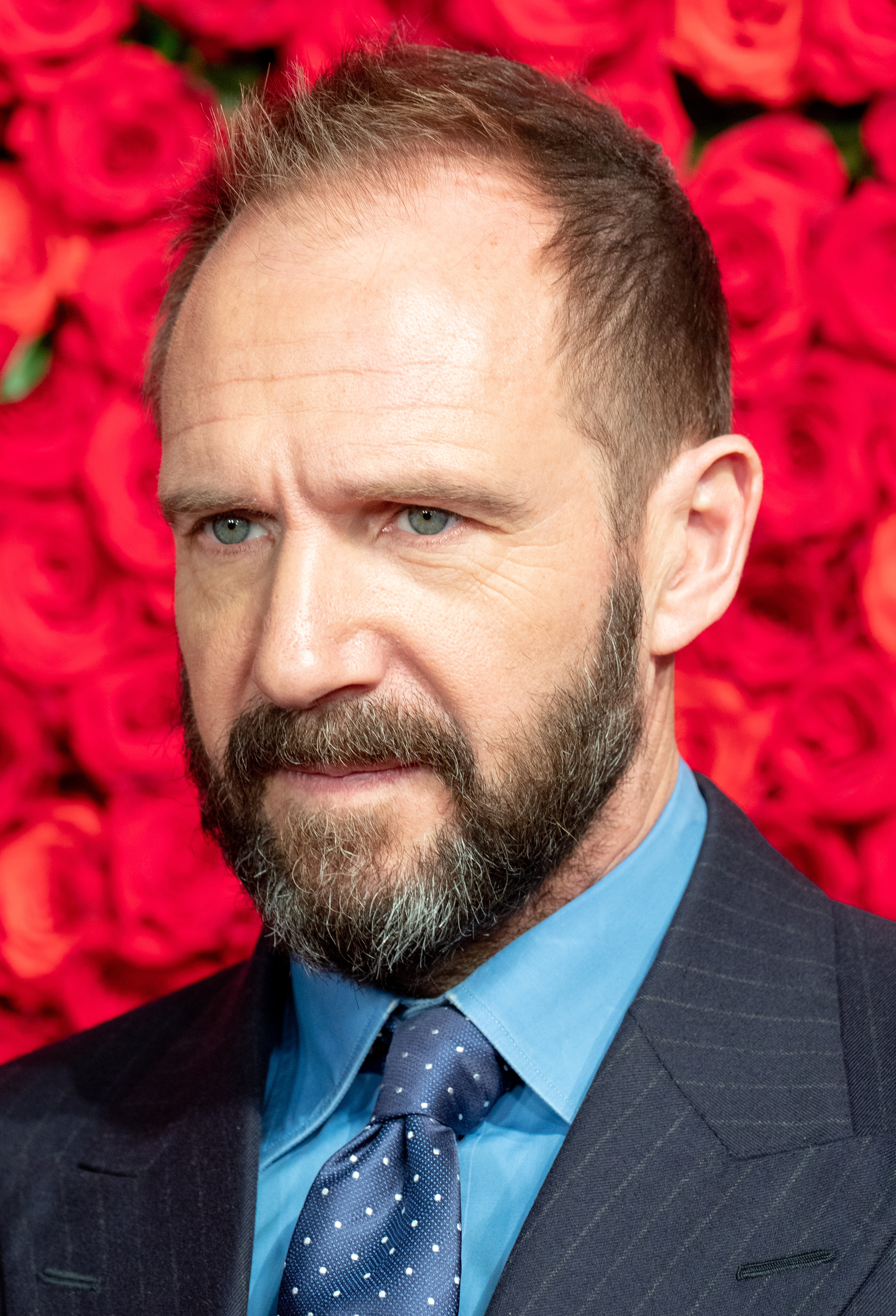
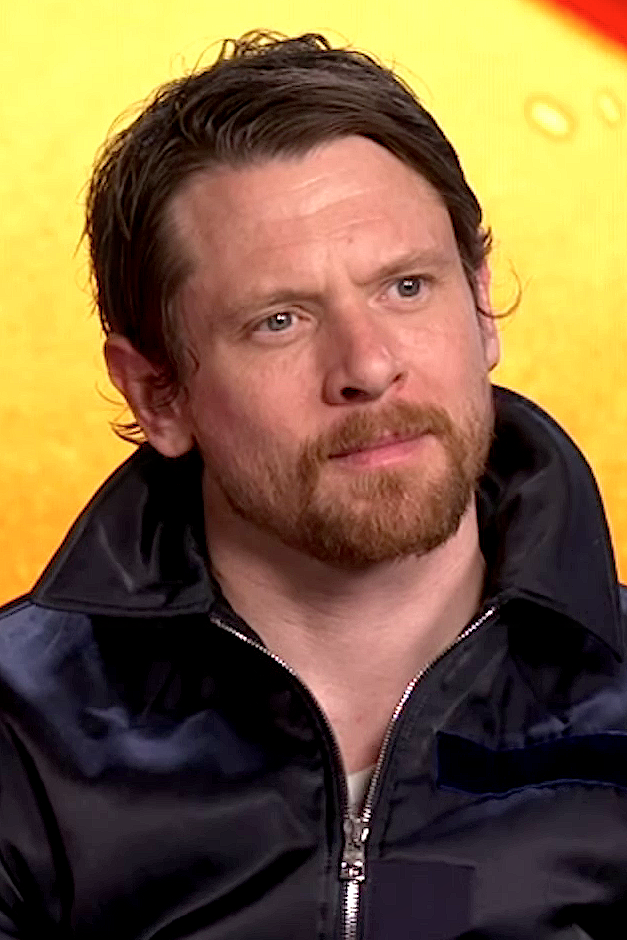
The performances of Ralph Fiennes and Jack O'Connell were praised by critics.

On the review aggregator website Rotten Tomatoes, 91% of 348 critics' reviews are positive, with an average rating of 7.8/10. The website's consensus reads: "A direct continuation of 28 Years Later that ups the gore while deepening the dread, The Bone Temple is finely adorned by Nia DaCosta's unnerving direction as well as Ralph Fiennes and Jack O'Connell's inspired performances." Metacritic, which uses a weighted average, assigned the film a score of 81 out of 100, based on 58 critics, indicating "universal acclaim". Audiences polled by CinemaScore gave it an average grade of "A−" on an A+ to F scale, up from its predecessor's "B" grade. Audiences surveyed by PostTrak gave it an average rating of 4.5 out of 5 stars, with 72% saying that they would definitely recommend it.

Amy Nicholson of Los Angeles Times wrote: "Gruesomely both low and highbrow, it's the movie equivalent of Jell-O wrestling an anthropology professor at Burning Man, which may have been the inspiration of one of its standout characters, Ralph Fiennes' spry and mesmerising Dr Ian Kelson."

Nicholas Barber and Caryn James of the BBC wrote: "The Bone Temple delivers all of the gore and terror you want from a zombie film, but it's wonderfully idiosyncratic, too" and named it one of the best films of 2026.

=== Accolades ===
Award	Date of ceremony	Category	Recipient(s)	Result	Ref.
Astra Midseason Movie Awards	30 June 2026	Best Picture	28 Years Later: The Bone Temple	Nominated	
Astra Midseason Movie Awards	30 June 2026	Best Director	Nia DaCosta	Nominated	
Astra Midseason Movie Awards	30 June 2026	Best Actor	Ralph Fiennes	Nominated	
Astra Midseason Movie Awards	30 June 2026	Best Supporting Actor	Jack O'Connell	Nominated	
Astra Midseason Movie Awards	30 June 2026	Best Screenplay	Alex Garland	Nominated	
Astra Midseason Movie Awards	30 June 2026	Best Horror	28 Years Later: The Bone Temple	Nominated	
Critics' Choice Super Awards	6 August 2026	Best Horror Movie	28 Years Later: The Bone Temple	Nominated	
Critics' Choice Super Awards	6 August 2026	Best Actor in a Horror Movie	Ralph Fiennes	Won	
Critics' Choice Super Awards	6 August 2026	Best Actor in a Horror Movie	Jack O'Connell	Nominated	
Fangoria Chainsaw Awards	25 October 2026	Best Wide Release	28 Years Later: The Bone Temple	Nominated	
Fangoria Chainsaw Awards	25 October 2026	Best Director	Nia DaCosta	Nominated	
Fangoria Chainsaw Awards	25 October 2026	Best Lead Performance	Ralph Fiennes	Nominated	
Fangoria Chainsaw Awards	25 October 2026	Best Supporting Performance	Jack O'Connell	Nominated	
Fangoria Chainsaw Awards	25 October 2026	Best Screenplay	Alex Garland	Nominated	
Fangoria Chainsaw Awards	25 October 2026	Best Cinematography	Sean Bobbitt	Nominated	
Fangoria Chainsaw Awards	25 October 2026	Best Costume Design	Carson McColl and Gareth Pugh	Nominated	
Fangoria Chainsaw Awards	25 October 2026	Best Makeup FX	John Nolan	Nominated	
Fangoria Chainsaw Awards	25 October 2026	Best Score	Hildur Guðnadóttir	Nominated	
World Soundtrack Awards	10 October 2026	Film Composer of the Year	Hildur Guðnadóttir (Note: Also for The Bride! (2026) and Hedda (2025))	Nominated	

== Future ==
The Bone Temple was announced as the second part of a planned trilogy, with Garland writing all three. In January 2025, Boyle confirmed that he would direct the final film in the trilogy. In June 2025, Boyle stated of the third film: "It's outlined...The overall arc is outlined, but we've got to raise the money first. And that will depend on how the first film performs." That September, Murphy said that the third film would only be produced if the second was a success. That December, it was reported that Sony was moving forward with a potential third instalment prior to the theatrical release, with Murphy in talks to reprise his role as Jim, and Garland writing. In May 2026, Boyle stated that the shooting of the third film was planned to commence, but said "We ran out of time. Because it's set in an area of Britain you can only film at certain times of the year. We ran out of time this year...it'll be, hopefully, fingers crossed, next year." Boyle later confirmed in October that same year that the film was "on the back burner" due to a struggle to secure funding and scheduling conflicts with Garland. Boyle told Deadline that Garland has "written a fantastic script, so we’ve got to raise the money to make it." Boyle said that the proposed final film in the trilogy "does complete the story in a beautiful, mathematically perfect way in which the circle is closed...So let's hope it all comes together."
