= Chi Lewis-Parry =

English actor, stuntman, and athlete (born 1983)

- Born: 10 August 1983 (age 43); Hitchin, Hertfordshire, England
- Other name: Chopper
- Occupations: Actor, basketball player, kickboxer, mixed martial artist, stunt performer
- Known for: Chai (London) “Take Me Out” series 2
- Martial arts career
- Height: 6 ft 9 in (206 cm)
- Weight: 243 lb (110 kg; 17 st 5 lb)
- Division: Heavyweight
- Team: American Kickboxing Academy

Mixed martial arts record
- Total: 13
- Wins: 9
- By knockout: 7
- By submission: 2
- Losses: 0
- Draws: 2
- No contests: 2

Other information
- Mixed martial arts record from Sherdog

Chi Lewis-Parry (born 10 August 1983) is an English actor, stunt performer, professional mixed martial artist and kickboxer, and former professional basketball player. He is best known for his appearance in “Take Me Out” as Chai (London) in series 2.

== Career ==
=== Acting ===
Lewis-Parry portrayed Stone "Negative Dude" in the 2025 remake of The Running Man and appeared as a stunt actor in Kraven the Hunter.

Lewis-Parry gained widespread attention after being cast in Danny Boyle's 28 Years Later, a long-awaited installment in the 28 Days Later franchise, as Samson, the Alpha of the infected. He reprised the role in the film's sequel, 28 Years Later: The Bone Temple, for which his performance opposite Ralph Fiennes received critical acclaim. In both films, Lewis-Parry also received attention for appearing in numerous fully nude scenes with the use of a large penis prosthetic.

== Mixed martial arts record ==
Professional record breakdown
13 matches	9 wins	0 losses
By knockout	7	0
By submission	2	0
Draws	2	
No contests	2	

Chi Lewis-Parry mixed martial arts record
Res.	Record	Opponent	Method	Event	Date	Round	Time	Location	Notes
Win	9–0–2 (2)	Fabio Maldonado	KO (elbows)	UAE Warriors 13	25 September 2020	1	1:08		
Win	8–0–2 (2)	Mahmoud Hassan	KO (punch)	UAE Warriors 7	5 July 2019	1	0:08		
Draw	7–0–2 (2)	Lukasz Parobiec	Draw	ROC 7: Rise of Champions 7	2 March 2019	3	5:00		
Win	7–0–1 (2)	Ibrahim Elsawi	TKO (punches)	ADW: Abu Dhabi Warriors 5	26 January 2019	2	2:50		
Draw	6–0–1 (2)	Lukasz Parobiec	Draw (Majority)	BAMMA 36: McKee vs. Brazier	28 June 2018	3	5:00		
NC	6–0 (2)	Stav Economou	No Contest (illegal elbows)	BAMMA 34: Lohore vs. Brazier	9 March 2018	1	1:36		
Win	6–0 (1)	Alain Ngalani	KO (elbows)	ONE FC: War of Dragons	11 July 2014	1	4:07		
NC	5–0 (1)	Alain Ngalani	No Contest (accidental knee to groin)	ONE FC: Honor and Glory	30 May 2014	1	N/A		
Win	5–0	Stephen Lambert	TKO (punchws)	HS: Heat Sports 2	7 December 2013	1	3:50		
Win	4–0	Arkadiusz Dorocki	Submission (guillotine choke)	Kayo MMA 10	7 September 2013	1	0:17		
Win	3–0	David Gregory	Submission (kneebar)	CSMMA: Colosseum Sports Challengers 2	9 June 2013	1	2:25		
Win	2–0	Nikki Kent	KO (knee)	DFS: Dynamite Fight Series 4	17 March 2013	1	0:08		
Win	1–0	Ollie Beard	TKO (punches)	UCMMA 26: The Real Deal	4 February 2012	2	1:29		
