= 9th Astra Midseason Movie Awards =

Astra Midseason Movie Awards

- Date: June 30, 2026
- Official website: theastras.com

Highlights
- Best Picture: Project Hail Mary
- Most awards: The Invite / Michael / Obsession / Project Hail Mary (2)
- Most nominations: Project Hail Mary (7)

The winners of the 9th Astra Midseason Movie Awards, presented by the Hollywood Creative Alliance, were announced on June 30, 2026.

The nominations were announced on June 26, 2026. Project Hail Mary led the nominations with seven (receiving recognition in every category for which it was eligible), followed by 28 Years Later: The Bone Temple with six, and Backrooms, The Invite and Obsession with five each.

Project Hail Mary won Best Picture and Best Director, while The Invite, Michael and Obsession also won two awards each.

All films considered and nominated were released between January 1 and June 26, 2026.

== Winners and nominees ==
Winners are listed first and highlighted with boldface

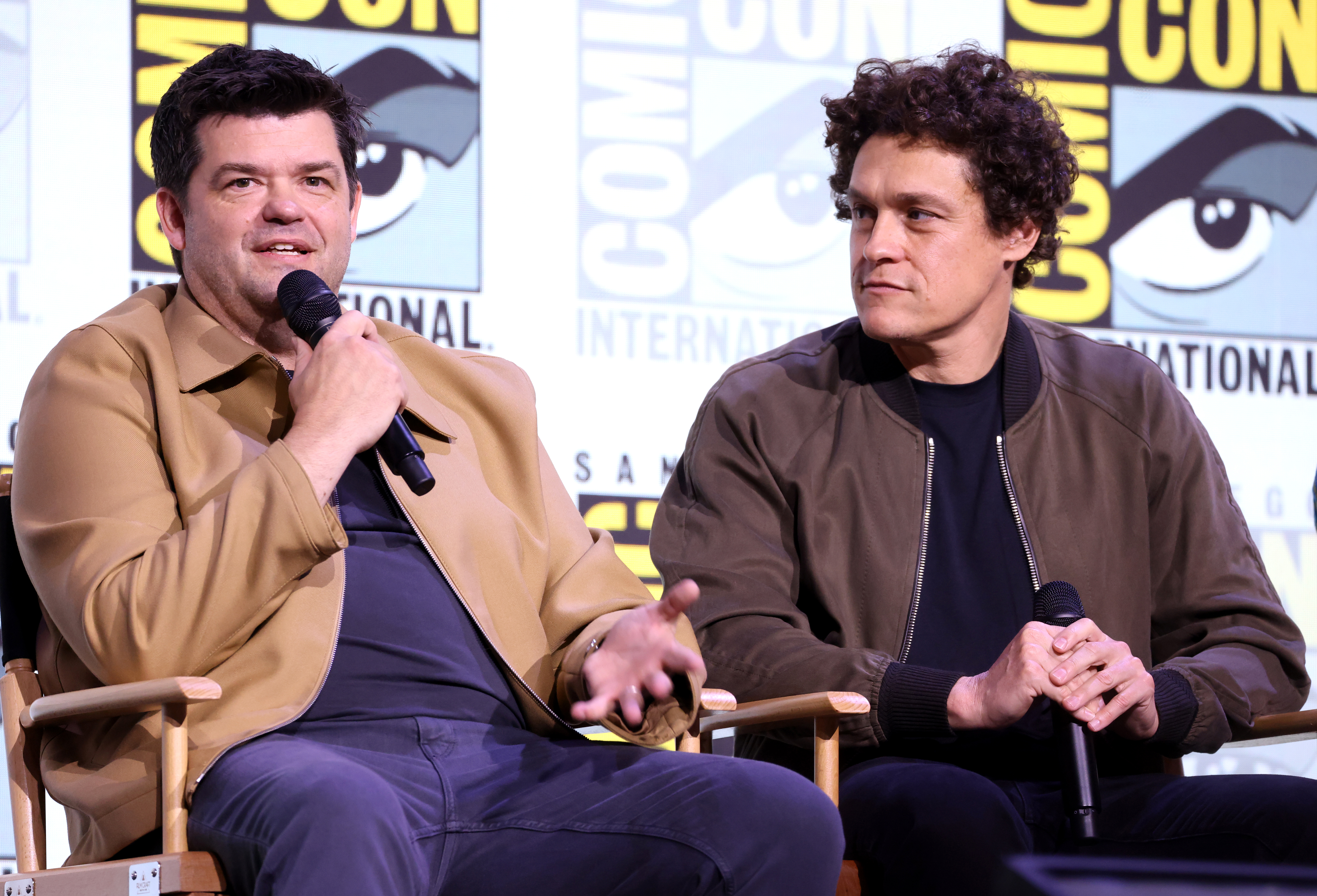
Phil Lord and Christopher Miller, Best Director winners

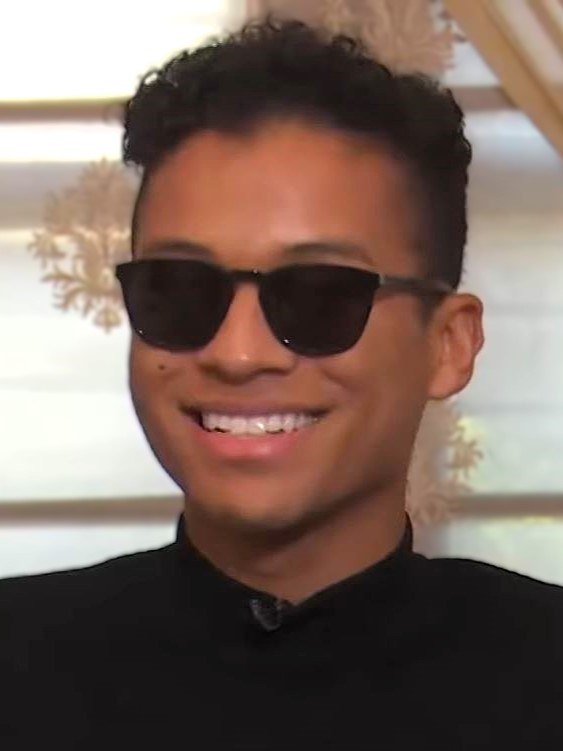
Jaafar Jackson, Best Actor winner

Inde Navarrette, Best Actress winner

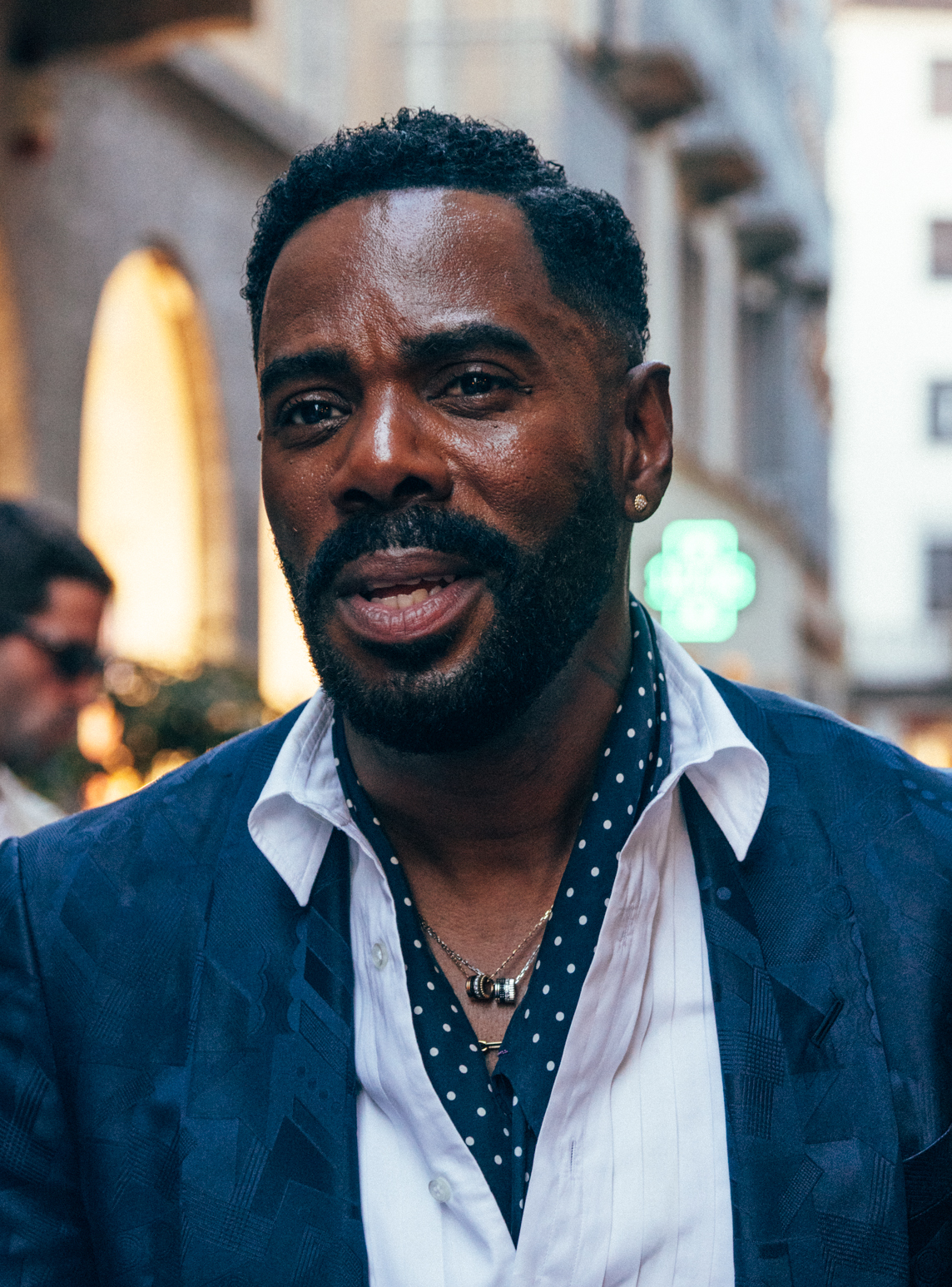
Colman Domingo, Best Supporting Actor winner

Penélope Cruz, Best Supporting Actress winner

**Best Picture**: **Project Hail Mary**; Runner-up: The Invite; 28 Years Later: The Bone Temple; Backrooms; Disclosure Day; The Drama; Nirvanna the Band the Show the Movie; Obsession; Send Help; Toy Story 5	**Best Director**: **Phil Lord and Christopher Miller – Project Hail Mary**; Runner-up: Curry Barker – Obsession; Nia DaCosta – 28 Years Later: The Bone Temple; Matt Johnson – Nirvanna the Band the Show the Movie; Kane Parsons – Backrooms; Olivia Wilde – The Invite
**Best Actor**: **Jaafar Jackson – Michael as Michael Jackson**; Runner-up: Ryan Gosling – Project Hail Mary as Ryland Grace; Chiwetel Ejiofor – Backrooms as Clark; Ralph Fiennes – 28 Years Later: The Bone Temple as Dr. Ian Kelson; Robert Pattinson – The Drama as Charlie Thompson; Leo Woodall – Tuner as Niki White	**Best Actress**: **Inde Navarrette – Obsession as Nikki Freeman**; Runner-up: Emily Blunt – Disclosure Day as Margaret Fairchild; Rachel McAdams – Send Help as Linda Liddle; Keke Palmer – I Love Boosters as Corvette; Margot Robbie – Wuthering Heights as Catherine "Cathy" Earnshaw; Zendaya – The Drama as Emma Harwood
**Best Supporting Actor**: **Colman Domingo – Michael as Joe Jackson**; Runner-up: Edward Norton – The Invite as Hawk; Dustin Hoffman – Tuner as Harry Horowitz; Dylan O'Brien – Send Help as Bradley Preston; Jack O'Connell – 28 Years Later: The Bone Temple as Sir Lord Jimmy Crystal; James Ortiz – Project Hail Mary as Rocky	**Best Supporting Actress**: **Penélope Cruz – The Invite as Piña**; Runner-up: Sandra Hüller – Project Hail Mary as Eva Stratt; Emily Blunt – The Devil Wears Prada 2 as Emily Charlton; Courtney Grace – Disclosure Day as NBC Anchor; Alison Oliver – Wuthering Heights as Isabella Linton; Renate Reinsve – Backrooms as Dr. Mary Kline
**Best Screenplay**: **Will McCormack and Rashida Jones – The Invite**; Runner-up: Curry Barker – Obsession; Kristoffer Borgli – The Drama; Alex Garland – 28 Years Later: The Bone Temple; Drew Goddard – Project Hail Mary; Andrew Stanton and Kenna Harris – Toy Story 5	**Best Horror**: **Obsession**; Runner-up: Backrooms; 28 Years Later: The Bone Temple; Hokum; Ready or Not 2: Here I Come; Send Help
**Best Indie**: **Leviticus**; Runner-up: Tuner; Blue Heron; Carolina Caroline; Mile End Kicks; Our Hero, Balthazar	**Best Stunts**: **The Furious**; Runner-up: Mortal Kombat II; Disclosure Day; Masters of the Universe; Project Hail Mary; They Will Kill You
**Most Anticipated Film**: **The Odyssey**; Runner-up: Avengers: Doomsday; Digger; Dune: Part Three; The Social Reckoning; Spider-Man: Brand New Day

== Films with multiple awards ==
The following films received multiple awards:

Wins	Film
2	The Invite
2	Michael
2	Obsession
2	Project Hail Mary

== Films with multiple nominations ==
The following films received multiple nominations:

Nominations	Film
7	Project Hail Mary
6	28 Years Later: The Bone Temple
5	Backrooms
5	The Invite
5	Obsession
4	Disclosure Day
4	The Drama
4	Send Help
3	Tuner
2	Michael
2	Nirvanna the Band the Show the Movie
2	Toy Story 5
2	Wuthering Heights
