= Sam Locke (actor) =

Welsh actor

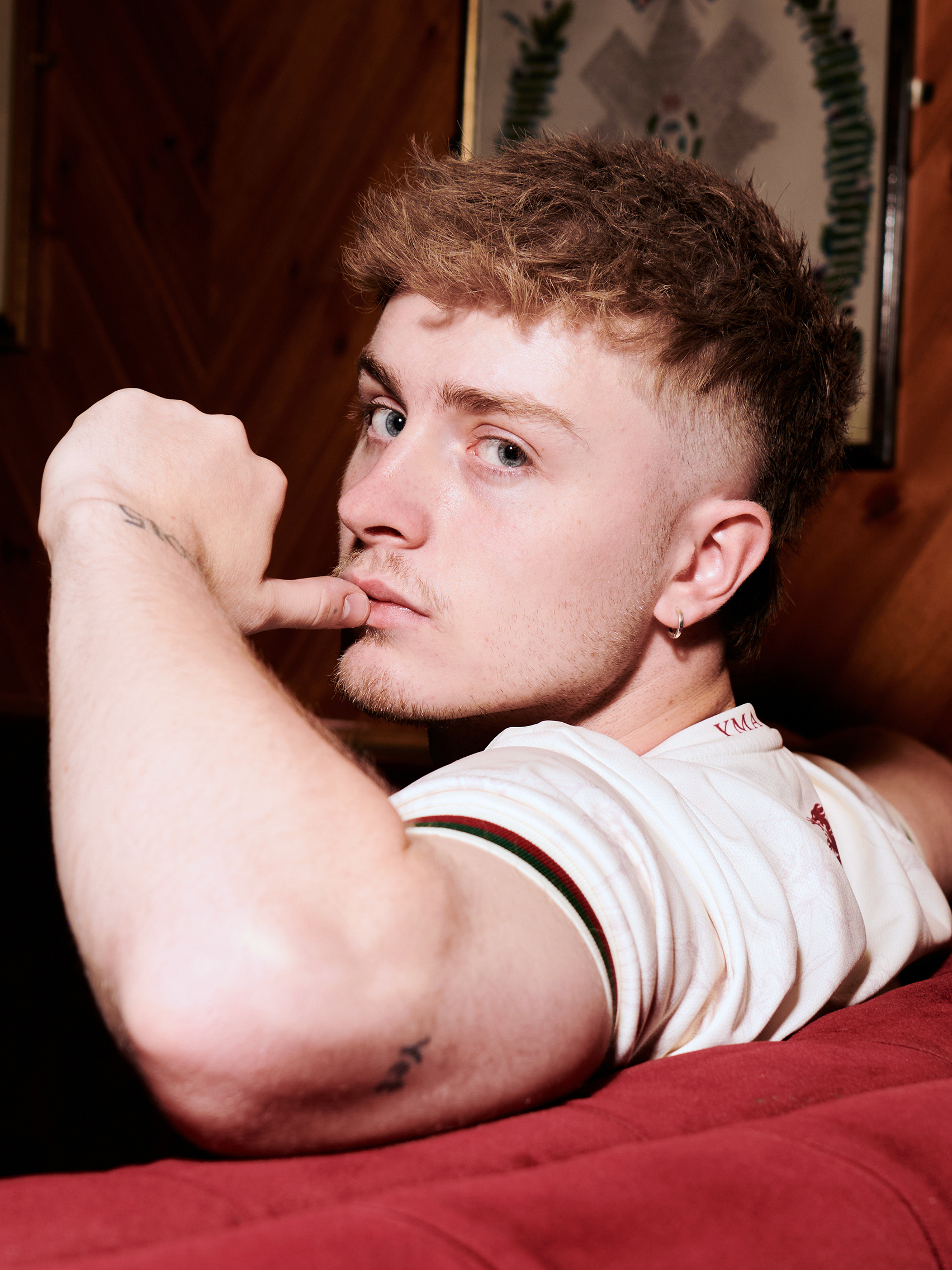
- Sam Locke in 2025
- Born: 12 April 2001 (age 25); Merthyr Tydfil, Wales
- Occupation: Actor
- Years active: 2022–present
- Notable work: Itopia, The Way, 28 Years Later, 28 Years Later: The Bone Temple

Sam Locke (born 12 April 2001) is a Welsh actor. He is best known for his feature film debut in Danny Boyle's 2025 horror sequel 28 Years Later and its 2026 follow-up 28 Years Later: The Bone Temple. He previously appeared in the BBC drama The Way and the sci-fi series Itopia.

== Early life and education ==
Locke was born in Merthyr Tydfil, South Wales. He studied performing arts at Merthyr College and later at De Montfort University in Leicester, graduating in 2023. He began acting in short films and student productions before being cast in professional television roles.

== Career ==
Locke's early television work includes the BBC One drama The Way, directed by Michael Sheen, and the series Itopia. He was also featured in the Welsh short film State of Love and Trust.

In 2024, he recorded a self-tape audition assisted by his grandmother for a role in Danny Boyle's sequel 28 Years Later, which led to his casting in the film. In an interview with SFX Magazine, Locke described his experience on the film as physically demanding, involving weeks of stunt training and high-intensity action scenes. He praised Boyle's direction and the collaborative atmosphere on set. His character in the film, named Jimmy Fox, was part of a new group of survivors led by Jack O'Connell's character Jimmy Crystal. Locke spoke to WalesOnline in June 2025, noting the physically demanding nature of the shoot and his long-standing interest in acting, which began during his school years in Merthyr Tydfil.

Following 28 Years Later, Locke reprised his role in the sequel 28 Years Later: The Bone Temple, directed by Nia DaCosta. It was filmed back-to-back with the previous film, and released in January 2026.

== Filmography ==
=== Film ===
- 28 Years Later (2025)
- 28 Years Later: The Bone Temple (2026)

=== Television ===
- Itopia (2023)
- The Way (2024)
