= Heartlands (film) =

2002 British film by Damien O'Donnell

- Directed by: Damien O'Donnell
- Written by: Paul Fraser
- Produced by: Richard Jobson, Gina Carter
- Starring: Michael Sheen; Mark Addy; Mark Strong; Celia Imrie; Ruth Jones; James Corden
- Edited by: Fran Parker
- Production companies: Miramax Films; DNA Films
- Distributed by: Buena Vista International
- Release dates: 20 August 2002 (Edinburgh Film Festival); 27 August 2003
- Running time: 90 minutes
- Country: United Kingdom
- Language: English

Heartlands is a 2002 film directed by Damien O'Donnell and written by Paul Fraser. It is a comedy-drama-road movie, running at 90 minutes, produced in the United Kingdom. It was screened at the Edinburgh Film Festival.

== Plot ==
Colin is a mild mannered newsagent who plays on his local darts team in the evenings. One night, he discovers his wife, Sandra, has been unfaithful with the dart team's captain, Geoff. When Colin confronts his wife about the affair, they have an argument and she leaves him. The darts team is going to a Regional finals in Blackpool, but Geoff drops Colin from the team and takes Sandra with him.

Colin's best friend, Zippy, advises him that if he does nothing, he will one day look back with regret. Motivated by this advice, Colin resolves to travel to Blackpool and express his love to his wife. He entrusts his newsagent shop to his loyal customers and embarks on his journey.

His first stop-off is at a motorway cafe, where he tries to strike up a conversation with a waitress, but his clumsy attempts at small talk are ignored.

In the evening, he heads into a biker pub. He chats with landlord, Ron, and his barmaid, Mandy. He also talks to one of the bikers, Ian, who challenges him to a game of darts. Colin then joins Ian and his girlfriend for a few drinks in the makeshift campsite at the back of the pub, and Ian persuades Colin to allow him to cut his hair. Colin attends a performance at the pub by English folk singer Kate Rusby. Colin spends the rest of the evening entertaining his new friends with darts stories of his hero, Eric Bristow, and toothbrush juggling around the campfire. When he wakes the next day, his new friends are gone, leaving a photo as a memento.

Taking a break to stretch his legs he meets an eco-warrior chained to a tree, and shares a cheese sandwich. Later he happens on a group of girl guides and spends a few hours in their company. He has a heart to heart with the guide leader, Sonja, explaining how he gave his wife everything she ever wanted, yet it was not enough. He heads up a highway, pulling in at a fork in the road. He climbs off his bike to check the map, and his moped is crushed under the wheels of a speeding lorry.

While walking along the road, he is passed by Ron, who is taking Mandy to Blackpool for a dirty weekend. She brought her daughter along with her, seeing this weekend as more of an opportunity to get away with her kid. In Blackpool, Ron asks Colin to return the favour of the lift by taking the kid out of the way for a few hours. Ron chats up the hotel receptionist, so Colin takes Mandy and her daughter out for a stroll.

The three of them have fun at a fair. Come evening, Colin says he needs to go find his friends. As he is walking around the town, he sees his wife. Colin runs in the opposite direction and spends the night on a sea front bench. The next day he goes to the darts finals.

He finds Geoff having an argument with the opposing team, which deteriorates into a brawl. He asks Sandra if she would mind stepping out for a chat, and despite Geoff trying to stop her, she agrees. She tearfully confesses her regret and that she no longer wants to be involved with Geoff. She realizes that she has been very stupid, and is looking for forgiveness. Colin tells her that though he loves her, he does not want to go back to his old life, wishing to continue experiencing the wider world. He offers her the newsagent and wishes her well.

Colin walks past a cafe and nods a hello to his hero, Eric Bristow, who nods in return. Colin gets a new moped, and gets back on the road. Mandy and her daughter wave at Colin from a bus.

== Cast ==
- Michael Sheen – Colin
- Mark Addy – Ron
- Mark Strong - Ian
- Jim Carter – Geoff
- Celia Imrie – Sonja
- Ruth Jones – Mandy
- Phillipa Peak – Sarah
- Jane Robbins – Sandra
- Paul Shane – Zippy
- Joseph Dempsie – Craig
- James Corden - Shady
