= 28 Weeks Later (soundtrack) =

28 Weeks Later: Original Motion Picture Soundtrack

Soundtrack album by John Murphy
- Released: June 12, 2007 (original); June 2, 2009 (limited ed.)
- Genre: Soundtrack
- Length: 50:28
- Label: Fox Music
- Producers: John Murphy & Michael Gerhard

John Murphy chronology
Basic Instinct 2 (2006)	28 Weeks Later: Original Motion Picture Soundtrack (2007)	Sunshine (2008)

28 Weeks Later: Original Motion Picture Soundtrack is the accompanying soundtrack album composed by John Murphy, for the 2007 film of the same name. It was exclusively released to the iTunes Store on 12 June 2007. It was released by La-La Land Records and Fox Music in CD format on the 2 June 2009 as a limited edition, of which only 1500 copies were made, which included an interview with composer John Murphy as the final track.

== iTunes track listing ==
All tracks are written by John Murphy.

No.	Title	Length
1.	"28 Theme"	3:57
2.	"Welcome to Britain"	2:25
3.	"Helicopter Chase"	1:41
4.	"Fire-bombing London"	2:38
5.	"Theme 1"	1:53
6.	"Walk to Regents Park"	2:54
7.	"Kiss of Death"	2:53
8.	"Don Abandons Alice"	2:59
9.	"London Deserted"	2:24
10.	"Go Go Go!"	2:10
11.	"Theme 2"	2:33
12.	"Knock Knock - Cottage Attack"	2:30
13.	"Night Watch"	1:56
14.	"Code Red"	2:29
15.	"Going Home"	2:38
16.	"Tammy Kills Her Dad"	2:20
17.	"Crowd Breaks Out"	1:48
18.	"Outbreak"	3:06
19.	"Leaving England"	2:36
20.	"End Credits (Theme 3)"	2:38

== 2009 La-La Land Records Album ==
No.	Title	Length
1.	"Cottage Attack"	2:34
2.	"28 Theme"	3:31
3.	"Welcome to Britain"	2:25
4.	"Firebombing London"	2:35
5.	"London Deserted"	2:23
6.	"Kiss of Death"	2:52
7.	"Scooter Through London"	3:16
8.	"Going Home"	2:37
9.	"Alice is Alive!"	2:23
10.	"Don Abandons Alice"	2:57
11.	"Night Watch"	1:56
12.	"Go Go Go!"	2:10
13.	"Code Red"	2:30
14.	"Walk to Regents Park"	2:53
15.	"Outbreak"	3:06
16.	"Crowd Break Out"	1:49
17.	"The Depot"	3:17
18.	"Helicopter Mayhem"	4:27
19.	"Andy's Theme"	1:53
20.	"Underground"	3:35
21.	"Leaving England"	2:37
22.	"Hymn to England"	2:38
23.	"John Murphy Interview"	13:08
