= Andrew Macdonald (producer) =

Scottish–Hungarian film producer

- Born: January 1966 (age 60); Scotland
- Education: Glenalmond College
- Occupation: Film producer
- Spouse: Rachael Fleming
- Children: 5
- Relatives: Kevin Macdonald (brother); Emeric Pressburger (grandfather)

Andrew Macdonald (born January 1966) is a Scottish film producer, best known for his collaborations with director Danny Boyle on films including Shallow Grave (1994), Trainspotting (1996), The Beach (2000) and 28 Days Later (2002). He has also frequently collaborated with screenwriter John Hodge and writer-director Alex Garland.

== Early life ==
Macdonald is the brother of Oscar-winning documentary maker Kevin Macdonald. His maternal grandparents were English actress Wendy Orme and Hungarian-born British Jewish Oscar-winning filmmaker Emeric Pressburger. After Brexit, Macdonald and his brother Kevin gained Hungarian citizenship through their relation to their maternal grandfather.

== Career ==
Together with Duncan Kenworthy, he is the founder of DNA Films, the production company responsible for The Parole Officer (2001), 28 Days Later (2002), Sunshine (2007), 28 Weeks Later (2007), 28 Years Later (2025), three of which Danny Boyle directed and four of which Alex Garland wrote. He also produced Garland's directorial debut Ex Machina.

== Filmography ==
=== Film ===
Producer

- Shallow Grave (1994)
- Trainspotting (1996)
- A Life Less Ordinary (1997)
- The Beach (2000)
- The Parole Officer (2001)
- 28 Days Later (2002)
- Sunshine (2007)
- 28 Weeks Later (2007)
- Never Let Me Go (2010)
- Dredd (2012)
- Sunshine on Leith (2013)
- Ex Machina (2015)
- Far from the Madding Crowd (2015)
- T2 Trainspotting (2017)
- Annihilation (2018)
- Men (2022)
- Civil War (2024)
- Warfare (2025)
- 28 Years Later (2025)
- 28 Years Later: The Bone Temple (2026)
- Elden Ring (2028)

Executive producer

- Twin Town (1997)
- Beautiful Creatures (2000) (Uncredited)
- Strictly Sinatra (2001)
- Heartlands (2002)
- The Final Curtain (2002)
- The Last King of Scotland (2006)
- The History Boys (2006)
- The Sweeney (2012)

Special thanks

- Separate Lies (2005)
- Agora (2009)

As an actor

Year	Film	Role	Notes
1996	Trainspotting	Flat Buyer	Uncredited

=== Television ===
Producer

- The Making of an Englishman (1995) (Documentary)
- Hitler's Warriors (1998) (Documentary)

Executive Producer

- Devs (2020)
- Black Narcissus (2020)
- Shōgun (2024)
