= Peter Rice (executive) =

British businessman (born 1966)

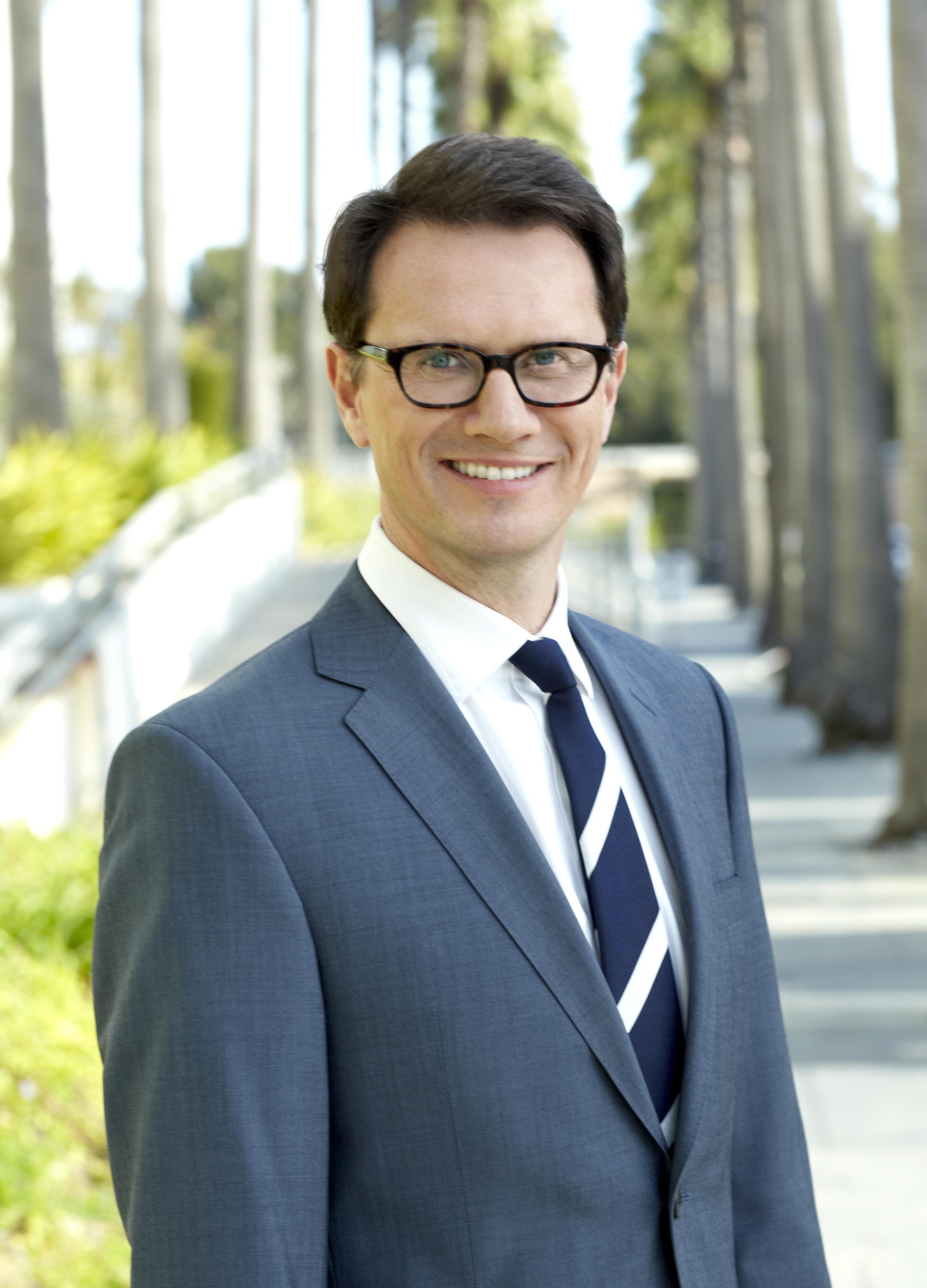
- Born: 1966 (age 59–60); United Kingdom
- Education: University of Nottingham
- Occupation: Media proprietor

Peter Rice (born 1966) is a British American media executive and television producer serving as chief content officer (CCO) of Netflix, Inc. since 2026.

He joined 20th Century Fox in 1989 and was later named president of its former parent company, 21st Century Fox, just before its acquisition by the Walt Disney Company. He then served as chairman of Walt Disney Television (later Disney General Entertainment Content and now Disney Entertainment Television) until he was ousted by former CEO Bob Chapek in 2022.

== Early life ==
Rice was born and raised in the United Kingdom. He earned a degree from the University of Nottingham in 1989.

== Career ==
=== Fox ===
Rice began his career at Twentieth Century Fox in 1989, working for Tom Sherak, then head of U.S. distribution and marketing for Fox Filmed Entertainment. In 2000, Rice became President of Fox Searchlight Pictures, beginning in 2000. From 2007 to 2008, he also oversaw Fox Atomic, which created comedy and genre films, including Turistas and 28 Weeks Later. Fox Atomic was closed in 2009, after Rice moved to Fox's television business.

Rice became chairman and CEO of Fox Networks Group in 2012, supervising Fox Broadcasting Company, 20th Century Fox Television, FX Networks, Fox Sports (encompassing Fox’s national sports channels, FS1 and FS2 and its 22 regional sports networks) and National Geographic Partners (which includes the National Geographic channels and brands).

Rice was appointed president of 21st Century Fox in 2017. Rice continued to serve as chairman and CEO of Fox Networks Group, which included all of Fox’s TV assets, with the exception of Fox News, which was run separately. He was also the chairman of the board of National Geographic Partners and Fox's lead executive on the board of directors for Hulu.

=== Disney ===
Rice joined The Walt Disney Company in 2019 following Disney's acquisition of 21st Century Fox. Upon joining, Rice became the chairman of Walt Disney Television (all of Disney's non-sports television businesses). In this role, Rice oversaw ABC Entertainment, ABC News, ABC Owned Television Stations, Disney Branded Television, Disney Television Studios, Freeform, FX, Hulu Originals, National Geographic, and Onyx Collective.

As chairman of Walt Disney Television, Rice oversaw the production of over 300 shows and 4,000 hours of television per year across Disney’s family of networks and streaming platforms Disney+ and Hulu. Disney earned 147 Primetime Emmy Award nominations in 2022 and 146 in 2021. While with Disney, Rice served as chairman of the board of A&E Networks and continued to serve as chairman of the board of National Geographic Partners.

On 9 June 2022, Rice was fired from The Walt Disney Company by Bob Chapek.

=== Producer ===
On 1 June 2023, Rice made a nonexclusive deal with the independent entertainment company A24.

In 2024, Rice produced Jason Reitman’s Saturday Night for Columbia Pictures. In 2025, he produced Warfare written and directed by Ray Mendoza and Alex Garland for A24, and 28 Years Later written by Alex Garland and directed by Danny Boyle for Columbia. Rice is also listed as a producer for 28 Years Later: The Bone Temple written by Alex Garland and directed by Nia DaCosta.

Rice’s project in development include Elden Ring written and to be directed by Alex Garland. In TV, Rice is developing Fairy Tale with Paul Greengrass. Misty Green, written and directed by Chris Rock was released in October 2026.

In July 2025, Rice was hired to produce the Olympic and Paralympic ceremonies for Los Angeles 2028. LA28 CEO Casey Wassermann did not provide a budget.

=== Netflix ===
In October 2026, Rice was named as Netflix, Inc.'s chief content officer, replacing Bela Bajaria following a significant workforce reduction at the company. Rice will also continue his role as executive producer for the Los Angeles 2028 opening and closing ceremonies.

== Personal life ==
Rice lives in Los Angeles with his family. He has two children. He serves on the board of governors of the Motion Picture & Television Fund.

== Filmography ==
Year	Film	Credit
2024	Saturday Night	Producer
2025	Warfare	Producer
2025	28 Years Later	Producer
2026	28 Years Later: The Bone Temple	Producer
2026	The Social Reckoning	Producer
2028	Elden Ring	Producer
