= DNA Films =

British film production company

Franchise Holder Limited
- Formerly: DNA Films Limited (February 1997–August 2003)
- Industry: Film
- Founded: 1996; 30 years ago
- Founder: Andrew Macdonald; Duncan Kenworthy
- Headquarters: London, England
- Divisions: DNA TV Limited
- Website: DNAFilms.com

Franchise Holder Limited, trading as DNA Films, is a British film production company founded by Andrew Macdonald and Duncan Kenworthy in 1997, best known for producing films directed by Alex Garland. They also have a television division with Walt Disney Television called DNA TV Limited.

== Location ==
DNA Films has been one of the most successful production companies that is located in the United Kingdom. DNA Films is located in London.

== Filmography ==
=== Film productions ===
- Trainspotting (1996)
- Beautiful Creatures (2000)
- Strictly Sinatra (2001)
- The Parole Officer (2001)
- Heartlands (2002)
- The Final Curtain (2002)
- 28 Days Later (2002)
- Love Actually (2003)
- Separate Lies (2005)
- Notes on a Scandal (2006)
- The History Boys (2006)
- The Last King of Scotland (2006)
- Sunshine (2007)
- 28 Weeks Later (2007)
- Never Let Me Go (2010)
- Dredd (2012) (co-production with IM Global, Lionsgate, Reliance BIG Pictures, IMAX and Entertainment Film Distributors)
- Sunshine on Leith (2013)
- Ex Machina (2014)
- Far from the Madding Crowd (2015)
- T2 Trainspotting (2017)
- Annihilation (2018)
- Sir Alex Ferguson: Never Give In (2021)
- Men (2022)
- Civil War (2024)
- Warfare (2025)
- 28 Years Later (2025)
- 28 Years Later: The Bone Temple (2026)
- Elden Ring (2028)

=== Television ===
- Devs (2020)
- Black Narcissus (2020)
- Shōgun (2024)
