= Jimmy Crystal =

Character from the 28 Days Later franchise

- 28 Days Later character
- Jack O'Connell as Jimmy Crystal in 28 Years Later: The Bone Temple (2026)
- First appearance: 28 Years Later (2025)
- Last appearance: 28 Years Later: The Bone Temple (2026)
- Created by: Alex Garland; Danny Boyle
- Portrayed by: Jack O'Connell (adult); Rocco Haynes (child)

In-universe information
- Full name: Jimmy Crystal
- Alias: Sir Lord Jimmy
- Occupation: Cult leader
- Religion: A form of Satanism
- Nationality: British (Scottish)

Jimmy Crystal (or Sir Lord Jimmy Crystal) is a character in the 28 Days Later film series created by Alex Garland and Danny Boyle, serving as a minor character in 28 Years Later (2025) and as the main antagonist of 28 Years Later: The Bone Temple (2026).

Portrayed by Jack O'Connell as an adult and Rocco Haynes as a child, Jimmy is the psychopathic leader of a satanic cult of survivors of the Rage Virus pandemic known as the 'Jimmies' or the 'Fingers', whose members all take the name "Jimmy" and wear brightly coloured tracksuits and peroxide-blonde wigs, partly inspired by the public persona of British sexual predator and television personality Jimmy Savile.

== Appearances ==
In 28 Years Later, Jimmy Crystal is first shown as a young child living in the Scottish Highlands during the initial rage virus outbreak in 2002, when his family, including his vicar father, are killed or infected. He survives and retains a crucifix given to him by his father, which becomes a recurring talisman in his adult life. Crystal appears as an adult leader of a group defined by his beliefs. In their first encounter with the protagonist of the film, a young survivor named Spike, Crystal's followers save Spike from the Infected, after which, Crystal recruits him to join the cult.

In 28 Years Later: The Bone Temple, the adult Jimmy assumes the title Sir Lord Jimmy Crystal and forms the "Fingers", a cult whose members all take the name "Jimmy" (with slight variations) and commit ritualized acts of violence, claiming to deliver "souls to hell". The group is identified by its uniform of tracksuits and blonde wigs and by the repeated use of the name "Jimmy" as graffiti and markings left at attack sites. Crystal leads the Fingers across rural England, raiding survivor settlements and capturing people. New recruits are forced to fight existing members in one-on-one matches; losers are killed, and survivors are renamed "Jimmy".

During one raid, Jimmy orders captives to be flayed as an offering to Satan, whom he believes is his father. Later, Crystal brings the remaining Fingers to the Bone Temple, an ossuary built by Dr. Ian Kelson. As his followers believe Kelson to be Satan, he demands that Kelson validate his authority over the cult. During a ritual involving music and hallucinogens, Kelson manipulates the group, resulting in Crystal losing control. Jimmy fatally stabs Kelson but is wounded and then overpowered by the cult. He is crucified on an inverted cross and is last seen being attacked by the Infected while Spike and Kellie escape.

== Concept and creation ==
"We see what happens to Jimmy Crystal as a kid, how dreadful and corrupting that has been for him."

— Jack O'Connell told The Hollywood Reporter about his character, referring to the opening scene of 28 Years Later (2025).

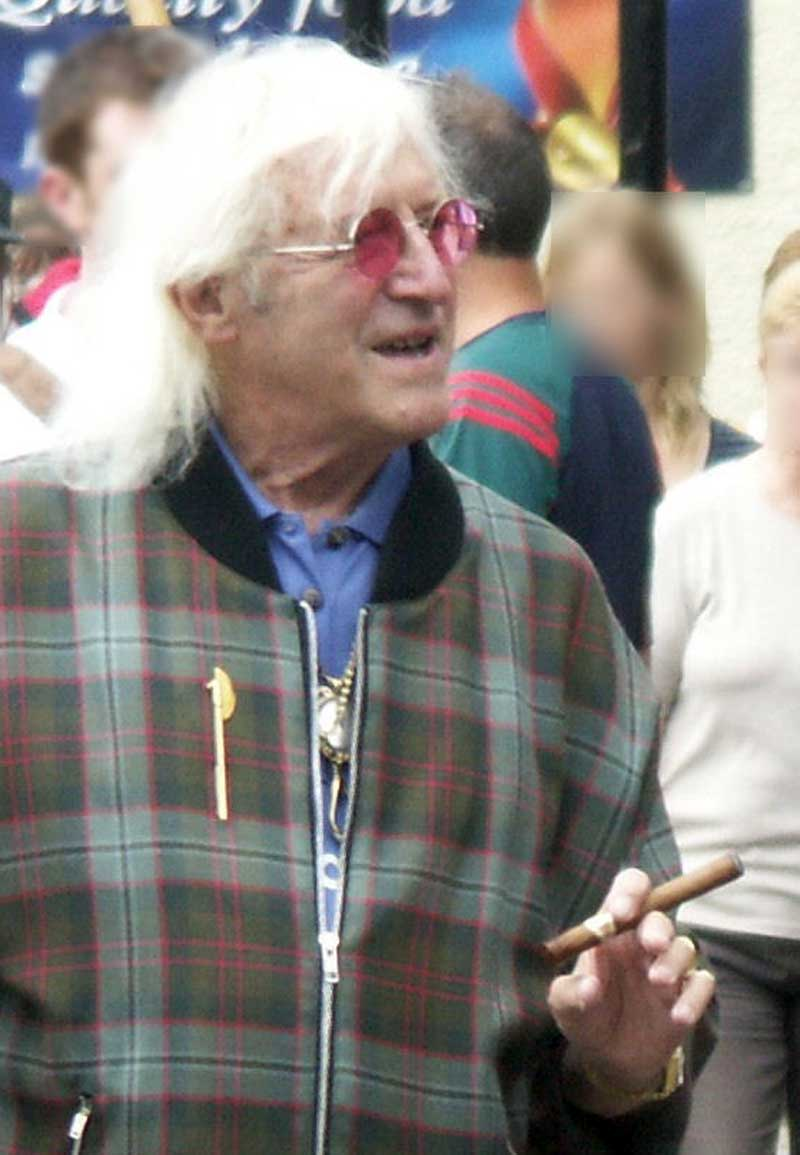
The character was based on British sexual predator and TV personality Jimmy Savile, including aspects of his physical appearance.

Jimmy Crystal was portrayed by English actor Jack O'Connell. The character first appears in 28 Years Later and is further developed in 28 Years Later: The Bone Temple where he is shown as the leader of a cult known as the Jimmies or the Fingers. Crystal heads a group of violent followers who all take the name "Jimmy" and wear brightly colored tracksuits with stained blonde wigs. His character has been described as a "charismatic psycho" leader of a survivor cult.

The character draws inspiration from real-life British sexual predator and TV personality Jimmy Savile, whose public reputation as a celebrity and philanthropist masked decades of sexual abuse. According to O'Connell, his references to Savile reflect the "zeitgeist" of that time. He said that Crystal represents "unchecked power" and is a reminder of a time when fame went without consequences. O'Connell chose the purple velour tracksuit for Crystal to suggest a sense of "royalty" and "monarchy". Crystal's cult of personality openly worships the devil, while also making Savile seem almost mythical through their appearance and rituals. His group's strange look and cruel way of handing out "charity" make them particularly disturbing. Writer Alex Garland said Crystal was like a "trippy, messed-up kaleidoscope" of a past remembered in bits and pieces. Director Danny Boyle said he was "holding onto things and turning them into images for his followers."

The character's backstory begins during the rage virus outbreak in 2002. As a child, he survived an attack on his family by infected individuals. His father, a minister, reacted to the attack by calling it a divine cleansing. Crystal fled to a nearby church, where his father gave him a gold cross and instructed him to escape. The events he witnessed as a child later influenced him to create a cult, whose members are bound by strict rituals and loyalty exercises.

== Characterization ==
From the movie 28 Years Later: The Bone Temple, Jimmy Crystal is a brutal and ruthless leader who rules the Jimmies or the Fingers through fear and violence. He keeps control over his followers using cruelty and manipulation, while his charisma helps him bend survivors to his will. The post-apocalyptic world gave him the opportunity to rise as a powerful and dangerous figure. His leadership relies on terror, leaving people with no choice but to obey him or risk everything by opposing him.

== Reception ==
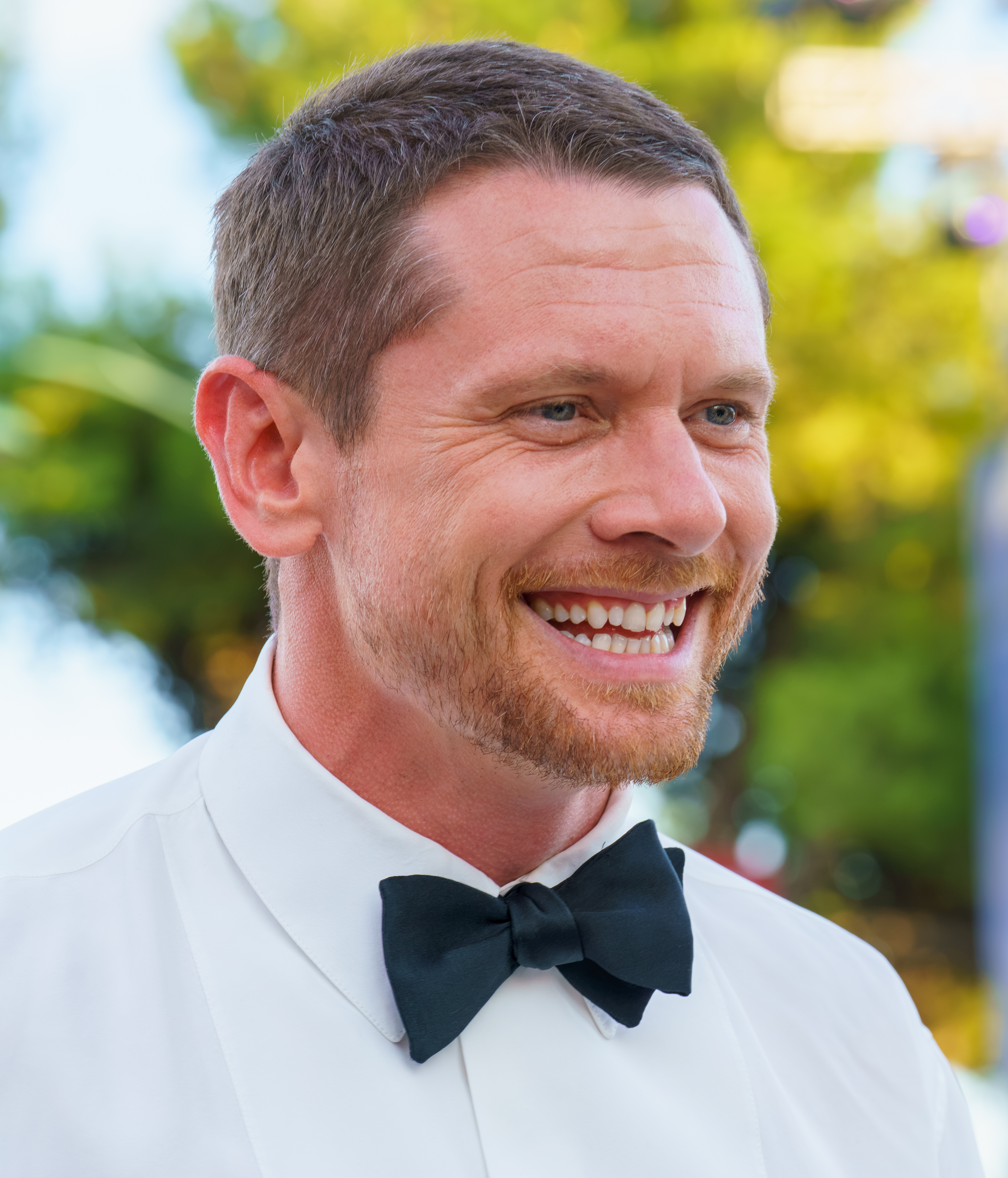
Jack O'Connell's (pictured in 2026) performance as Jimmy was praised by critics.

Jimmy Crystal has been described as one of the most unsettling characters in the franchise. Amy West of Total Film wrote that Crystal has strict rules for the size of his murderous cult, and their twisted philosophy is as "dark" as it is heartbreaking. One child escapes, which viewers later realize is Jimmy, and some have suggested that he sees his loyal "Fingers" as the siblings he has lost.

David Crow of Den of Geek wrote that Jimmy and his followers may represent a darker side of this descent into backwards thinking: people who see themselves as noble, entitled, or even divinely chosen to rise above everyone else. Jesse Hassenger of Decider said that Jimmy is a completely different character, one we haven’t seen outside these bookending scenes. He also noted that the character carries some British cultural references that may not be familiar to most U.S. viewers.

Some North American viewers dressed as Crystal and members of his gang, unaware of the connection to Savile. This prompted criticism and ridicule from Britons.

=== Accolades ===
Jack O'Connell's performance as Jimmy Crystal in 28 Years Later: The Bone Temple earned him a Best Supporting Actor nomination at the 9th Astra Midseason Movie Awards.
