= 8th Astra Midseason Movie Awards =

Astra Midseason Movie Awards

- Date: July 3, 2025
- Official website: theastras.com

Highlights
- Best Picture: Sinners
- Most awards: Sinners (6)
- Most nominations: Sinners (7)

The winners of the 8th Astra Midseason Movie Awards, presented by the Hollywood Creative Alliance, were announced on July 3, 2025, on the association's official Instagram and Twitter accounts.

The nominations were announced on June 30, 2025. Sinners led the nominations with seven, followed by Materialists with six and F1 with five. Sinners received the most awards, winning six of its seven nominations. The film won every category it was nominated for, including Best Picture, Best Director (Ryan Coogler), Best Actor (Michael B. Jordan), Best Supporting Actor (Miles Caton), and Best Supporting Actress (Hailee Steinfeld).

All films considered and nominated were released between January 1 and June 30, 2025.

== Winners and nominees ==
Winners are listed first and highlighted with boldface

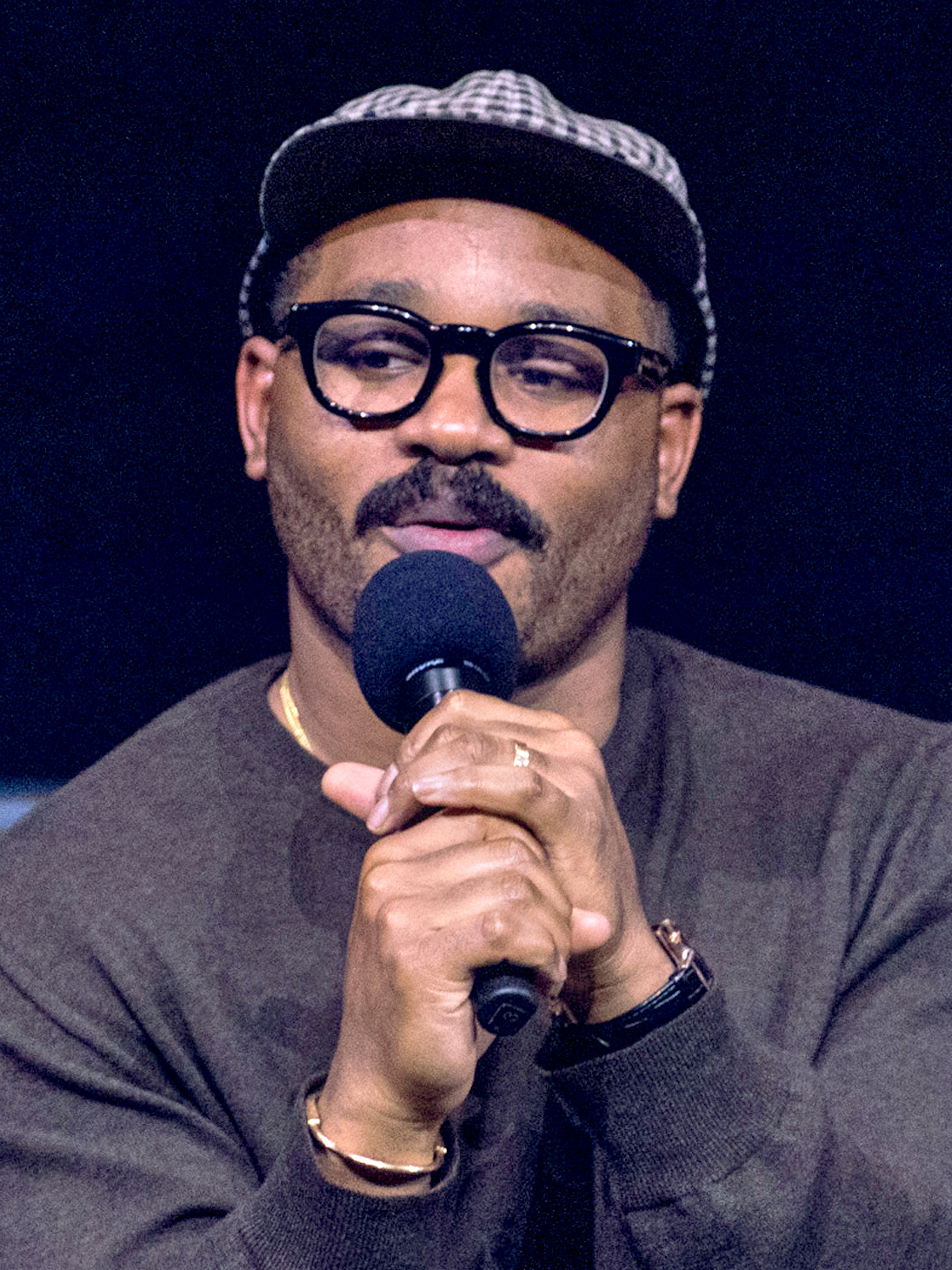
Ryan Coogler, Best Director and Best Screenplay winner

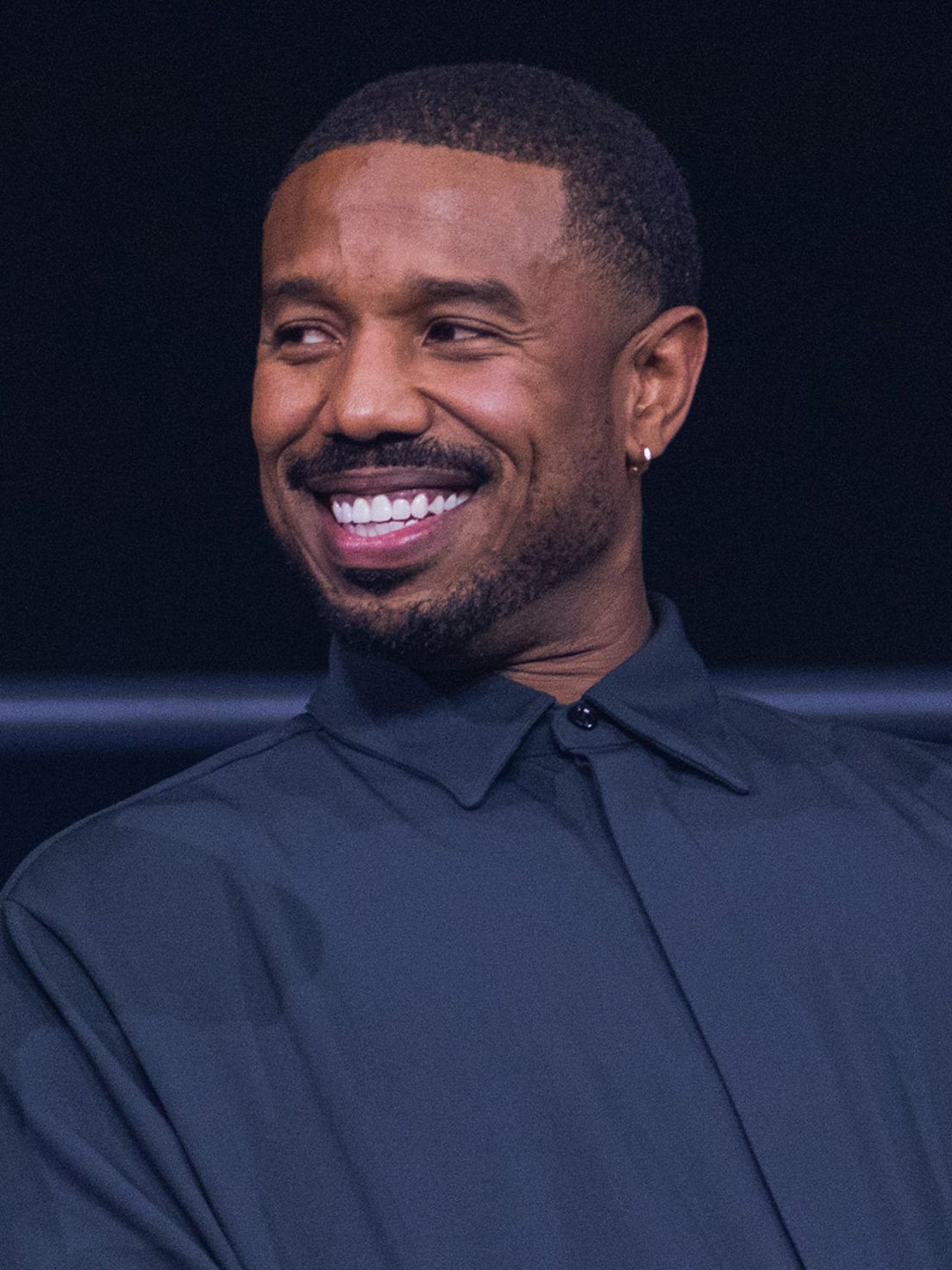
Michael B. Jordan, Best Actor winner

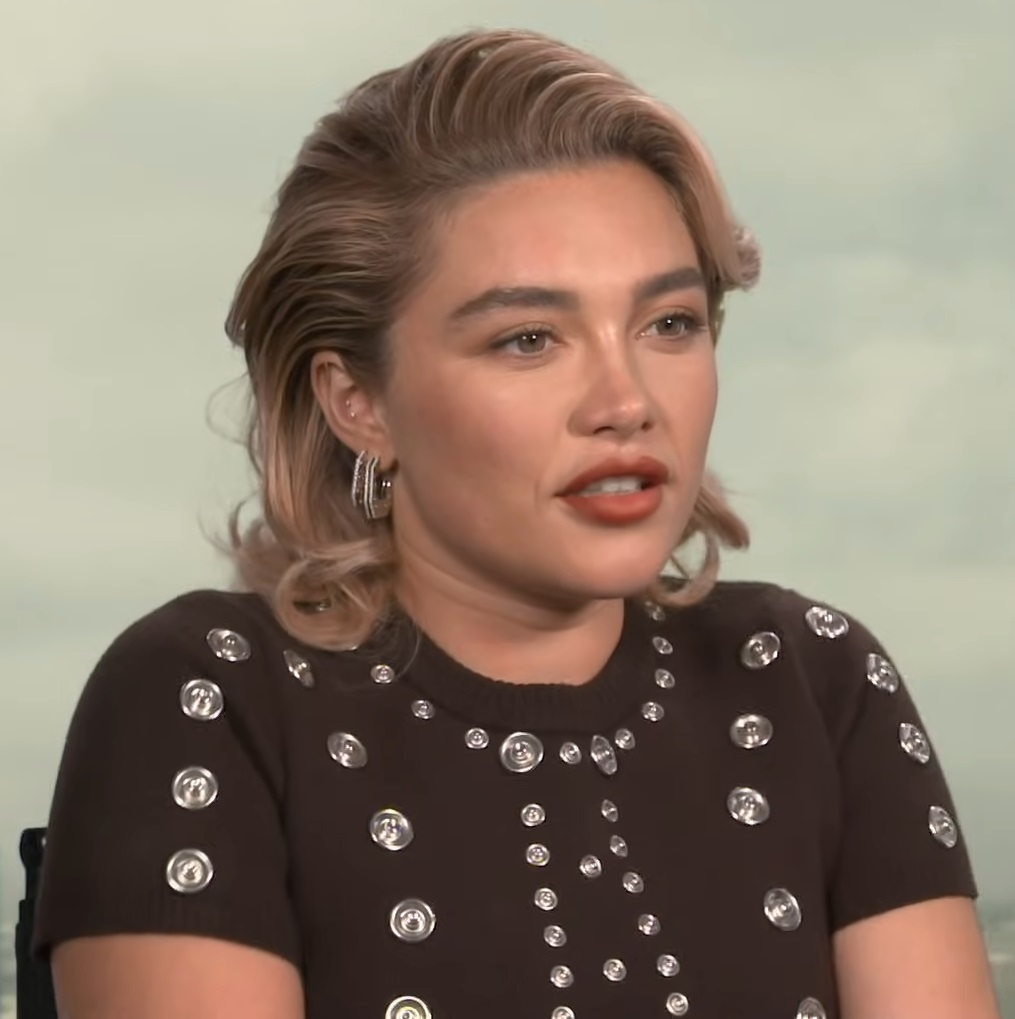
Florence Pugh, Best Actress winner

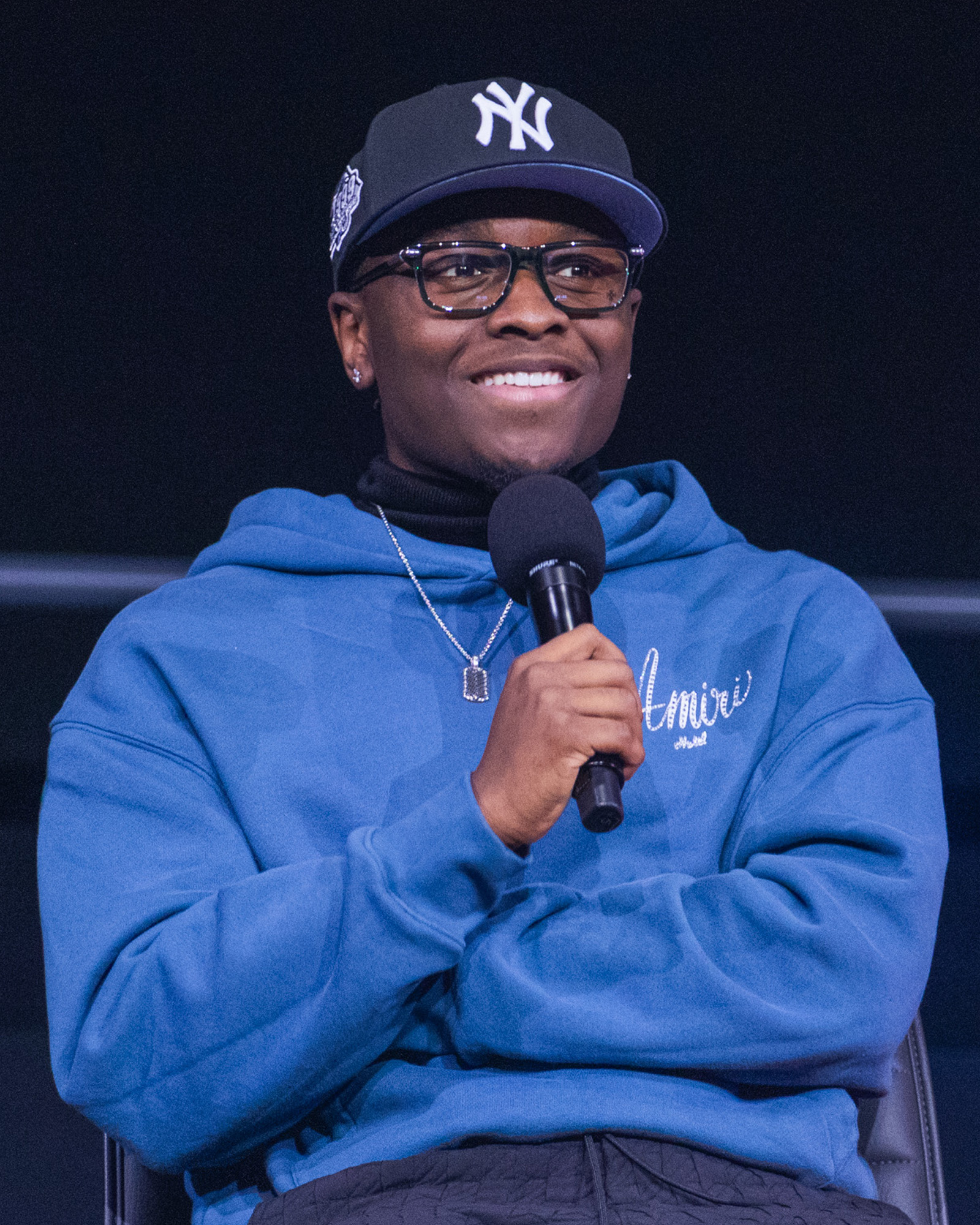
Miles Caton, Best Supporting Actor winner

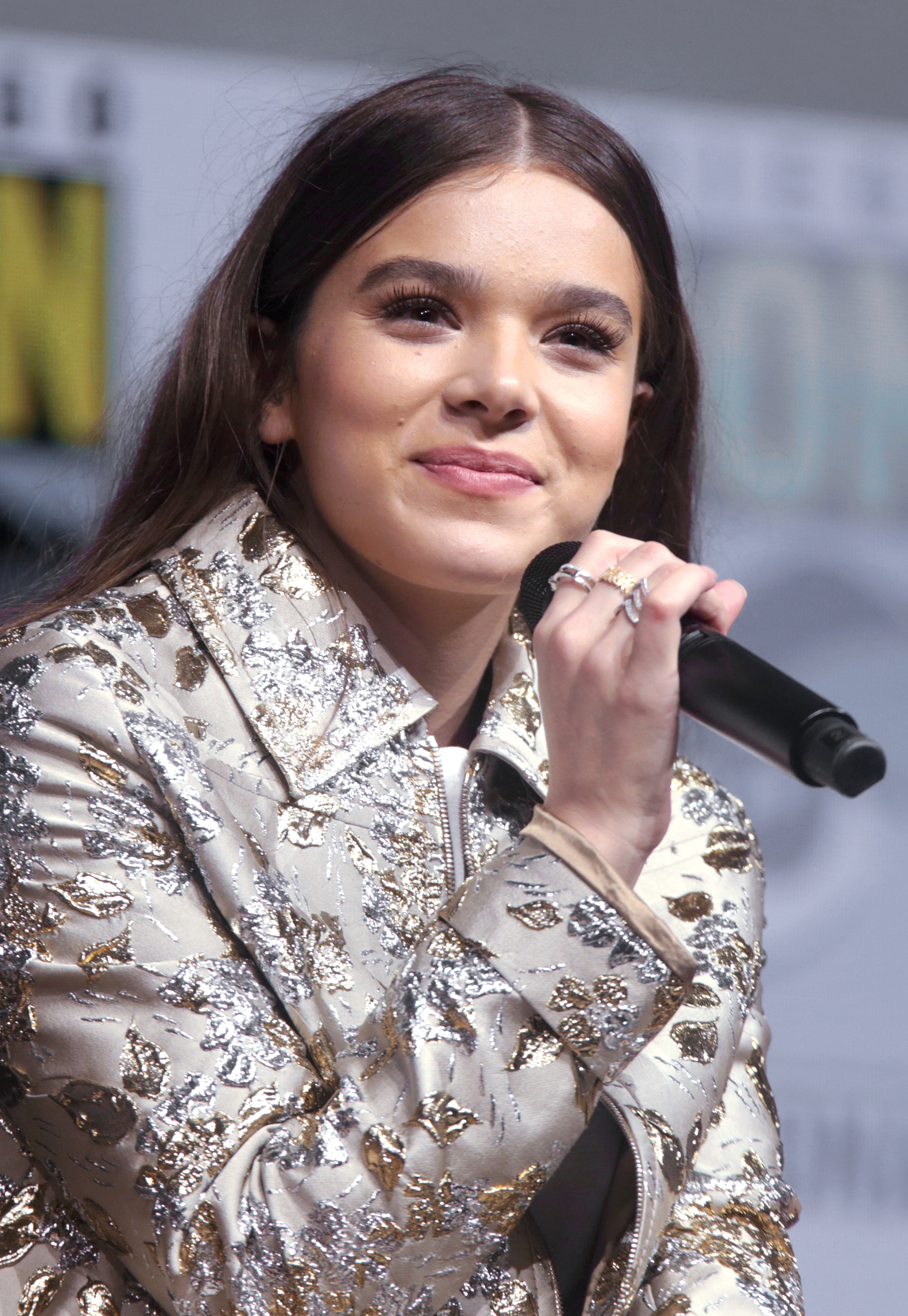
Hailee Steinfeld, Best Supporting Actress winner

**Best Picture**: **Sinners**; Runner-up: The Life of Chuck; 28 Years Later; Black Bag; F1; Materialists; Mission: Impossible – The Final Reckoning; Sorry, Baby; Thunderbolts*; Warfare	**Best Director**: **Ryan Coogler – Sinners**; Runner-up: Mike Flanagan – The Life of Chuck; Celine Song – Materialists; Danny Boyle – 28 Years Later; Steven Soderbergh – Black Bag
**Best Actor**: **Michael B. Jordan – Sinners as Elijah "Smoke" Moore / Elias "Stack" Moore**; Runner-up: Robert Pattinson – Mickey 17 as Mickey Barnes / Mickey 17 / Mickey 18; Alfie Williams – 28 Years Later as Spike; Brad Pitt – F1 as Sonny Hayes; Chris Evans – Materialists as John Finch	**Best Actress**: **Florence Pugh – Thunderbolts* as Yelena Belova**; Runner-up: Eva Victor – Sorry, Baby as Agnes; Dakota Johnson – Materialists as Lucy Mason; Sally Hawkins – Bring Her Back as Laura; Sophie Thatcher – Companion as Iris
**Best Supporting Actor**: **Miles Caton – Sinners as Samuel "Sammie" Moore**; Runner-up: Mark Hamill – The Life of Chuck as Albie Krantz; Javier Bardem – F1 as Ruben Cervantes; Lewis Pullman – Thunderbolts* as Robert "Bob" Reynolds / Sentry / The Void; Pedro Pascal – Materialists as Harry Castillo	**Best Supporting Actress**: **Hailee Steinfeld – Sinners as Mary**; Runner-up: Wunmi Mosaku – Sinners as Annie; Jodie Comer – 28 Years Later as Isla; Kerry Condon – F1 as Kate McKenna; Marisa Abela – Black Bag as Clarissa Dubose
**Best Screenplay**: **Ryan Coogler – Sinners**; Runner-up: Mike Flanagan – The Life of Chuck; Celine Song – Materialists; Eva Victor – Sorry, Baby; Tom Basden and Tim Key – The Ballad of Wallis Island	**Best Horror**: **Bring Her Back**; Runner-up: Companion; Final Destination Bloodlines; Heart Eyes; The Monkey
**Best Indie**: **Bob Trevino Likes It**; Runner-up: Dangerous Animals; A Nice Indian Boy; Jane Austen Wrecked My Life; My Dead Friend Zoe	**Best Stunts**: **Mission: Impossible – The Final Reckoning**; Runner-up: Ballerina; F1; Thunderbolts*; Warfare
**Most Anticipated Film**: **Wicked: For Good**; Runner-up: Weapons; Avatar: Fire and Ash; The Fantastic Four: First Steps; Superman

== Films with multiple awards ==
The following film received multiple awards:

Wins	Film
6	Sinners

== Films with multiple nominations ==
The following films received multiple nominations:

Nominations	Film
7	Sinners
6	Materialists
5	F1
4	28 Years Later
4	The Life of Chuck
4	Thunderbolts*
3	Black Bag
3	Sorry, Baby
2	Bring Her Back
2	Companion
2	Mission: Impossible – The Final Reckoning
2	Warfare

== See also ==
- 5th Astra TV Awards
- 9th Astra Film Awards
- 4th Astra Creative Arts Awards
