= Astra Midseason Movie Award for Best Actor =

Film award

The Astra Midseason Movie Award for Best Actor is one of the annual mid-season awards given by the Hollywood Creative Alliance.

== Winners and nominees ==
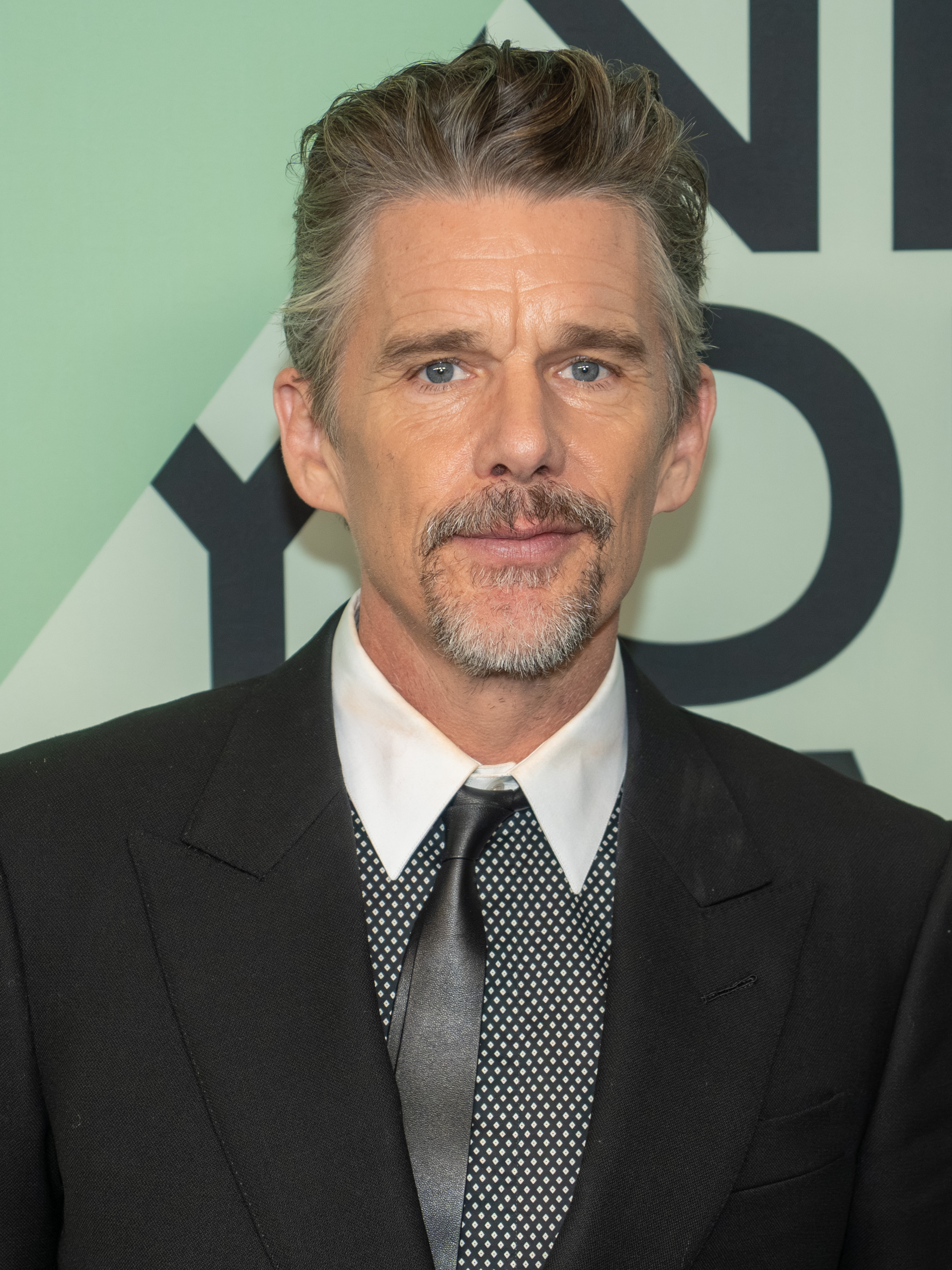
Ethan Hawke was the inaugural winner in this category for First Reformed (2018)

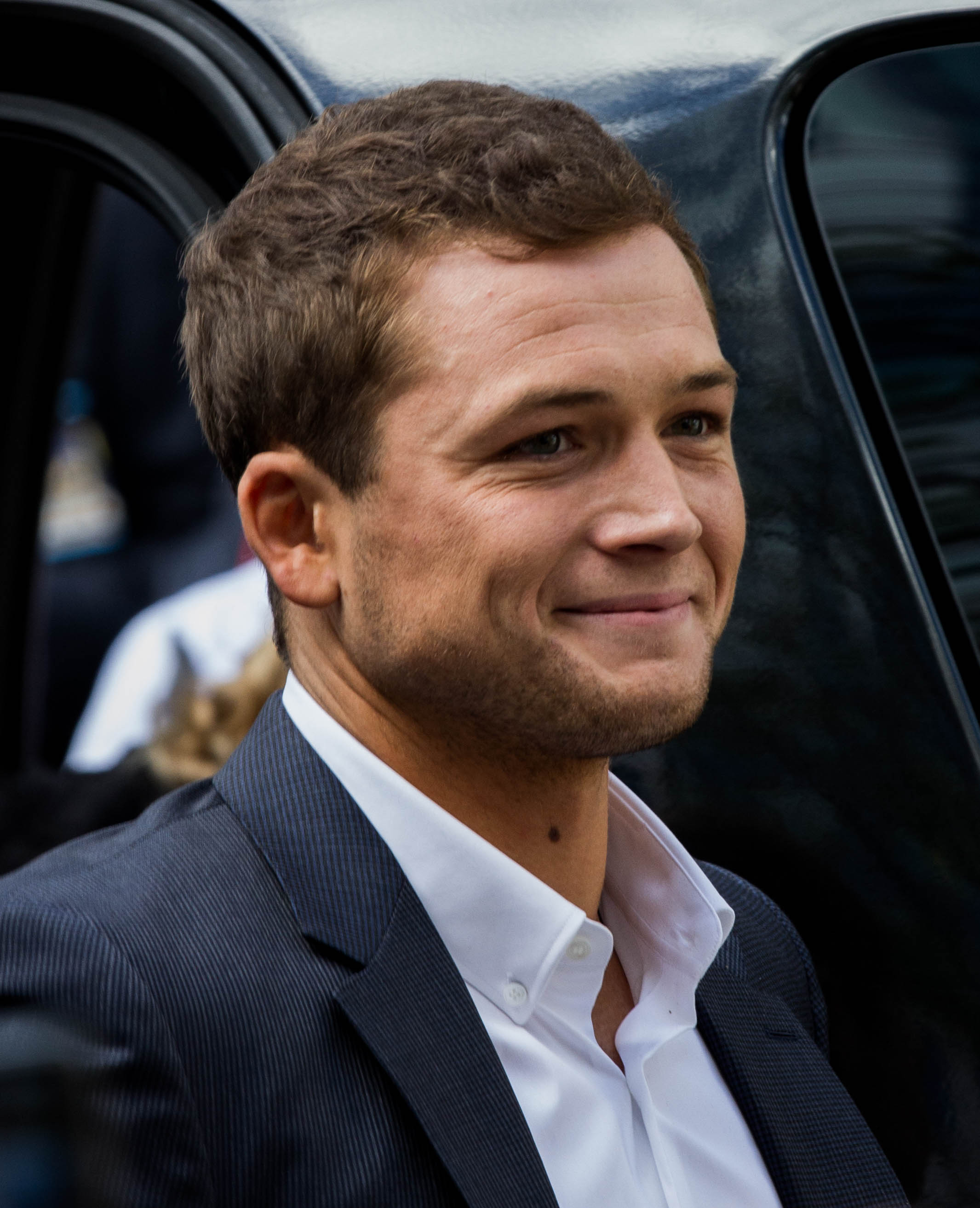
Taron Egerton won for Rocketman (2019)

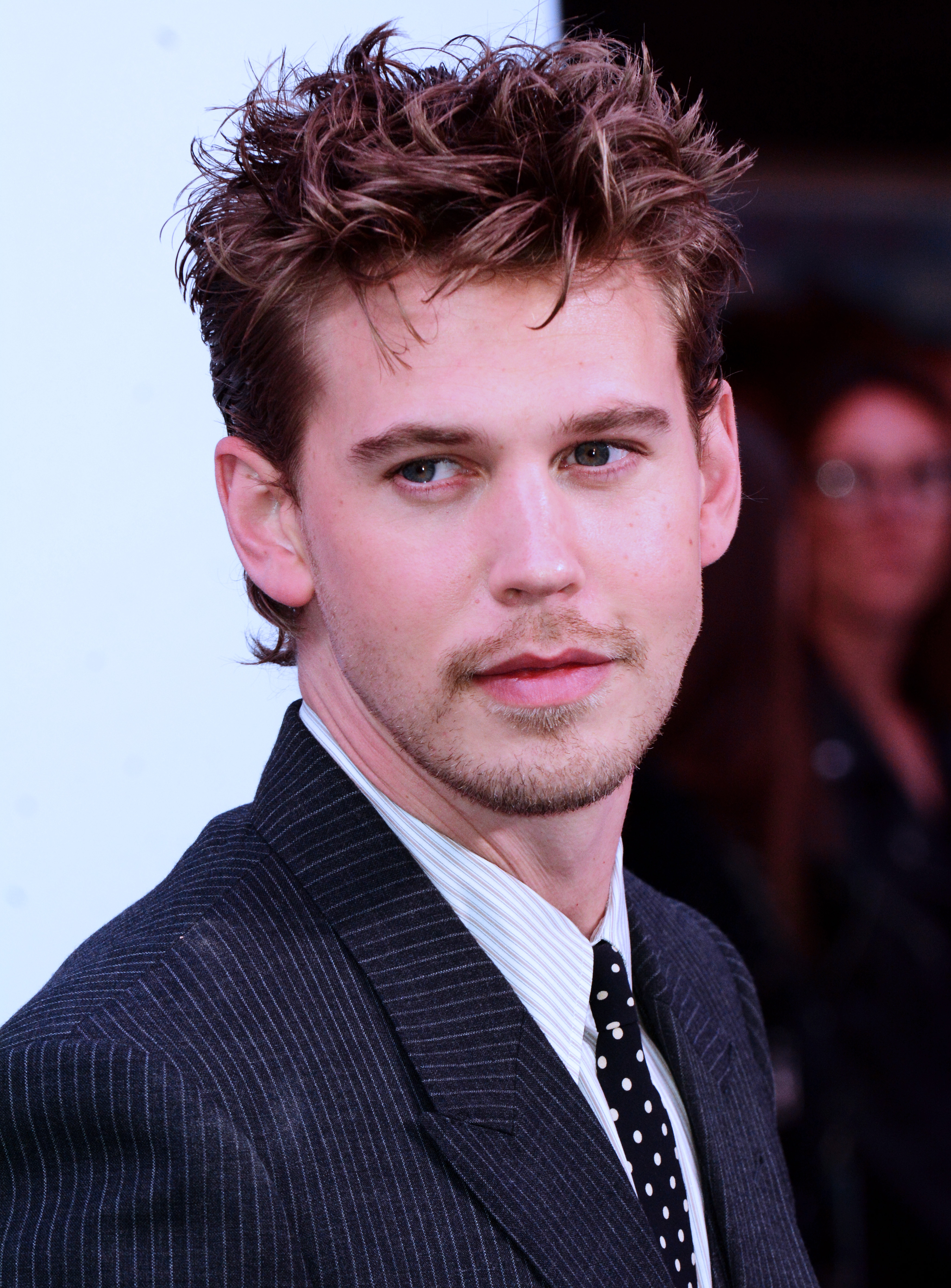
Austin Butler won for Elvis (2022)

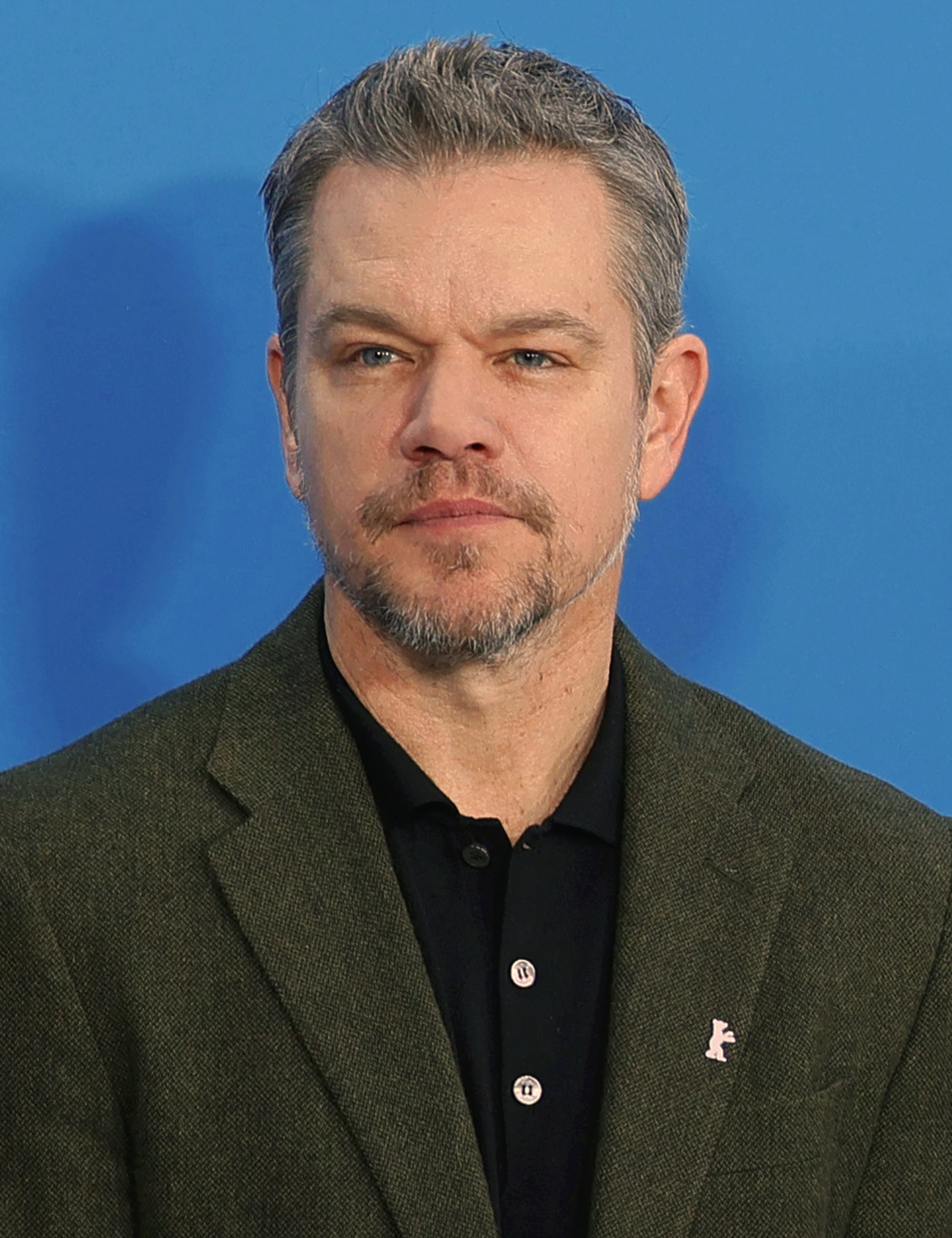
Matt Damon won for Air (2023)

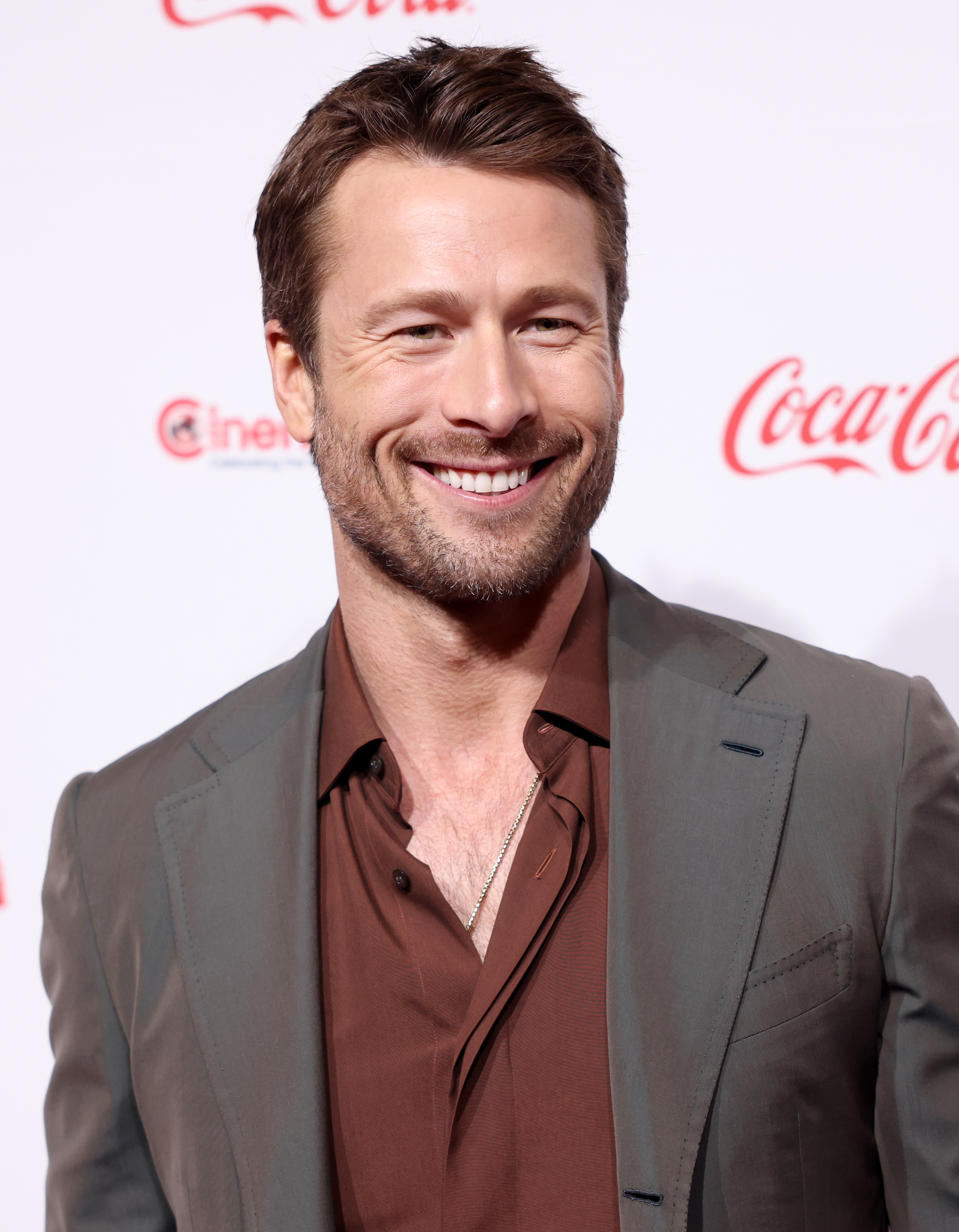
Glen Powell won for Hit Man (2024)

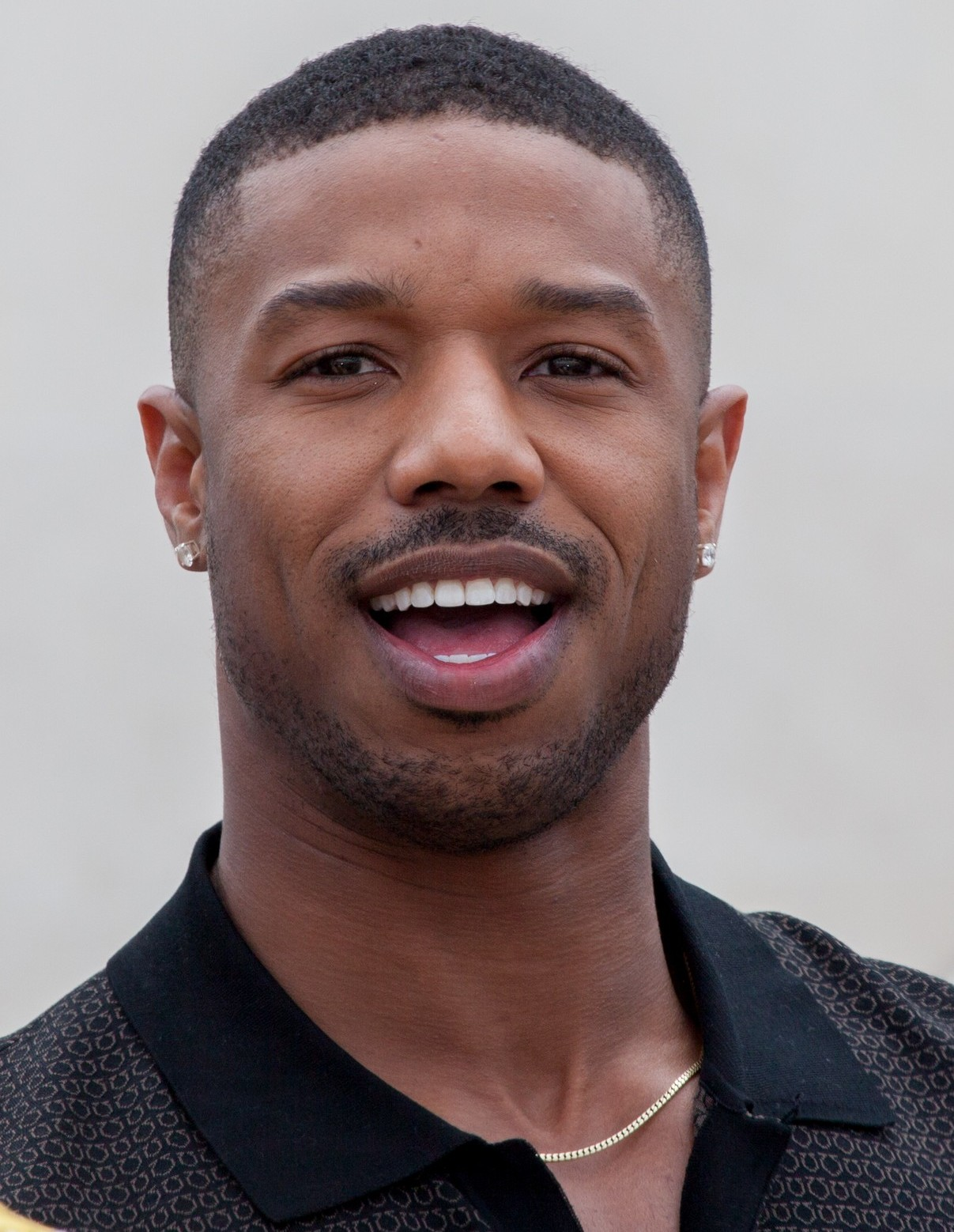
Michael B. Jordan won for Sinners (2025)

=== 2010s ===
Year	Actor	Role(s)	Project(s)	Ref.
2018	Ethan Hawke	First Reformed	Ernst Toller	
2018	Joaquin Phoenix	You Were Never Really Here	Joe	
2018	Chadwick Boseman	Black Panther	T'Challa / Black Panther	
2018	John Krasinski	A Quiet Place	Lee Abbott	
2018	Nick Robinson	Love, Simon	Simon	
2019	Taron Egerton	Rocketman	Elton John	
2019	Robert Downey Jr.	Avengers: Endgame	Tony Stark / Iron Man	
2019	Keanu Reeves	John Wick: Chapter 3	John Wick	
2019	Winston Duke	Us	Gabe Wilson / Abraham	
2019	Zachary Levi	Shazam!	Shazam	

=== 2020s ===
Year	Actor	Role(s)	Project(s)	Ref.
2020	Delroy Lindo	Da 5 Bloods	Paul	
2020	Ben Affleck	The Way Back	Jack Cunningham	
2020	Hugh Jackman	Bad Education	Frank Tassone	
2020	Joseph Gordon-Levitt	7500	Tobias Ellis	
2020	Pete Davidson	The King of Staten Island	Scott Hicks	
2021	Anthony Ramos	In the Heights	Usnavi de la Vega	
2021	Bob Odenkirk	Nobody	Hutch "Nobody" Mansell	
2021	Armando Espitia	I Carry You with Me	Iván	
2021	Mads Mikkelsen	Riders of Justice	Marcus	
2021	Clayne Crawford	The Killing of Two Lovers	David	
2022	Austin Butler	Elvis	Elvis Presley	
2022	Nicolas Cage	The Unbearable Weight of Massive Talent	Nic Cage	
2022	Tom Cruise	Top Gun: Maverick	Pete "Maverick" Mitchell	
2022	Alexander Skarsgård	The Northman	Amleth	
2022	Sebastian Stan	Fresh	Steve / Brendan	
2023	Matt Damon	Air	Sonny Vaccaro	
2023	Taron Egerton	Tetris	Henk Rogers	
2023	Michael B. Jordan	Creed III	Adonis "Donnie" Creed	
2023	Joaquin Phoenix	Beau Is Afraid	Beau Wassermann	
2023	Teo Yoo	Past Lives	Hae Sung	
2024	Glen Powell	Hit Man	Gary Johnson	
2024	Timothée Chalamet	Dune: Part Two	Paul Atreides	
2024	Ryan Gosling	The Fall Guy	Colt Seavers	
2024	Josh O'Connor	Challengers	Patrick Sweig	
2024	Justice Smith	I Saw the TV Glow	Owen	
2025	Michael B. Jordan	Sinners	Elijah "Smoke" Moore / Elias "Stack" Moore	
2025	Chris Evans	Materialists	John Finch	
2025	Robert Pattinson	Mickey 17	Mickey Barnes / Mickey 17 / Mickey 18	
2025	Brad Pitt	F1	Sonny Hayes	
2025	Alfie Williams	28 Years Later	Spike	
2026	Jaafar Jackson	Michael	Michael Jackson	
2026	Chiwetel Ejiofor	Backrooms	Clark	
2026	Ralph Fiennes	28 Years Later: The Bone Temple	Dr. Ian Kelson	
2026	Ryan Gosling	Project Hail Mary	Ryland Grace	
2026	Robert Pattinson	The Drama	Charlie Thompson	
2026	Leo Woodall	Tuner	Niki White	

== Multiple nominations ==
2 nominations

- Taron Egerton
- Ryan Gosling
- Michael B. Jordan
- Joaquin Phoenix
