= Playdate (film) =

- Release poster
- Directed by: Luke Greenfield
- Written by: Neil Goldman
- Produced by: Luke Greenfield; Jason Benoit; Mark Fasano; Jeffrey Greenstein; Sean O'Reilly
- Starring: Kevin James; Alan Ritchson; Sarah Chalke; Alan Tudyk; Benjamin Pajak; Banks Pierce; Hiro Kanagawa; Stephen Root; Isla Fisher
- Cinematography: Darran Tiernan
- Edited by: Joe Mitacek
- Music by: Jeff Cardoni
- Production companies: WideAwake Pictures; Nickel City Pictures; A Higher Standard
- Distributed by: Amazon MGM Studios (via Prime Video)
- Release date: November 12, 2025
- Running time: 94 minutes
- Country: United States
- Language: English

Playdate is a 2025 American buddy action comedy film directed by Luke Greenfield and written by Neil Goldman. It stars Kevin James and Alan Ritchson alongside Sarah Chalke, Alan Tudyk, Benjamin Pajak, Banks Pierce, Hiro Kanagawa, Stephen Root, and Isla Fisher. The film follows Brian (James), a recently unemployed accountant and father who winds up on a playdate with stay-at-home dad Jeff (Ritchson), only for the two of them to be targeted by mercenaries along with their sons (when Jeff reveals he and his “son” are on the run from both the military and the authorities).

The film was released on Amazon Prime Video on November 12, 2025, where it became the number 1 film in the US that week.

== Plot ==
Recently laid-off forensic accountant Brian Jennings struggles to adjust to life as a stay-at-home dad for his stepson Lucas, who is bullied at school for being effeminate and uninterested in sports. While his wife Emily returns to work at the law firm, Brian hopes to help Lucas make friends and arranges a playdate with Jeff Eamon, a charismatic and hyper-athletic stay-at-home dad new to the neighborhood, and his eerily strong (plus emotionally stunted) young son CJ.

What begins as an awkward afternoon at Buckee Cheese, an indoor playground, quickly spirals into chaos when a team of armed mercenaries attacks, forcing the group to flee in a stolen minivan amid car chases and playground skirmishes. Jeff reveals he is a disgraced former Delta Force soldier who discovered CJ locked in a top-secret facility during his night shifts as a security guard, mistaking him for a captive child and breaking him out. Pursued relentlessly, the group seeks refuge at Jeff’s estranged father Gordon’s house, but he refuses to help, highlighting Jeff’s own abandonment issues.

Interrogating a facility employee Galifianakish, they learn the shocking truth: CJ (“Clone Jeff”) is the first successful clone of Jeff, created by eccentric billionaire scientist Simon Maddox and Colonel Kurtz, Jeff’s former commander. Kurtz views Jeff as the perfect soldier - tireless and skilled - but flawed by excessive empathy, exemplified by his court-martial for refusing to kill an innocent child (who was an unwilling suicide bomber) during a mission. Under the guise of routine drug tests at the facility, they harvested Jeff’s DNA to mass-produce emotionless supersoldiers incapable of PTSD or moral hesitation, aiming to revolutionize warfare by replacing human recruits.

When Maddox’s henchmen threaten Emily’s life, a guilt-ridden Brian betrays the group by luring Jeff into a trap, allowing CJ’s recapture. However, Brian redeems himself by aiding Jeff’s rescue mission. Following a GPS signal from Lucas’s phone (hidden in CJ’s jacket), they infiltrate a second facility swarming with feral CJ clones. Amid fierce battles, Maddox orders CJ to kill Jeff with a crossbow as a final test of his emotionless programming. CJ rebels, shooting Maddox instead and embracing his “found family,” proving clones can develop humanity through bonds.

In the climax, Brian crashes a car as a distraction, enabling Jeff to defeat Kurtz. Jeff detonates explosives he stashed in the facility, destroying the clones and apparent operation core. The four - Jeff, CJ, Brian, and Lucas - walk away from the explosion. Brian and Lucas affirm their bond, with Lucas declaring Brian the best dad. In a mid-credits scene teasing a sequel, Jeff and CJ arrive at Brian’s home at 2 a.m. for a sleepover, revealing their house was burned to the ground by a new group of pursuers, implying Maddox and Kurtz’s global cloning network persists.

== Cast ==
- Alan Ritchson as Jeff Eamon
- Kevin James as Brian Jennings
- Sarah Chalke as Emily
- Alan Tudyk as Simon Maddox
- Stephen Root as Gordon
- Isla Fisher as Leslie
- Benjamin Pajak as Lucas
- Banks Pierce as CJ
- Hiro Kanagawa as Colonel Kurtz
- Miles Fisher as Trent
- Luke Greenfield as Insanely Handsome Frat Exec
- Paul Walter Hauser as Galifinakish (uncredited)

== Production ==
In February 2024, it was announced that an action comedy film directed by Luke Greenfield and written by Neil Goldman was in development, with Kevin James and Alan Ritchson cast in the lead roles. In April, Sarah Chalke, Alan Tudyk, Stephen Root, Isla Fisher, Benjamin Pajak, and Banks Pierce joined the cast.

=== Filming ===
Principal photography began on March 11, 2024, in Vancouver, Canada, and wrapped on April 23.

== Release ==
Playdate was released on Amazon Prime Video on November 12, 2025.

== Reception ==
On the review aggregator website Rotten Tomatoes, 23% of 30 critics' reviews are positive, with an average rating of 3.9/10. The website's consensus reads: "Playdate is a bewildering mix of dated machismo, dull comedy, and chaotic action." Metacritic, which uses a weighted average, assigned the film a score of 20 out of 100, based on 6 critics, indicating "generally unfavorable" reviews.

According to M.N. Miller of FandomWire, "Ritchson steals every scene with absurd energy and surprising warmth, like a big golden retriever trapped in a comic book hero's body. Sweet, impetuous, and goofy, he's incredibly likable."
