= Benjamin Pajak =

American actor (born 2011)

- Born: March 24, 2011 (age 15); Westfield, New Jersey, U.S.
- Occupations: Actor; theatre actor
- Years active: 2020–present
- Website: benjaminpajak.com

Benjamin Pajak (born March 24, 2011) is an American child actor and singer in musicals and films. He is known for his Broadway debut in The Music Man, his leading role in Oliver! at New York City Center’s Encores!, and his breakout film roles in The Life of Chuck and Playdate, and his role in The Lost Boys as Sam Emerson.

== Early life and career ==
Benjamin Pajak was born in 2011 in Westfield, New Jersey. When he was six, he attended a Broadway performance of The Phantom of the Opera, an experience that made him interested in acting on stage. He later took part in several regional theatre productions, including Peter Pan, Winnie-the-Pooh, The Aristocats, and You're a Good Man, Charlie Brown. In early 2020, he was selected to play Winthrop Paroo in the Broadway revival of The Music Man, after his mother encouraged him to audition.

In 2022 Pajak was featured in the Broadway revival of The Music Man at the Winter Garden Theatre, with Pajak performing the cornet live; the production was postponed for two years because of the COVID-19 pandemic. Although the show received mixed reviews, Pajak's performance drew positive notice and earned him the Theatre World Award. The following year, he played the title role in Oliver! at New York City Center. In 2023, he appeared in a production of Ragtime at the Music Circus in Sacramento, California.

Pajak made his feature film debut after being cast at age 12 in Mike Flanagan's tragicomedy The Life of Chuck, a 2025 adaptation of the short story of the same name by Stephen King. There, he played a younger version of the title character, Charles "Chuck" Krantz. He then played Lucas in Playdate (2025). He has a leading role alongside Johnny Knoxville in Tiny Fugitives, directed by Michael Leven, which is yet to be released.

In 2026, Pajak played Sam Emerson in the musical comedy horror The Lost Boys (Palace Theatre). Based on the 1987 cult classic film of the same name, Pajak's participation earned him a nomination at the 2026 Dorian Awards for the Outstanding Featured Performance in a Broadway Musical. He also received another nomination at the Outer Critics Circle Awards for Outstanding Featured Performer in a Broadway Musical.

== Filmography ==
- 2022: Where It's Beautiful When It Rains (short film)
- 2024: The Life of Chuck as a 11-year old Chuck
- 2025: Playdate
- 2025: Tiny Fugitives
- 2027: The Exorcist: Martyrs

== Theatre credits ==
- 2022: The Music Man (Winter Garden Theatre)
- 2023: Oliver! (Maltz Jupiter Theatre & New York City Center)
- 2023: Golden Rainbow (Theater at St. Jean, NYC)
- 2023: ”Nine” (Merkin Hall)
- 2023: "I Am Harvey Milk" (Princeton Symphony Orchestra)
- 2023: Ragtime (Music Circus)
- 2024: “Figaro, A New Musical” (concert and concept album)
- 2026: The Lost Boys (Palace Theatre)

== Awards and nominations ==
Year	Award	Category	Result	Ref
2026	Dorian Awards	Outstanding Featured Performance in a Broadway Musical	Nominated	
2026	69th Annual Grammy Awards	Best Musical Theater Album	Pending	
2026	Outer Critics Circle Awards	Outstanding Featured Performer in a Broadway Musical	Nominated	
