= 4th Hollywood Critics Association Midseason Film Awards =

Hollywood Critics Association Midseason Film Awards

- Date: July 1, 2021
- Official website: hollywoodcreative.org

Highlights
- Best Picture: In the Heights
- Most awards: In the Heights (3)
- Most nominations: In the Heights (9)

The winners of the 4th Hollywood Critics Association Midseason Film Awards, presented by the Hollywood Critics Association, were revealed on July 1, 2021.

The nominations were announced on June 29, 2021. In the Heights received the most nominations with nine, followed by A Quiet Place Part II with six, and Cruella and Shiva Baby with five each.

In the Heights received the most awards with three wins, including Best Picture, followed by A Quiet Place Part II with two.

== Winners and nominees ==
Winners are listed first and highlighted with boldface

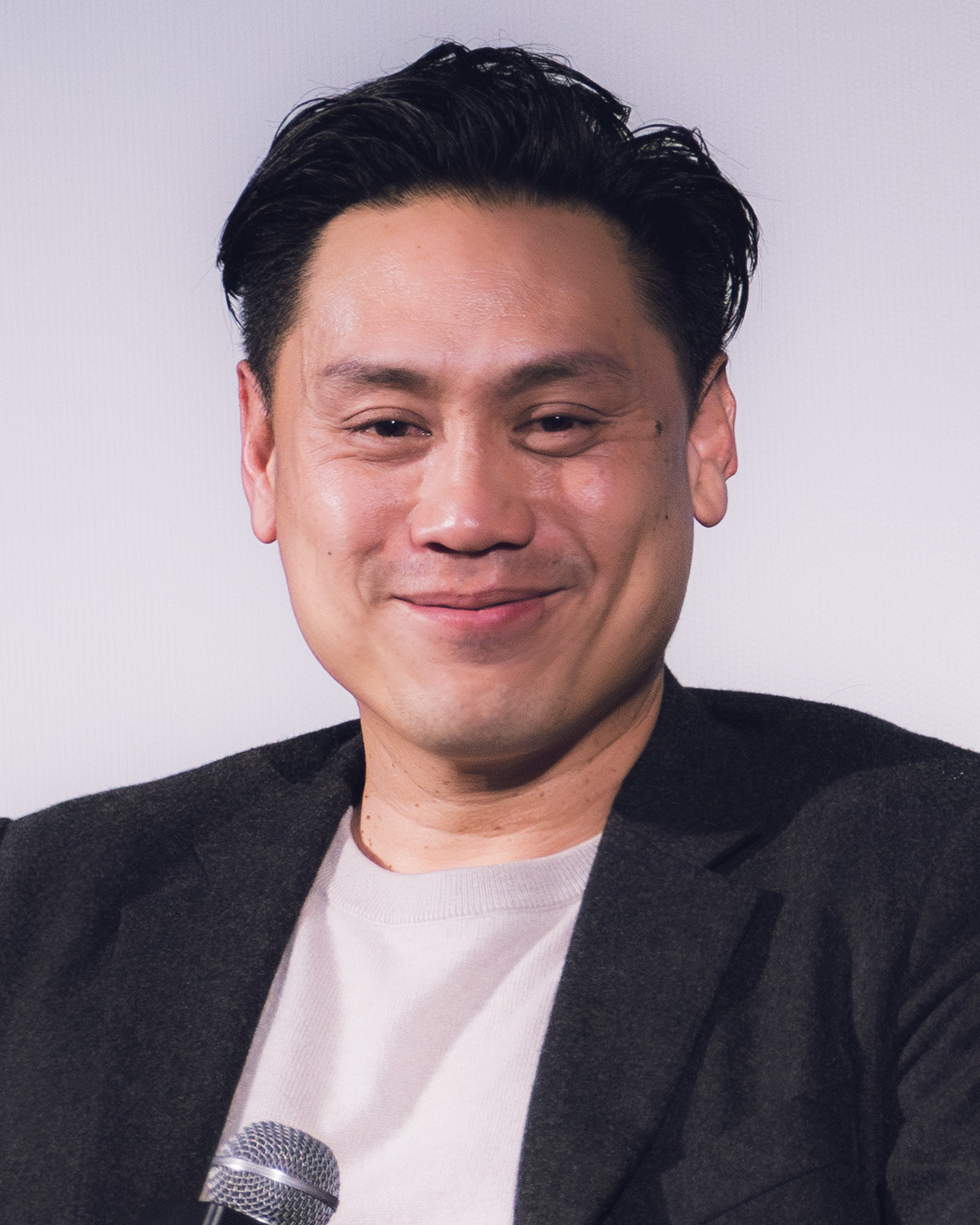
Jon M. Chu, Best Filmmaker winner

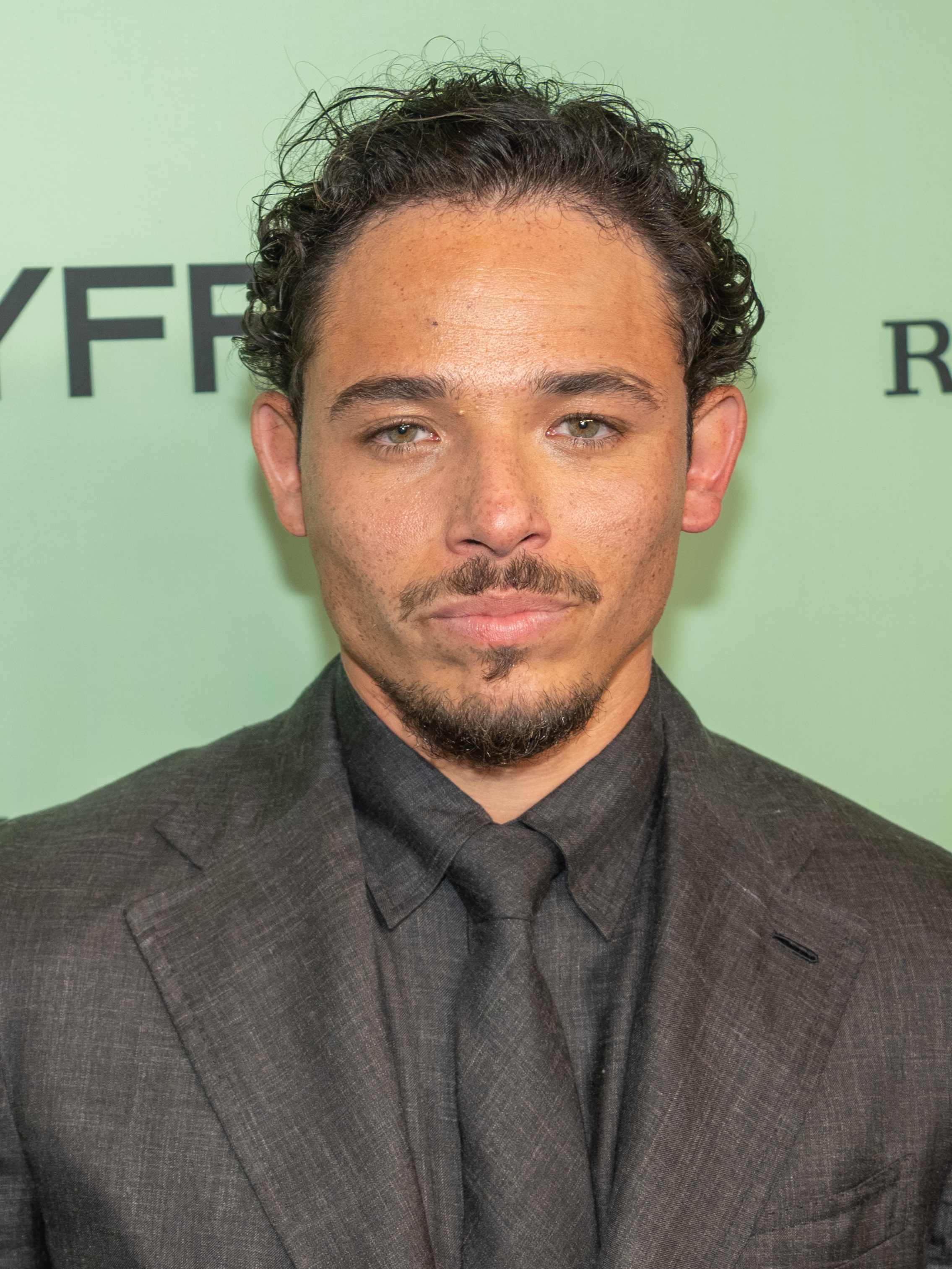
Anthony Ramos, Best Actor winner

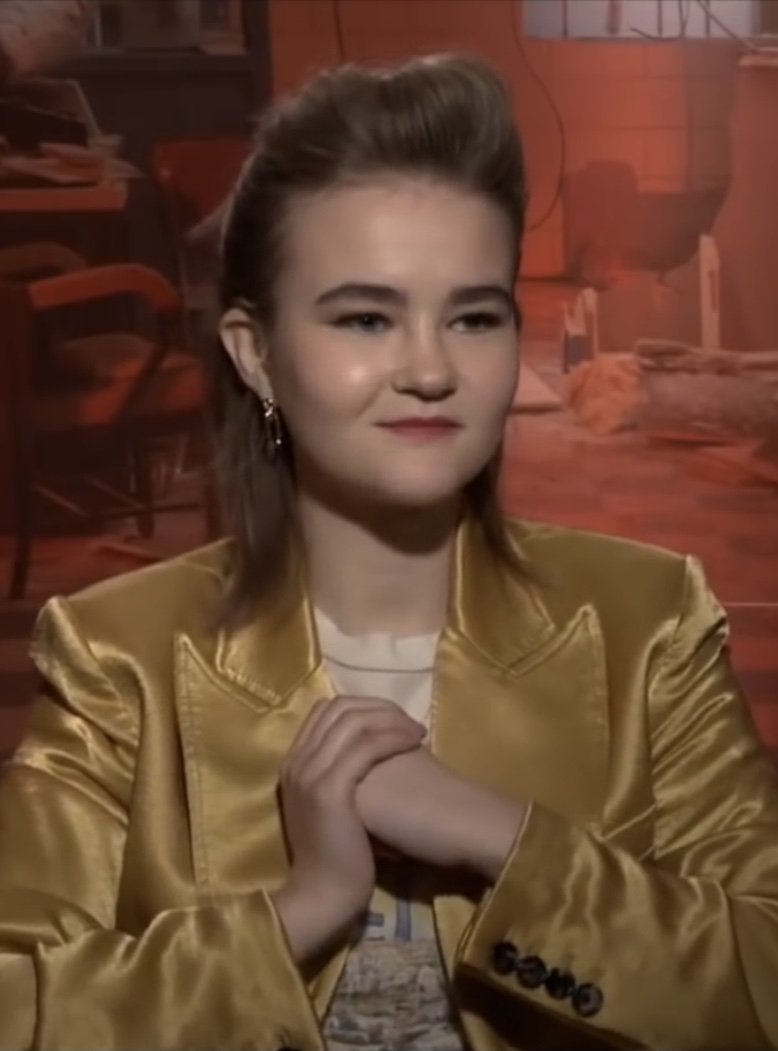
Millicent Simmonds, Best Actress winner

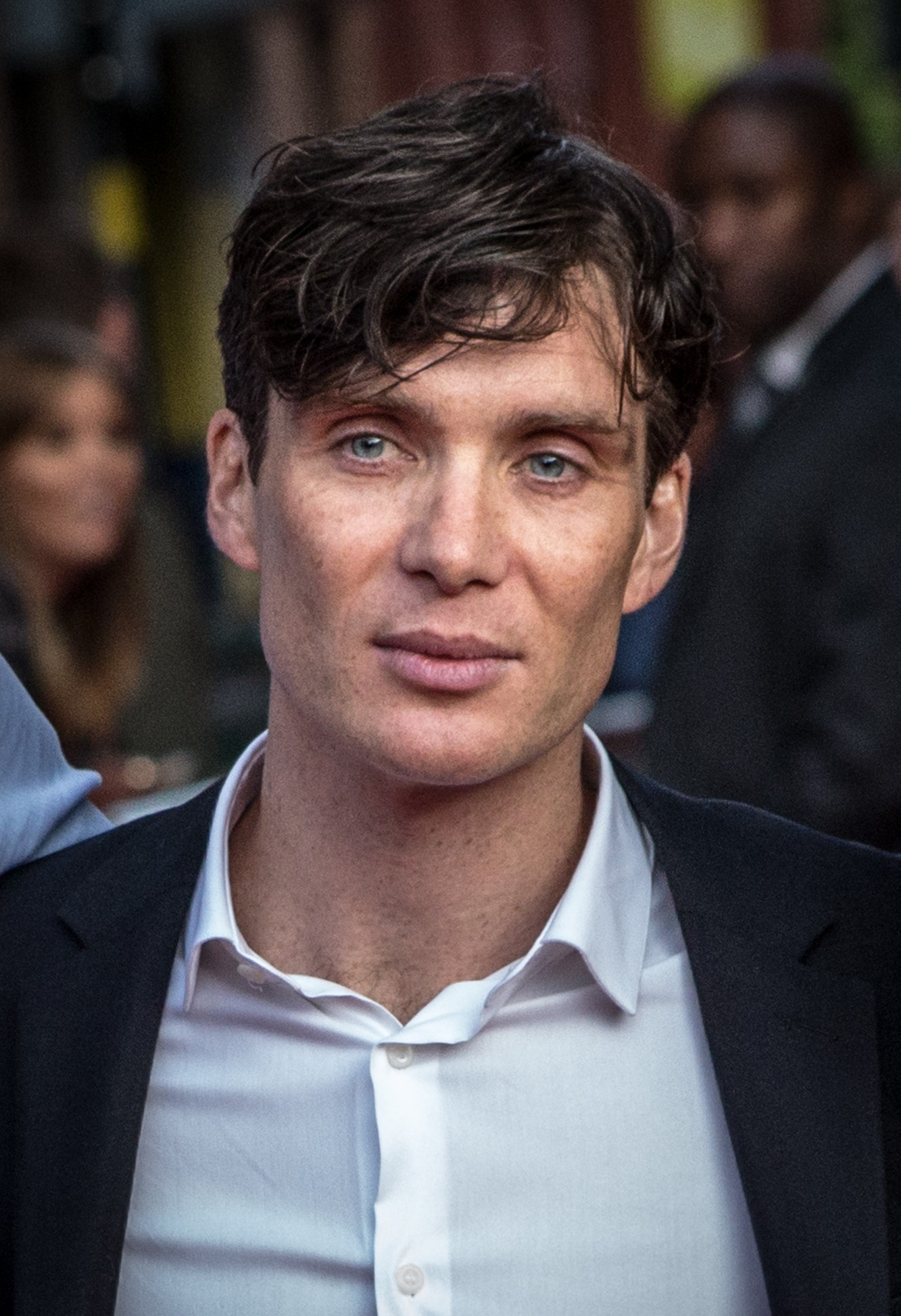
Cillian Murphy, Best Supporting Actor winner

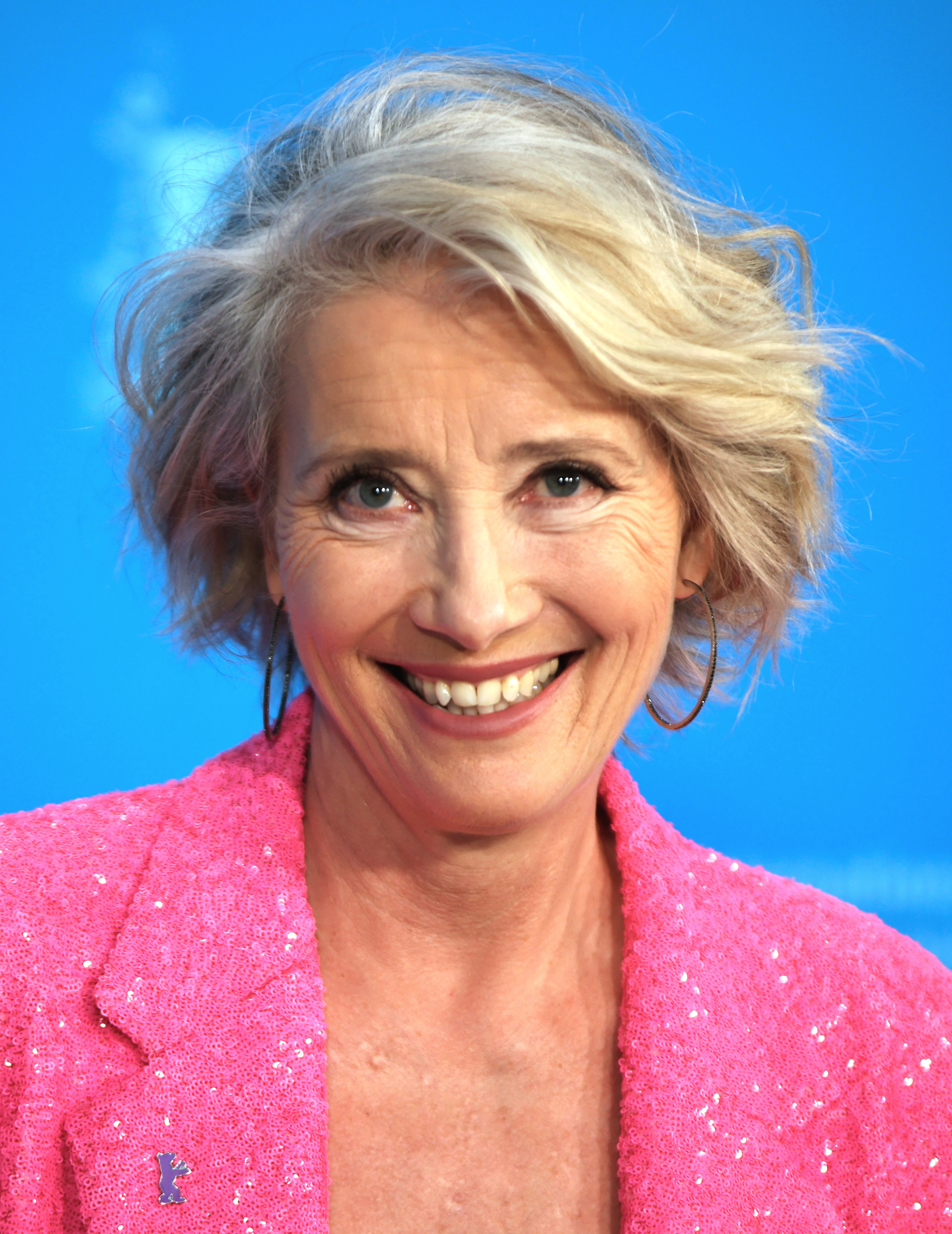
Emma Thompson, Best Supporting Actress winner

**Best Picture**: **In the Heights**; Cruella; The Killing of Two Lovers; Luca; The Mitchells vs. the Machines; Nobody; A Quiet Place Part II; Raya and the Last Dragon; Shiva Baby; The Sparks Brothers	**Best Filmmaker**: **Jon M. Chu – In the Heights**; Emma Seligman – Shiva Baby; John Krasinski – A Quiet Place Part II; Mike Rianda – The Mitchells vs. the Machines; Prano Bailey-Bond – Censor
**Best Actor**: **Anthony Ramos – In the Heights as Usnavi de la Vega**; Clayne Crawford – The Killing of Two Lovers as David; Armando Espitia – I Carry You with Me as Iván; Mads Mikkelsen – Riders of Justice as Marcus; Bob Odenkirk – Nobody as Hutch Mansell	**Best Actress**: **Millicent Simmonds – A Quiet Place Part II as Regan Abbott**; Niamh Algar – Censor as Enid Baines; Melissa Barrera – In the Heights as Vanessa Morales; Rachel Sennott – Shiva Baby as Danielle; Emma Stone – Cruella as Estella / Cruella
**Best Supporting Actor**: **Cillian Murphy – A Quiet Place Part II as Emmett**; Paul Walter Hauser – Cruella as Horace; Corey Hawkins – In the Heights as Benny; Jimmy Smits – In the Heights as Kevin Rosario; Christian Vázquez – I Carry You with Me as Gerardo	**Best Supporting Actress**: **Emma Thompson – Cruella as Baroness von Hellman**; Emily Blunt – A Quiet Place Part II as Evelyn Abbott; Leslie Grace – In the Heights as Nina Rosario; Olga Merediz – In the Heights as Abuela Claudia; Tig Notaro – Army of the Dead as Marianne Peters
**Best Screenplay**: **Mike Rianda and Jeff Rowe – The Mitchells vs. the Machines**; Dana Fox and Tony McNamara – Cruella; Quiara Alegría Hudes – In the Heights; John Krasinski – A Quiet Place Part II; Emma Seligman – Shiva Baby	**Best Indie Film**: **Werewolves Within**; Censor; The Killing of Two Lovers; Shiva Baby; Zola
**Most Anticipated Film**: **Last Night in Soho**; Candyman; The French Dispatch; The Green Knight; No Time to Die

== Films with multiple wins ==
The following films received multiple awards:

Wins	Film
3	In the Heights
2	A Quiet Place Part II

== Films with multiple nominations ==
The following films received multiple nominations:

Nominations	Film
9	In the Heights
6	A Quiet Place Part II
5	Cruella
5	Shiva Baby
3	Censor
3	The Killing of Two Lovers
3	The Mitchells vs. the Machines
2	I Carry You with Me
2	Nobody

== See also ==
- 1st Hollywood Critics Association TV Awards
- 5th Hollywood Critics Association Film Awards
