= The Life of Chuck =

2024 film by Mike Flanagan

- Theatrical release poster
- Directed by: Mike Flanagan
- Screenplay by: Mike Flanagan
- Based on: "The Life of Chuck" by Stephen King
- Produced by: Trevor Macy; Mike Flanagan
- Starring: Tom Hiddleston; Chiwetel Ejiofor; Karen Gillan; Mia Sara; Carl Lumbly; Benjamin Pajak; Jacob Tremblay; Mark Hamill
- Cinematography: Eben Bolter
- Edited by: Mike Flanagan
- Music by: The Newton Brothers
- Production companies: Intrepid Pictures; FilmNation Entertainment; QWGmire; Red Room Pictures
- Distributed by: Neon
- Release dates: September 6, 2024 (TIFF); June 6, 2025 (United States)
- Running time: 111 minutes
- Country: United States
- Language: English
- Box office: $21.4 million

The Life of Chuck is a 2024 American fantasy drama film written for the screen, co-produced, edited, and directed by Mike Flanagan. It is based on the 2020 novella of the same name by Stephen King. The film stars Tom Hiddleston, Chiwetel Ejiofor, Karen Gillan, Mia Sara, Carl Lumbly, Benjamin Pajak, Jacob Tremblay, and Mark Hamill, with narration by Nick Offerman.

The film's plot follows the formative moments in the life of Charles "Chuck" Krantz, chronicled in reverse chronological order, from his death (and the "end of the universe" contained within it) to his childhood.

The Life of Chuck had its premiere at the Toronto International Film Festival on September 6, 2024, where it won the People's Choice Award, and was released in select theaters in the United States by Neon on June 6, 2025, before expanding nationwide on June 13. The film grossed $21.4 million worldwide and received generally positive reviews.

== Plot ==
=== Act Three: Thanks, Chuck ===
Middle school teacher Marty Anderson notes unusual things happening around the world, from natural disasters to the worldwide loss of the Internet. Billboards and advertisements are popping up everywhere, displaying the picture of an accountant named Charles "Chuck" Krantz, with the words "Charles Krantz: 39 Great Years! Thanks, Chuck!" Marty's ex-wife, Felicia Gordon, calls him and they ponder if the end of the universe is upon them. Marty describes Carl Sagan's Cosmic Calendar, a method to visualise the age of the universe in a single calendar year. Both of them begin seeing more disasters and supernatural occurrences.

After losing telephone service and electricity, Marty goes to Felicia's home so they can stay with each other in the universe's final moments, watching as the stars vanish one by one. The end of the universe is revealed to be connected to 39-year-old Chuck, who is bedridden in a hospital, dying from a brain tumor. He is accompanied by his wife, Ginny, and his son, Brian. Chuck dies as Ginny tells him, "39 great years. Thanks, Chuck." Meanwhile, Marty tells Felicia, "I love you", just as the universe appears to abruptly end.

=== Act Two: Buskers Forever ===
Nine months before his death, Chuck is attending a banking conference. While walking outside, he stumbles upon a busking drummer named Taylor Franck, who sees Chuck and begins drumming for him. He is moved to dance on the spot, attracting a crowd. Janice Halliday, a young woman who has been dumped by her boyfriend via text, joins Chuck and they dance together, although he is momentarily hampered by a headache before continuing on to the crowd's joy.

Chuck and Janice help Taylor pack up and the three split the profits at Taylor's insistence. Chuck admits he is unsure why he decided to dance as soon as he heard Taylor playing. Taylor suggests they form a traveling troupe, but he and Janice decline and the three part ways with a group hug. Chuck resumes his day, still pondering on why he danced, but in the coming months, as his health declines, he has the feeling that the world was made just for that moment.

=== Act One: I Contain Multitudes ===
As a young child, Chuck loses his father and pregnant mother in a car crash. He then lives with his paternal grandparents, Albie and Sarah. The bright Sarah teaches Chuck how to enjoy dancing. The sardonic Albie turns to alcohol after his son's death and forbids Chuck to enter the cupola at the top of the house, hinting that he has seen the ghosts of people there before they die. During the conversation about this, a TV in the background is showing Carl Sagan describing the Cosmic Calendar. At school Chuck asks his idealistic teacher, Ms Richards, the meaning of the phrase "I contain multitudes" from the Walt Whitman poem "Song of Myself". Richards explains to him that he contains multitudes, with the memories he gains over the course of his life forming a universe in his head.

Sarah dies after collapsing in a supermarket, worsening Albie's alcoholism. Inspired by his grandmother, Chuck joins his school's dance extracurricular program "Twirlers and Spinners", where he emerges as the best dancer in the club and teaches them how to moonwalk. Chuck has a crush on Cat McCoy, an older and taller girl who is frequently partnered with him. Despite having a boyfriend, she asks him to share a dance at their school's Fall Fling.

Chuck expresses his interest in pursuing dance to his grandfather, but Albie dismisses him and instead encourages him to be an accountant like him, sharing how math is seen in, and necessary in, everything. At the Fall Fling, Chuck is hesitant at first but decides to let loose and dances with Cat in front of the large crowd, earning cheers from everyone, including Marty and Felicia, with the former revealed to be a teacher at Chuck's school. After being kissed by Cat, Chuck dances by himself outside in the school field, but he injures his hand in the process which leaves a scar.

Years later, Albie dies, leaving the teen-aged Chuck to inherit everything, including their house. His maternal grandparents from Omaha travel to stay with him until he goes off to college. Now in possession of the key to the cupola, Chuck finally decides to enter it and sees an apparition of himself on his deathbed as an adult, which he identifies through his scar. Despite this, he dismisses his vision, promising to live life to the fullest, saying, "I am wonderful, I deserve to be wonderful, and I contain multitudes."

== Cast ==
- Tom Hiddleston as Charles "Chuck" Krantz, an accountant who loves dancing
  - Jacob Tremblay as 17-year-old Chuck
  - Benjamin Pajak as 11-year-old Chuck
  - Cody Flanagan as 7-year-old Chuck
- Chiwetel Ejiofor as Marty Anderson, a middle-school teacher and Felicia's ex-husband, later revealed to be a chaperone at Chuck's middle school dance
- Karen Gillan as Felicia Gordon, a nurse and Marty's ex-wife
- Mark Hamill as Albie Krantz, Chuck's "zayde" or paternal grandfather, who is also an accountant
- Mia Sara as Sarah Krantz, Chuck's "bubbe" or paternal grandmother, who inspires Chuck's love for dance
- Nick Offerman as the Narrator
- Carl Lumbly as Sam Yarborough, an elderly mortician Marty encounters, later revealed to be the mortician at Albie's funeral
- Annalise Basso as Janice Halliday, a young woman recovering from a breakup who briefly becomes Chuck's dance partner
- The Pocket Queen as Taylor Franck, a drummer who has dropped out of The Juilliard School
- Andy Grush as Mac, Taylor's busker friend and driver
- Kate Siegel as Miss Richards, an idealistic teacher from Chuck's school
- Samantha Sloyan as Miss Rohrbacher, the head teacher of "Twirlers and Spinners", the dance program of Chuck's school
- Trinity Jo-Li Bliss as Cat McCoy, a girl whom Chuck has a crush on and is his frequent partner at their dance club
- Matthew Lillard as Gus Wilfong, Marty's neighbor
- Rahul Kohli as Bri, Felicia's colleague at the hospital where they work
- Violet McGraw as Iris, a young girl on roller skates Marty encounters while traveling to Felicia's home
- Heather Langenkamp as Vera Stanley, the neighbor of the Krantz family and the neighborhood gossip
- David Dastmalchian as Josh, a single father grieving his wife leaving him
- Harvey Guillén as Hector, a parent of one of Marty's students
- Q'orianka Kilcher as Virginia "Ginny" Krantz, Chuck's wife and Brian's mother
- Antonio Raul Corbo as Brian Krantz, Chuck's teenage son
- Carla Gugino as News and Commercial Voice
- Mike Flanagan as a mourner at Sarah's funeral

== Production ==
In July 2020, Stephen King's novella "The Life of Chuck" was optioned by Darren Aronofsky's production company, Protozoa Pictures. However, in May 2023, it was announced director Mike Flanagan would adapt the story, with Tom Hiddleston and Mark Hamill set to star and with Protozoa no longer involved. FilmNation Entertainment had joined the adaptation as co-producer and would handle international distribution sales to the adaptation. Flanagan had previously helmed adaptations of King's novels, including Gerald's Game (2017) and Doctor Sleep (2019).

=== Filming ===
Filming began in Alabama in October 2023, during the 2023 SAG-AFTRA strike, under a SAG-AFTRA interim agreement. Deadline Hollywood reported Chiwetel Ejiofor, Karen Gillan, and Jacob Tremblay had been added to the cast. Flanagan announced the full cast on his social media a few days later. Filming wrapped on November 16, 2023.

In December 2023, it was revealed that Flanagan would also serve as editor, as he had done in his previous films. In April 2024, the Newton Brothers, frequent collaborators of Flanagan, were announced to be serving as composers.

== Release ==
The Life of Chuck premiered at the Toronto International Film Festival on September 6, 2024. Later that month Neon acquired its North American distribution rights for a summer 2025 theatrical release. The film was released in select theaters in the United States on June 6, 2025, before expanding nationwide on June 13.

== Reception ==
=== Box office ===
During its first weekend of limited release, The Life of Chuck grossed $224,585 from 16 theaters during the weekend of June 6–8. In the United States and Canada, the film opened alongside How to Train Your Dragon, Materialists and The Unholy Trinity, and grossed $2.3 million, finishing 9th at the box office during the weekend of June 13–15.

=== Critical response ===
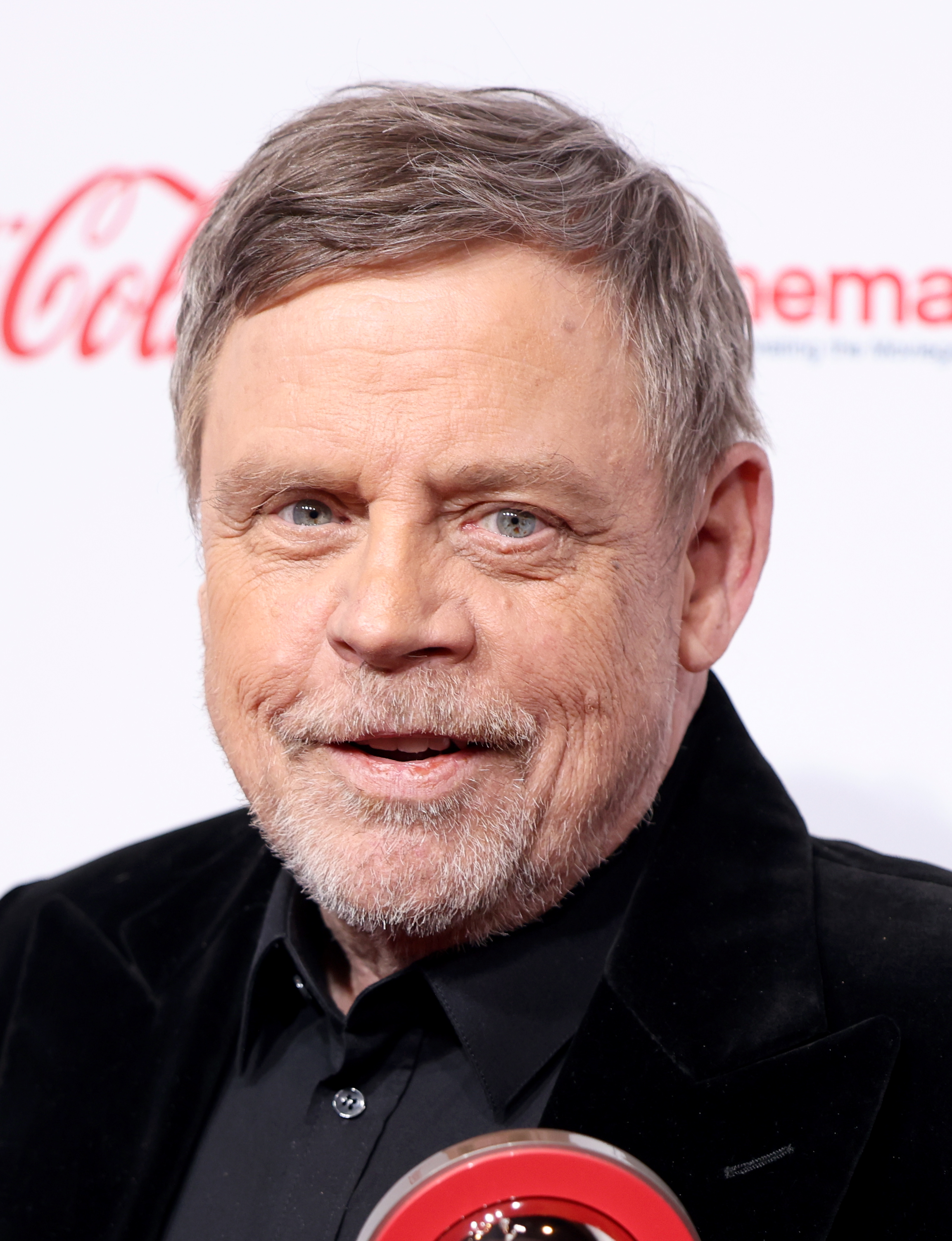
Mark Hamill's performance received widespread acclaim from critics.

On the review aggregator website Rotten Tomatoes, 80% of 298 critics' reviews are positive, with an average rating of 7.5/10. The website's consensus reads: "Showing a sweeter side of director Mike Flanagan's deeply-felt emotional register, The Life of Chuck is a buoyant and often wonderful adaptation of one of Stephen King's more cosmically optimistic tales." Metacritic, which uses a weighted average, assigned the film a score of 67 out of 100, based on 42 critics, indicating "generally favorable" reviews.

The Life of Chuck was named the "Best Movie of 2025" by The Boston Globe, USA Today, and The Washington Post. Conversely, Peter Debruge of Variety named it the "Worst Movie of 2025", writing, "Flanagan serv[es] up contrived, fortune-cookie aphorisms about how even the most one-dimensional among us 'contain multitudes' [...] Leaving no room for audiences to draw their own conclusions, the emotional manipulation starts with the Newton Brothers' heavy-handed piano-and-strings score, which punctuates every faux-profound moment with a plunk."

Matt Zoller Seitz of RogerEbert.com awarded the film 4 out of 4 stars. Seitz described the film as a "great example of popular cinema's ability to speak to the life experiences of a large cross-section of viewers without dumbing anything down". Thomas Floyd of The Washington Post praised the plot as containing "love, grief and a dash of the supernatural", while also lauding the acting of Mia Sara and Mark Hamill.

In a negative review from The New York Times, Manohla Dargis wrote "some fairy tales are better left on the page". She felt that the film "uneasily mixes moods and tones" and the film became increasingly unrealistic in the second half. A critic for NPR, Justin Chang, criticized the film as "dumping exposition in scene after scene" and said "its ultimately life-affirming message comes together in a surprisingly lifeless way".

=== Accolades ===
At the 2024 Toronto International Film Festival, the film won the People's Choice Award. (Note: It is the first film since Where Do We Go Now? (2011) to win this award and not go on to receive a nomination for the Academy Award for Best Picture.)

Award	Date of ceremony	Category	Recipient	Result	Ref.
Astra Film Awards	January 9, 2026	Best Book to Screen Adaptation	The Life of Chuck	Nominated	
Astra Film Awards	January 9, 2026	Best Voice Over Performance	Nick Offerman	Nominated	
Astra Midseason Movie Awards	July 3, 2025	Best Picture	The Life of Chuck	Runner-up	
Astra Midseason Movie Awards	July 3, 2025	Best Director	Mike Flanagan	Runner-up	
Astra Midseason Movie Awards	July 3, 2025	Best Supporting Actor	Mark Hamill	Runner-up	
Astra Midseason Movie Awards	July 3, 2025	Best Screenplay	Mike Flanagan	Runner-up	
Kansas City Film Critics Circle	December 21, 2025	Best Adapted Screenplay	Mike Flanagan	Nominated	
Phoenix Film Critics Society	December 15, 2025	Top 10 Films	The Life of Chuck	Won (Note: This award does not have a single winner, but recognizes multiple films.)	
Phoenix Film Critics Society	December 15, 2025	The Overlooked Film of the Year	The Life of Chuck	Won	
Saturn Awards	March 8, 2026	Best Fantasy Film	The Life of Chuck	Nominated	
Saturn Awards	March 8, 2026	Best Actor in a Film	Tom Hiddleston	Nominated	
SCAD Savannah Film Festival	November 1, 2025	Lifetime Achievement Award	Mark Hamill	Honored	
Sitges Film Festival	October 18, 2025	Best Feature Film	The Life of Chuck	Nominated	
Sitges Film Festival	October 18, 2025	José Luis Guarner Critics' Award for Best Film	The Life of Chuck	Won (Note: Tied with Reflection in a Dead Diamond.)	
Toronto International Film Festival	September 15, 2024	People's Choice Award	The Life of Chuck	Won	
