= Alfie Williams =

English child actor (born 2011)

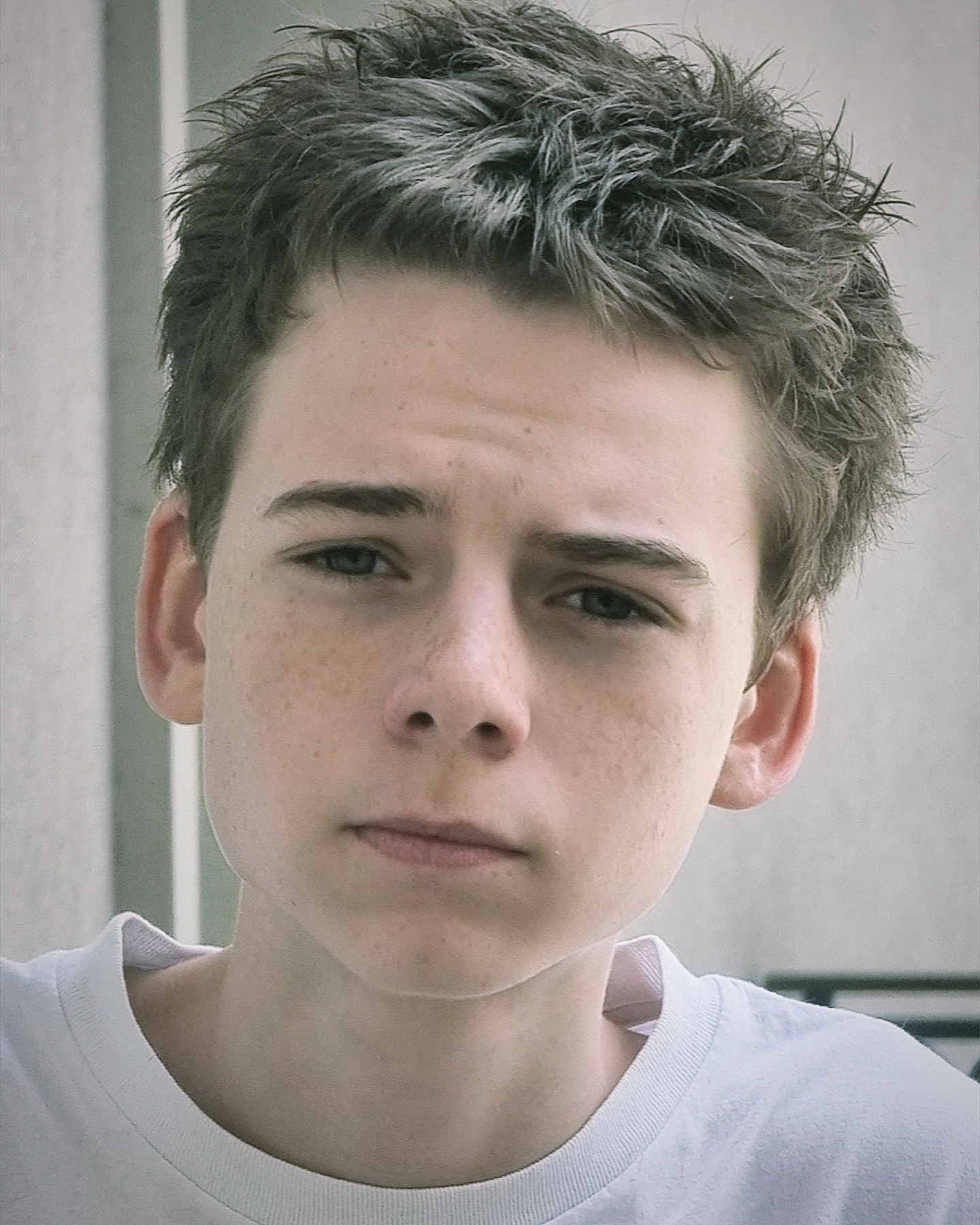
- Williams in 2025
- Born: 3 January 2011 (age 15); Newcastle upon Tyne, England
- Occupation: Actor
- Years active: 2021–present

Alfie Williams (born 3 January 2011) is an English child actor. He portrayed the young survivor Spike in the film 28 Years Later (2025) and its 2026 follow-up 28 Years Later: The Bone Temple. He was named Young British/Irish Performer of the Year by the London Film Critics' Circle and a 2026 Brit to Watch by Variety.

== Early life and education ==
Alfie Williams was born in Newcastle upon Tyne, England, on 3 January 2011. He has a younger sister, Mollie. He has lived and attended school near Newcastle upon Tyne. His father, actor Alfie Dobson, became Williams's main inspiration.

From an early age he showed an interest in acting. At age six, he played Scrooge in a school production of Dickens's A Christmas Carol, for which he studied the classic film adaptation and worked hard on his accent. The experience solidified his desire to pursue acting as a career.

Williams attended a drama school but soon left because it focused too much on musicals, while he was more interested in film and television. From the age of seven, he actively attended auditions, which quickly earned him his first roles in commercials.

== Career ==
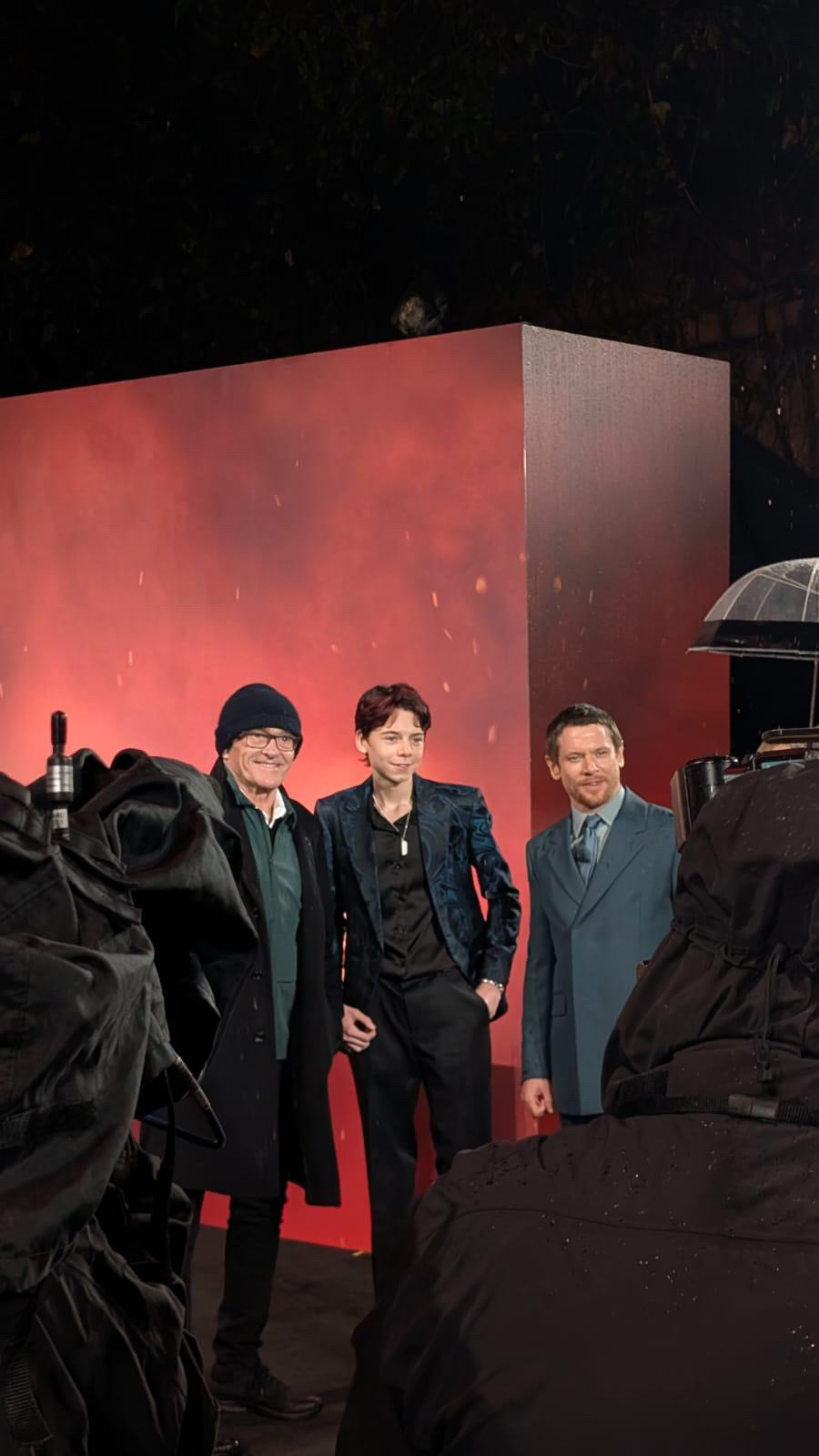
Williams with producer Danny Boyle and co-star Jack O'Connell at the 28 Years Later: The Bone Temple premiere in London.

Williams's career began with small roles in commercials and short films. In 2021, Williams made his debut in the short film Phallacy, acting alongside Stephen Graham and Shaun Parkes. This role became a turning point in his career, as Graham's recommendation led him to sign with the talent agency Independent Talent Group.

In 2022, he had a small role as the ghost Theo in the third season of fantasy television series His Dark Materials. In the same year, he also appeared in BBC Radio 4's serial Our Friends in the North. Williams also acted in the film A New Breed of Criminal.

Williams played Spike in the post-apocalyptic horror film 28 Years Later (2025), his first major screen role. He was 13 years old at the time of filming, and he went through four rounds of auditions to get the role. He was described as the "indisputable protagonist" of the film by The Hollywood Reporter, an "outstanding new talent" by Empire, and "excellent" in the role by The Times. According to British GQ, "Williams shows off excellent emotional range throughout the film, especially as the film tonally shifts from visceral horror to bittersweet tragedy".

Williams reprised his role as Spike in the sequel 28 Years Later: The Bone Temple, which commenced production three weeks after filming wrapped on 28 Years Later. In November 2025, it was announced that Williams will star in the thriller film Banquet, directed by Galder Gaztelu-Urrutia, alongside Meghann Fahy, Corey Mylchreest, and Finbar Lynch, and will be produced by David Yates.

== Personal life ==
One of Williams's main hobbies is playing the guitar, a passion that began after his 28 Years Later co-star Aaron Taylor-Johnson gifted him a vintage acoustic guitar. He is a fan of Kurt Cobain, the rock band Nirvana, and grunge music in general. In addition to music, he lists video games among his hobbies, with Red Dead Redemption, Ghost of Tsushima, and Dead by Daylight among his favourites.

As of July 2025, Williams lives in Gateshead, near Newcastle upon Tyne, with his family. He is being homeschooled.

== Filmography ==
Key
†	Denotes films that have not yet been released

Film and Television
Year	Title	Role	Notes	Ref.
2021	Phallacy	Bo Williams	Short film	
2022	His Dark Materials	Ghost Theo	Episode: "No Way Out"	
2023	A New Breed of Criminal	Young John Henry Sayers		
2025	28 Years Later	Spike		
2026	28 Years Later: The Bone Temple	Spike		
TBA	Banquet †	TBA	Filming	

== Awards and nominations ==
Year	Award	Category	Work	Result	Ref.
2025	Astra Midseason Movie Awards	Best Actor	28 Years Later	Nominated	
2025	Digital Spy Reader Awards	Best British Rising Star	28 Years Later	Won	
2025	San Diego Film Critics Society	Best Youth Performance	28 Years Later	Nominated	
2025	Seattle Film Critics Society	Best Youth Performance	28 Years Later	Nominated	
2026	Astra Film Awards	Best Performance in a Horror or Thriller	28 Years Later	Nominated	
2026	London Film Critics' Circle	Young British/Irish Performer of the Year	28 Years Later	Won	
