= 28 Years Later =

2025 film by Danny Boyle

- Theatrical release poster
- Directed by: Danny Boyle
- Written by: Alex Garland
- Produced by: Andrew Macdonald; Peter Rice; Bernie Bellew; Danny Boyle; Alex Garland
- Starring: Jodie Comer; Aaron Taylor-Johnson; Jack O'Connell; Alfie Williams; Ralph Fiennes
- Cinematography: Anthony Dod Mantle
- Edited by: Jon Harris
- Music by: Young Fathers
- Production companies: Columbia Pictures; Decibel Films; DNA Films
- Distributed by: Sony Pictures Releasing
- Release dates: 19 June 2025 (United Kingdom); 20 June 2025 (United States)
- Running time: 115 minutes
- Countries: United Kingdom; United States
- Language: English
- Budget: $60 million
- Box office: $151.3 million

28 Years Later is a 2025 post-apocalyptic coming-of-age horror film produced and directed by Danny Boyle, and written by Alex Garland. The third instalment in the 28 Days Later film series, it stars Jodie Comer, Aaron Taylor-Johnson, Jack O'Connell, Alfie Williams, and Ralph Fiennes. The film tells the story of a boy living in a post-apocalyptic world who undertakes a hazardous journey with his ill mother in an effort to obtain medical treatment for her.

28 Years Later marks the returns of Boyle, Garland and cinematographer Anthony Dod Mantle to the film series. Cillian Murphy, who starred in the first film, served as executive producer. The film was shot back-to-back with its sequel, 28 Years Later: The Bone Temple, which was directed by Nia DaCosta and released in January 2026.

28 Years Later was released in the United Kingdom and the United States by Sony Pictures Releasing on 20 June 2025. The film received positive reviews from critics and grossed $151 million worldwide against a budget of $60 million, becoming the highest-grossing film in the franchise.

== Plot ==
During the initial outbreak of the Rage Virus, (Note: As depicted in 28 Days Later (2002)) a young boy, Jimmy Crystal, flees his house in the Scottish Highlands as his family is attacked by the Infected. He takes refuge in the local church with his father, a minister, but finds him praying in ecstasy, interpreting the virus as a harbinger of the end times. Jimmy's father gives him a crucifix necklace and helps him to safety before submitting to the Infected as they break in.

Twenty-eight years later, the Rage Virus has been successfully eradicated from continental Europe after reaching Paris during its second outbreak, (Note: As depicted in 28 Weeks Later (2007)) leaving the British Isles under indefinite quarantine with few survivors. A civilised community has been subsisting on Lindisfarne, an island defended naturally from Great Britain by a causeway that floods with the tide. Among the inhabitants of Lindisfarne are Jamie, a scavenger; his wife, Isla, who has undiagnosed cancer; and their twelve-year-old son, Spike.

Jamie and Spike cross to mainland Britain for a coming-of-age hunting ritual. They find an Infected man who has been tied up and branded with the name "Jimmy". Spike kills an Infected for the first time. Jamie and Spike then escape a pack of Infected led by an "Alpha," an evolved Infected that is stronger and more intelligent than the others. Jamie and Spike shelter overnight in the attic of a run-down cottage, where Spike observes foreign boats on quarantine patrol and a fire farther inland. When the attic collapses, the Alpha pursues Jamie and Spike across the partially inundated causeway and nearly catches up to them. The village sentries kill the Alpha with a ballista.

The village throws a party for Spike to celebrate his first kill. Spike is upset by Jamie's embellishment of his deeds and discovers his affair with Rosey, the village schoolteacher. He discusses the fire with a family friend, Sam, who suggests it was made by Dr Ian Kelson, a former GP in exile. The next morning, Spike confronts Jamie for his unwillingness to seek medical care for Isla and for his infidelity. Jamie insists that Kelson, whom he once witnessed burning corpses en masse, is too mentally unstable to help.

Unconvinced, Spike and Isla escape the island and journey to mainland Britain. There, they are rescued from a pack of Infected by Swedish Navy seaman Erik Sundqvist, the sole survivor of a shipwrecked NATO quarantine patrol boat. Isla discovers a pregnant Infected in labour and helps her deliver an uninfected baby girl. When the Infected becomes violent, Erik shoots her and threatens to kill Isla and Spike if they don't let him kill the newborn too. An Alpha appears and decapitates Erik.

Spike and Isla flee with the newborn and Spike shoots the Alpha with arrows. Just as the Alpha catches up with Spike, Dr Kelson appears and temporarily sedates the Alpha (whom he has named Samson) with a blowgun and a morphine-xylazine dart. Kelson leads Spike and Isla to the Bone Temple, an ossuary he has constructed out of cleaned bones belonging to both fallen survivors and the Infected. He explains the funerary concept of memento mori and incorporates Erik's skull into the Temple.

Kelson examines Isla and deduces that she has advanced terminal cancer. Kelson consoles a devastated Spike with the phrase memento amoris, which means "remember, you must love." Isla and Spike share their last moments together, and Isla allows Kelson to euthanise her. Kelson gives Isla's skull to Spike to place at the top of the Temple.

When Samson rampages through Kelson's sanctuary, Spike subdues him with a tranquilliser dart and saves Kelson's life. Kelson encourages Spike to take the infant home. Instead, Spike leaves her at the village gate and returns to the mainland, still disillusioned. Jamie reads a note from Spike that reveals he has named the infant after Isla and promises that he will return when he is ready. Jamie tries to follow Spike to the mainland but is blocked by the rising tide.

Twenty-eight days later, Spike is rescued from a pack of Infected by an adult Jimmy Crystal, who now leads a bizarre cult of violent chavs wearing coloured tracksuits and peroxide blond wigs. Jimmy introduces himself to Spike and encourages him to join Jimmy's group.

== Cast ==
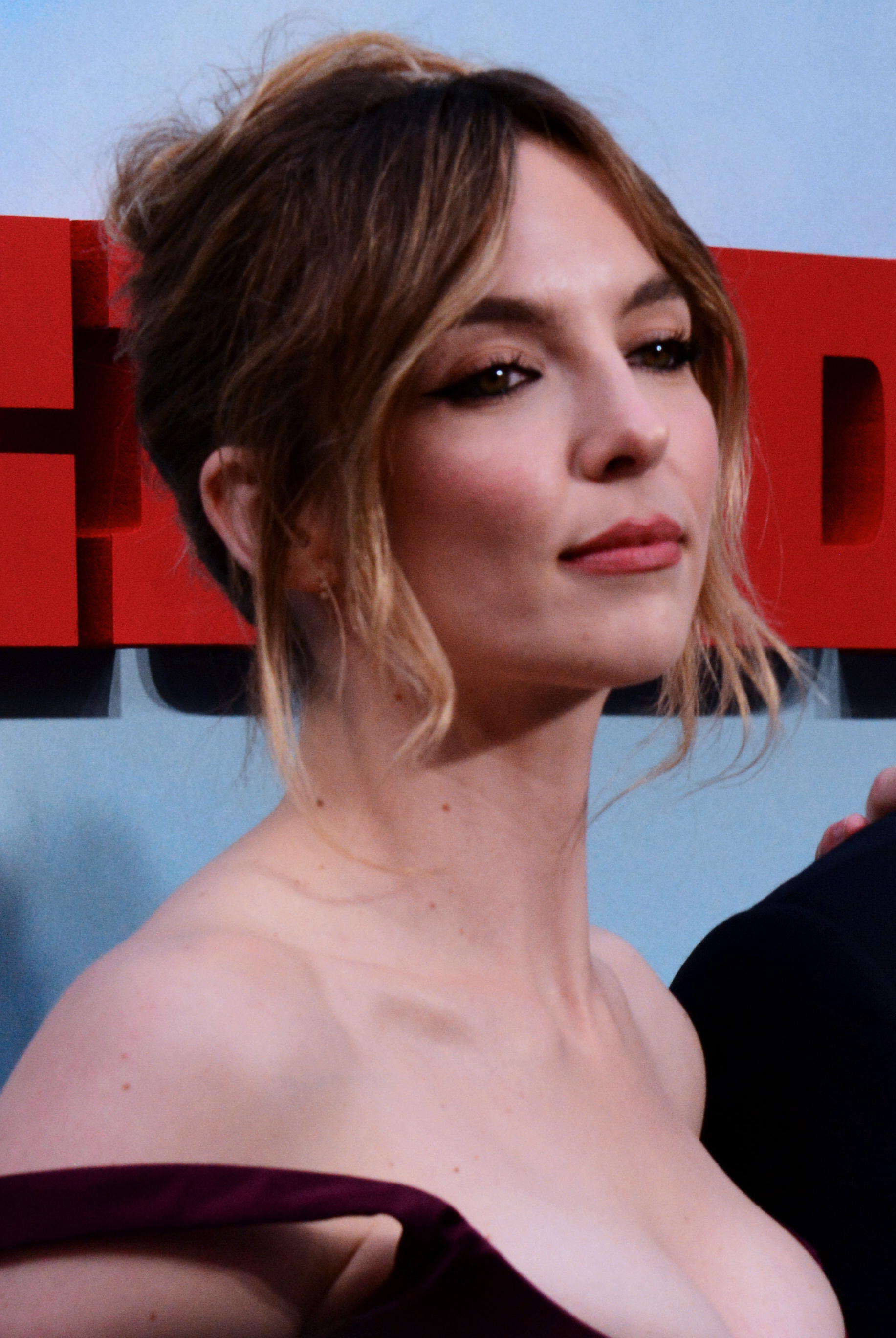
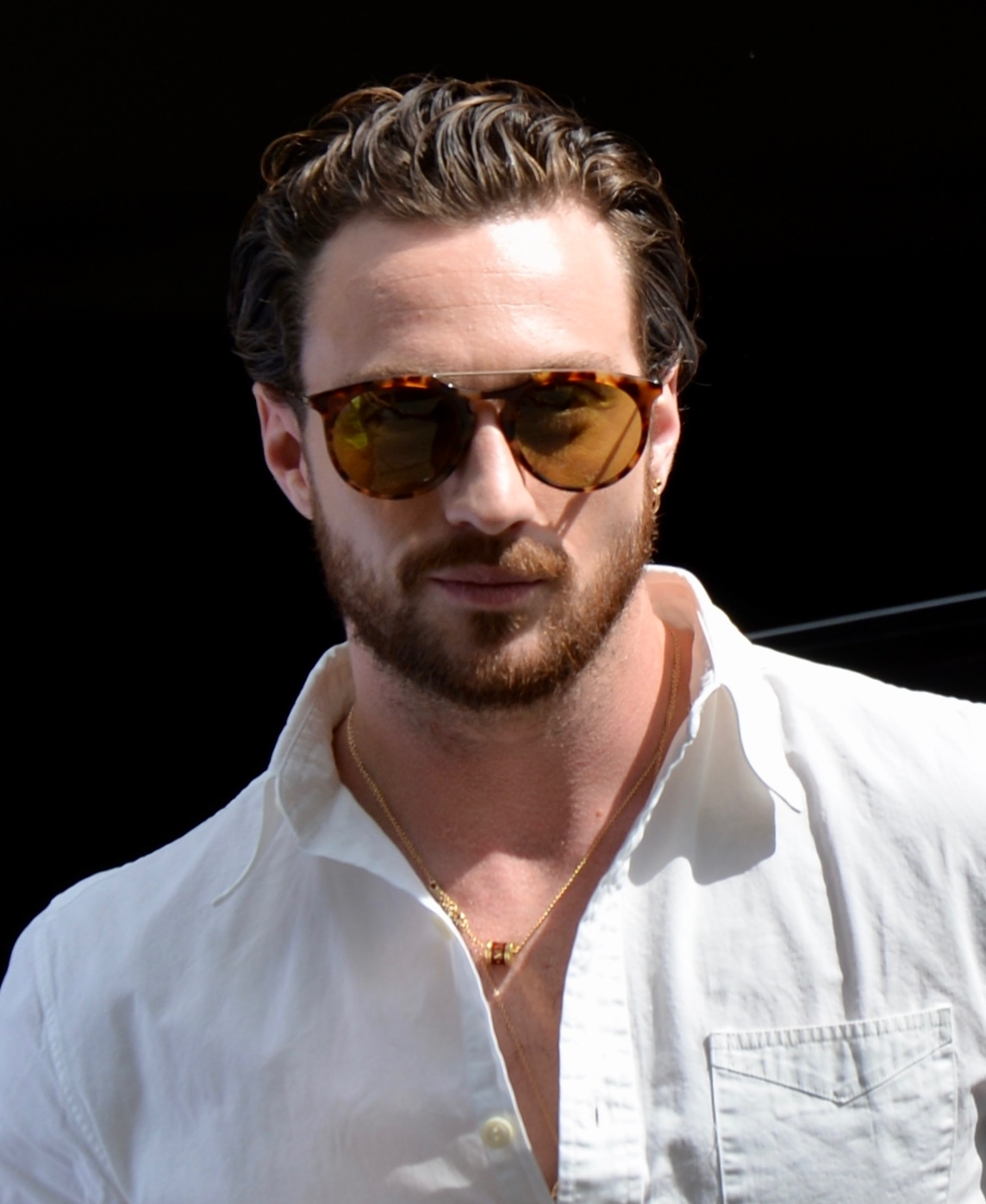
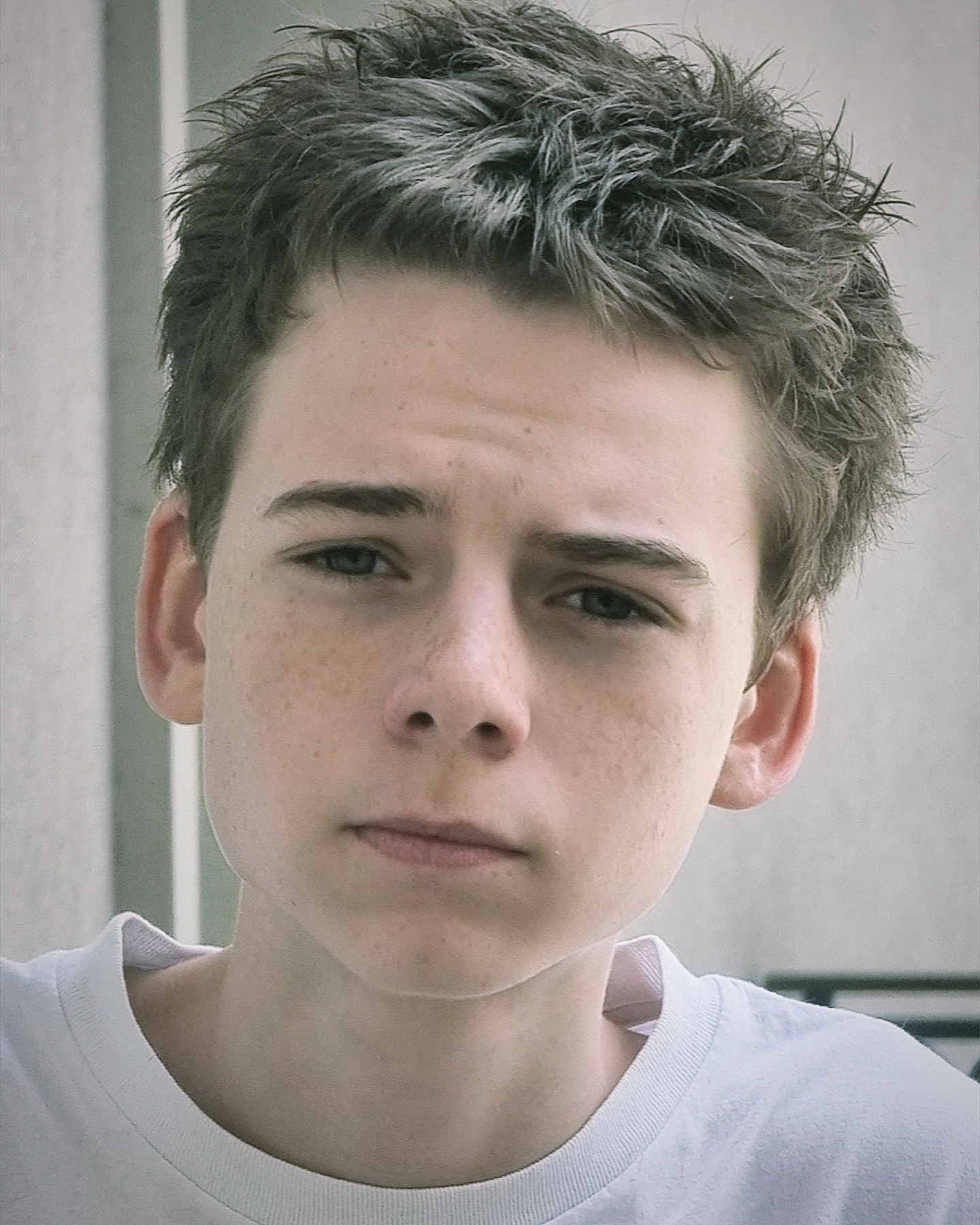
Jodie Comer, Aaron Taylor-Johnson, and Alfie Williams star as a family in the film.
- Jodie Comer as Isla, Jamie's wife who is battling a mysterious illness
- Aaron Taylor-Johnson as Jamie, a scavenger and Isla's husband
- Jack O'Connell as Sir Lord Jimmy Crystal, the leader of the Jimmy Savile–inspired "Jimmy" cult and a survivor of the original outbreak
  - Rocco Haynes as Young Jimmy Crystal
- Alfie Williams as Spike, Jamie and Isla's 12-year-old son
- Chi Lewis-Parry as "Samson", a physically imposing Alpha leader of the infected
- Edvin Ryding as Erik Sundqvist, a Swedish Amphibious Corps soldier
- Christopher Fulford as Sam, a friend of Jamie's and a resident on the island
- Stella Gonet as Jenny, a member of the island's leadership council
- Ralph Fiennes as Dr Ian Kelson, a former doctor and survivor of the outbreak

Featured as the members of Jimmy's cult are Robert Rhodes as Jimmy Jimmy, Erin Kellyman as Jimmy Ink, Connor Newall as Jimmy Shite, Sam Locke as Jimmy Fox, Maura Bird as Jimmy Jones, Ghazi Al Ruffai as Jimmy Snake, and Emma Laird as Jimmima.

== Themes ==
Boyle and Garland have said that 28 Years Later explores themes of British isolationism and cultural decline, with the film's quarantined Britain reflecting a broader sense of political and cultural detachment following Brexit and the COVID-19 pandemic.

The island community in the film represents a post-progressive return to regressivism, where society shifts away from forward-looking ideals and instead toward nostalgic myths rooted in a misremembered past. A montage blending authentic British wartime footage with scenes from the film Henry V (1944), set to Taylor Holmes' 1915 recording of the 1903 poem "Boots" by Rudyard Kipling, reflects the filmmakers' intention to depict how the isolated community reconstructs a cultural mythology from fragmented and partially remembered aspects of Britain's past. The sequence illustrates how narratives such as the Battle of Agincourt or the Blitz become distorted through transmission, evolving into instinctive half-truths rather than historically accurate accounts.

The characters' increasing risk-taking over time since the initial rage virus outbreak mirrors society's gradual relaxation of COVID-19 precautions despite ongoing risks.

== Production ==
=== Development ===
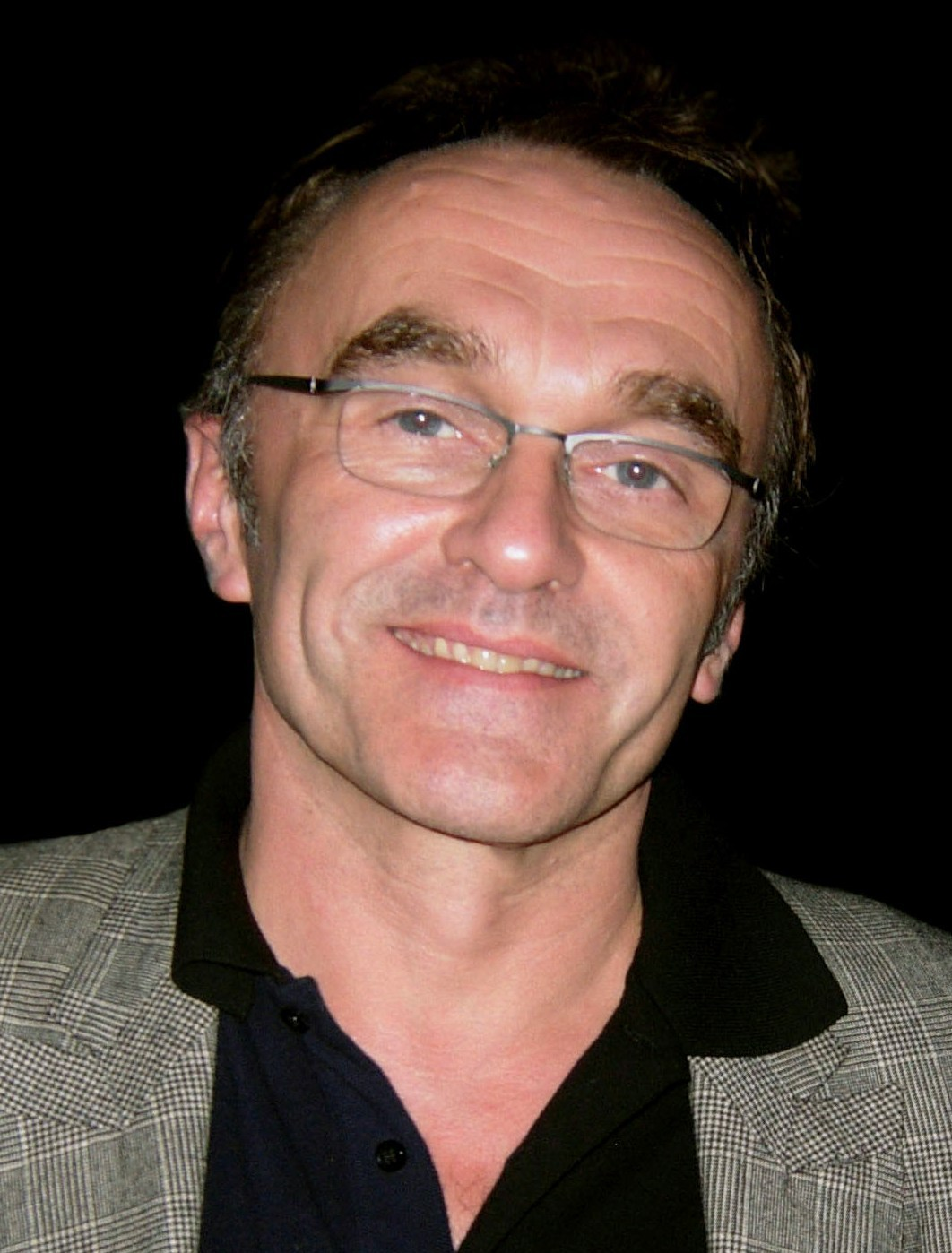
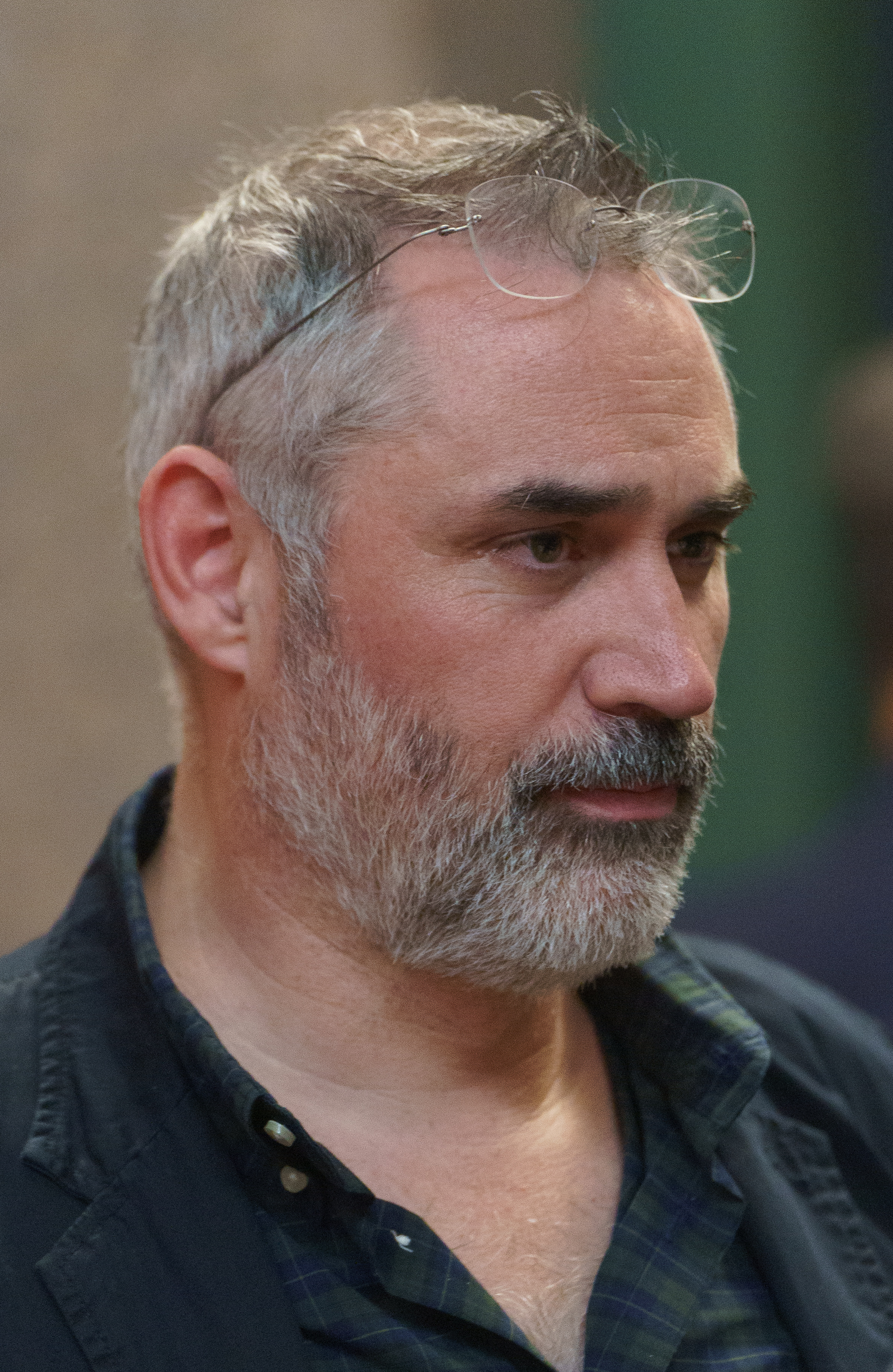
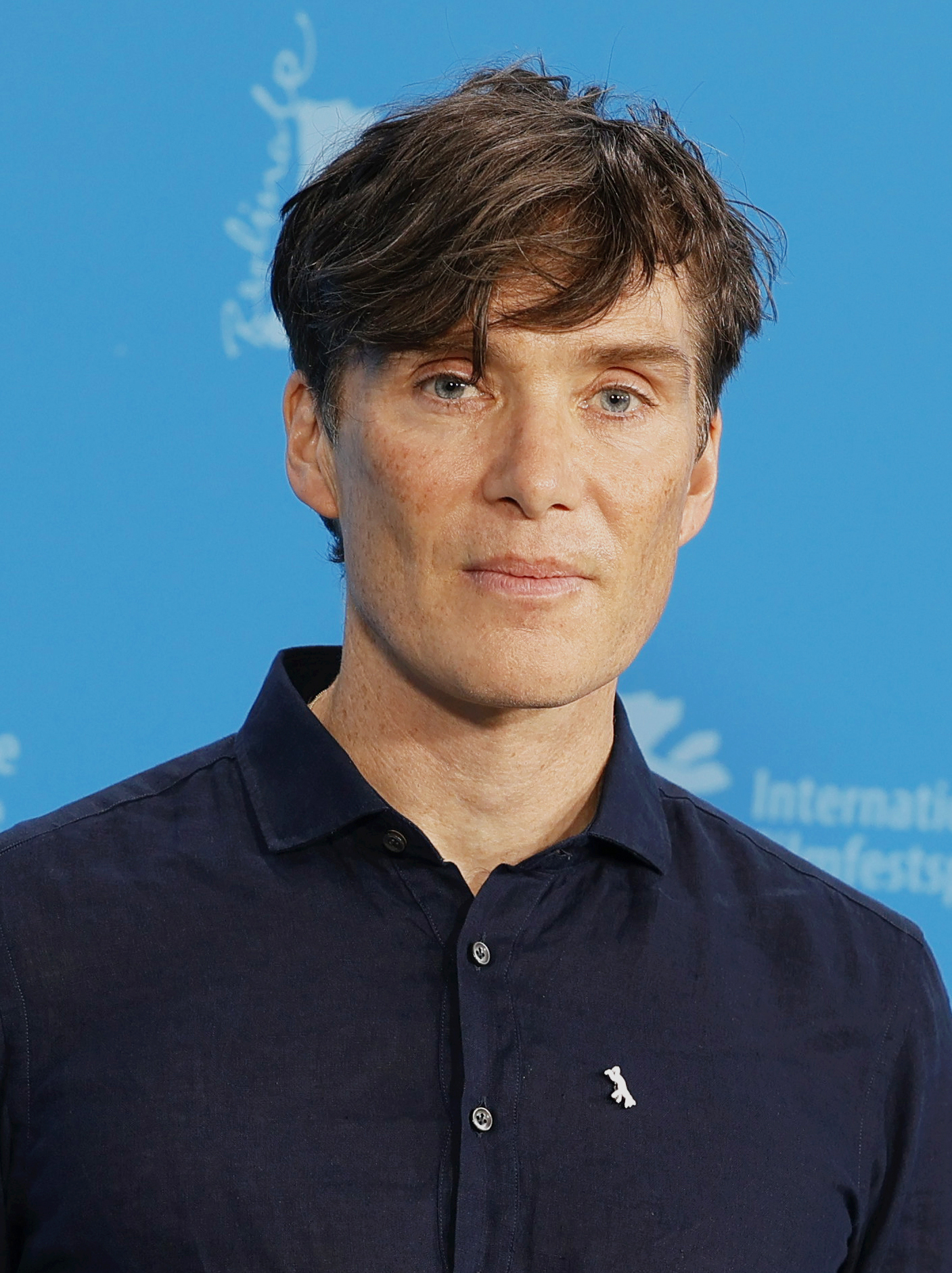
28 Years Later saw the returns of Danny Boyle and Alex Garland to their respective roles as director and screenwriter from 28 Days Later. Cillian Murphy, who portrayed the lead role of Jim in 28 Days Later, returned as an executive producer.

In June 2007, Fox Atomic confirmed development on a third 28 Days Later film, dependent upon the financial performance of 28 Weeks Later following its home video release. In July of the same year, Danny Boyle said that the story for a third instalment had been mapped out. By October 2010, Alex Garland stated that due to differences involving the film rights, the project had been delayed. In January 2011, Boyle stated that he believed the project would be realised, confirming further developments for the story. By April 2013, however, the filmmaker expressed uncertainty as to whether the movie would be made. In January 2015, Garland addressed the project's status, confirming that while it had fallen into development hell there were serious discussions going on behind the scenes to produce the project. Reiterating that development was progressing, he stated that the script he was working on was tentatively titled 28 Months Later. In June 2019, Boyle confirmed that he and Garland had been working on the third instalment. In March 2020, Imogen Poots expressed interest in reprising her role from 28 Weeks Later, followed by Cillian Murphy in May 2021.

In November 2022, Boyle, Garland and Murphy all indicated their interest in making a sequel to 28 Days Later. In June 2023, Boyle and Garland expressed in collaboration their intentions to "seriously" and "diligently" see the project enter production; while announcing that the script was now titled 28 Years Later, acknowledging the years it had taken to be developed. Boyle stated that he would like to serve as director, unless Garland chooses to. By July of the same year, Murphy stated that he had recently discussed the possibility of a third film with Boyle; once again expressing interest in reprising his role if Boyle and Garland return to the franchise in their creative roles. Garland originally wrote a spec script for a 28 Months Later, in which the rage virus had been weaponised by a military force, prompting a team of Chinese special forces to search for the original laboratory where the virus was developed in order to create a vaccine, with the whole film to be presented in subtitled Mandarin Chinese. However, Boyle disapproved of the script, as he felt the idea of weaponising the virus was an overused horror film trope, drawing comparison to the Alien film series. After the script was dropped, Garland said he decided to make the story "much stranger ... much odder". He stated that the new story had a connection to The Last of Us, and that the game had "such an impact" on him.

In January 2024, it was announced that a third film titled 28 Years Later was officially in development; with plans for the project to be the first of a new trilogy of sequels. Danny Boyle directed the first instalment, with a script written by Alex Garland; while the latter will also write the scripts for each of the planned sequels. Boyle, Garland, Andrew Macdonald, Peter Rice, and Bernie Bellew all served as the producers. In February of the same year, Murphy discussed his potential involvement with the project; that same month, it was reported that the rights to the first film had reverted to Macdonald from Searchlight Pictures, while the rights to the 2007 sequel remains at 20th Century Studios. He promptly sold the first film's distribution rights to Sony Pictures (after winning a highly competitive studio bidding war, beating out Warner Bros. Pictures, Universal Pictures, and Paramount Pictures), as well as rights to future sequels. (Note: Film rights to Weeks remain at 20th Century Studios.) In March 2024, Garland confirmed that he is writing a trilogy of sequel films. The following month, Garland said the 1969 film Kes was a major influence. Murphy was revealed as an executive producer later that month. The film was produced by Columbia Pictures, Decibel Films, and DNA Films, with funding support from TSG Entertainment.

=== Casting ===
In April 2024, Aaron Taylor-Johnson, Jodie Comer and Ralph Fiennes were cast to star, with Jack O'Connell joining the cast in May. It was initially reported that Cillian Murphy would reprise his role as Jim, but in January 2025, the film's producer Andrew Macdonald confirmed he would not appear, though he remains an executive producer. Erin Kellyman was cast in June 2024.

=== Filming ===
Principal photography began on 7 May 2024 in Northumberland, with Anthony Dod Mantle serving as the cinematographer. Filming wrapped on 29 July. The film was primarily shot using an iPhone 15 Pro Max, in addition to action cameras, drones, and other digital and film cameras. The use of small digital cameras harks back to filming the original 28 Days Later using the Canon XL-1 digital camcorder, which was manoeuvrable enough to film the deserted locales within the time limits allowed by officials. The film was shot in a 2.76:1 aspect ratio, reminiscent of productions using Ultra Panavision 70, which was chosen to emphasise the unpredictability of the infected and to heighten tension by compelling viewers to "keep scanning" the wide frame.

Scenes were shot at 4K resolution at up to 60 frames per-second, and in some scenes the actors performed their own camera work. Some shots employed a bullet time effect, created using a custom-built circular rig equipped with eight to twenty iPhone cameras. This setup also allowed scenes to be filmed from multiple angles simultaneously, giving director Danny Boyle greater flexibility during editing. Boyle explained that using iPhones allowed the crew to film with minimal equipment, providing easier access to the rural landscapes of Northumberland while minimising environmental impact and helping to preserve the area's natural appearance. The iPhone's default camera software posed some challenges for filming because its automatic focus tended to prioritise the brightest or most prominent object in the frame rather than the intended point of dramatic focus, requiring manual overrides to achieve the desired cinematic effect.

Filming mainly took place in the north of England, in the North East and Yorkshire and the Humber regions. Locations include Lindisfarne off the Northumberland Coast, Hexham, Bellingham, Kielder Forest, Rothbury (Northumberland), Newcastle upon Tyne (Tyne and Wear), Waskerley (County Durham), Melsonby, Ripon, Fountains Abbey, Aysgarth Falls, Redmire (North Yorkshire) and Bradford (West Yorkshire). Some scenes were filmed at Plankey Mill Farm, near Langley and Bardon Mill (Northumberland). Additional filming took place in Cheddar Gorge in Somerset. Although the Sycamore Gap tree was felled by vandals in 2023, it was digitally reconstructed for the film, as within the film's alternate timeline the vandalism is presumed to never have taken place.

The infected characters in the film are depicted in the nude; however, according to Boyle, the actors portraying those characters were required by law to cover their own genitalia with prosthetic genitalia due to the presence of child actor Alfie Williams on the set.

=== Music ===
In May 2025, Young Fathers was confirmed in composing the film's soundtrack, succeeding previous composer John Murphy. The soundtrack was released on Milan Records on 20 June 2025.

== Release ==
28 Years Later premiered in a special day-ahead preview on 19 June 2025 at the Tyneside Cinema in Newcastle upon Tyne, attended by director Boyle and local actor Williams, as well numerous crew, service providers and extras from across the surrounding Northumberland area who were involved in the location shooting of the film. It was released in the United Kingdom, United States and Canada by Sony Pictures Releasing through its Columbia Pictures label on 20 June 2025.

The full 1915 recording of Taylor Holmes' recital of "Boots" that was used in edited form in the film's first and second trailers, as well as during the film

The first trailer was released on 10 December 2024. It features the 1903 poem "Boots" by Rudyard Kipling, recited by American actor Taylor Holmes in 1915. The trailer became #1 trending on YouTube, and in 48 hours had over 10 million views. Stuart Heritage, the film critic for The Guardian, particularly noted the use of Holmes's spoken-word recording of "Boots" and commented: "As of now, though, it's just about the most exciting film of 2025. And this is entirely down to its trailer." The trailer's viral success led to Sony's decision to re-release the original 28 Days Later film on digital platforms on 18 December 2024.

=== Home media ===
28 Years Later was released on digital platforms by Sony Pictures Home Entertainment on 29 July 2025 and was released on 4K Ultra HD Blu-ray, Blu-ray and DVD on 23 September 2025.

== Reception ==
=== Box office ===
28 Years Later grossed $70.4 million in the United States and Canada, and $80.9 million in other territories, for a worldwide total of $151.3 million.

In the United States and Canada, 28 Years Later was released alongside Elio, and was expected to gross around $30 million in its opening weekend from 3,444 theatres, with some estimates going as high as $45 million. The film made $14 million on its first day, including $5.8 million from Thursday previews. It ended up debuting to $30 million, finishing second behind holdover How to Train Your Dragon and becoming the highest opening weekend of the franchise.

=== Critical response ===
On the review aggregator website Rotten Tomatoes, 88% of 398 critics' reviews are positive, with an average rating of 7.4/10. The website's consensus reads: "28 Years Later taps into contemporary anxieties with the ferocious urgency of someone infected with Rage Virus, delivering a haunting and visceral thrill ride that defies expectations." Metacritic, which uses a weighted average, assigned the film a score of 77 out of 100, based on 56 critics, indicating "generally favorable" reviews. Audiences polled by CinemaScore gave the film an average grade of "B" on an A+ to F scale, while 52% of those surveyed PostTrak said they would definitely recommend it.

Robbie Collin of The Daily Telegraph gave the film 5/5 stars, describing the film as a mix of A Canterbury Tale and Cannibal Holocaust. Ed Potton of The Times also gave it 5/5 stars, calling the film "astonishing". He acknowledged that its "sense of hallucinogenic sweatiness" would not appeal to everyone, but praised Boyle and Garland for taking risks. The Independent's Clarisse Loughrey described 28 Years Later as "a post-Brexit, COVID-19-conscious take on this world", identifying themes of nationalism and isolationism within the film. She gave it 3/5 stars.

Rolling Stone's David Fear questioned whether the film was satisfactory as a whole, but praised the film for "making the most" out of its timely themes. Adam Graham of The Detroit News gave it a D grade, calling it "an uneven mix of horror movie gnarliness and human melancholia that never finds even ground or a consistent tone, and may make viewers reel from genre whiplash." Kyle Smith of The Wall Street Journal gave 28 Years Later a negative review, describing it as "short on wit and narrative coherence."

Robert Daniels, writing for RogerEbert.com, gave the film three-and-a-half out of four stars, stating that "Ever since IP-driven cinema took over, we've long missed the pleasure of being surprised.... [W]hatever you think the third edition in this trilogy could be, Boyle and Garland gleefully subvert it. Instead, '28 Years Later,' an at times tonally daring and whimsically transportive coming-of-age zombie film, does the exact opposite of what you expect.... '28 Years Later' is a deeply earnest film, a picture whose sincerity is initially off putting until it’s endearing." Critic Scout Tafoya, Daniels's colleague in RogerEbert.com, named 28 Years Later as the third best film of 2025, behind Two Pianos (tied with Filmlovers!) and The Ice Tower.

=== Accolades ===
Accolades received by 28 Years Later
Award	Date of ceremony	Category	Recipient(s)	Result	Ref.
Astra Film Awards	9 January 2026	Best Horror or Thriller Feature	28 Years Later	Nominated	
Astra Film Awards	9 January 2026	Best Performance in a Horror or Thriller	Alfie Williams	Nominated	
Astra Midseason Movie Awards	3 July 2025	Best Picture	28 Years Later	Nominated	
Astra Midseason Movie Awards	3 July 2025	Best Director	Danny Boyle	Nominated	
Astra Midseason Movie Awards	3 July 2025	Best Actor	Alfie Williams	Nominated	
Astra Midseason Movie Awards	3 July 2025	Best Supporting Actress	Jodie Comer	Nominated	
British Academy Film Awards	22 February 2026	Outstanding British Film	Danny Boyle, Andrew Macdonald, Peter Rice, Bernard Bellew, and Alex Garland	Nominated	
Chicago Film Critics Association	11 December 2025	Best Editing	Jon Harris	Nominated	
Critics' Choice Movie Awards	4 January 2026	Best Hair and Make-Up	Flora Moody and John Nolan	Nominated	
Digital Spy Reader Awards	28 December 2025	Best British Rising Star	Alfie Williams	Won	
Fangoria Chainsaw Awards	19 October 2025	Best Wide Release	28 Years Later	Nominated	
Fangoria Chainsaw Awards	19 October 2025	Best Director	Danny Boyle	Nominated	
Fangoria Chainsaw Awards	19 October 2025	Best Supporting Performance	Ralph Fiennes	Nominated	
Fangoria Chainsaw Awards	19 October 2025	Best Cinematography	Anthony Dod Mantle	Nominated	
Fangoria Chainsaw Awards	19 October 2025	Best Score	Young Fathers	Nominated	
Fangoria Chainsaw Awards	19 October 2025	Best Makeup FX	John Nolan	Nominated	
Golden Trailer Awards	29 May 2025	Best of Show	Sony, Buddha Jones (for "Days")	Won	
Golden Trailer Awards	29 May 2025	Best Horror	Sony, Buddha Jones (for "Days")	Nominated	
Golden Trailer Awards	29 May 2025	Most Original Trailer	Sony, Buddha Jones (for "Days")	Won	
Golden Trailer Awards	29 May 2025	Best Voice Over	Sony, Buddha Jones (for "Days")	Won	
Golden Trailer Awards	29 May 2025	Best Sound Editing	Sony, Buddha Jones (for "Days")	Nominated	
Golden Trailer Awards	29 May 2025	Best Digital | Horror/Thriller	SOS, Sony, Buddha Jones	Nominated	
London Film Critics' Circle	1 February 2026	Young British/Irish Performer of the Year	Alfie Williams	Won	
San Diego Film Critics Society	15 December 2025	Best Youth Performance	Alfie Williams	Nominated	
Saturn Awards	8 March 2026	Best Horror Film	28 Years Later	Nominated	
Saturn Awards	8 March 2026	Best Film Make Up	Flora Moody and John Nolan	Nominated	
Seattle Film Critics Society	15 December 2025	Best Youth Performance	Alfie Williams	Nominated	
St. Louis Film Critics Association Awards	14 December 2025	Best Horror Film	28 Years Later	Nominated	

== Sequels ==
In April 2024, Nia DaCosta was reportedly in negotiations to direct a sequel to the film, the second part of a planned trilogy, with Boyle, Garland, Macdonald, Rice, and Bernie Bellew attached as producers. In June 2024, via a copyright filing, the title of the film was revealed to be 28 Years Later: The Bone Temple.

On 18 August 2024, during a talk at the Edinburgh International Film Festival, Macdonald confirmed DaCosta would be directing the sequel and said that principal photography was set to begin the following day. Principal photography commenced on 19 August 2024. The film was shot back-to-back with its predecessor and released in the United Kingdom on 13 January 2026 as part of a double bill with 28 Years Later, before being released individually on 14 January, and in the United States on 16 January 2026.

In December 2025, following well-received press screenings of The Bone Temple, Sony officially greenlit a third film in the trilogy. Boyle confirmed he was returning to direct, with Garland writing the screenplay. Cillian Murphy was reported to be in talks to reprise his role from 28 Days Later. In a June 2025 interview with The Hollywood Reporter, Boyle said, "We're still trying to get the money for the third one." In May 2026, Boyle addressed the third film, stating, "We ran out of time. Because it’s set in an area of Britain [where] you can only film at certain times of the year. We ran out of time this year – we literally ran out of time… So it’ll be, hopefully, fingers crossed, next year. But there’s the enthusiasm there, and Alex has done a wonderful script for it."

== See also ==
- List of films produced back-to-back
