= Blue State =

Blue State may refer to:

- Blue state, a state in the United States with a tendency toward electing Democrats
- Blue States (band), an electronica band from London
- Blue State (film), a 2007 romantic comedy film

== See also ==
- Blue State Coffee, coffee stores in Rhode Island, Connecticut, and Massachusetts
- Blue State Digital, a Washington, D.C.–based Internet strategy and technology firm
