= Sunshine (soundtrack) =

Sunshine: Music from the Motion Picture

Soundtrack album by Underworld and John Murphy
- Released: 25 November 2008
- Recorded: 2006
- Genre: Soundtrack
- Length: 55:08
- Label: Fox Music Group

Sunshine: Music from the Motion Picture is the soundtrack album for the 2007 Danny Boyle film Sunshine. It is a joint composition by the electronic band Underworld and film score composer John Murphy. Underworld has a long history of collaboration with Boyle, having been featured on the soundtracks of Boyle's Trainspotting, A Life Less Ordinary, and The Beach. Murphy composed the scores to Boyle's 28 Days Later and Millions.

The Sunshine soundtrack also includes "Avenue of Hope", a song released by I Am Kloot two years before its inclusion in the film, and "Peggy Sussed" by Underworld. These tracks are featured during the film's end credits.

== Release ==
The soundtrack release was held up for over a year with lawyers trying to resolve unspecified legal issues. However, on 10 September 2008, Underworld announced that the soundtrack was to be released in digital format shortly. On 25 November 2008 the soundtrack was finally released exclusively through the iTunes Store. On 14 February 2009 the album was re-released on iTunes in DRM-free iTunes Plus format. A remastered version of "Adagio in D Minor" was released by John Murphy in 2012. Although available for purchase via iTunes, Murphy announced that anyone signing up to his site's newsletter would receive a free Mp3 copy, along with a copy of the remastered "In the House - In a Heartbeat".

== Other appearances ==
Various tracks from the album have been featured in other media. Avenue of Hope appears on an I Am Kloot album, as does Underworld's "To Heal", of which "Capa Meets the Sun" is a variation.

=== "Adagio in D Minor" ===
The tracks "Sunshine (Adagio in D Minor)", and "Kaneda's Death Pt. 2 (Adagio in D Minor)" have been adapted in other media. Variations of the adagio's progression appear in many films, television programs, trailers, and adverts. Notably, John Murphy heavily re-used the adagio as a theme during composition of the Kick-Ass soundtrack, and wrote a series of variations for use in the film. Other examples include:

- A scene in the movie Top Gun: Maverick
- A trailer for the movie Ready Player One
- A trailer for the movie The Big Picture, original title 'L'homme qui voulait vivre sa vie'
- A trailer for the movie Blindness
- A trailer for the movie The Adjustment Bureau
- A trailer for the movie Like Dandelion Dust
- A trailer for the movie X-Men: Days of Future Past
- A trailer for the IMAX documentary Hubble 3D
- A part of the trailer for X-Men Origins: Wolverine
- The unaired pilot episode of the television series Fringe
- The season finale of the 2009 television series V (season 1, episode 12: "Red Sky")
- Episodes of the television series The Walking Dead (season 1, episode 5: "Wildfire"; season 2, episode 1: "What Lies Ahead")
- An NBC feature on speed skater Apolo Ohno that aired on 14 February 2010 during the network's coverage of the 2010 Winter Olympics in Vancouver
- The 2009 film The Lovely Bones
- The advert used in Cineworld Cinemas
- The soundtrack for the movie Kick Ass
- Episode 2 of BBC 2's How to Grow a Planet
- The opening segment on HBO's 24/7 Rangers vs. Flyers series that debuted in December 2011
- A trailer for the movie The Mortal Instruments: City of Bones
- A trailer for the movie Star Trek Into Darkness
- A 2012 advert for Dior perfume J'adore
- A 2013 advert for a Samsung Smart TV
- The BBC documentary Asteroids - The Good the Bad and the Ugly
- A TV spot for the 2013 film Gravity
- A 2013 NASCAR/ESPN advert
- A 2013 Nike Canada advert "All Ice is Home Ice"
- A 2014 advert for the U.S. cable network History
- A trailer for the film Unbroken, released on Christmas Day, 4
- Episodes of Antiques Roadshow Detectives on BBC2 in 2015
- Announcement trailer for the PC game Civilization VI
- Episode 1 of Second Chance
- Promotional video for The Duke of Edinburgh's Award
- Video of Ryan Lockwood getting streets 1:12
- Season 5 Episode 14 of Love Island (2015 TV series)
- Season 3 Episode 17 of FOX's 9-1-1
- Season 1, Episode 1 of FOX’s 9-1-1 Nashville
- Season 1 Episode 9 of ESPN/Netflix docuseries The Last Dance (TV series)
- An aerial scene in 2020's Wonder Woman 1984
- Episode 9 (Finale) of BBC's 2025 SeriesThe Celebrity Traitors

== Track listing ==
No.	Title	Writer(s)	Length
1.	"Welcome to Icarus II" (Includes Capa's monologue introducing the mission)	John Murphy	1:59
2.	"Avenue of Hope" (Used during the closing credits)	I Am Kloot	4:34
3.	"Capa's Last Transmission Home"	Underworld	2:11
4.	"Kaneda's Death, Pt. 2 (Adagio in D Minor)"	John Murphy	2:58
5.	"Mercury"	Underworld & John Murphy	2:10
6.	"Kaneda's Death Pt. 1"	John Murphy	6:06
7.	"Searle Finds the Crew of Icarus I / Floating Free / Searle's Last Blast"	Underworld & John Murphy	3:11
8.	"Freezing Outside: Harvey"	John Murphy & Underworld	2:54
9.	"Trey's Fate"	Underworld	2:42
10.	"Pinbacker Slashes Capa" (Includes Capa's confrontation with Pinbacker)	John Murphy & Underworld	2:32
11.	"Corazon Finds the Seedling"	Underworld	1:20
12.	"Cassie Searches / Dead Corazón"	John Murphy & Underworld	2:41
13.	"Freezing Inside: Mace"	John Murphy	1:51
14.	"Capa Suits Up"	John Murphy	1:54
15.	"Sunshine (Adagio in D Minor)" (Includes Cassie discussing her dreams of the sun)	John Murphy	4:27
16.	"Capa's Jump"	John Murphy	1:20
17.	"Distortions"	Underworld	5:40
18.	"Capa Meets the Sun (To Heal)" (Includes Capa's transmission to Earth)	Underworld	2:18
19.	"Peggy Sussed" (Used during the closing credits)	Underworld	2:27
Total length:			55:08
