= Wonder Woman 1984 =

2020 American superhero film by Patty Jenkins

- Theatrical release poster
- Directed by: Patty Jenkins
- Screenplay by: Patty Jenkins; Geoff Johns; David Callaham
- Story by: Patty Jenkins; Geoff Johns
- Based on: Characters from DC
- Produced by: Charles Roven; Deborah Snyder; Zack Snyder; Patty Jenkins; Gal Gadot; Stephen Jones
- Starring: Gal Gadot; Chris Pine; Kristen Wiig; Pedro Pascal; Robin Wright; Connie Nielsen
- Cinematography: Matthew Jensen
- Edited by: Richard Pearson
- Music by: Hans Zimmer
- Production companies: Warner Bros. Pictures; DC Films; Atlas Entertainment; The Stone Quarry
- Distributed by: Warner Bros. Pictures
- Release date: December 25, 2020 (United States)
- Running time: 151 minutes
- Country: United States
- Language: English
- Budget: $200 million
- Box office: $169.6 million

Wonder Woman 1984 (also stylized as WW84) is a 2020 American superhero film based on the DC character Wonder Woman. Produced by Warner Bros. Pictures, Atlas Entertainment, and The Stone Quarry, and distributed by Warner Bros., it is the sequel to Wonder Woman (2017) and the ninth film in the DC Extended Universe (DCEU). The film was directed by Patty Jenkins from a screenplay she co-wrote with Geoff Johns and David Callaham, based on a story by Jenkins and Johns. It stars Gal Gadot as Diana Prince / Wonder Woman, alongside Chris Pine, Kristen Wiig, Pedro Pascal, Robin Wright, and Connie Nielsen. Set in 1984 during the Cold War, the film follows Diana and her past love Steve Trevor as they face off against Maxwell Lord and Cheetah.

Discussion of a sequel began shortly after the release of the first film in June 2017 and the decision to proceed was confirmed the following month. Principal photography began on June 13, 2018, with filming taking place at Warner Bros. Studios, Leavesden in England, as well as the District of Columbia and Northern Virginia in the U.S., London and Duxford in England, Tenerife and Fuerteventura in the Canary Islands and Almería. Production wrapped on December 22, 2018, after a six-month shoot, with additional filming in July 2019.

Following multiple delays due to the COVID-19 pandemic, Wonder Woman 1984 eventually premiered on December 15, 2020, via the DC FanDome virtual platform, and was released in the United States by Warner Bros. Pictures on December 25, 2020. The film received mixed reviews from critics and grossed $169 million worldwide, failing to break even against its $200 million budget. Its underperformance at the box office was attributed to factors such as most theaters being closed during the pandemic and the film's simultaneous release on HBO Max, where it became the top streaming film of 2020. Plans for a third film were canceled after DC Films was restructured into DC Studios in 2022. A new series, Paradise Lost (set in the DCU), focusing on the Amazons of Themyscira, is in development.

== Plot ==
As a child, Diana participates in an athletic competition on Themyscira against adult Amazons. After being knocked off her horse, she takes a shortcut and remounts, but misses a checkpoint. Antiope removes her from the race for cheating, explaining that anything worthwhile must be obtained honestly, while her mother Hippolyta advises her to be patient in her pursuit of glory and honor.

In 1984, over sixty years after her battle with Ares during World War I, (Note: As depicted in Wonder Woman (2017)) Diana is working at the Smithsonian Institution in Washington, D.C., while secretly performing heroic deeds as Wonder Woman. New museum employee Barbara Minerva, a shy geologist and cryptozoologist, has trouble getting noticed by her co-workers, but quickly finds a friend in Diana.

The FBI asks the museum to identify stolen antiquities from a robbery that Wonder Woman recently foiled; Barbara and Diana notice a Latin inscription on one artifact (the Dreamstone) that claims to grant its holder one wish. Neither one openly takes the inscription seriously, but after Diana saves Barbara from an assailant by secretly using her powers, Barbara wishes she were strong, sexy, and cool "like" Diana and thus unintentionally acquires the same superpowers. Because Diana yearns for Steve Trevor, her lover who died heroically, he is resurrected in another man's body, and they are reunited.

Failing businessman Maxwell "Max Lord" Lorenzano recognizes the Dreamstone and hopes to use its power to save his nearly bankrupt oil company. His wish is to "become" the stone and gain its powers: whenever he grants someone else's desire, he can take what he wants from the wisher. This soon results in worldwide chaos, destruction, and instability. Diana discovers that the Dreamstone was created by Dolos/Mendacius, God of Lies, also known as the Duke of Deception. It grants a user's wish, but exacts an equally strong toll unless they renounce the wish or destroy the stone. Although Diana's powers and Barbara's humanity begin to diminish, neither is willing to renounce her wish. Max visits the U.S. president, who wishes for more nuclear missiles as protection against the Soviets, but these are detected, bringing the world to the brink of nuclear war. Max also learns of a new and secret satellite system that can broadcast to everyone in the world simultaneously. Since his powers are causing his body to deteriorate, he plans to grant wishes globally to steal strength and life force from the viewers and regain his health. Diana and Steve confront him, but Barbara sides with Max, overpowering Diana and escaping with him on Marine One.

Steve convinces Diana to renounce her wish and let him go, restoring her to full strength. Donning the armor of Asteria, the greatest of all Amazon warriors, Diana confronts Barbara, who has been transformed into a humanoid cheetah after Lord grants her wish to be an "apex predator". After a brutal fight that ends in a lake, Diana overcomes Barbara with an electric shock, then pulls her out of the water. Diana confronts Max and uses her Lasso of Truth to communicate with the world through him, persuading everyone to renounce their wish. She then shows him visions of his unhappy childhood and of his son, Alistair, who is frantically searching for his father amid the chaos. Realizing the error of his ways, Max renounces his wish and reunites with Alistair, simultaneously renouncing everyone else's wishes and turning Barbara back to normal. In the present day, it is winter, and Diana meets the man whose body Steve possessed.

In one mid-credits scene, Asteria is revealed to still be alive, living among humans, and also secretly heroic.

== Cast ==
- Gal Gadot as Diana Prince / Wonder Woman:
  An immortal demigoddess, Amazon princess and warrior. The daughter of Hippolyta, the Amazonian queen of Themyscira, and Zeus, the king of the Olympian Gods. Gadot spoke about the character's evolution, saying in the first film "[Diana] really is a fish out of water, coming from Themyscira into man's world and learning about the complexities of human life, really. In Wonder Woman 1984, she's been around. She's wiser and she's more mature. She's guarded and lost all of her friends throughout the years, but she's still doing the right thing, yet she is different from when we last saw her." Gadot added, "In the first movie, we really explored the journey of the coming-of-age, of how Diana Prince became Wonder Woman and owned her full strengths and powers."
  - Lilly Aspell as a young Diana.
- Chris Pine as Steve Trevor: An WWI pilot and spy and Diana's lover who died in the first film. His soul possesses another man in which only Diana sees him as Trevor.
- Kristen Wiig as Barbara Minerva / Cheetah: A highly insecure geologist and gemologist who is befriended by Diana. She gradually transforms throughout the film by use of the Dreamstone.
- Pedro Pascal as Maxwell "Max Lord" Lorenzano:
  A struggling yet charismatic businessman, famous for TV infomercials and the founder of Black Gold Cooperative. Lord's character, according to Director Patty Jenkins, is modeled on Bernie Madoff and Donald Trump. Jenkins has stated Pascal's performance as Lord was inspired by Gordon Gekko from Oliver Stone's Wall Street and by Gene Hackman's portrayal of Lex Luthor in Richard Donner's 1978 Superman film, with Jenkins describing Lord as "a villain with potential to be dangerous and scary".
- Robin Wright as Antiope: Hippolyta's sister, general of the Amazon army and Diana's aunt.
- Connie Nielsen as Hippolyta: The queen of Themyscira and Diana's mother.

Also appearing in the film are: Amr Waked as Emir Said Bin Abydos, the ruler of the fictional oil-rich Middle Eastern nation of Bialya who Lord encounters; Kristoffer Polaha as the man whose body Steve Trevor appropriates, credited as "Handsome Man"; Natasha Rothwell as Carol, Barbara's boss at the Smithsonian; Ravi Patel as Babajide, a man who provides Diana and Barbara documents of the Dreamstone's history; Oliver Cotton as Simon Stagg, a dissatisfied investor in Lord's company; Lucian Perez as Alistair, Lord's son; Gabriella Wilde as Raquel, Lord's assistant; Kelvin Yu as Jake, Diana and Barbara's co-worker; and Stuart Milligan as the president of the United States, based on Ronald Reagan, with Lewis Schaffer playing his delegate in an uncredited cameo role. Doutzen Kroes reprises her DCEU role as the Amazon Venelia.

Lynda Carter, who portrayed Wonder Woman in the 1970s series, makes a cameo appearance in the mid-credits scene as Asteria, a legendary Amazon warrior who wore the powerful winged suit of armor. Gadot's husband Yaron Varsano and their two daughters, Alma and Maya, make brief appearances near the end of the film. Saïd Taghmaoui, Ewen Bremner, Eugene Brave Rock, and Lucy Davis make a photographic cameo appearance, reprising their roles from Wonder Woman as Sameer, Charlie, Chief, and Etta Candy respectively.

== Production ==
=== Development ===
The director of the first film, Patty Jenkins, who initially signed for only one film, had expressed interest in returning to direct the sequel. In June 2017, during an interview with Variety, comic book writer Geoff Johns revealed that he and Jenkins had started writing the treatment for a Wonder Woman sequel and that he had a "cool idea for the second one". While speaking in a Q&A at a Women in Film screening of the film, Jenkins stated she would indeed direct the sequel. Jenkins later clarified that "it wasn't a confirmation. Just talking about ideas and hopes."

On July 22, 2017, at San Diego Comic-Con, the studio officially announced a sequel would be produced, with Jenkins returning as director; its title was listed as Wonder Woman 2. In September 2017, it was officially confirmed that Jenkins would be directing the sequel. On September 13, 2017, it was reported that The Expendables writer David Callaham would join the film to co-write the script with Jenkins and Johns, who had already been working on it for several months.

On February 28, 2018, it was reported that the film would be shot with IMAX film cameras in select action sequences. By late May 2018, long-time DCEU producer Zack Snyder confirmed on social media platform Vero that he, along with his wife Deborah Snyder, would serve as producers on the Wonder Woman sequel. On June 13, 2018, the title of the film was announced to be Wonder Woman 1984. A source close to Jenkins described it as a stand-alone film "in the same way that Indiana Jones or [James] Bond films are, instead of one continuous story that requires many installments."

=== Pre-production ===
Pre-production officially began by early December 2017 in the United Kingdom. That same month, director Patty Jenkins stated that the film would be another great love story. In April 2018, the film was confirmed to be set in the 1980s. In May, production designer Aline Bonetto (Amélie, Wonder Woman) was announced to be returning for the sequel, as well as Lindy Hemming, also returning as costume designer.

=== Casting ===
In September 2017, Gal Gadot was confirmed to return as the title character. On February 28, 2018, it was reported that Kristen Wiig was in talks with the studio to play Cheetah, the main villain of the film, with director Patty Jenkins confirming her casting the next month. By March 28, Pedro Pascal, who played Ed Indelicato in the pilot of the canceled 2011 Wonder Woman television adaptation, was cast in an undisclosed key role, later revealed to be Maxwell Lord. On June 13, Jenkins confirmed the return of Chris Pine as Steve Trevor via Twitter. On July 24, 2018, Natasha Rothwell was announced to be cast in an undisclosed role. A few days later, on July 27, Ravi Patel and Gabriella Wilde also joined the film, with their roles being kept under wraps as well. By late August, Connie Nielsen and Robin Wright were confirmed to reprise their roles as Hippolyta and Antiope in a flashback sequence. In November 2018, Kristoffer Polaha revealed that he has a role in the film.

=== Filming ===
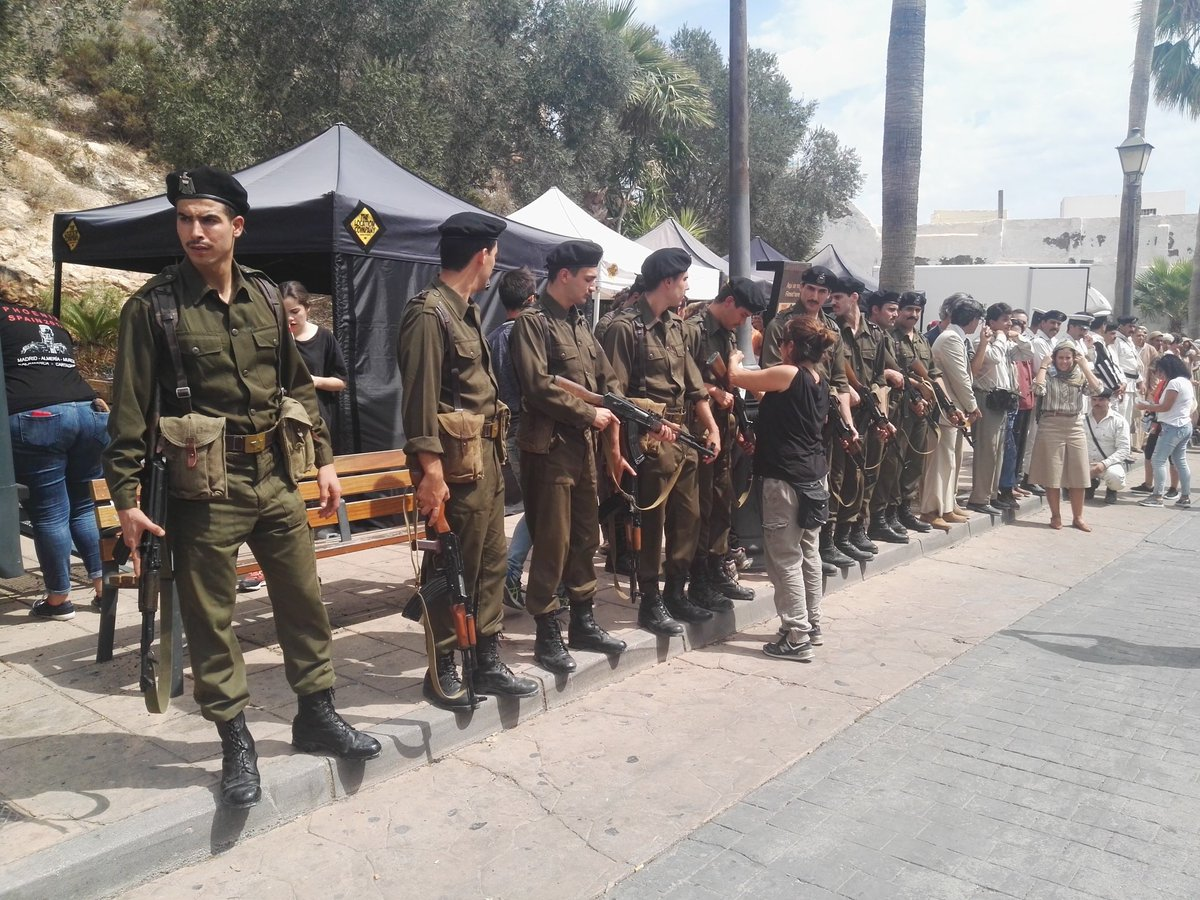
Filming of Wonder Woman 1984 in front of the Alcazaba of Almería in Almería, Spain

Principal photography ran from June 13, 2018, until December 22, 2018.

Under the working title Magic Hour, it started at locations around the District of Columbia and Northern Virginia in the United States. Locations included the Landmark Mall in Alexandria, Virginia, and Georgetown. Scenes were shot in Alexandria from June 18 through July 14. Filming occurred outside the U.S. Capitol in Washington, D.C., in mid-June. Other filming locations around D.C. included the Penn Quarter neighborhood, McPherson Square, the DAR Constitution Hall near the White House, the Hirshhorn Museum and Sculpture Garden (Smithsonian), and the Lincoln Memorial. By July, production in the United States was completed.

In August, filming moved to England. Locations included Warner Bros. Studios, Leavesden and several places around London, including St. Andrew's Place, Regent's Park and the Royal College of Physicians. In September and October 2018, production took place at Almería, in Andalusia, southern Spain, and Fuerteventura and Tenerife in the Canary Islands. From September 5 to 11, filming occurred at the Alcazaba of Almería fortified complex and the Wall of Jayran in Almería. Production moved to Fuerteventura for September 13 to 26, at the Corralejo Dunes National Park, Parque Holandés, El Jablito, La Oliva and the Jandía Natural Park. Filming in Tenerife began during the last week of September, lasting two weeks at various locations on the island.

Production returned to England in October, with shooting at the Imperial War Museum in Duxford, Hyde Park, the Savoy Hotel in Central London, and Torrington Square, next to Birkbeck, University of London. By mid-November 2018, Pedro Pascal finished filming his scenes. Principal photography finished on December 22, 2018, after a six-month shoot. Additional photography and reshoots began on July 28, 2019, in London at Warner Bros. Studios, and was completed the following month.

It was the first film to sign up to the Producers Guild of America guidelines for dealing with incidents of sexual harassment on set.

=== Post-production ===
Richard Pearson served as the editor for Wonder Woman 1984. John Moffatt (Harry Potter and Life) served as the overall visual effects supervisor for the film. Double Negative (DNEG), Framestore and Method Studios provided the visual effects for the film. Alexis Wajsbrot served as the visual effects supervisor for Framestore. In December 2019, Jenkins revealed work on the film was completed five months in advance of the original release date.

=== Music ===
In August 2018, Hans Zimmer was announced as the composer for Wonder Woman 1984, replacing Rupert Gregson-Williams who scored the first film. Zimmer previously scored Man of Steel and Batman v Superman: Dawn of Justice, the first and second films in the DC Extended Universe and the latter which also featured Wonder Woman. The first track from the score, "Themyscira", was released as part of DC FanDome 2020. Another track, "Open Road", was released on December 10, 2020, as part of the "Week of Wonder" social media promotion leading up to the film's release.

The album was released on December 16, 2020, by WaterTower Music.

Other music featured in the film according to the closing credits include "Welcome to the Pleasuredome" by Frankie Goes to Hollywood, "Voi Che Sapete" by Wolfgang Amadeus Mozart, "Adagio in D Minor" by John Murphy, "M.E." by Gary Numan, "Rio" by Duran Duran and "I Won't Leave You" by Clinton Shorter from the 2014 film Pompeii.

The first official theatrical trailer, cut to renditions of Blue Monday by New Order and Sebastian Böhm, was well-received, but that song does not feature in the movie.

== Marketing ==
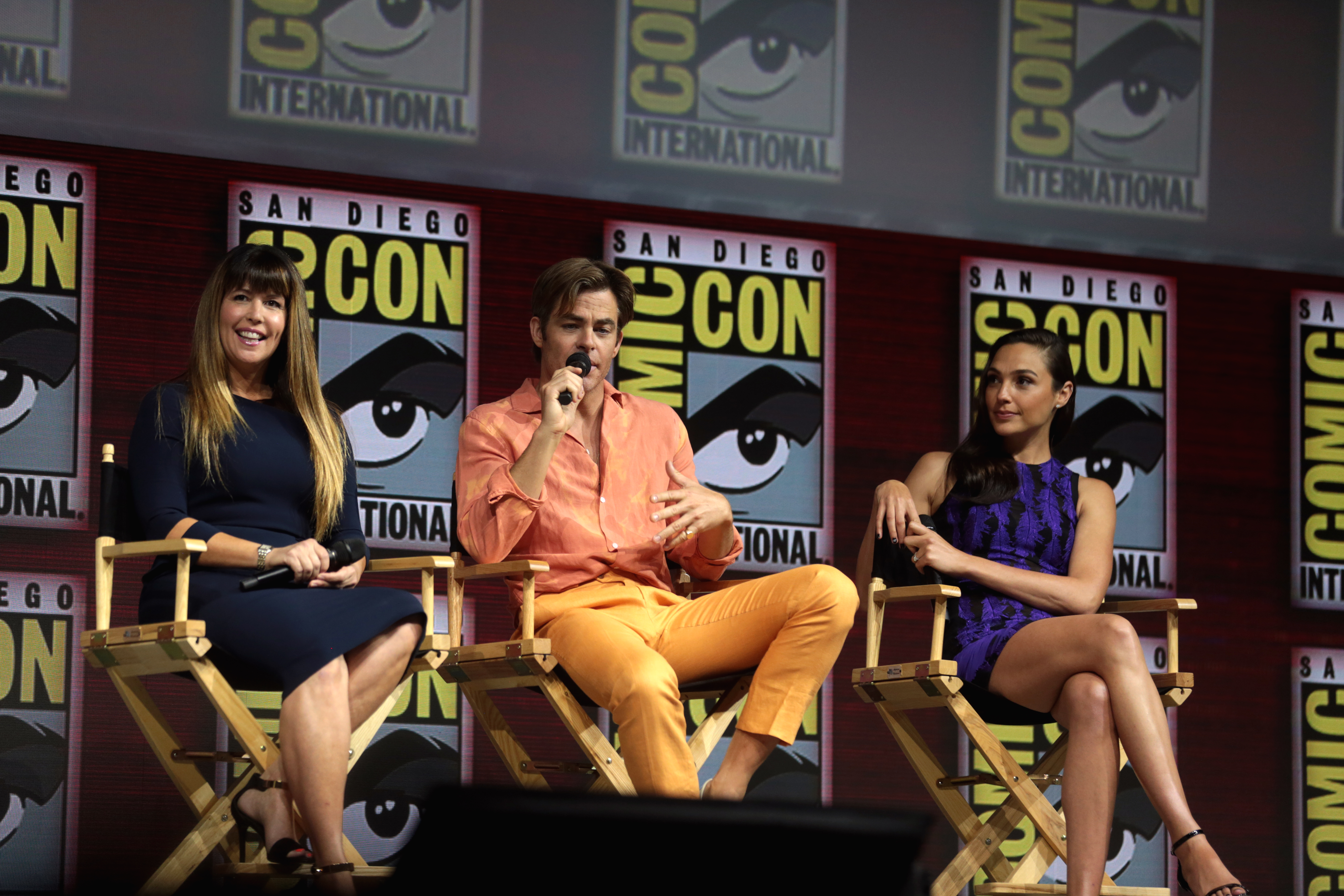
Patty Jenkins, Chris Pine and Gal Gadot promoting Wonder Woman 1984 at the 2018 San Diego Comic-Con

On June 22, 2018, it was reported that Gal Gadot would be attending the Warner Bros. DC presentation at the 2018 San Diego Comic-Con (SDCC) and some footage from the film would be shown to promote it. Director Patty Jenkins and actors Gadot and Pine attended the Wonder Woman 1984 panel at SDCC on July 21, 2018, where a short clip of the film was shown. New footage was shown during CinemaCon 2019 in Las Vegas, Nevada, with a first look at Kristen Wiig in the film. In June 2019, Warner Bros. screened an extended look to European exhibitors at CineEurope in Barcelona, Spain.

A teaser poster debuted on June 5, 2019, one year ahead of the film's then-scheduled release date. In October 2019, it was announced that the film's first trailer would debut during Comic Con Experience CCXP 2019 on December 8, with Gadot and Jenkins attending the event in São Paulo, Brazil. By the end of the month, WarnerMedia Entertainment debuted new footage from the film during the HBO Max presentation to the press. The first trailer debuted on December 8 at the 2019 Comic Con Experience (CCXP), with the show being livestreamed on Twitter around the world in real time. It used Sebastian Böhm's instrumental remix of "Blue Monday" by New Order. The same day, character posters for Wonder Woman, Maxwell Lord, Barbara Ann Minerva, and Steve Trevor were released. In August 2020, the film's second trailer was released during DC FanDome.

The second trailer was "re-released" in November 2020 once the film's simultaneous theatrical and streaming debut was confirmed. Later that month, a new international poster was released, along with confirmation the film would have a presence at Brazil's Comic Con event CCXP 2020 on December 6. A one-minute final trailer was released during the convention.

Wonder Woman 1984 premiered on December 15, 2020, in a fan-first event, via the DC FanDome virtual platform. The "Virtual World Premiere" included the participation of director Jenkins, stars Gadot, Pine, Wiig, and Pascal and a performance from the film's composer Zimmer. The opening scene of the film was released during the event.

The week prior to its domestic launch, the studio spent $17 million on television ads promoting the film.

== Release ==
=== Theatrical and streaming ===
Wonder Woman 1984 was theatrically released by Warner Bros. Pictures in a handful of international markets starting on December 16, 2020, and was theatrically released in the United States and Canada on December 25 in RealD 3D, Dolby Cinema and IMAX while streaming on HBO Max in the United States and via premium video-on-demand in Canada the same day. IMAX theaters showed a version of the film with a taller aspect ratio during select scenes. That version was also seen on HBO Max as well. The film was released theatrically in additional markets through January 28, 2021.

It was originally announced for release on December 13, 2019, before being moved up to November 1, 2019, then it was delayed to June 5, 2020. On March 24, 2020, with theatres closed for an uncertain period of time due to the COVID-19 pandemic, the film was delayed to August 14, 2020, taking the release date of Malignant. In June 2020, another delay saw the film's release pushed to October 2, 2020, before it was delayed further to the Christmas date in September, following the tepid opening weekend of Warner Bros' Tenet in the United States and in response to the continued closure of theaters in Los Angeles, San Francisco and New York City at the time.

Later, Variety reported the film would be keeping its Christmas release date in theaters, while the film would also premiere digitally on HBO Max in the United States the same day, with the film being available at no extra cost to subscribers, after a staggered theatrical release schedule in most international markets that do not have HBO Max starting on December 16, including Greece, South Africa and the United Kingdom. Shortly after, Deadline Hollywood reported that in order to get exhibitors on board with the day-and-date HBO Max release, Warner Bros. agreed to take a lower cut of the rental revenue than it usually does with a tentpole release, as well as to pull the film from HBO Max after a month so that the second month of the film's run would be exclusive to theaters. The site also said industry analysts had estimated the film's break-even point at $500 million and that it was expected to lose money for the studio. Adam Aron, CEO of US theater chain AMC Theatres, supported the simultaneous release strategy, stating, "Given that atypical circumstances call for atypical economic relationships between studios and theaters and atypical windows and releasing strategies, AMC is fully onboard for Warner Brothers' announcement."

The film's simultaneous release strategy led to Warner Bros. announcing on December 3, 2020, that its entire slate of 2021 films would be given the same release strategy. This led to many filmmakers, production companies and theater chains (who were not informed and consulted with over the move) to voice their disappointment and displeasure over the move, especially in regards to the special treatment given to the cast and filmmakers of Wonder Woman 1984 that was not given to the other filmmakers and actors with their 2021 films. Despite being paid her bonus by Warner Bros. as a result of the move, Patty Jenkins herself expressed both worry and optimism over the move's impact on the future of theaters and moviegoing.

In the United Kingdom and Ireland, the film was released on premium video-on-demand services as a 48-hour rental for January 13, 2021 due to the lockdown and closure of theaters in response to COVID-19 surges. While in the Philippines, it was released on HBO Go on April 21, 2021, for the same reason.

The film was re-added to HBO Max following its premiere on HBO's linear channel on May 13, 2021.

=== Home media ===
Wonder Woman 1984 was released as a rental on premium video-on-demand services in the United States on February 12, 2021, on Digital HD on March 16, 2021, followed by its physical release on DVD, Blu-ray and Ultra HD Blu-ray by Warner Bros. Home Entertainment on March 30. The sequences shot for IMAX presentation were retained on all home media releases. As of January 2022, Wonder Woman 1984 has sold more than 606,000 DVDs along with an estimated 818,000 Blu-ray Discs totaling $16.1 million and $22.9 million, respectively, for a total of $39.1 million in sales revenue.

== Reception ==
=== Audience viewership ===
Following its opening weekend, Warner Bros. announced that HBO Max saw total viewing hours on the film's first day more than triple in comparison to a typical day in the previous month. Several days later, Screen Engine reported that 23% of viewers had subscribed to HBO Max in order to watch the film. The company also said that Wonder Woman 1984 was already the most-watched straight-to-streaming title of the year, beating Hamilton. According to Nielsen, the film totaled 2.25 billion minutes spent by HBO Max users over its first three days of release, "equivalent to about 14.9 million complete plays of the 151-minute movie".

Samba TV later reported that the film was watched in 3.2 million households within its first week of release and 3.9 million in the first 17 days and in over 4.3 million U.S. households by the end of its month. Following its third weekend of release, Deadline Hollywood wrote "if there's anything positive to report, we'll hear about on the next AT&T earnings call" but if viewership numbers were noteworthy "we would have already heard about it." In January 2022, tech firm Akami reported that Wonder Woman 1984 was the eighth most pirated film of 2021.

=== Box office ===
Wonder Woman 1984 grossed $46.8 million in the United States and Canada and $122.8 million in other territories, for a worldwide total of $169.6 million. In January 2021, The Hollywood Reporter wrote that the film would likely lose the studio "north of $100 million."

In the United States and Canada, the film was released alongside News of the World, Promising Young Woman and Pinocchio and was projected to gross around $10 million from 2,151 theaters in its opening weekend. It ended up debuting to $16.7 million, finishing above expectations and with the best total of the COVID-19 pandemic, but 87% less than the first film's opening weekend. Over 10,000 private screenings of the film were held, accounting for about $2 million (12%) of the opening weekend total. It fell 68% in its second weekend, grossing $5.4 million. In its third weekend the film fell another 46% to $3 million, with Deadline Hollywood saying it "continued to emulate the legs of a horror movie". The film grossed $2.2 million in its fourth weekend, finishing second behind newcomer The Marksman.

Internationally, the film was expected to debut to around $60 million from 32 countries. Global projections were subsequently lowered to $35–40 million and the film went on to debut to $38.2 million, including $5 million from IMAX screens. China was the largest opening with $18.7 million, followed by Taiwan ($3.5 million), Thailand ($2 million), Brazil ($1.7 million), Japan ($1.1 million), Mexico ($1.4 million), the United Kingdom ($1.2 million) and Spain ($1.1 million). In its second weekend of international release, the film made $19.4 million from 40 countries. Its largest markets were Australia ($4.5 million) and Japan ($2.5 million), while China's running total reached $23.9 million.

=== Critical response ===
Slate called Wonder Woman 1984's critical response "lukewarm", and Newsweek described it as "mixed". The Washington Post reported that the response changed from "early praise to precipitous decline". According to Variety, critics praised the film's "escapist qualities" and Jenkins's take on the 1980s, but many commentators found it "overindulgent or clichéd".

On Rotten Tomatoes, 57% of 456 reviews are positive, with an average rating of 6.1/10. The website's critical consensus reads, "Wonder Woman 1984 struggles with sequel overload, but still offers enough vibrant escapism to satisfy fans of the franchise and its classic central character." Upon the initial drop of the review embargo, the film achieved a 90% positive review score; this score gradually dropped until it ended up at 59% after the release. Metacritic, which uses a weighted average, assigned the film a score of 60 out of 100, based on 57 critics, indicating "mixed or average" reviews. Audiences polled by CinemaScore gave the film an average grade of "B+" on an A+ to F scale (lower than the "A" received by its predecessor), and PostTrak reported 78% of those gave the film a positive score, with 67% saying they would definitely recommend it.

Kate Erbland of IndieWire gave the film a "B" and wrote "Wonder Woman 1984 is all about playing with magic and wishes and desires, only to see them lead to horrible ramifications, instant gratification and the revelation that lying is never without consequence. Those are some big swings and not every single one lands, but the ones that do are both joyous and genuinely worth pondering." Jake Coyle of The Associated Press considered the film "both campier and more real than Marvel movies — more like the page-turning thrill of a comic book", writing that the film has "ambitions...just outside its grasp, but it seldom feels predestined or predictable — a preciously rare commodity in the genre." Nicholas Barber of BBC gave the film four stars out of five, likening it favorably to a 1980s blockbuster and considering the plot to have a "sweet fairy-tale aspect." Richard Roeper of the Chicago Sun-Times gave the film three-and-a-half out of four stars, saying, "To be sure, we get a classic comic book movie storyline about a megalomaniacal madman intent on taking over the world, but there's often a relatively light tone to the proceedings. This is a throwback piece of pure pop entertainment."

Alonso Duralde of TheWrap wrote: "Even if the notion of wishes — making them and then takesies-backsies — isn't quite a cinematic enough concept to support Wonder Woman's final face-off with Lord, Wonder Woman 1984 still brings a freshness and a wit that's often lacking in these gargantuan costumed-hero sagas." Writing for The Guardian, Peter Bradshaw gave the film 3 out of 5 stars and stated, "Gadot is terrifically imposing, while Kristen Wiig is the scene-stealing antagonist in Patty Jenkins' epically brash sequel."

Manohla Dargis of The New York Times wrote that "Patty Jenkins is behind the camera again, but this time without the confidence. Certainly some of the problems can be pinned on the uninterestingly janky script, a mess of goofy jokes, storytelling clichés and dubious politics." Adam Graham of The Detroit News gave the film a "C" and wrote that "the result is far from wondrous, a reminder of the limitations of the superhero genre and the ways its escapist trappings sacrifice key storytelling elements (narrative, characters, dialogue) for empty spectacle." Mick LaSalle of the San Francisco Chronicle praised Gadot, writing "Her performance here has dignity and earned emotion" and calling her the best thing about the film, adding, "She was the best thing in the first installment, too, but that was an excellent movie. This one isn't." He concluded, "Often, it's a beautiful-looking film — but it's beauty without substance." In her review for RogerEbert.com, Christy Lemire wrote "The quality that made the original film such a delight has been squashed almost entirely."

=== Controversy ===
A plot point in which Steve inhabits the body of another man, credited as "Handsome Man", was criticized as Steve puts this body into dangerous situations and uses it without consent, including a scene in which it is implied that sex may have occurred between Diana and Steve. Criticism was aimed at the film's lack of acknowledgment of what happened to the man while Steve was inhabiting his body, as well as Diana and Steve not appearing to consider the issue of consent, even if Steve coming back but in another man's body was not any of the characters' intention.

The Mary Sue described the event as a rape and strongly condemned it. Jenkins replied in agreement to a fan's tweet that tries to explain there were no issues with this plot aspect, that the film was following the trope of a body swap, similar to Big or Freaky Friday. Bonnie Burton, writing for CNET, stated that while this may have been Jenkins's intention, the body swap trope may not be as politically correct in the current period as it was in the 1980s.

=== Accolades ===
Award	Ceremony Date	Category	Recipient(s)	Result	Ref.
Hollywood Music in Media Awards	January 27, 2021	Best Original Score in a Sci-Fi/ Fantasy Film	Hans Zimmer	Nominated	
Hollywood Critics Association Awards	March 5, 2021	Best Blockbuster	Wonder Woman 1984	Nominated	
Hollywood Critics Association Awards	March 5, 2021	Best Stunts	Wonder Woman 1984	Nominated	
Critics' Choice Movie Awards	March 7, 2021	Best Visual Effects	Wonder Woman 1984	Nominated	
Nickelodeon Kids' Choice Awards	March 13, 2021	Favorite Movie	Wonder Woman 1984	Won	
Nickelodeon Kids' Choice Awards	March 13, 2021	Favorite Movie Actor	Chris Pine	Nominated	
Nickelodeon Kids' Choice Awards	March 13, 2021	Favorite Movie Actress	Gal Gadot	Nominated	
Set Decorators Society of America Awards	March 31, 2021	Best Achievement in Décor/Design of a Science Fiction or Fantasy Feature Film	Anna Lynch-Robinson and Aline Bonetto	Nominated	
Make-Up Artists & Hair Stylists Guild Awards	April 3, 2021	Best Special Make-Up Effects in a Feature-Length Motion Picture	Jan Sewell & Mark Coulier	Nominated	
Screen Actors Guild Awards	April 4, 2021	Outstanding Performance by a Stunt Ensemble in a Motion Picture	Wonder Woman 1984	Won	
Art Directors Guild Awards	April 10, 2021	Excellence in Production Design for a Fantasy Film	Aline Bonetto	Nominated	
Costume Designers Guild Awards	April 13, 2021	Excellence in Sci-Fi/Fantasy Film	Lindy Hemming	Nominated	
Motion Picture Sound Editors Awards	April 16, 2021	Outstanding Achievement in Sound Editing – Sound Effects & Foley for Feature Film	Jimmy Boyle, Richard King, Michael Babcock, Jeff Sawyer, Rowan Watson, Lily Blazewicz, Kevin Penney, Peter Burgess, Zoe Freed	Nominated	
Motion Picture Sound Editors Awards	April 16, 2021	Outstanding Achievement in Sound Editing – Feature Underscore	Gerard McCann, Ryan Rubin, Michael Connell, Timeri Duplat, Chris Barrett, Adam Miller, Alfredo Pasquel	Nominated	
Golden Raspberry Awards	April 24, 2021	Worst Remake, Rip-off or Sequel	Wonder Woman 1984	Nominated	
Golden Raspberry Awards	April 24, 2021	Worst Supporting Actress	Kristen Wiig	Nominated	
MTV Movie & TV Awards	May 16, 2021	Best Hero	Gal Gadot	Nominated	
Imagen Foundation Awards	October 10, 2021	Best Actor - Feature Film	Pedro Pascal	Nominated	

== Future ==
=== Cancelled sequel ===
In January 2019, after principal photography on Wonder Woman 1984 was completed, director and co-writer Patty Jenkins announced that she had mapped out the plot for a third Wonder Woman film set in the present day. In December 2019, she said the third movie would take longer to produce than the second. In April 2020, Jenkins said she had a story arc for four Wonder Woman films, including an Amazons film and then a third Wonder Woman film. In June 2020, Jenkins said that she had stopped working on the story so she could see how to absorb the result of the COVID-19 pandemic into the story. In December 2020, Jenkins said that she and Geoff Johns had "beat out an entire story" for a third film, but she had doubts about whether to make it with the world's current state, whether it will be her next film, and whether her feelings about it will change. Gal Gadot expressed that she wanted the third film to take place in the present, saying "the past has been handled well and now it's time to move on".

The sequel was officially greenlit on December 27, 2020, with Jenkins and Gadot officially returning and Warner Bros. confirming that the film would have a traditional theatrical release as compared to Wonder Woman 1984. In December 2022, The Hollywood Reporter reported that a third Wonder Woman film from Jenkins was not moving forward because it "did not fit in" with the plans for the DCEU put forth by new DC Studios heads James Gunn and Peter Safran. The film and other DC Studios projects in development were put into doubt as a result of the change in leadership, which Gunn claimed resulted in a transition period that created "drawbacks" and resulted in production on new films being delayed. Jenkins later stated that the film would not proceed under the new plans for DCEU being developed by Gunn and Safran. On January 31, 2023, Gunn and Safran stated that they had spoken to Gadot about possibly continuing playing the character of Wonder Woman in the new DC Universe films. Despite the sequel being shelved at that time, Gadot still continued as Wonder Woman into 2023; She made two uncredited cameo appearances in both Shazam! Fury of the Gods and The Flash. Gadot had already been attached to cameo in these projects and had filmed her parts for both films during each production in 2021.

In June 2023, Gadot stated that "things were being worked behind the scenes" in regards to her continuing to play Wonder Woman, and in August 2023 claimed that she would be developing a third Wonder Woman film with Gunn and Safran; however, later media reports claimed that this was not the case. Any chances of a third film were effectively quelled in October 2023, when Variety reported that none of the DCEU actors cast for Zack Snyder's films would reprise their roles in the DCU, including Gadot as Wonder Woman. This was again confirmed in 2025, when a new Wonder Woman film set in the DCU was confirmed to be in production. A script was being written by top writers, but it was reported that Gadot will not reprise her previous DCEU role. In August 2026, Gadot herself confirmed, though she still held out hope for the character, she was not contacted about reprising her role in the DCU.
