= Shooters (2001 film) =

2001 film by Dan Reed

- Directed by: Dan Reed
- Written by: Dan Reed
- Produced by: Dan Reed; Ceri Barnes
- Starring: Paul Attah; Ali Awad; Desmond Bayliss
- Cinematography: Jacek Petrycki
- Edited by: Stefan Ronowicz
- Music by: Daniel L. Griffiths; John Murphy
- Distributed by: 101 Films
- Release date: 17 November 2001 (International Filmfestival Mannheim-Heidelberg)
- Running time: 72 minutes
- Country: United Kingdom
- Language: English

Shooters is a 2001 crime film directed by Dan Reed for Suspect Device Films. It stars Desmond Bayliss as "Dezzie", and is set in Liverpool and used local criminals as actors depicting the lives of local 'gangsters. It is most notable for having been completely unscripted apart from a brief outline; each scene was improvised and ad-libbed by the actors themselves.

Shooters was first broadcast in December 2000 on Channel 4 as part of its Cutting Edge series. The Liverpool-born musician John Murphy co-wrote the score.

The Plot follows local liverpool gangsters, most notably “big john” and “dezzy” as they navigate the local drug trade.

Family, financial and social aspects are all portrayed.

Dialogue from the film was sampled in the intro of the 50 Cent album Curtis.

== Cast ==
- Paul Attah as Paul
- Ali Awad as Dezzys Friend
- Desmond Bayliss as Dezzy
- Franny Bennett as Franny
- Stephen Condon as Stephen
- Shakira Jones as Shakira
- Ricky Rowe as Ricky
- Christopher Scully as Scully
- Cheryl Varley as Big John's Ex
- John Wayland as John
