= Megan Burns =

English actress and singer

- Also known as: Betty Curse
- Born: June 25, 1986 (age 40); Liverpool, England
- Genres: Pop rock
- Occupations: Singer; actress
- Years active: Actress: 2000–2018; Singer: 2006–2007
- Label: Island

Megan Burns, also known as Betty Curse, is an English former actress and musician.

== Career ==
=== Acting ===
Megan Burns was cast as Teresa in the film Liam (2000), winning the Marcello Mastroianni Award at the Venice Film Festival for her performance. Director Danny Boyle, after seeing her performance, cast her in his film 28 Days Later (2002), where she played Hannah, one of the survivors of a deadly epidemic.

Megan was cast in Intruders (2018), a short film directed by Naeem Mahmood.

=== Singing ===
Burns became a singer with a band. One source refers to Betty Curse as a stage name for Burns, while another refers to the whole band by this name. In 2006, Betty Curse appeared on and won a Halloween special of the children's television program The Slammer with "Girl with Yellow Hair". Their first and only album, Hear Lies, was released on Universal on 30 October 2006.

== Filmography ==
Film
Year	Title	Role	Notes
2000	Liam	Teresa	Won—Marcello Mastroianni Award
2002	28 Days Later	Hannah	
2018	In2ruders	Whistler Silkwood	Short film

== Discography ==
=== Albums ===
- 2006 Hear Lies

=== Singles ===
- 2006 "Excuse All the Blood"
- 2006 "God This Hurts" UK No. 116
- 2006 "Girl with Yellow Hair" UK No. 132
- 2007 "Do You Mind (If I Cry)"
