= DC FanDome =

Multi-genre entertainment and comic convention

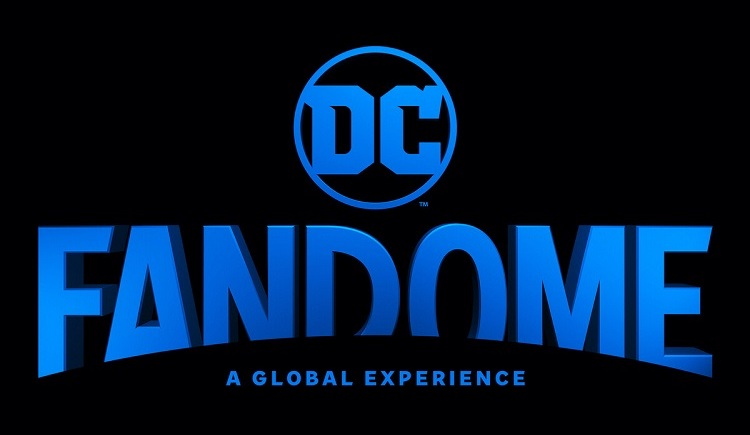
- Official logo
- Genre: Superhero fiction
- Venue: Online
- Location: Global
- Inaugurated: August 22, 2020; 6 years ago
- Most recent: October 16, 2021; 5 years ago
- Attendance: 22 million (Aug. 2020); 66 million (Oct. 2021)
- Organizer: Warner Bros. Entertainment; DC Comics

DC FanDome was a virtual event platform created by DC Comics and Warner Bros. Entertainment. Created initially as a virtual entertainment and comic book convention, the name is used for other online events centered on DC properties. The events feature announcements about DC-based content, including the DC Extended Universe film franchise, the Arrowverse television franchise, other films and television shows, comic books, as well as video games.

The first convention was held in June 2020 as Warner Bros. and DC's response to San Diego Comic-Con's cancellation due to the COVID-19 pandemic. Warner Bros. also used the "DC FanDome" portal for the virtual premiere of Wonder Woman 1984 in December, while a second convention was held in October 2021. FanDome was not held in 2022 following the return of in-person events and conventions.

== 2020 convention ==
=== Development ===
Development for a DC Comics-centric fan event was first conceived in April 2020 when the COVID-19 pandemic forced the cancellation of E3 2020 and the eventual cancellation of San Diego Comic-Con 2020. On June 14, 2020, with Comic-Con replaced by a virtual Comic-Con@Home, Warner Bros. announced a separate DC-themed online-only convention. Dubbed as DC FanDome, the free "immersive virtual fan experience" was a 24-hour-long event held on August 22, 2020. The hosts and many of the panelists were sent production kits from DC to capture their full bodies on green screens so they could appear in the virtual Hall of Heroes stage designed by DC chief creative officer Jim Lee. Some of the larger panels that need to happen over video conference used unique backgrounds. The content for the event was shot over a two-week period at the end of July 2020, and was completed by August 15, 2020.

On August 19, 2020, FanDome was announced to be split over two different days. The main presentation, entitled "DC FanDome: Hall of Heroes", was held as scheduled on August 22. The remaining programming was provided through a one-day video on demand experience, "DC FanDome: Explore the Multiverse", on September 12. Lisa Gregorian, Warner Bros. TV group president and chief marketing officer, and Blair Rich, president of worldwide marketing for Warner Bros. Pictures Group, revealed the decision to split the event into two dates came after hearing fan feedback from the initial schedule announcement saying there was too much content to consume in 24 hours.

Fans and global audiences were able to log in freely without any usage of badge tags or financial purchasing much like the Comic-Con convention, and see new announcements and trailers for a variety of upcoming DC films, TV series, comics, and video games, including details on the Arrowverse television franchise. Virtual panels featured interviews from the cast and creators of many current and upcoming DC projects such as The Batman, Black Adam, The Suicide Squad, Zack Snyder's Justice League, Wonder Woman 1984, Shazam! Fury of the Gods, The Flash, and other major film projects set in the DC Extended Universe franchise. The event was broadcast in English, Spanish, Traditional Chinese, Japanese, Korean, Portuguese, French, German, and Italian. DC Comics plans to produce another iteration of a virtual event in the future, with Gregorian adding it could coexist with physical, in person events such as Comic-Con.

=== Hosts and participants ===
In August 2020, DC Comics released a large list of hosts and participants including Matt Reeves, director of The Batman (2022); its star Robert Pattinson; directors Zack Snyder, Patty Jenkins and James Gunn; and others from the DC Extended Universe franchise. Thirteen global hosts from 14 countries were also used.

=== Attendance and engagement ===
DC FanDome: Hall of Heroes was viewed by 22 million people in 220 countries over its 24-hour live stream. "DC FanDome" also trended on Twitter and YouTube in 53 and 82 countries, respectively. Gregorian spoke to this, saying, "We reached a lot of fans around the world that we wouldn't normally be able to reach. We were able to have questions from India answered, or artwork looked at from the Philippines or South Africa, by the talent."

== Wonder Woman 1984 premiere ==
In December 2020, it was announced that DC FanDome would return for the virtual premiere of Wonder Woman 1984, occurring in the Hall of Heroes on December 15, 2020. The premiere featured behind-the-scenes featurettes of the film, a virtual red carpet hosted by Tiffany Smith, where director Patty Jenkins and stars Gal Gadot, Chris Pine, Kristen Wiig, and Pedro Pascal answered fan questions, a musical performance by composer Hans Zimmer was released, and a sneak peek at the film.

== 2021 convention ==
In April 2021, it was announced that a second DC FanDome convention would be held on October 16, 2021. The 2021 event was available on the FanDome website, as well as on Twitch, YouTube, Facebook, and Twitter, with a dedicated kid-friendly experience also available separately. The event featured announcements and sneak peeks at upcoming films, television series, video games, comic book titles, and properties from Warner Bros. Animation. Among the announcements include trailers for The Batman and Peacemaker, teasers for Black Adam and The Flash, and first looks at Suicide Squad: Kill the Justice League and Gotham Knights. Blake Neely composed the score for the event, after previously doing so for several Arrowverse television series; two versions of his theme song were released as singles two days prior to the event. The event livestream was viewed by 66 million people worldwide, tripling that of the previous year. Similar to the 2020 convention, "DC FanDome" trended on Twitter in 53 countries.

== Discontinuation ==
In September 2022, DC announced that it would not hold FanDome again in 2022, as the return of in-person events and conventions allowed Warner Bros. Discovery a means to engage with fans and promote their content.

== See also ==
- D23 Expo
- Disney+ Day
- Tudum
