= 28 Days Later (soundtrack) =

28 Days Later: The Soundtrack Album

Soundtrack album by John Murphy, Various Artists
- Released: June 17, 2003
- Recorded: 2002
- Genres: Rock, post-rock, alternative rock, ambient, electronica, classical
- Length: 45:03

John Murphy chronology
City by the Sea (2002)	28 Days Later: The Soundtrack Album (2003)	The Perfect Score (2004)

28 Days Later: The Soundtrack Album is the accompanying soundtrack album and original score composed by John Murphy, for the 2002 film of the same name. It was released in CD format on the 17 June 2003 additionally including tracks from Brian Eno, Grandaddy and Blue States, which also featured in the film.

The second movement of "East Hastings" by the Canadian post-rock band Godspeed You! Black Emperor, albeit condensed, appeared in the film but not on the soundtrack album because the rights for the song could not be obtained.

== Track listing ==
All tracks performed by John Murphy unless otherwise stated.

No.	Title	Length
1.	"The Beginning"	2:56
2.	"Rage"	1:22
3.	"The Church"	1:16
4.	"Jim's Parents (Abide with Me)" (Abide with Me performed by Perri Alleyne)	2:29
5.	"Then There Were Two"	0:42
6.	"Tower Block"	1:26
7.	"Taxi (Ave Maria)" (Ave Maria performed by Perri Alleyne)	2:08
8.	"The Tunnel"	1:39
9.	"A.M. 180" (performed by Grandaddy)	3:20
10.	"An Ending (Ascent)" (performed by Brian Eno)	4:17
11.	"No More Films"	0:48
12.	"Jim's Dream"	0:40
13.	"In Paradisum (Faure's Requiem in D Minor)"	2:11
14.	"Frank's Death – Soldiers (Requiem in D Minor)"	2:39
15.	"I Promised Them Women"	1:24
16.	"The Search for Jim"	2:41
17.	"Red Dresses"	0:48
18.	"In the House - In a Heartbeat"	4:16
19.	"The End"	1:55
20.	"Season Song" (performed by Blue States)	4:12
21.	"End Credits"	1:46
22.	"Season Song (Rui da Silva Remix)" (performed by Blue States)	7:39
23.	"Taxi (Ave Maria) (Jacknife Lee Remix)"	6:15

Tracks 22 and 23 appear on the U.S. release only.

== Reception and single releases ==
Professional ratings
Review scores
Source	Rating
AllMusic	3/5 stars
Sputnikmusic	3.5/5 stars

"Season Song", a song performed by British band Blue States, from their 2002 album Man Mountain, was released as a single, containing a remixed version by Rui da Silva and a "Taxi" (Ave Maria) remix by Jacknife Lee.
