= Liam (2000 film) =

2000 film by Stephen Frears

- Directed by: Stephen Frears
- Written by: Jimmy McGovern
- Produced by: Colin McKeown; Martin Tempia
- Starring: Ian Hart; Claire Hackett; Anne Reid; Anthony Borrows; Megan Burns
- Cinematography: Andrew Dunn
- Edited by: Kristina Hetherington
- Music by: John Murphy
- Production companies: BBC Films; Arte
- Distributed by: Lions Gate Films (United States); Artificial Eye (United Kingdom); BIM Distribuzione (Italy); Diaphana Films (France)
- Release dates: 4 September 2000 (Venice Film Festival); 23 January 2001 (UK)
- Running time: 91 minutes
- Countries: United States; United Kingdom; Germany; Italy; France
- Box office: $1.9 million

Liam is a 2000 film directed by Stephen Frears and written by novelist/screenwriter Jimmy McGovern. McGovern adapted Joseph Mckeown's novel Back Crack Boy for this emotionally raw meditation on innocence and pain. Frears in turn was influenced by James Joyce's accounts of his stern childhood in late 19th century Catholic Dublin.

== Plot ==
A family falls into poverty during the Depression.

Set in Liverpool in the Great Depression of the 1930s, the story is told through the eyes of a boy, Liam Sullivan. Liam is taking instruction in preparation for his First Communion. His mother is a staunch Roman Catholic. His father loses his job when his shipyard closes. Meanwhile, his sister, Teresa, has become a maid for the Jewish family who own the shipyard.

Liam stutters badly under stress, and his strict religious education does not help. Teresa's mistress is having an affair, and the girl becomes an accomplice. Liam's father joins a group of fascists, who rail against rich Jews and cheap Irish labour. His brother secretly attends meetings with socialists. All of this is a microcosm of a more general breakdown of society.

Life becomes increasingly insecure and people retreat into their own belief systems. This leads to increasing conflict, leading inexorably to a single violent act.

== Cast ==
- Anthony Borrows as Liam
- Ian Hart as Dad
- Claire Hackett as Mum
- Anne Reid as Mrs. Abernathy
- Megan Burns as Teresa

== Box office ==
The film grossed $91,000 in the United Kingdom. It grossed $1 million in the United States and Canada and $1.9 million worldwide.

== Reception ==
On the review aggregator website Rotten Tomatoes, 70% of 76 critics' reviews are positive, with an average rating of 6.4/10. The website's consensus reads: "Though Liam's harrowing story is reminiscent of Angela's Ashes, it showcases strong performances, including one by child actor Anthony Burrows." Metacritic, which uses a weighted average, assigned the film a score of 74 out of 100, based on 25 critics, indicating "generally favorable" reviews.

Critics compared the film to the similarly themed Angela's Ashes, but Roger Ebert said Liam "is harder-edged, more unsparing". He singled out the performances of Borrows and Hart. Some found the ending to be unnecessarily harsh; Ebert wrote, "I think it follows from a certain logic, and leads to the very last shot, which is heartbreaking in its tenderness." A.O. Scott of The New York Times, however, critiqued the film's use of melodrama.

In his review for The Guardian Peter Bradshaw applauded the powerful performances but criticized its clichéd scenes. According to him, the movie explores sin, shame, and fascism, but lacks epiphanies and meaningful redemption, leaving the audience battered and dispirited.

At 57th Venice International Film Festival, Meghan Burns was awarded Marcello Mastroianni Award.
