= Blue State Coffee =

American coffee store chain

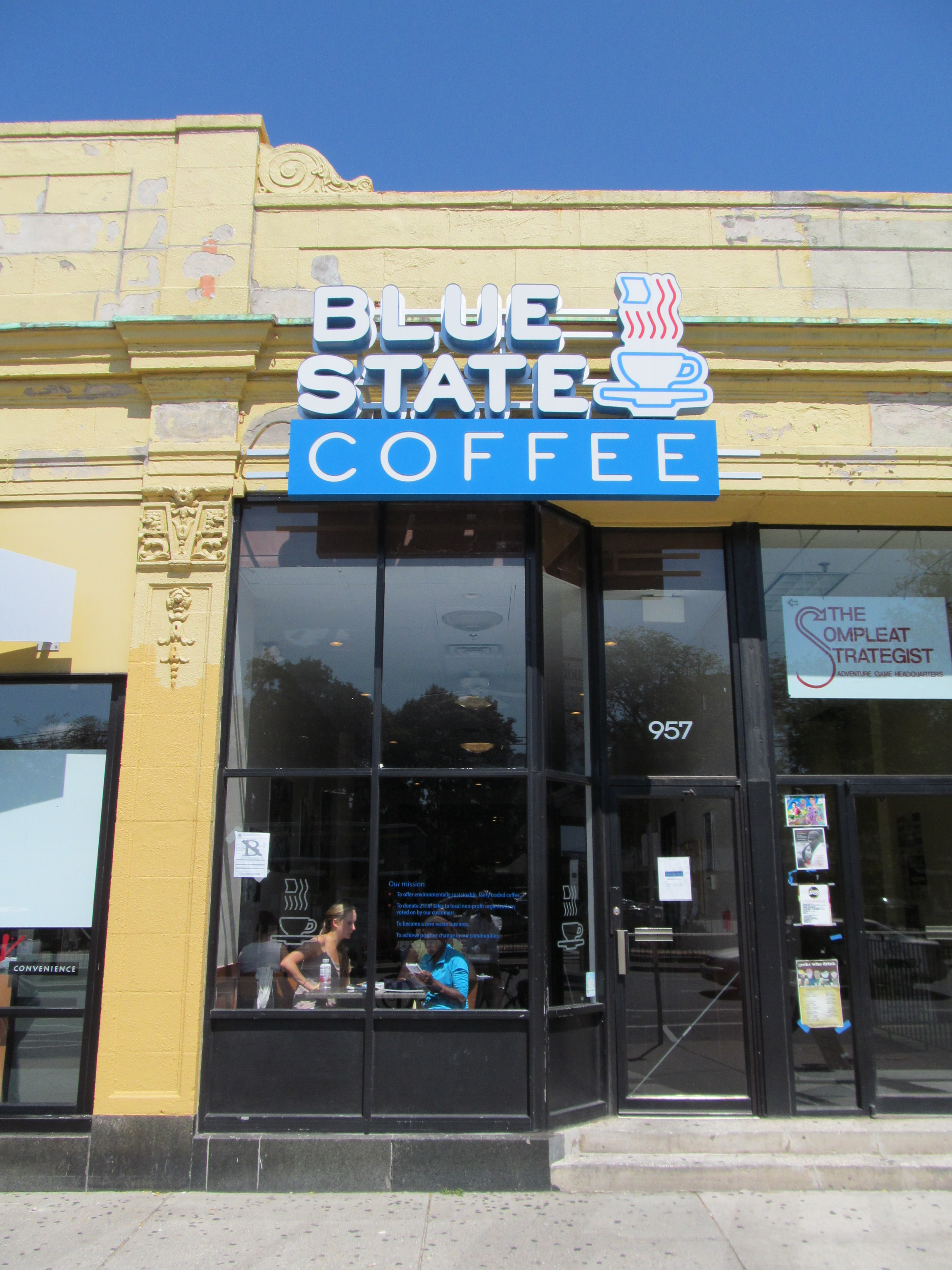
- Blue State Coffee in Boston, Massachusetts.

Restaurant information
- Established: July 2007; 18 years ago
- Closed: 2022
- Food type: Coffee Shop
- Dress code: Casual
- Location: United States
- Reservations: No
- Website: BlueStateCoffee.com

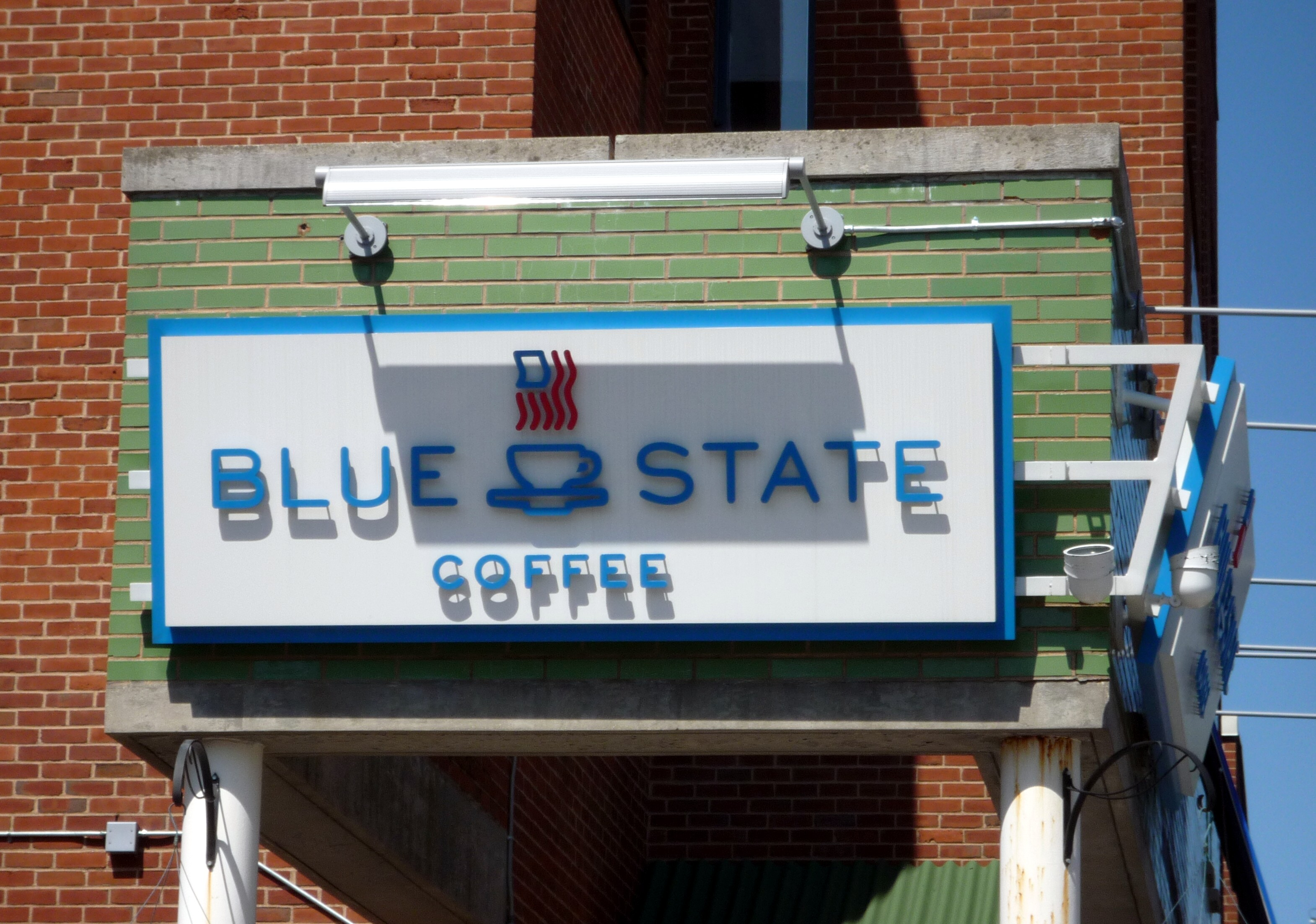
Providence location

Blue State Coffee was a company that ran a group of coffee stores in Providence, Rhode Island, New Haven, Connecticut, and Hartford, Connecticut, selling their own small-batch coffees.

== History ==
The company launched a website in September 2006. It is run by CEO Carolyn Greenspan. The first store opened in July 2007 on Thayer Street in Providence, on edge of Brown University's campus.

In February 2009, Blue State Coffee opened two more stores: one in the Brown University Bookstore and another in New Haven, near Yale University

Throughout the 2010s, it opened additional stores in New Haven, Boston, and Hartford, eventually running a total of nine. By 2020, it had downsized slightly, having closed its two Boston stores and the Brown Bookstore location. In the fall of 2022, it closed all of its remaining locations and sold off its remaining stock of coffee and other merchandise.

== Political involvement ==
Blue State cafes have hosted speakers and events for a variety of causes. Notable speakers have included Al Franken (while running for senate in Minnesota), Kal Penn (while campaigning for Barack Obama), and Craig Robinson (Michelle Obama's brother).

== Philanthropy ==
Blue State Coffee has donated over $1,000,000 to non-profit organizations in Providence, New Haven, Hartford, and Boston.

== See also ==
- List of coffeehouse chains
