= John Murphy (composer) =

British film composer (born 1965)

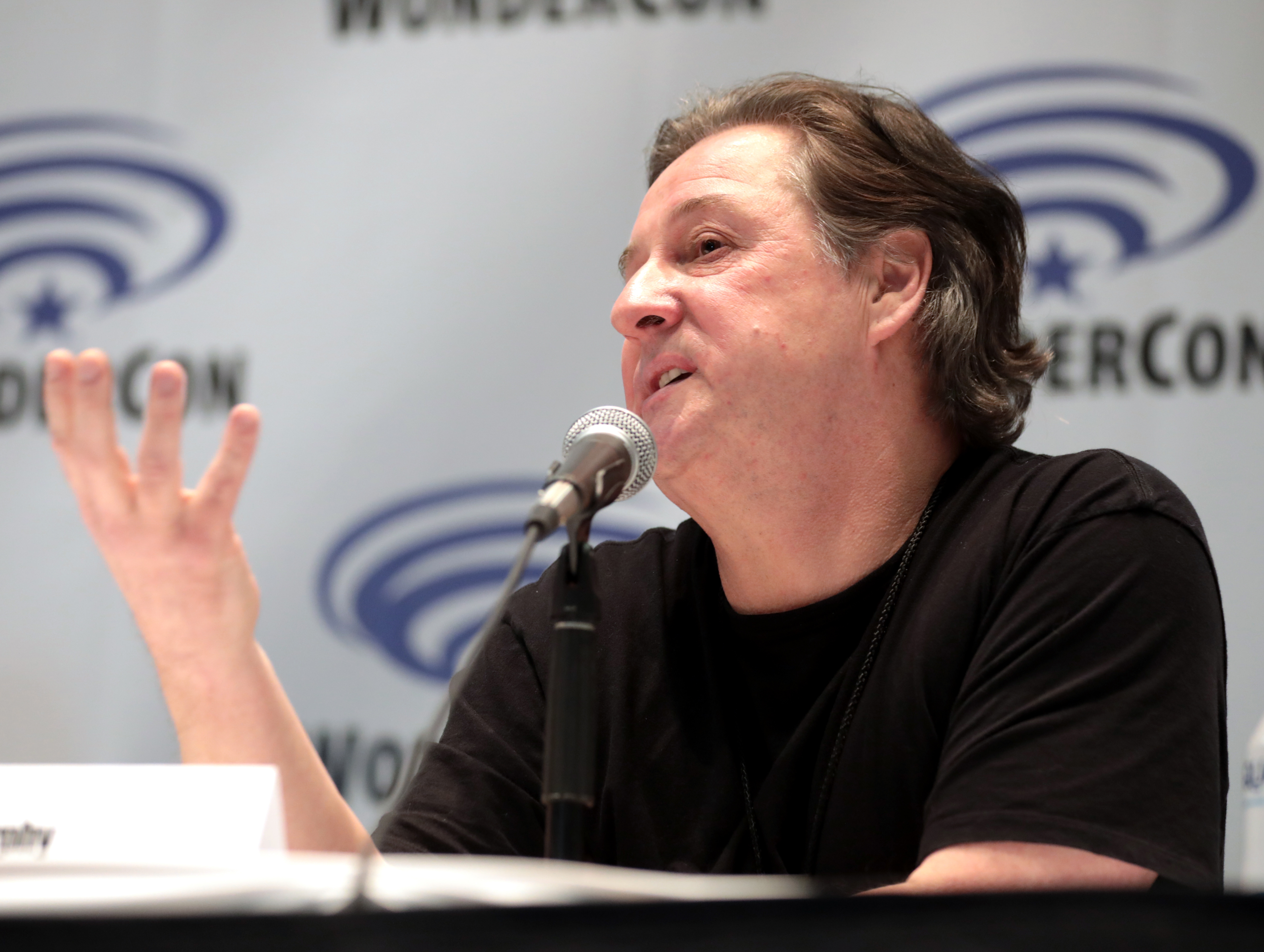
- Murphy at the 2022 WonderCon

Background information
- Born: 4 March 1965 (age 61); Liverpool, England
- Genres: Film score; electronic; electronic rock; hard rock; alternative rock; post-rock
- Occupations: Film composer; musician; music producer
- Instruments: Guitar; bass guitar; piano; keyboards; synthesizer; drums
- Years active: 1980–present
- Label: Taped Noise
- Website: johnmurphyofficial.com

John Murphy (born 4 March 1965) is an English film composer. He is a self-taught multi-instrumental musician who began his career in the 1980s, working with fellow Liverpool-natives The Lotus Eaters and Thomas Lang, as well as Claudia Brücken. His early film score career saw him work with David Hughes from the electronic group OMD, and he has collaborated with directors Danny Boyle, Guy Ritchie, Michael Mann, Matthew Vaughn, Michael Caton-Jones, Stephen Frears, and James Gunn.

Murphy gained recognition in the film industry while working with Guy Ritchie on his film Lock, Stock and Two Smoking Barrels, Michael Mann's Miami Vice, Matthew Vaughn's Kick-Ass and scoring various films by Danny Boyle. His instrumental tracks "In the House - In a Heartbeat" from 28 Days Later and "Adagio in D Minor" from Sunshine, both films by Boyle, have been featured in a variety of TV shows, commercials and film trailers. In 2018, he scored Les Misérables for the BBC, and in 2020, he composed the score for James Gunn's The Suicide Squad, beginning a collaboration that continued in 2023 with Guardians of the Galaxy Vol. 3 and in 2025 with Superman, which he composed with David Fleming.

== Biography ==
Born on 4 March 1965 in Liverpool, England, Murphy's interest in music was sparked when he heard The Beatles rendition of "Twist and Shout", which was the first song he learnt on the guitar. Coming across a book in London, titled, How to be a Film Score Composer, he began composing music for films in the early 1990s and scored his first hit with Leon the Pig Farmer. Together with David Hughes, formerly of the Merseyside-based electronic group OMD, he worked on several successful films, enjoying particular success with the soundtrack to Guy Ritchie's 1998's Lock, Stock and Two Smoking Barrels.

Since Guy Ritchie's Snatch (2000), Murphy has worked independently and has been based in Los Angeles. His successes include Danny Boyle's post-apocalyptic horror 28 Days Later and its sequel 28 Weeks Later. He also collaborated with Underworld to score Boyle's science fiction film Sunshine. In 2006, Murphy composed the score for Michael Mann's Miami Vice. He composed the music for the 2009 remake of the 1972 film The Last House on the Left, followed by 2010's Kick-Ass, based on the comic book of the same name. Other excerpts from his scores have been used for advertising, film trailers, television shows and video games, in particular "In the House - In a Heartbeat" from 28 Days Later, and "Adagio in D Minor" from Sunshine; the former has featured in a number of tense situations on TV shows, such as the BBC's Top Gear, Dragon's Den, The Apprentice and MasterChef.

In 2014, he released an album titled Anonymous Rejected Filmscore that had been, as the title suggests, composed for a film whose studio head had rejected for being too 'weird'. Murphy promised the director that he wouldn't name the film. The score was allowed to develop in directions unconstrained by the original film's narrative and the cover art is a photograph of Murphy's son, taken by his wife through her sunglasses.

In 2018, he scored Les Misérables for the BBC, and in 2020, he composed the score for James Gunn's The Suicide Squad, beginning a collaboration that continued in 2023 with Guardians of the Galaxy Vol. 3. In 2024, he and David Fleming scored Gunn's Superman (2025), the first film of the DC Universe, for which they also incorporated nods to John Williams' "Superman March" from Richard Donner's 1978 film into the score.

== Discography ==
=== Film ===
Year	Title	Director	Notes
1992	Leon the Pig Farmer	Vadim Jean; Gary Sinyor	Composed with David Hughes
1994	Beyond Bedlam	Vadim Jean	
1994	A Feast at Midnight	Justin Hardy	Composed with David Hughes
1994	Dinner in Purgatory	Kerry Kieman	
1995	Clockwork Mice	Vadim Jean	Composed with David Hughes
1995	Proteus	Bob Keen	
1996	Darklands	Julian Richards	
1997	Behind the Mask	Ngozi Onwurah	Short film
1997	The Man Who Made Husbands Jealous	Robert Knights	Television film
1997	Stiff Upper Lips	Gary Sinyor	
1998	What Rats Won't Do	Alastair Reid	
1998	The Real Howard Spitz	Vadim Jean	
1998	Lock, Stock and Two Smoking Barrels	Guy Ritchie	Composed with David Hughes
1999	One More Kiss	Vadim Jean	Composed with David Hughes
1999	The Bachelor	Gary Sinyor	Composed with David Hughes
2000	Snatch	Guy Ritchie	
2000	Liam	Stephen Frears	
2000	Chain of Fools	Pontus Löwenhielm; Patrick von Krusenstjerna	
2001	Hang Time	Ngozi Onwurah	Short film
2001	Vacuuming Completely Nude in Paradise	Danny Boyle	Television film
2001	Strumpet	Danny Boyle	Television film
2001	Shooters	Dan Reed	
2001	Mean Machine	Barry Skolnick	
2002	All About the Benjamins	Kevin Bray	
2002	New Best Friend	Zoe Clarke-Williams	Composed with David Hughes
2002	City by the Sea	Michael Caton-Jones	
2002	28 Days Later	Danny Boyle	
2002	Friday After Next	Marcus Raboy	
2003	Intermission	John Crowley	
2004	The Perfect Score	Brian Robbins	
2004	Millions	Danny Boyle	
2005	Guess Who	Kevin Rodney Sullivan	
2005	Keeping Up with the Jonesers	Craig Borders	Short film
2005	The Man	Les Mayfield	
2006	Basic Instinct 2	Michael Caton-Jones	Themes by Jerry Goldsmith
2006	Miami Vice	Michael Mann	Additional music by Klaus Badelt, Mark Batson and Tim Motzer
2007	Sunshine	Danny Boyle	Composed with Underworld
2007	28 Weeks Later	Juan Carlos Fresnadillo	
2009	The Last House on the Left	Dennis Iliadis	
2009	Janky Promoters	Marcus Raboy	
2009	Armored	Nimród Antal	
2010	Kick-Ass	Matthew Vaughn	Composed with Henry Jackman, Marius de Vries and Ilan Eshkeri
2021	The Suicide Squad	James Gunn	Replaced Tyler Bates
2023	Guardians of the Galaxy Vol. 3	James Gunn	
2025	Superman	James Gunn	Composed with David Fleming; Includes "Superman March" composed by John Williams

=== Documentaries ===
Year	Title	Director	Notes
1996	Where the Bad Girls Go	Chris Bernard	Documentary short
1996	Eunice the Gladiator	Chris Bernard	Documentary short
2000	The Valley	Dan Reed	
2013	Love Never Fails/Forever Found	Kelsey Shaw McNeal	

=== Television ===
Year	Title	Notes
1997	Modern Times	Episode: "The Bubble"
2011	Dispatches	Episode: "The Battle for Haiti"
2011	Frontline	Episode: "Battle for Haiti"
2018	Les Misérables	Miniseries
2022	Peacemaker	TV series
2022	The Guardians of the Galaxy Holiday Special	Special

=== Charting discography ===
Title	Year	Peak chart positions		Album
Title	Year	CZ Rock	FRA	Album
"In the House - In a Heartbeat"	2012	—	89	28 Days Later: The Soundtrack Album
"Pumped Up Kicks" (featuring Ralph Saenz)	2022	1	—	Peacemaker (Soundtrack from the HBO Max Original Series)
"—" denotes a recording that did not chart or was not released in that territory.
