= 28 Days Later =

2002 film by Danny Boyle

- Theatrical release poster
- Directed by: Danny Boyle
- Written by: Alex Garland
- Produced by: Andrew Macdonald
- Starring: Cillian Murphy; Naomie Harris; Christopher Eccleston; Megan Burns; Brendan Gleeson
- Cinematography: Anthony Dod Mantle
- Edited by: Chris Gill
- Music by: John Murphy
- Production companies: DNA Films; Film Council
- Distributed by: Fox Searchlight Pictures (Note: Sony Pictures acquired the film rights in 2024.)
- Release date: 1 November 2002 (UK)
- Running time: 113 minutes
- Country: United Kingdom
- Language: English
- Budget: $8 million
- Box office: $82.8 million

28 Days Later (sometimes stylized with an ellipsis as 28 Days Later...) is a 2002 British post-apocalyptic horror film directed by Danny Boyle and written by Alex Garland. It stars Cillian Murphy as a bicycle courier who awakens from a coma to discover that the accidental release of a highly contagious, aggression-inducing virus has caused the breakdown of society. Naomie Harris, Christopher Eccleston, Megan Burns, and Brendan Gleeson appear in supporting roles.

Garland took inspiration from George A. Romero's Night of the Living Dead film series and John Wyndham's 1951 novel The Day of the Triffids. Filming took place in various locations in the United Kingdom in 2001. The crew filmed for brief periods during early mornings and temporarily closed streets in London to capture recognizable and typically busy areas when they were deserted. John Murphy composed an original soundtrack for the film, with other instrumental songs by Brian Eno, Godspeed You! Black Emperor, and other artists.

28 Days Later was released on 1 November 2002 in the United Kingdom by Fox Searchlight Pictures. It received generally positive reviews and was a commercial success. Grossing $82.8 million worldwide on a budget of $8 million, it became one of the most profitable horror films of 2002. Reviewers praised Boyle's direction, the cast's performances, Garland's screenplay, the atmosphere and soundtrack.

Despite Boyle not considering it a zombie film, 28 Days Later is credited with reinvigorating the genre and influencing a revival in it a decade after its release, with its fast-running infected and character-driven drama. It has been featured in several "best-of" film lists. The film's success launched its titular film series, featuring three further instalments: 28 Weeks Later (2007), 28 Years Later (2025), and 28 Years Later: The Bone Temple (2026). A wider franchise also includes the graphic novel 28 Days Later: The Aftermath (2007), and the comic book series 28 Days Later (2009–2011).

== Plot ==
A group of animal rights activists infiltrate a laboratory in Cambridge which houses abnormally aggressive chimpanzees. Despite a scientist warning that the chimpanzees are "infected" with "rage", an activist frees one; it attacks her and, within seconds of exposure, she succumbs to the virus. She immediately attacks the others, and the virus spreads rapidly across Great Britain, resulting in total societal collapse.

Twenty-eight days later, bicycle courier Jim, who had a traffic accident and fell into a coma before the outbreak, wakes in St Thomas' Hospital in London to find it deserted. Leaving the hospital, Jim wanders the empty streets of London, discovers newspapers headlining a mass evacuation, and eventually enters a church and witnesses the aftermath of a massacre, presumably caused by the infected people. An infected priest and members of the public appear and chase after Jim, but he is rescued by survivors Selena and Mark, who take him to their refuge in a Tube station shop.

At Jim's request, the group travels on foot to his parents' house in Deptford, where he learns that they have died by suicide, leaving a note instructing him to "never wake up". When dusk settles in, the group decides to stay the night. Staying up, Jim reminisces over family memories and lights a candle, drawing the infected neighbours to the house. Mark is infected while eliminating them, forcing Selena to kill him. Jim and Selena make their way up Balfron Tower after seeing a makeshift signal lamp in a flat belonging to cab driver Frank and his young daughter Hannah. Frank plays them a military radio broadcast offering protection and "salvation from infection" at a blockade outside Manchester. Frank plans to take Hannah to the blockade, and the four agree to travel together. Reaching Manchester, they find the blockade deserted. Frank, frustrated, kicks a gate on which a dead infected body is balanced. A drop of blood from the corpse falls into Frank's eye, infecting him. As he warns the others to keep their distance, hidden soldiers appear and shoot him dead as he turns.

The soldiers bring Jim, Selena and Hannah to a heavily fortified country house under the command of Major Henry West, treat their guests to a tour and banquet and introduces him to "Private Mailer", an infected soldier kept chained up for observation. However, the sanctuary turns out to be a ruse; West reveals to Jim that his broadcast was intended to lure female survivors into sexual slavery to maintain his troops' morale, giving them faith in a future where the human race survives. Jim and Sergeant Farrell refuse to go along with this scheme, so West orders them to be imprisoned. While chained, Farrell tells Jim that the infection has not spread across the Atlantic and that Britain has been quarantined from the rest of the world. Two soldiers shoot Farrell and then argue, allowing Jim to escape into the woods. Jim notices a jet contrail in the sky, showing proof that the outside world is still active.

After luring West away from the mansion with a siren, Jim returns and frees Private Mailer in order to infect and kill the remaining soldiers. Corporal Mitchell attempts to abduct Selena, but Jim kills him. Jim, Selena, and Hannah attempt to escape in Frank's cab, but West, who has hidden in the back seat, shoots Jim in the stomach. Hannah retaliates by putting the cab in reverse, into the path of Mailer before stopping. Mailer to burst through the rear window and drags West out before mauling and beating him to death as the car drives away.

Another twenty-eight days later, Jim recovers at a remote cottage in Cumbria, where the infected are shown lying on the roads, dying of starvation. As a Hawker Hunter jet flies overhead, Jim, Selena, and Hannah unfurl a huge cloth banner spelling the word "HELLO". All three survivors wave at the jet, and wonder among themselves if the pilot has spotted them.

== Cast ==
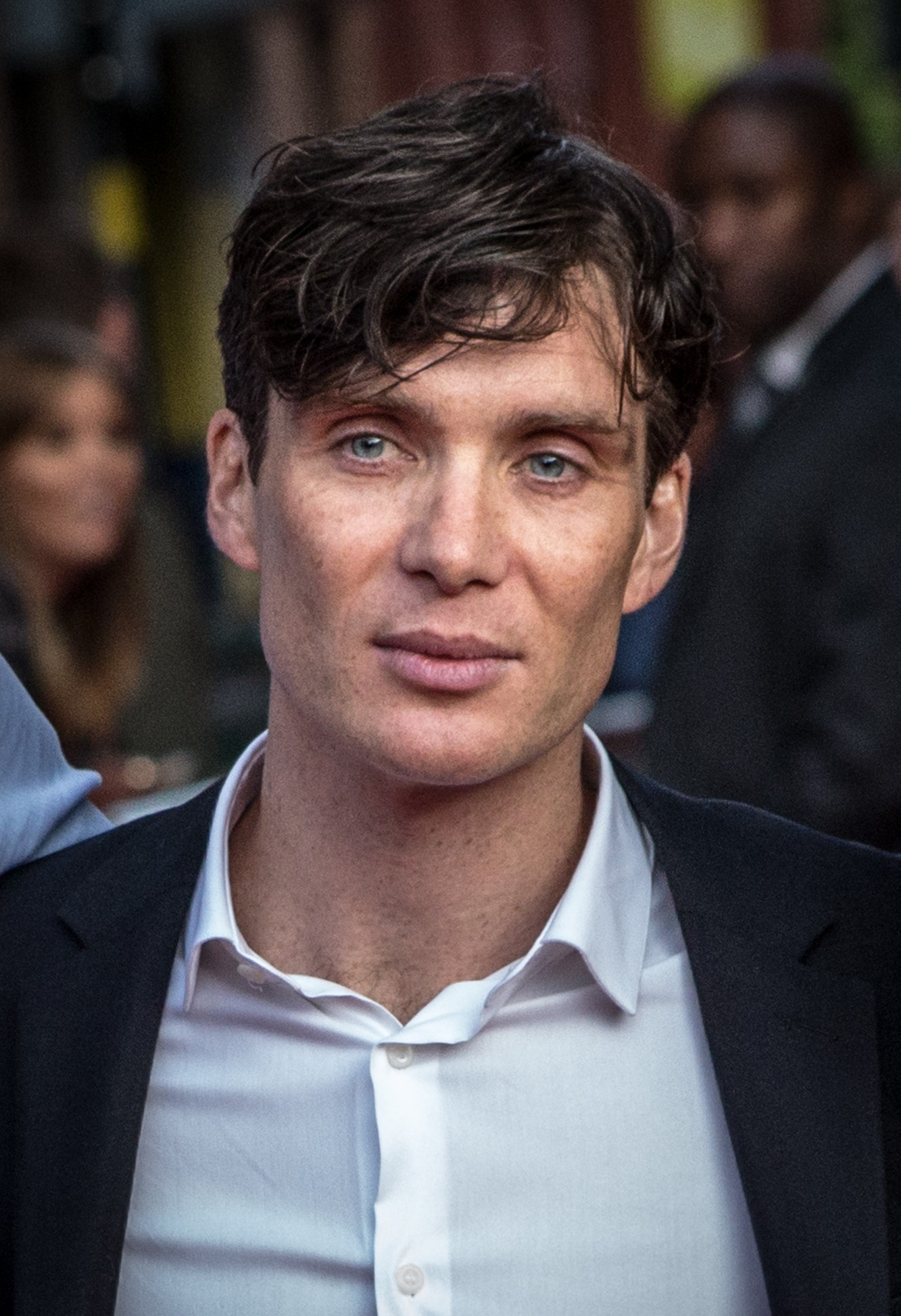
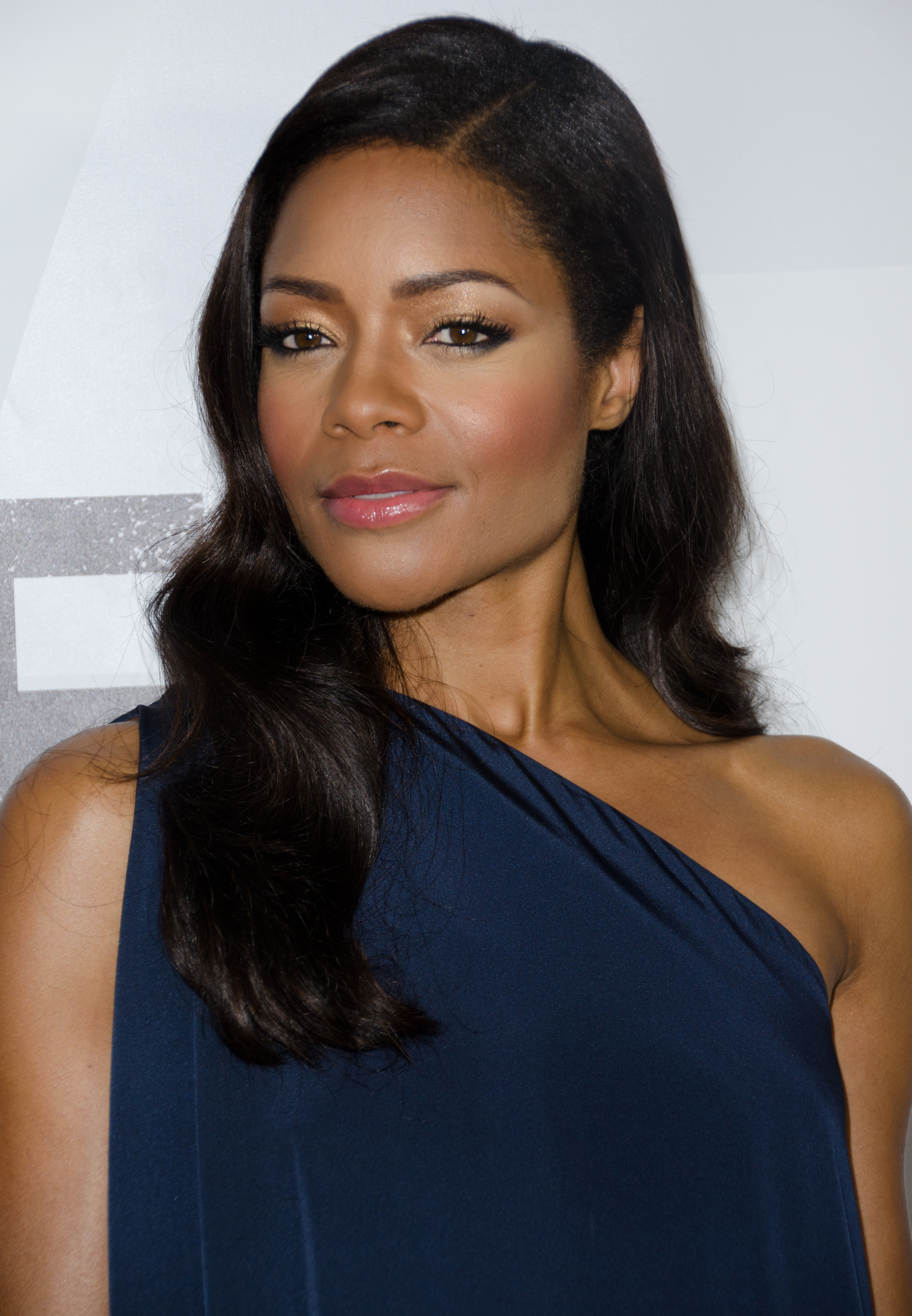
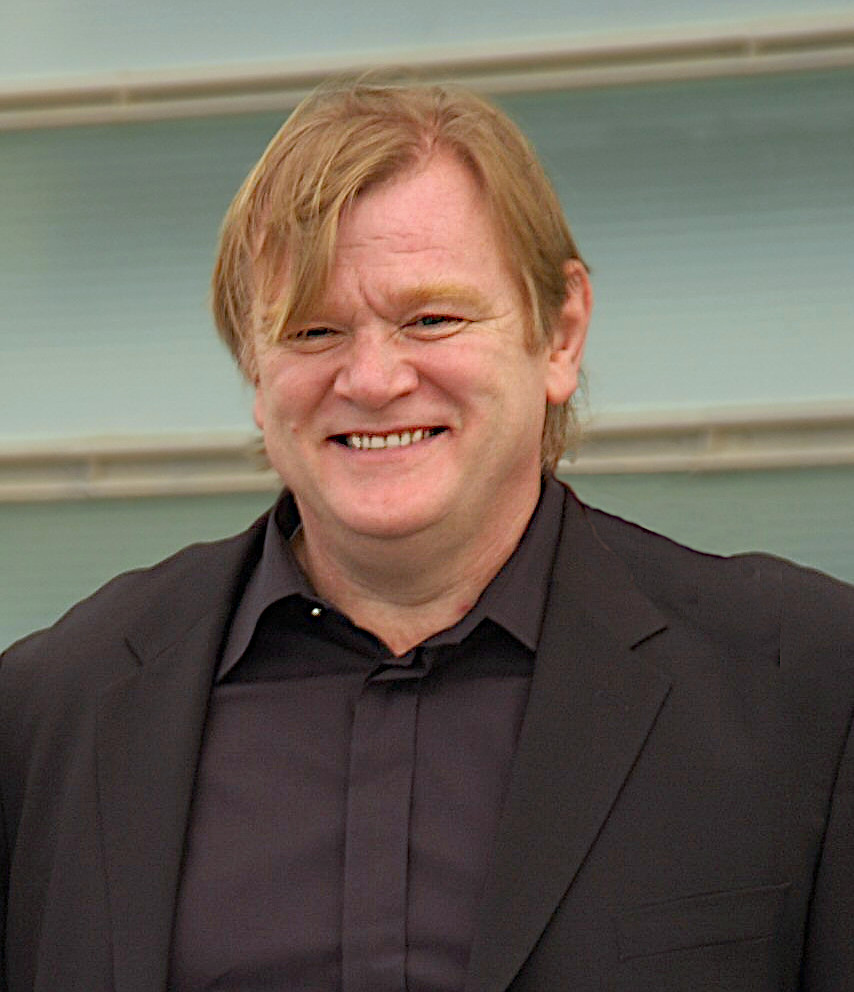
Cillian Murphy, Naomie Harris, and Brendan Gleeson star in the film.
- Cillian Murphy as Jim, a bicycle courier who was previously in a coma
- Naomie Harris as Selena, a survivor in London
- Brendan Gleeson as Frank, a taxi driver
- Megan Burns as Hannah, Frank's young daughter
- Christopher Eccleston as Major Henry West, the leader of the soldiers
- Noah Huntley as Mark, a fellow survivor with Selena
- Stuart McQuarrie as Sergeant Farrell
- Ricci Harnett as Corporal Mitchell
- Leo Bill as Private Jones
- Luke Mably as Private Clifton
- Junior Laniyan as Private Bell
- Ray Panthaki as Private Bedford
- Sanjay Rambaruth as Private Davis
- Marvin Campbell as Private Mailer

Additionally, Alex Palmer, Bindu De Stoppani, and Jukka Hiltunen portray the animal liberation activists, while David Schneider portrays a scientist at the laboratory. Christopher Dunne and Emma Hitching appear as Jim's parents. Toby Sedgwick plays an infected priest encountered by Jim. Sedgwick would later return to the series in a behind the scenes role, acting as the movement coach for 28 Years Later (2025).

== Production ==
=== Development ===
Early influences on writer Alex Garland included the George A. Romero films Night of the Living Dead (1968) and Dawn of the Dead (1978), which he loved as a child. Garland claimed to have largely forgotten about the zombie genre until he played the video game Resident Evil (1996), which reminded him how much he loved zombies after "having not really encountered zombies for quite a while". Director Danny Boyle liked Garland's screenplay for a proposed zombie film, having directed the 2000 film adaptation of Garland's 1996 novel The Beach.

Rather than portraying zombies as supernatural beings, the film's rage virus was conceived as a biological contagion. Boyle and Garland intended the virus to amplify an inherent aspect of human nature—psychological aggression—depicting rage as an uncontrollable viral force intrinsic to humanity rather than merely a physical infection. This was designed to serve as a metaphor for contemporary social rage, including road rage, air rage, and other everyday aggressive behaviours. Additional influence was drawn from contemporary cases in the United Kingdom of BSE (mad cow disease) and foot-and-mouth disease.

Producer Andrew Macdonald had access to funding from the National Lottery and pitched it to Universal Pictures, who declined to support it. Budget constraints proved to be an issue, with Christopher Eccleston having to take an emergency pay cut. In June 2001, it was reported that Fox Searchlight Pictures had picked up for co-financing as well as worldwide distribution.

Boyle identified John Wyndham's 1951 novel The Day of the Triffids as Garland's original inspiration for the story.

Five months after the film was released in Europe, video game publisher NovaLogic hosted a graffiti competition in a cross-promotion with the game Devastation (2003). The connection was owed mainly to the similar theme of a devastated world. The prizes consisted of signed screenplay copies and posters along with DVDs. For the Infected, Boyle took inspiration from real-life diseases, particularly Ebola, with aspects of rabies.

=== Casting ===
On the DVD commentary, Boyle explains that with the aim of preserving the suspension of disbelief, relatively unknown actors were cast in the film. Cillian Murphy had starred primarily in small independent films, while Naomie Harris had acted on British television as a child, and Megan Burns had only one previous film credit. However, Christopher Eccleston and Brendan Gleeson were well-known character actors. Murphy originally auditioned for the role with a modern Received Pronunciation accent, as Jim was written to be English. However, during filming, Boyle and Murphy decided to revert to the actor's natural accent, and rewrote the character as Irish. James McAvoy auditioned for a role as an Infected.

=== Filming ===
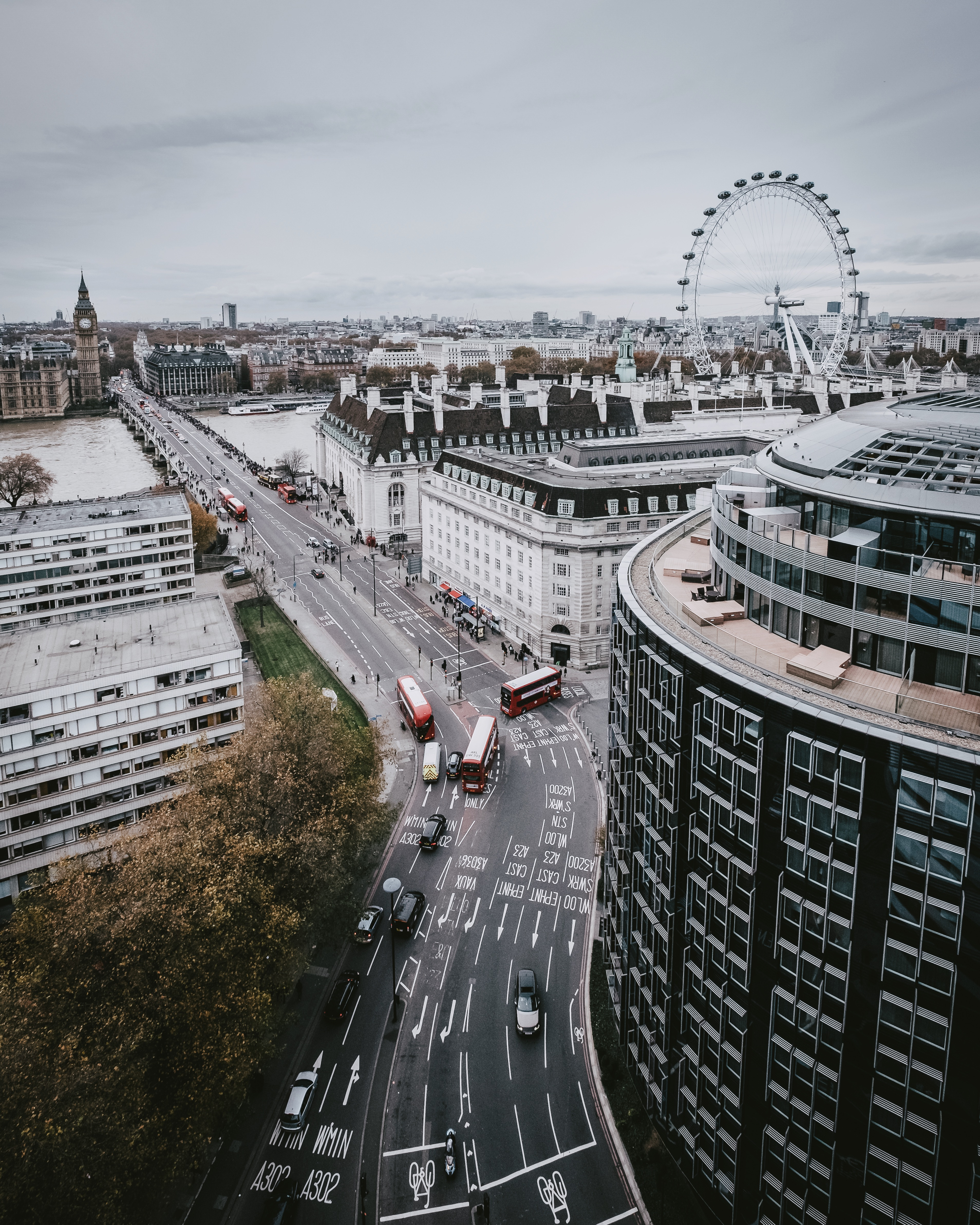
Busy areas of Central London, including Westminster Bridge, had to be filmed early in the morning or while the crew briefly closed streets for the film's opening sequence.

The film features scenes set in normally bustling parts of London, such as Westminster Bridge, Piccadilly Circus, Horse Guards Parade and Oxford Street. To depict these locations as desolate, the film crew closed off sections of street for minutes at a time, usually on Sunday mornings. They typically had around 45 minutes after dawn to shoot the locations devoid of members of the public and traffic.

The majority of the film (except for the final sequence when the military plane finds Jim, Selena, and Hannah, which was shot on 35mm film) was shot on Canon XL1 digital video (DV) cameras, which were smaller and more manoeuvrable than traditional film cameras, which would have been impractical on such brief shoots. The scenes of the empty M1 motorway were also filmed within limited periods during which a mobile police roadblock slowed traffic sufficiently to leave a long section of carriageway empty. The section of the motorway depicted runs near Milton Keynes, Buckinghamshire, around 150 miles southeast of Manchester.

For the London scene in which Jim walks by an overturned double-decker bus, the film crew placed the bus on its side and removed it when the shot was finished, all within about 20 minutes. The crew had asked Westminster City Council for permission to place the bus outside Downing Street, which was denied; when they arrived there at 4am and nobody from the council was present, they placed the bus there anyway.

The September 11 attacks took place during filming. Boyle notes the parallel between the "missing persons" flyers seen at the beginning of the film and similar flyers posted in New York City in the wake of the attacks. Boyle said his crew probably would not have been granted permission to close off Whitehall for filming after the terrorist attacks

The mansion used in the film was Trafalgar Park near Salisbury. The old ruins used as the setting for an idyllic interlude in their journey to Manchester were those of Waverley Abbey, Surrey. The end scenes of the film with Jim, Selena and Hannah living in a rural cottage were filmed around Ennerdale in Cumbria. The production team hired an optometrist to supervise with the red contact lenses needed for cast members playing the infected.

After several different pitches for a new ending, with the original ending which featured Jim's death having tested badly with audiences, the studio approved the ending eventually used. The crew arranged for a real jet to fly overhead for them to film, as this was cheaper than approximately £70,000 for a computer-generated one.

=== Alternative endings ===
The DVD extras include three alternative endings, all of which conclude with Jim dying. The first alternate ending involves Jim dying of his gunshot wounds in a hospital despite Selena and Hannah's efforts to save him, concluding with the two of them leaving the hospital to an unknown fate. The US cinematic release included this ending after the film's credits in response to intense online debates over whether or not it was a more appropriate conclusion than the official ending. In the second, Jim dreams of the accident that left him in a coma as he dies from his gunshot wounds. The third, a more radical departure, was presented only in storyboards; instead of Frank being killed by soldiers after being infected, the other survivors tie him up and at the blockade discover the laboratory that created the rage virus, where Jim undergoes a full blood transfusion in order to save Frank, at the cost of his own life. This ending was never filmed due to Boyle and Garland agreeing that it lacked plausibility.

== Music ==
John Murphy – "In the House - In a Heartbeat"
Music from the 2002 film 28 Days Later.

The film's score was composed by John Murphy, featuring electric guitar and atmospheric electronic production. It also features tracks from Brian Eno, Grandaddy and Blue States, and was released in a combined score and song compilation in 2003. A heavily edited version of the track "East Hastings" by the post-rock band Godspeed You! Black Emperor appears in the film, but the track is excluded from the soundtrack, because Boyle could only obtain the rights to use it in the film.

28 Days Later: The Soundtrack Album was released on 17 June 2003. A modified version of the track "In the House - In a Heartbeat" was used as the character Big Daddy's theme in the 2010 film Kick-Ass. The same song was played in the 2012 advertisement campaign of Louis Vuitton, "L'Invitation au voyage". In 2019, the song was remixed and used in the video game Metro Exodus.

== Release and reception ==
=== Box office ===
28 Days Later was a considerable success at the box office and became highly profitable on a budget of about £5 million. In the UK, it took in £6.1 million, while in the US, it became a surprise hit, taking over $45 million despite a limited release at fewer than 1,500 screens across the country. The film garnered over $82.8 million worldwide.

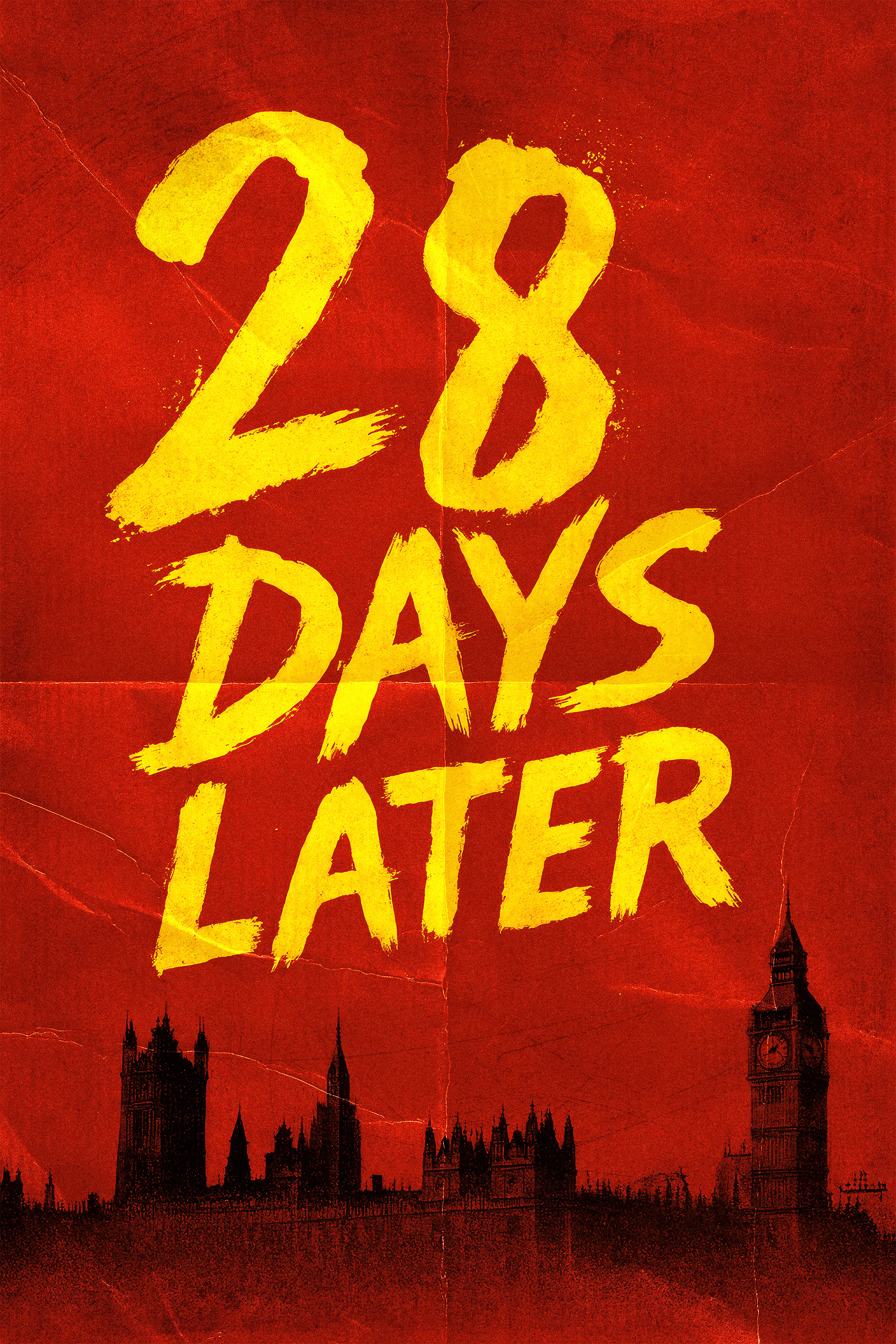
Retrospective screening poster variation

=== Critical reception ===
Critical views of the film were positive. On the film review aggregator Rotten Tomatoes, 87% of 240 critics' reviews gave 28 Days Later a positive review, with an average rating of 7.60/10. The site's consensus reads: "Kinetically directed by Danny Boyle, 28 Days Later is both a terrifying zombie movie and a sharp political allegory." On Metacritic, the film received a rating of 73 out of 100 based on 39 reviews, indicating "generally favourable reviews".

Bravo awarded it the 100th spot on their list of "The 100 Scariest Movie Moments" in a four-episode 2004 television series. The commentators explained that making the zombies move fast for the first time was a bright and effective idea. In 2007, Stylus Magazine named it the second-best zombie movie of all time. The film also ranked at number 456 in Empire's 2008 list of the 500 greatest movies of all time. Bloody Disgusting ranked the film seventh in their list of the Top 20 Horror Films of the Decade, with the article saying "Zombie movie? Political allegory? Humanist drama? 28 Days Later is all of those things and more—a genuine work of art by a director at the top of his game. What's so amazing about the film is the way it so expertly balances scenes of white-knuckled, hell-for-leather horror with moments of intimate beauty." In 2017, a poll of 150 actors, directors, writers, producers and critics for Time Out magazine ranked it the 97th-best British film ever. Rotten Tomatoes lists the film on its 100 Best Zombie Movies, Ranked by Tomatometer. In July 2025, it was one of the films voted for the "Readers' Choice" edition of The New York Times' list of "The 100 Best Movies of the 21st Century", finishing at number 156. That same month, it ranked number 53 on Rolling Stone's list of "The 100 Best Movies of the 21st Century," and The Hollywood Reporter ranked the film at number six on its list of the "25 Best Horror Movies of the 21st Century."

=== Accolades ===
- Best Horror Film (2003 US Academy of Science Fiction, Fantasy & Horror Films – Saturn Award)
- Best British Film (Empire Award)
- Danny Boyle (Grand Prize of European Fantasy Film in Silver)
- Best Director – Danny Boyle (International Fantasy Film Award)
- Best International Film – Danny Boyle (Narcisse Award)
- Best Breakthrough Performance – Naomie Harris (Black Reel)
- Best Cinematographer – Anthony Dod Mantle (European Film Award)

=== Home media ===
28 Days Later was released on DVD and VHS in Europe on 16 May 2003 and in North America on 21 October 2003, both by 20th Century Fox Home Entertainment. DVD bonus features included three alternate endings, an audio commentary, a making-of featurette, a Jacknife Lee music video, deleted scenes, photo galleries, and trailers. A Blu-ray Disc version was released on 9 October 2007 alongside 28 Weeks Later, which included the DVD bonus features and added an additional alternate ending.

The film was notorious for being largely unavailable to purchase on home video, attributed to out-of-print copies and expensive secondhand prices of the film on Blu-ray, DVD and VHS, as well as its unavailability on digital. In February 2024, it was revealed that producer Andrew Macdonald had bought back the rights to the film from Disney (current parent company of Searchlight Pictures), and promptly sold it to Sony Pictures Releasing through its Columbia Pictures label (after winning a highly competitive studio bidding war in January 2024, beating out Warner Bros. Pictures, Universal Pictures, and Paramount Pictures), along with the rights to the 28 Years Later trilogy (28 Years Later, 28 Years Later: The Bone Temple, and an untitled third film), though 28 Weeks Later, in which 20th Century Studios was a co-producer, remained with Disney. In December 2024, following a largely favourable response from the public to the trailer for 28 Years Later, Sony announced that it would be making 28 Days Later available for purchase on digital and rental platforms from 18 December. The following year, Sony Pictures Home Entertainment announced a 4K remaster of the film to be released with a steelbook cover, which was released on 1 September 2026.

== Legacy and cultural impact ==
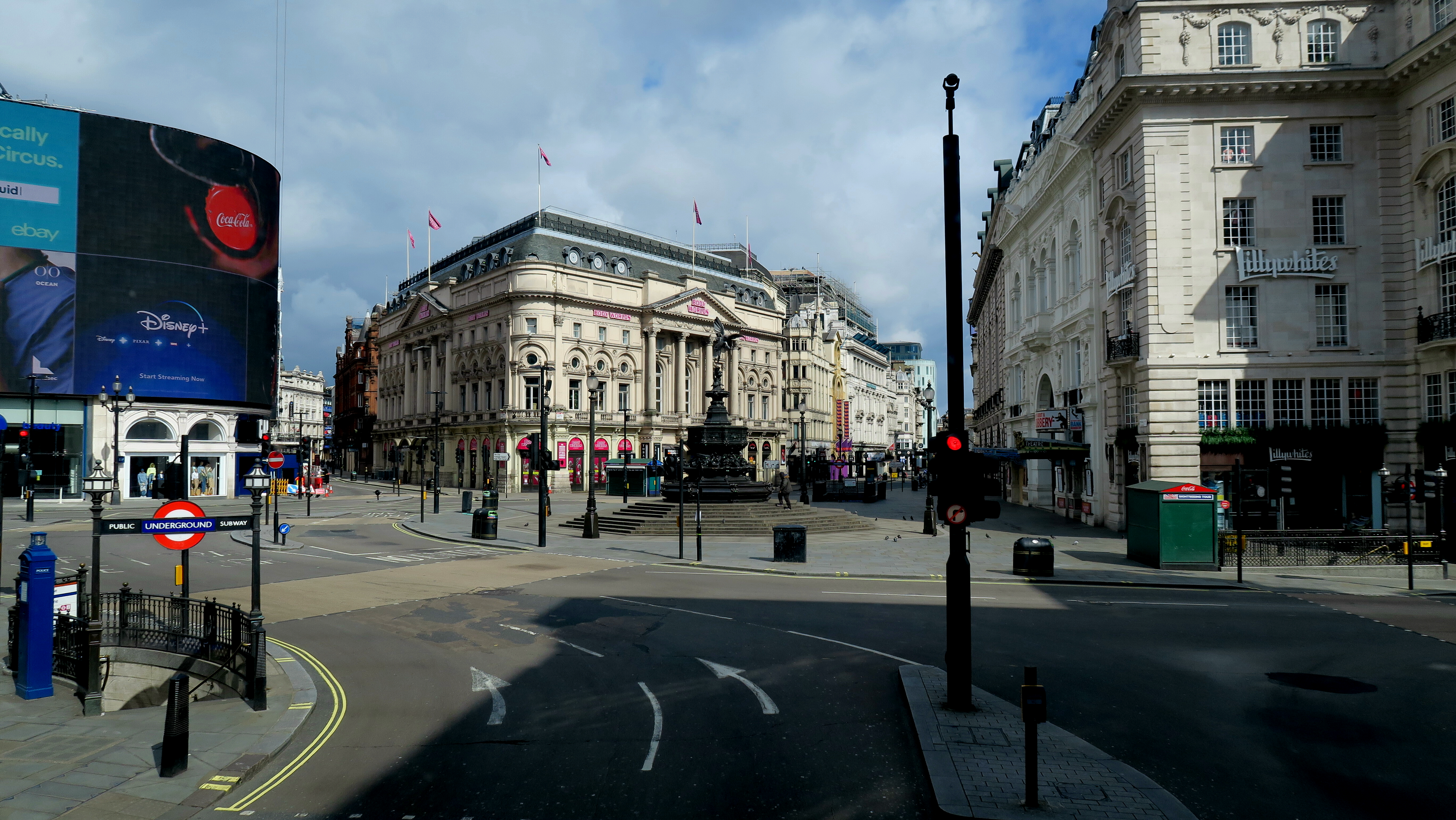
During the COVID-19 pandemic, some media commentary compared images of deserted city streets (such as London, pictured) to scenes in 28 Days Later.

28 Days Later had an impact on subsequent horror films, and is credited with starting a revival for the zombie genre, along with the Resident Evil franchise. The 2004 remake of Dawn of the Dead, for example, was influenced by 28 Days Later. 28 Days Later was also followed by other infection films. Subsequent film examples include: Shaun of the Dead (2004), Black Sheep (2006), I Am Legend (2007), Planet Terror (2007), Doomsday (2008), Dead Snow (2009), Zombieland (2009), Devil's Playground (2010), The Night Eats the World (2018), and Hemet, or the Landlady Don't Drink Tea (2023), as well as books such as World War Z (2006), Pride and Prejudice and Zombies (2009) and Warm Bodies (2010), and zombie-themed graphic novels and television shows such as The Walking Dead. The film was parodied in the South Park episode "Die Hippie, Die" (2005) and in The Simpsons episode "Treehouse of Horror XX" (2009). The zombie revival trend lasted for more than a decade after 28 Days Later, before eventually declining in popularity by the late 2010s.

During the COVID-19 pandemic, images of a national lockdown in the United Kingdom and stay-at-home orders elsewhere were compared to the opening sequence of 28 Days Later. In 2021, Megan Burns said of the film, "When I joined the cast of 28 Days Later I had no idea of how big a cultural impact it would have and what a game-changer it would be to the 'zombie' genre. Even now after all these years, (or perhaps especially now with the current situation), people want to talk about the film and that's incredible." Christopher Nolan said he cast Murphy as Scarecrow in Batman Begins (2005) after being impressed by his performance in 28 Days Later.

== Subsequent media ==
=== Sequels ===
A sequel, 28 Weeks Later, was released on 11 May 2007. Danny Boyle and Alex Garland took producing roles alongside Andrew Macdonald. The plot revolves around the arrival of American troops about seven months after the incidents in the original film, attempting to restore order and revitalise a nearly desolate Britain. The cast includes Robert Carlyle, Rose Byrne, Jeremy Renner, Imogen Poots, Harold Perrineau, Catherine McCormack, Mackintosh Muggleton and Idris Elba.

A third film, 28 Years Later, was released on 20 June 2025, its development having been announced in January 2024. Danny Boyle had said in March 2007 that he would be interested in making a third film in the series, 28 Months Later. In 2019, he said "Alex Garland and I have a wonderful idea for the third part". 28 Years Later is considered the first instalment in a potential trilogy, with Boyle directing the first film and Garland writing all three. With a planned $75 million budget per instalment, the duo will also produce the trilogy alongside the original producer Andrew Macdonald and former Fox Searchlight Pictures head Peter Rice.

The fourth film, 28 Years Later: The Bone Temple, was directed by Nia DaCosta and filmed back-to-back with its predecessor. It premiered in the United Kingdom on 13 January 2026 as part of a double feature with 28 Years Later, followed by individual releases in the UK on 14 January and the United States on 16 January. The plot continues the narrative of the previous film and reintroduces the character portrayed by Cillian Murphy from 28 Days Later, setting up the fifth instalment of the franchise.

Following the success of 28 Years Later and The Bone Temple, Sony confirmed that the third and final film of the planned 28 Years Later trilogy is in development, with Danny Boyle returning as the director and Alex Garland writing the script.

=== Comic books ===
In 2007, Fox Atomic Comics, in association with HarperCollins, published 28 Days Later: The Aftermath, a graphic novel written by Steve Niles. The work serves as a tie-in to the films, depicting events surrounding the Rage virus outbreak and providing background that connects 28 Days Later with its sequel 28 Weeks Later.

A separate monthly comic book series, also titled 28 Days Later, was launched in 2009 by Boom! Studios following the closure of Fox Atomic. The series continues the story of Selena, one of the film's central characters, and explores her actions and whereabouts between the events of the two films.
