= Blue States (band) =

English electronic music group

- Origin: London, England
- Genres: Trip hop, experimental, electronica, downtempo
- Years active: 1997–present
- Label: Memphis Industries

Blue States is an English electronic music project led by multi-instrumentalist and producer Andy Dragazis. Formed in London in 1997, it became known for a cinematic sound combining electronic production, samples and live instrumentation, later expanding into more vocal- and guitar-based material.

The project's second album, Man Mountain (2002), included "Season Song", which was featured in the British horror film 28 Days Later.

Blue States has operated both as Dragazis's solo project and as a full band. For The Soundings (2004), singer and guitarist Chris Carr and drummer Jon Chandler joined as full-time members, while Dragazis later returned to working largely alone.

After a lengthy hiatus, the project returned with Restless Spheres (2016), followed by World Contact Day (2022) and Where the Fades Meet (2026), its seventh studio album.

== Discography ==
- Nothing Changes Under the Sun (2000)
- Man Mountain (2002)
- The Soundings (2004)
- First Steps Into... (2007)
- Sum of the Parts (2009), a B-Sides collection
- Restless Spheres (2016)
- World Contact Day (2022)
- Where The Fades Meet (24 July 2026)
