= JLA/The 99 =

Comic

Publication information
- Publisher: DC Comics; Teshkeel Comics
- Schedule: Monthly
- Format: Limited series
- Genre: Superhero; Crossover
- Publication date: October 2010 – March 2011
- No. of issues: 6
- Main character(s): Justice League of America; The 99

Creative team
- Written by: Fabian Nicieza; Stuart Moore
- Artist: Tom Derenick

JLA/The 99 is an American comic book limited series and intercompany crossover between DC Comics and Teshkeel Comics. The series chronicled a meeting between the superheroes of DC Comics' Justice League of America and Teshkeel Comics' The 99. It was written by Fabian Nicieza and Stuart Moore, and drawn by Tom Derenick.

== Publication history ==
The initial idea for the crossover came about as a result of a friendship between The 99's creator, Naif Al-Mutawa, and DC Comics writer Paul Levitz. The series ran for six issues, the first of which was released in October 2010.

== Plot ==
The plot of the series revolved around a worldwide threat that forces the members of The 99 and the Justice League to work together in order to save the planet.

The series took place within the established DC Universe, though it did not feature the members of writer James Robinson's contemporary Justice League, but rather a mix of characters from across the team's history. Superman, Batman, Wonder Woman (sporting the costume from J. Michael Straczynski's revamp of her title), the Carter Hall iteration of Hawkman, the John Stewart iteration of Green Lantern, the Barry Allen iteration of The Flash, the Ray Palmer iteration of the Atom, and the Jason Rusch/Ronnie Raymond iteration of Firestorm. Both Vixen and Doctor Light appear as well, highlighting the multicultural and international aspect of the team.

The series also introduced a new member of The 99.
