= Nightmare Factory =

Nightmare Factory may refer to:

- The Nightmare Factory, a comic book
- The Nightmare Factory: Volume 2, a comic book
- Nightmare Factory (film), a television documentary
- The Nightmare Factory, the name of a WWE ID professional wrestling academy that was formerly All Elite Wrestling's de facto training facility
