= The Nightmare Factory: Volume 2 =

Publication information
- Publisher: Fox Atomic Comics
- Format: Graphic Novel
- Publication date: September 2, 2008

Creative team as of 2008
- Written by: Thomas Ligotti; Stuart Moore; Joe Harris
- Artist(s): Vasilis Lolos; Toby Cypress; Bill Sienkiewicz; Nick Stakal; Jon Foster (cover artist)
- Editor(s): Heidi MacDonald; R. Eric Lieb

The Nightmare Factory: Volume 2, 2008, is the second volume in The Nightmare Factory series of graphic collections from Fox Atomic Comics, based on the individual short stories of Thomas Ligotti.

== Contents ==
- "Gas Station Carnivals", adapted by Joe Harris and Vasilis Lolos
- "The Clown Puppet", adapted by Joe Harris and Bill Sienkiewicz
- "The Chymist", adapted by Stuart Moore and Toby Cypress
- "The Sect of the Idiot", adapted by Stuart Moore and Nick Stakal
