= Zak Kadison =

American film producer

- Occupation: film producer

Zak Kadison is an American film producer best known for his work on the films Blood Creek, My Sassy Girl and Whisper. For a number of years he was a vice president of production for Fox Atomic before leaving to found Blacklight Transmedia with R. Eric Lieb, Mark Long and Joanna Alexander.

== Filmography ==
=== Film ===
- Blood Creek (2009) (co-producer)
- My Sassy Girl (2008) (co-producer)
- Whisper (2007) (producer)

=== Television ===
- Beyond (2016) (executive Producer, pilot)
