= 28 Days Later: The Aftermath =

2007 graphic novel

- Cover of 28 Days Later: The Aftermath
- Date: April 3, 2007
- Publisher: Fox Atomic Comics

Creative team
- Writers: Steve Niles
- Artists: Cover: Tim Bradstreet; Stories 1 & 4: Dennis Calero; Story 2: Diego Olmos (Pencils); Ken Branch (Inks); Story 3: Nat Jones
- Colourists: Dennis Calero

Original publication
- Language: English
- ISBN: 0061236764

28 Days Later: The Aftermath is a graphic novel, serving as a continuation to the film 28 Days Later. It was written by Steve Niles and distributed by Fox Atomic Comics. It was released on April 3, 2007. It was the first graphic novel released by publisher.

== Premise ==
The book bridges the gap between the original film and its sequel film, 28 Weeks Later. It explores four interconnecting stories and delves deeper into the development of the Rage virus, the battle for survival that ensued once it was unleashed in London, and what it finally took to restore order in the ravaged city.

== Plot ==
The Aftermath is divided into four stories ranging in setting from shortly before the outbreak to several months afterward. The first three stories each follow separate groups or individuals; the fourth story brings the survivors of these stories together for their ultimate fate.

=== Stage 1: Development ===
At an unspecified time before the initial outbreak, two scientists – the prudent Clive and the reckless Warren – are attempting to develop an inhibitor which can be used to control aggressive impulses in humans. Warren is able to secure a violent criminal as a human test subject after bribing a police officer. When the subject proves uncontrollable, Warren and Clive are forced to kill him and hide his body. Despite his misgivings about Warren and his ethics, Clive is now irrevocably tied to the project.

Deciding that the only feasible means of widely disseminating the inhibitor is through a contagion, Warren genetically modifies the Ebola virus to carry it. However, the virus mutates and reverses the inhibitor's effect – 'Rage', a highly contagious virus that locks its victims within seconds into a permanent homicidal fury state, has been born. After a physical fight with Warren, Clive quits the project. Later, he makes a call from a public telephone to an eco-terrorist group called the Animal Freedom Front, then shoots himself in the head.

Meanwhile, Warren talks to an unknown person on the telephone and informs him about the inhibitor's reverse effect. The man enlightens Warren that this could have "other applications" when the telephone suddenly cuts out. At this moment, Warren hears a strange noise coming from down the hall and seems distressed by it. He approaches a door noticing it was left open. Upon entering the door, Warren is abruptly ambushed by an ape that vomits in his face and infects him with Rage. It is implied that the chimp is one of the animal test subjects freed by the eco-terrorists, as seen at the start of the film 28 Days Later.

=== Stage 2: Outbreak ===
On the day following the laboratory break-in, a family of five – parents Roger and Barb, and children Sid, Sophie, and Liam – is picnicking at a park in Cambridge. Liam, the youngest son, is attacked and infected by one of the freed chimps, which Roger kills. A team of paramedics rush to Liam's aid and instruct the family to follow their ambulance to London. Along the way, Liam's family witnesses scenes of carnage as the Rage virus precedes them. When Liam infects the paramedics and the three attack the ambulance driver, the family realizes that something is terribly wrong.

Days later, the four survivors hide out in a barricaded dwelling in London, hearing through the radio that the Prime Minister has declared a state of emergency. The family follows Sid's suggestion of escaping via the River Thames. The Infected chase the family on their way to Westminster Bridge. Roger and Barbara urge the remaining children to jump down to the motorboats floating below, and promise they will follow. Instead, they remain on the bridge for a last stand while allowing Sid and Sophie to escape upriver undetected.

=== Stage 3: Decimation ===
One month after the outbreak, a lone survivor named Hugh is living in deserted London and hunts Infected. After killing an Infected, Hugh is attacked by another survivor wearing SWAT gear and a hockey mask. Evading the assailant's hail of fire, Hugh makes for safety and plans to eliminate this apparent threat. After being ambushed by Hugh, the other survivor retreats to his commandeered military transport. Hugh douses the other survivor’s vehicle with perfume from his rooftop perch, which attracts a large number of Infected; caught by the Infected, the other survivor is shot in the head by Hugh, who then ignites the petrol tank and kills a large number of Infected. Afterwards, Hugh sees several U.S. Navy F-14 Tomcats making a low pass over central London.

=== Stage 4: Quarantine ===
Two months after the outbreak, Sid and Sophie have found shelter at a refugee center. The children meet the other characters – Sophie meets Clive, who survived his suicide attempt and hides his involvement in the development of the Rage virus, while Sid meets Hugh, who was brought to the camp by the American occupation force. Eventually, Hugh convinces Sid, Sophie, and Clive that the military has ulterior motives and that they must escape.

After stealing uniforms and weapons, the group is intercepted by soldiers during their escape attempt. Sid and Hugh are killed holding off the soldiers. Clive stops Sophie and reveals his involvement with the virus, warning that it could possibly mutate again. He asks her to help him find a way to make things right. Instead, Sophie kisses him, and then shoots him in the head. Smiling, Sophie allows a sniper aboard the pursuit helicopter to kill her with a rifle shot through the head.

== See also ==
- List of comics based on films
