= Wham! Bam! Islam! =

2011 documentary

- Directed by: Isaac Solotaroff
- Country of origin: United States
- Original language: English

Production
- Running time: 66 minutes

Original release
- Network: PBS
- Release: 2011

Wham! Bam! Islam! is a 2011 PBS documentary by Isaac Solotaroff broadcast in October that year as the season premiere of PBS's series "Independent Lens".

The documentary follows Naif Al-Mutawa, creator of the comic book The 99 and the animated TV-series The 99 and was pitched at the 2009 Sheffield Doc/Fest MeetMarket.
