= The 99 (TV series) =

Television series

- Based on: The 99 by Naif Al-Mutawa
- Directed by: Dave Osborne
- Country of origin: United Kingdom
- No. of seasons: 2
- No. of episodes: 52

Production
- Camera setup: Musa Rosstic
- Production company: Endemol Productions UK

Original release
- Network: The Hub (planned)
- Release: 2011 – 2012

The 99 is a 2011–2012 British animated series directed by Dave Osborne and based on the comic book series of the same name created by Naif Al-Mutawa.

The series was planned to air on the TV channel The Hub in the United States, but didn't make it due to controversy.

== Plot ==
It is said that all the darkness of the world
could be shattered by the light in just one pure heart.
Imagine, then, the hope that would spread
if 99 of the pure-hearted came together as one.

— Opening narration of first episode

Dr Ramzi Razem and The 99 are introduced and they realise for what they should be using their powers. Friendship and cooperation across differing cultures is one of the driving sentiments in the stories.

The mysterious Rughal wishes to harness the power of the powerful noor stones for his own gains. "Noor" is Arabic for "light".

== Voice cast ==
- Bruce Hayward as Doctor Ramzi Razem (season 1)
- Darren Osborne as Doctor Ramzi Razem (season 2)
- Erich Boehm as Rughal (season 1)
- Justin Krawczyk as Rughal (season 2)
- Sara-Clare Lajeunesse as Dana Ibrahim ("Noora the Light")
- Aris Athanasopoulos as Nawaf Al Bilali ("Jabbar the Powerful")
- Simon Miron as "Jabbar the Powerful" (season 2)
- Lamont James as John Weller ("Darr the Afflicter")
- Cole Promane as Miklos Szekelyhidi ("Jami the Assembler")
- Dominique Kamras as Catarina Barbosa ("Mumita the Destroyer")
- Jessie Behan as Alex ("Raqib the Watcher")
- Kaitlin Mamie as Alex ("Raqib the Watcher") (season 2)
- Dave Pender as Zoran
- Jacob James as James Higgins ("Red Shroud")
- David Godfrey as Thiab Al-Daham ("Blackwolf") / Various
- Daniel Davis as Guenther Gerhardt ("Hammerforce")
- Matthew Gorman as Toro Ridwan ("Fattah the Opener")
- Ty Kostyk as Jianyu ("The Savage")
- Scott Lancastle as Professor Mindo / Murk
- David Findlay as The Pathologist
- Al Kussin as The Pathologist
- Andrew Barbosa as Jaleel the Majestic
- Matt Hardy as Awang / Ben Hargreaves
- Ashleigh Midanik as Rafie the Lifter / Murat
- Sylvie Pamphile as Sphinx
- Kimberly Persona as Rola Hadramy ("Batina the Hidden")
- Trevhon Samuel as Bari the Healer
- Lisa Seward as Buran
- Amanda Jane Smith as Mujiba the Responder
- Sasha White as Aleem the All Knowing
- Dave Roberts as Kyra Wiseman / Badr / News Reporter / Parking Officer
- Conrad Bailey as Rahisia
- Steven Boleantu as Salaam
- Laura Caswell as Christa Clahane
- Shawn Devlin as Tom King
- David Fenner as Husam / Shireer
- Alex Fiddes as Mourad
- Vivian Hisey as Rabiah
- Danny MacDonald as Fakir
- Erica McMaster as Ingrid Wirsig
- Chelsea Oswald as Noaf
- Zach Smadu as Budi
- Brian R. Sousa as Laval
- Grant Tilley as Rami
- Eric Boehm as Jeri Craden
- Supinder Wraich as Hadya the Guide
- Christa Clahone as Hadya the Guide
- Zena Driver as Widad the Loving
- Aaron Fisher as Dee
- Bill Hunt as Amanda Mountsford
- Kris Siddiqi as Razors Edge
- Daniel James as Razors Edge
- Tim Keele as The Guardian
- Erin Pitt as Samda the Invulnerable
- Victoria Lacquaniti as Samda the Invulnerable
- Brooke Mackay as Posy
- Nica Michaels as Baqi the Everlasting
- Eric Miinch as Mukit the Nourisher
- John Palmieri as Nestor Rios
- Tanya Ritoul as Mussawira the Organiser
- Clara Scott as Wassi the Vast
- Benny Feng as Wassi the Vast / Ashok
- Emily Coutts as Mubdia the Creative Twins
- Braedon Soltys as Mubdi the Creative Twins
- Joseph Woods as Baeth the Sender
- Marni Van Dyk as Baeth the Sender
- Mena Massoud as Hafiz the Preserver / Dave / Saad

== Background, motivation, financing and production ==
The TV series is based on the comic book series The 99 created by Kuwait-born and United States-educated Naif Al-Mutawa who felt Muslim children needed a new set of heroes to look up to, to counter jihadist role models. In a 2011 interview with Fox News, Al-Mutawa was quoted "When those guys hijacked those airplanes [on Sept. 11] and committed a crime in the name of my religion, they put a stain on my religion that only God can erase. But they not only hijacked those planes, they hijacked what Islam meant." He also expressed a desire to bridge the cultural divide between the East and the West and said that though he used an Islamic archetype, the stories don't mention Islam, Allah or the Koran but are instead based on values shared by everybody. The comic books were both praised and criticised: In 2009, the comic book series was named as one of the top 20 trends in the world by Forbes magazine and was praised by Barack Obama for attempting to improve dialogue between the US and the Muslim world.

In November 2006 a Bahrain investment bank approved $25 million to help finance Teshkeel Media Group and pay to launch an animated series for television. A 13 episode first season of the series was announced, but was later changed to 26 episodes. In total, 52 episodes were produced.

Around 300 people, with director Osborne and Naif in London, an animation team in India a voice recording team in Canada and writers in Los Angeles, worked on the series for over two-and-a-half years. Director Osborne, with more than 20 years of animation experience and having worked at Cosgrove Hall, called The 99 the most technically complex project he had ever been involved in.

Creator Naif Al-Mutawa and his work on the comic books and the TV series were the subjects of the 60 minutes long PBS documentary Wham! Bam! Islam! by Isaac Solotaroff broadcast in October 2011 as the season premiere of PBS's series "Independent Lens".

The interactive website the99kids.com was designed by Aardman Animations.

== Episodes ==
No.	Title	Original release date
1	"Darr, the Afflicter"	October 8, 2011
A man called Doctor Ramzi Razem, Noora the Light and Jabbar the Powerful recruit Darr. Darr survived a car accident caused by William Danford, but it killed his parents. Darr learns to not only afflict pain but also to relieve pain.
2	"Noora, the Light"	TBA
Noora contemplates her background and The 99 meet Jami the Assembler who elects to join Rughal instead of The 99.
3	"Jabbar, the Powerful"	TBA
On a detour to Cairo, the back story of Rughal is told. At an underground fighting arena, The 99 encounter Hammerforce and a fighter called Shadow cloak. Mumita the Destroyer is recruited and in Seville, Spain, The 99 learn a surprising fact.
4	"The 99, Unbound"	TBA
Ramzi is kidnapped by Rughal who coerce The 99 to cooperate with him. Joining forces with Jami and Zoran they free Ramzi in Indonesia in an operation in which Higgins is hurt. Ramzi and The 99 settle at the ruins of the Fortress of Knowledge.
5	"Fattah, the Opener"	TBA
With Higgins hurt, his son Alex is left alone but joins a group of street children. When retreating after a conflict with Darr, Mumita catches a glimpse of Fattah. Mumita and Darr follow him back to Indonesia and save the street children from a fire. The children move to an orphanage. Meanwhile, Rughal "improves" Higgins.
6	"Rise of the Red Shroud"	TBA
At the orphanage, Alex misses his father Higgins who has transformed under Rughal's hand. Alex and Higgins reunite, but the transformation make it impossible for Higgins to care for Alex. Ramzi is contacted by friend Blair who has been following Higgins. Rughal promises to restore Higgins if he retrieves the noor stones. In a fight, The 99 refuses to give up the stones and Higgins walks away with Alex. Later, Higgins seek out Blair and asks him to care for Alex until he can do so himself.
7	"Blackwolf"	TBA
Under an alias, Rughal takes a position as head of research at multi-national conglomerate Chang Corporation under young Jianyu. With the help of new recruits Professor Mindo and The Pathologist, he transforms henchman Thiab into Blackwolf. When doing so, he also ensures that he will keep Blackwolf under his command. Alex has found a home with Blair and The 99 and in an attempt to secure his stay, one night he visits an excavation site of the Fortress of Knowledge in search of a noor stone of his own. The site is a trap and The 99 must help Alex from the trap.
8	"Legacy"	TBA
Blair, fearing Rughal is creating technology that mimics the noor stones, travels to Hong Kong also hoping to find a cure for Higgins' condition. Higgins's son Alex, who believes he may accidentally taken some of Blair's powers convinces Fattah to bring him there. Blair is mortally wounded by Blackwolf, but as he dies he asks Alex to take his noor stone and continue as his successor. Before teleporting home, Alex fails to retrieve Rughal's artificial noor stone. Fearing Rughal may use it to cause harm, he decides to instead destroy it, knowing it may also not be used to help his father. Alex joins The 99 as "Raqib the Watcher".
9	"The Power of One"	TBA
Darr is arrested in India after William Danford has disappeared while on a business trip in Shanghai to make a deal with the Chang Corporation. Darr, Jabbar and Fattah search for him.
10	"The Sphinx"	TBA

== Marketing, promotion and reception ==
A preview was released on The 99's own website and YouTube, in December 2009.

The series met with some resistance in the USA to some part because of the character Batina the Hidden wearing a burqa and a couple of the characters wearing the hijab. In other parts of the world the series was criticized because not all the female characters were covered in some way.

In 2014, several months after the show had been off the air in Saudi Arabia, a fatwa was issued from the Grand Mufti of Saudi Arabia and the Higher Council of Clerics calling the work "evil". Naif Al-Mutawa asked the Higher Council of Clerics to reconsider, highlighting that The 99 was based on values like generosity and mercy and had created positive role models for children using Islam as a base for its storytelling. He also asked the work be judged by its intent.

== Awards ==
Ashleigh Midanik was nominated to the 2013 Young Artist Award for Best Performance in a Voice-Over Role – Television – Young Actress for the portrayal of Rafie the Lifter / Murat.

== The 99 Unbound ==
The first few episodes were released as a feature film, The 99 Unbound in 2011, telling the origins of the core group and how they come to terms with their powers.
