= The Nightmare Factory =

Comics anthology adapting stories by Thomas Ligotti

Publication information
- Publisher: Fox Atomic Comics
- Format: Graphic Novel
- Publication date: September 4, 2007

Creative team as of 2007
- Written by: Thomas Ligotti; Stuart Moore; Joe Harris
- Artist(s): Colleen Doran; Ben Templesmith; Ted McKeever; Michael Gaydos; Ashley Wood (cover artist)
- Editor(s): Heidi MacDonald; R. Eric Lieb

The Nightmare Factory is a 2007 comics anthology from Fox Atomic Comics adapting individual short stories by Thomas Ligotti. The second book in the series, The Nightmare Factory – Volume 2, was published in September 2008. It features new short essays by Ligotti.

== Contents ==
- "The Last Feast of Harlequin" (Stuart Moore & Colleen Doran)
- "Dream of a Mannikin" (Stuart Moore & Ben Templesmith)
- "Dr. Locrian's Asylum"' (Joe Harris & Ted McKeever)
- "Teatro Grottesco" (Joe Harris & Michael Gaydos)
