= The 99 =

Comic

Publication information
- Publisher: Teshkeel Comics
- Schedule: Monthly
- Format: Ongoing series
- Genre: Superhero
- Publication date: August 2007 – September 2014
- No. of issues: 48

Creative team
- Created by: Naif Al-Mutawa
- Written by: Naif Al-Mutawa

The 99 (Arabic: الـ99 or التسعة وتسعون) is a comic book, created by Naif Al-Mutawa and published by Teshkeel Comics, featuring a team of superheroes with special abilities based on the 99 attributes of Allah in Islam, though some are virtues encouraged by a number of faiths.

The main character cast consists of Dr. Ramzi, a scholar and social activist, and The 99 (youngsters, some of them children) with special abilities conferred to them by "Noor" gemstones. The set of evil characters is led by the power-hungry Rughal, who seeks to steal the power of the Noor stones and their bearers for his personal benefit. The storyline pits The 99 led by Dr. Ramzi in their pursuit of social justice and peace against the forces of chaos and evil.

== Creation ==
The series was created by Naif Al-Mutawa, founder and C.E.O. of Teshkeel Media Group. The initial creative team for The 99 was composed of comic book industry veterans such as Fabian Nicieza, Stuart Moore, June Brigman, Dan Panosian, John McCrea, Ron Wagner, Sean Parsons and Monica Kubina.

The 99 was first launched in Kuwait in 2006 after it received approval from the country’s Ministry of Information, following which it was released globally. In September 2006, Unicorn Investment Bank acquired a stake in Teshkeel Media Group. Since the bank has a Sharia board, the investment enabled The 99 to gain approval in Saudi Arabia with its Sharia compliance.

== Publication history ==
An Origins Preview was first published in the Middle East in May 2006, followed by a US reprinting in July 2007. The 99 #1 was printed in September 2006 in the Middle East and was published in the US in August 2007 as First Light. The 99 only ran five issues in printed form, but both Middle East and USA editions continued to be published electronically until September 2013, with the final issue being #35. Indonesian and Indian editions were also produced.

A 6-issue crossover mini-series JLA/The 99 with the Justice League and The 99 began publication in October 2010.

In total, there were 35 numbered issues, 6 unnumbered special issues. and the 6-issue crossover miniseries.

In 2011, a webstore for the sale of English and Arabic digital editions of The 99 was launched on comiXology, which is currently active.

== Premise ==
=== The Noor gemstones ===
During the siege of Baghdad in 1258, books from the House of Wisdom were tossed into the Tigris river by the Ilkhanate Mongol forces and allied troops to use them as a bridge. Downstream, scholars dipped ninety-nine gemstones into the water to absorb the wisdom and power from the books.

=== Characters ===
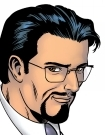
Doctor Ramzi Razem

The 99 are ordinary teenagers and adults from across the globe, who come into possession of one of the ninety-nine magical mystical Noor Stones (Ahjar Al-Noor, Stones of Light) and find themselves empowered in a specific manner. All dilemmas faced by The 99 are overcome through the combined powers and capabilities of three or more members. Through this, The 99 series aims to promote values such as cooperation and unity throughout the Islamic world. Although the series is not religious, it aims to communicate Islamic virtues which are, as viewed by series creator Dr. Al-Mutawa, universal in nature.

The concept of The 99 is based on the ninety-nine attributes (or names) of Allah. Many of these names refer to characteristics that can be possessed by human individuals. For example, generosity, strength, faithfulness, wisdom are all virtues encouraged by a number of faiths.

In compliance with Islamic tradition, the Arabic version of the aliases of each of The 99 is written without the definite article "Al-", because use of this precise form is exclusive to Allah. This serves to remind that The 99 are only mortals, and sets them as human role models, with their qualities and weaknesses.

One of the characters, Batina The Hidden, wears a burqa, which some reports highlighted.

==== The 99 ====
- Bari the Healer (Haroun Ahrens from South Africa) with the ability to heal the wounded
- Batina The Hidden (Rola Hadramy from Yemen) with the ability to blend into the background and become invisible
- Mujiba The Responder (Sharifa Samsudin from Malaysia) with the ability to access the collective wisdom of mankind
- Wassi the Vast (Ashok Mohan from India) with the ability to temporarily enlarge or elongate isolated parts of his body
- Samda the Invulnerable (Aisha Mokhtar from Libya) with the ability to create a protective force field
- Hadya the Guide (Amira Khan from Pakistan living in London, England) with the ability to track people and objects back along the paths they have taken
- Fattah the Opener (Toro Ridwan from Indonesia) with the ability to open up portals to far-away places and by stepping through them instantly go anywhere he wants
- Darr the Afflicter (John Weller from the United States) with the ability to cause physical pain by focusing his anger on people
- Mumita the Destroyer (Catarina Barbosa from Portugal) with the ability to destroy objects
- Jami the Assembler (Miklos Szekelyhidi from Hungary) with the ability to understand how all machines and gadgets work
- Noora the Light (Dana Ibrahim from United Arab Emirates) with the ability to see the light of truth in others or produce illusions of light
- Jabbar the Powerful (Nawaf Al-Bilali from Saudi Arabia) with the ability to move or break through large objects

==== Villains ====
- Rughal, over 500 years old, was the youngest of the Guardians of the Fortress of Knowledge in the 15th Century. Desperate to find the Noor Stones, he becomes the adversary of Dr. Ramzi and The 99.
- Sphinx, an excellent martial artist and with the ability to make nightmares and fears appear to come true
- Professor Mindo, a quick-minded genius and once a leader in nanotechnology
- Red Shroud (James Higgins from United Kingdom), Rughal's driver, bodyguard and general assistant
- Blackwolf (Thiab Al-Daham from Egypt), Rughal's henchman and with the ability to transform into smoke and pass through solid objects. He is also impervious to harm.
- The Pathologist (Audric Blondel from France), enlisted by Rughal. A genius of biology and anatomy. He invented new unorthodox medical instruments and found a way to graft these onto his body giving him precise control over them.
- Hammerforce (Guenther Gerhardt from Germany), A former prizefighter in Thiab’s underground fight club in Cairo. Guenther submitted to Thiab's experimental performance-enhancing drugs, despite some terrible side effects.
- The Murk (Mikhael Murkovsky from Russia), a brilliant scientist who worked with Rughal and with the ability to, like Blackwolf, turn his form gaseous at will.

== In other media ==
- The 99 Village theme park opened in Jahra, Kuwait in March 2009.
- An animated series, The 99, was produced and Teshkeel Comics signed a multimillion-dollar deal with Endemol to produce the series. The series was later banned by Kuwait. The series aired in nearly 70 countries, including on ATV in Turkey, Cartoon Network in Asia and South East Asia, RTE in Ireland, ABC in Australia and Yahoo! Maktoob’s video-on-demand platform and MBC in the MENA region. The series launched on Netflix in December 2012.
- The interactive website the99kids.com was designed by Aardman.
- Creator Naif Al-Mutawa and The 99 were the subjects of the 60 minute long PBS documentary Wham! Bam! Islam! by Isaac Solotaroff broadcast in October 2011 as the season premiere of PBS's series "Independent Lens".
- Al-Mutawa and The 99 were featured in Manislam, a 2014 documentary directed by Nefise Özkal Lorentzen exploring the burden of manhood in Islamic cultures.

== Critical reception and reviews ==
General

The 99 was listed by Forbes as one of the 'Top 20 Trends Sweeping the Globe' in January 2008. In April 2010, in reference to the subject of his prior speech in Cairo titled "A New Beginning", former US President Barack Obama mentioned Dr. Naif Al-Mutawa at the Presidential Summit on Entrepreneurship in Washington, referring to The 99 as "perhaps the most innovative response", and that "his comic books have captured the imagination of so many young people with superheroes who embody the teachings and tolerance of Islam". The 99 has been covered by international media outlets including The New York Times, CNN, Newsweek, BBC, and The Washington Post.

Controversies

In a religious decree carried by Saudi websites, the clerics ruled the series blasphemous because the superheroes of its title are based on the 99 attributes ascribed to Allah in the Quran. The Grand Mufti Abdulaziz al-Sheikh, head of the Permanent Committee for Islamic Research and Issuing Fatwas, said "The 99 is a work of the devil that should be condemned and forbidden in respect to Allah's names and attributes." The original comic strip version, first released in 2006, had already run into opposition from Muslims not only in Saudi Arabia but also in neighboring Kuwait.

The fatwa arose when Al-Mutawa was sued by a Kuwaiti civilian for blasphemy in a court of law in Kuwait in 2014. Al-Mutawa fought the case and won. There was an appeal in 2015 which he won as well.

Andrea Peyser, columnist at the New York Post, wrote in October 2010: "Hide your face and grab the kids. Coming soon to a TV in your child's bedroom is a posse of righteous, Sharia-compliant Muslim superheroes, including one who fights crime hidden head-to-toe by a burqa."

On July 2, 2014, The Kuwait Times reported that ISIL members had issued death threats and offered unspecified rewards for the assassination of Dr. Al-Mutawa, via Twitter. Al-Mutawa defended the work saying that he had received clearance from sharia scholars and never would have gone ahead with the project had he not.

== Awards and accolades ==
- In April 2009, The 99 was honored at the United Nations Alliance of Civilizations “Marketplace of Ideas”.
- Al-Mutawa was awarded “The Schwab Foundation for Social Entrepreneurship Award” for The 99 at the World Economic Forum in May 2009.
- In July 2009, The 99 received the Eliot-Pearson Award for Excellence in Children’s Media from Tufts University.
- In January 2015, Al-Mutawa was presented with the 2014 Islamic Economy Award in the Media Category for Teshkeel Media Group and The 99 from Sheikh Mohammed Bin Rashid Al Maktoum.
- Al-Mutawa has been listed by the Royal Islamic Strategic Studies Center as one of ‘The 500 Most Influential Muslims’ for his creation of The 99, every year since 2009 to 2018.
