= Stuart Moore =

American writer and editor of comic books and novels

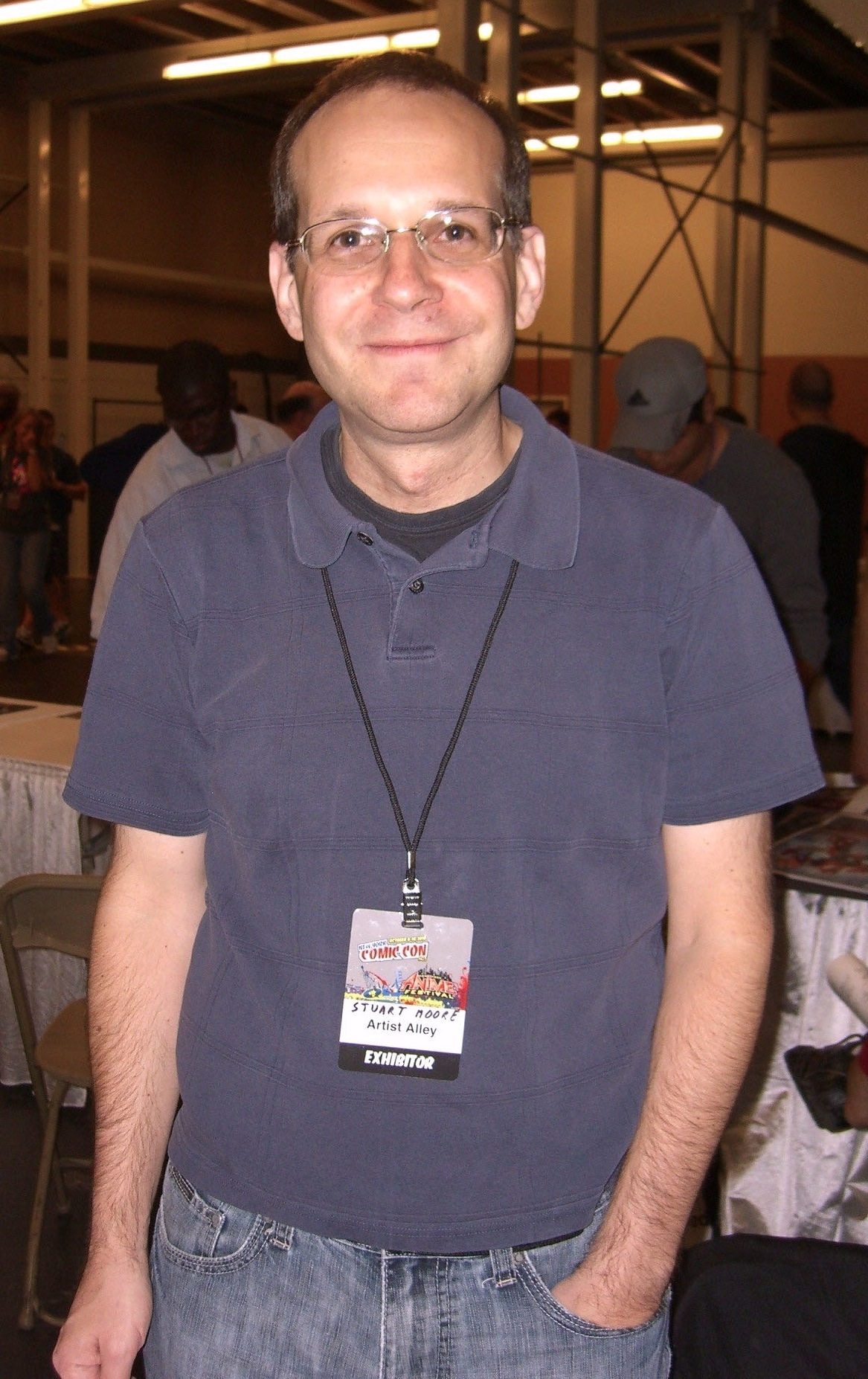
- Moore at the New York Comic Con in Manhattan, October 10, 2010
- Area: Writer
- Notable works: Firestorm

Stuart Moore is an American writer and editor of comic books and novels.

== Career ==
Stuart Moore's writing includes Civil War, the first in a line of prose novels from Marvel Comics, and two stories for Amazon's Kindle Worlds program: X-O Manowar: Noughts and Crosses and Shadowman: Sunshine and Shadow. Other prose novels include American Meat, Reality Bites, and John Carter: The Movie Novelization.

His comics and graphic novel work includes the original science-fiction series Earthlight, Shadrach Stone, and PARA; Web of Spider-Man, Namor: The First Mutant, and Wolverine Noir (Marvel); Firestorm and Detective Comics (DC Comics); the multicultural superhero team The 99; the comics adaptation of the bestselling novel Redwall; assorted Star Trek, Transformers, and Stargate projects; and two volumes of the award-winning The Nightmare Factory.

Moore is also a freelance editor and partner at Botfriend, a graphic novel packaging company. He has worked as a book editor at St. Martin’s Press, publishing a wide variety of science fiction and pop culture books. More recently, he has served as editor of the Virgin Comics / SciFi Channel comics line and the Marvel Knights imprint. At DC Comics, Moore was a founding editor of the Vertigo Comics imprint, where he won the Will Eisner Award for Best Editor in 1996 and the Don Thompson Award for Favorite Editor in 1999.

== Bibliography ==
=== Comics ===
- Para (Penny-Farthing Press)
- Zendra (Penny-Farthing Press)
- Lone (with Jerome Opena, Dark Horse Comics/Rocket Comics, 6-issue mini-series, tpb, 152 pages, 2004, ISBN 1-59307-265-1)
- Giant Robot Warriors (with Ryan Kelly, AiT/Planet Lar, tpb, 120 pages, 2004, ISBN 1-932051-19-8)
- "Escapist 2966" (with Steve Conley, in Michael Chabon Presents: The Amazing Adventures of the Escapist #4, Dark Horse, 80 pages, 2004, ISBN 1-59307-167-1, collected in Michael Chabon Presents: The Amazing Adventures of the Escapist Vol. 2, 160 pages, 2004, ISBN 1-59307-172-8)
- Justice League Adventures (DC Comics)
- "Pieces De Rechange (Spare Parts)" (with Cully Hamner, in Metal Hurlant magazine anthology, 2005)
- "Other Folks' Troubles" (with Jason Copland in Western Tales of Terror anthology, 2005)
- Firestorm #14–32 (with Jamal Igle, Keith Champagne, and Rob Stull, DC Comics)
- "Wolverine: The Healing" (with C. P. Smith, in X-Men Unlimited #12, Marvel Comics, 2006)
- "Wolverine: The Package" (with C. P. Smith, in Wolverine #41, Marvel Comics, 2006)
- Earthlight (with Christopher Schons, two volumes, Tokyopop, volume 1, 195 pages, October 2006, ISBN 1-59816-705-7)
- Stargate Atlantis: Wraithfall (with Mauricio Melo, Avatar Press, 2006)
- JSA Classified #10–13 (with Paul Gulacy and Jimmy Palmiotti, DC Comics, 2006)
- Legion of Superheroes (various stories, DC Comics, 2006)
- Punisher X-Mas Special (with C. P. Smith, Marvel Comics, 2006)
- "Tic Tac Bang Bang" (with Michael Gaydos, in Postcards anthology, Villard, 2007)
- Redwall (adapted from the novel by Brian Jacques, art by Bret Blevins, Philomel, 2007)
- "Batman: The Siege" (with Andy Clarke, in Detective Comics #829–830, DC Comics, 2007)
- The Nightmare Factory (adapted from the works of Thomas Ligotti, two volumes, HarperCollins/Fox Atomic Comics, 2007–2008)
- "Spider-Man: Unfriendly Neighborhood" (with Clayton Henry and Mark Morales, in Marvel Comics Presents #1, Marvel Comics, 2006)
- New Avengers U.S. Military special editions #4–6 (Marvel Comics, 2006–2008)
- "Stardust: A Death of Hope" with Mike McKone, in Annihilation: Heralds of Galactus, 2007 (Marvel Comics)
- Ghost Rider Annual #1 (with Ben Oliver, Marvel Comics, 2007)
- The 99 (Teshkeel Media, 2007–2013)
- New Avengers/Transformers (with Tyler Kirkham, 2007, Marvel Comics)
- Transformers Spotlight: Ramjet (with Robby Musso, IDW Publishing, 2007)
- "Termite Blues" (with Alberto Ponticelli, in Creature Features #2, Th3rd Eye Studios, 2008)
- Spider-Man: Fear Itself (with Joe Suitor, Marvel Comics, 2009)
- Wolverine Noir (with C. P. Smith, Marvel Comics, 2009)
- Star Trek Alien Spotlight: Tribbles (IDW, 2009)
- Wolverine: Under the Boardwalk (Marvel, 2010)
- The Golden Age Deadpool in Captain America: Who Won't Wear the Shield? (Marvel, 2010)
- Spider-Man: Back in Quack (with Howard the Duck) (Marvel, 2010)
- Cloak and Dagger (Marvel, 2010)
- X-Men Origins: Cyclops (Marvel, 2010)
- Deadpool Team-Up #896 (Marvel, 2010)
- Star Trek Captain's Log: Pike (IDW, 2010)
- Namor: The First Mutant (Marvel, 2010 – 2011)
- Conan: The Mask of Acheron (Dark Horse, 2011)
- Wolverine/Deadpool: The Decoy (Marvel, 2011)
- JLA/THE 99 (DC/Teshkeel, 2010–2011)
- Shells in X-Men: To Serve and Protect (Marvel, 2011)
- Web of Spider-Man (Marvel, 2012)

=== Novels ===
- Civil War: A Novel of the Marvel Universe (Marvel Entertainment, 2012)
- John Carter: The Movie Novelization (Disney Editions, 2012)
- Black Flame's Dark Future series:
  - American Meat (October 2005, ISBN 1-84416-299-0)
  - Reality Bites: In the Jungle No-one Can Hear You Scream (October 2006, ISBN 1-84416-408-X)
  - "Zodiac legacy:Convergence"[The Zodiac Legacy series] (Published January 27, 2015)(2016 Disney Enterprise, Inc)
  - "Zodiac Legacy: the Dragon's Return"[The Zodiac Legacy series] (Published January 26, 2016)(2016 Disney Enterprise, Inc)
  - "Zodiac Legacy:the Age of Bronze"[the Zodiac Legacy series]
- Thanos: Death Sentence (Marvel Comics, 2017)

Preceded by Daniel Way	Wolverine writer 2006	Succeeded by Marc Guggenheim
