= R. Eric Lieb =

American writer

R. Eric Lieb is an American writer currently working at Skydance / Skydance Interactive / Paramount Games.

== Career history ==
Lieb has held positions at Artisan Entertainment and Lionsgate where he worked on such films as the Academy Award-winning Crash, as well as The Punisher, Saw, Saw II, The Devil's Rejects, and Hostel. While at Lionsgate he pioneered the motion comic trend by spearheading an animated version of the Saw: Rebirth comic book, for which he also wrote the story.

He was the Director of Development for Fox Atomic, the youth-market film studio. Theatrical releases from the studio included 28 Weeks Later, Jennifer's Body, and I Love You Beth Cooper. At Fox Atomic, Lieb created Fox Atomic Comics and was Editor in Chief of the division.

Lieb was a founding partner of Blacklight Transmedia with Zak Kadison, Mark Long and Joanna Alexander, under a first-look deal with Imagine Entertainment. At Blacklight, Lieb focused on the creation and development of all film, video game, television, comic book and new media franchises.

He was formerly the Lead Writer on The Callisto Protocol.

== Education ==
Lieb graduated in 2001 with a BA from the University of Southern California School of Cinema-Television.
