= 28 Weeks Later =

2007 film by Juan Carlos Fresnadillo

- Theatrical release poster
- Directed by: Juan Carlos Fresnadillo
- Screenplay by: Rowan Joffé; Juan Carlos Fresnadillo; E. L. Lavigne; Jesús Olmo
- Produced by: Enrique López Lavigne; Andrew Macdonald; Allon Reich
- Starring: Robert Carlyle; Rose Byrne; Jeremy Renner; Harold Perrineau; Catherine McCormack; Mackintosh Muggleton; Imogen Poots; Idris Elba
- Cinematography: Enrique Chediak
- Edited by: Chris Gill
- Music by: John Murphy
- Production companies: Fox Atomic; DNA Films; Figment Films; Sogecine; Koan Films
- Distributed by: 20th Century Fox (United Kingdom); Fox Atomic (United States)
- Release dates: April 26, 2007 (London); May 11, 2007 (United Kingdom/United States); June 29, 2007 (Spain)
- Running time: 99 minutes
- Countries: United Kingdom; United States; Spain
- Language: English
- Budget: $15 million
- Box office: $72.3 million

28 Weeks Later is a 2007 action horror film directed by Juan Carlos Fresnadillo, who co-wrote it with Rowan Joffé, Enrique López Lavigne, and Jesús Olmo. It is a standalone sequel to 28 Days Later (2002) and the second instalment in its series. The film stars Robert Carlyle, Rose Byrne, Jeremy Renner, Harold Perrineau, Catherine McCormack, Mackintosh Muggleton, Imogen Poots, and Idris Elba. Set seven months after the earlier Rage Virus outbreak, it follows the US-led NATO forces' attempt to establish a safe zone in London, the consequences of two young siblings breaking protocol, and the virus's reintroduction into Britain.

On a $15 million budget, principal photography began in August 2006 and ran for ten weeks. Danny Boyle and Alex Garland returned as executive producers, and Boyle also contributed second-unit footage that includes parts of the opening sequence. Promotion included the release of a graphic novel tie-in and a projected biohazard warning staged on the White Cliffs of Dover ahead of the film's general release.

The film was released theatrically on 11 May 2007 and is a co-production involving the United Kingdom, United States, and Spain, with distribution handled by 20th Century Fox in all countries via Fox Atomic . It earned $72.3 million worldwide and generally positive reviews from critics, who largely praised it as a tense, well-crafted militarised disaster horror with a standout opening and set pieces, while noting uneven originality, clarity, and plausibility compared with its predecessor. Commentators also noted satirical critique of American militarised crisis management, particularly the Bush administration's 2003 invasion of Iraq. Major plot elements in the film have been recontextualised in the third instalment, 28 Years Later, released in 2025.

== Plot ==
During the initial Rage Virus outbreak in Britain, (Note: As depicted in 28 Days Later (2002)) Don, his wife Alice, and four other survivors shelter in a cottage outside London. They hear a boy screaming and allow him inside, only to discover that a horde of Infected has followed him. As the Infected invade the cottage and kill the other survivors, Don urges Alice to leave the boy, but she refuses and is cornered by the Infected. Don flees and leaves on a boat.

Twenty-eight weeks later, many Infected have died of starvation. US-led NATO forces bring settlers into a protected zone in London. Don and Alice's two children, Tammy and Andy, arrive among the settlers and are housed on District One, a heavily guarded safe zone on the Isle of Dogs. Tammy and Andy sneak out at dawn to their former home to retrieve family photographs and find Alice alive but ill. American soldiers capture the siblings and take them and Alice to an isolation unit, where the medical officer, Scarlet, discovers that Alice is an asymptomatic carrier of the disease. Don, consumed with guilt, visits Alice, kisses her, becomes infected, and kills her.

As the newly infected Don goes on a rampage and spreads the virus, Scarlet concludes that the siblings' genetic makeup may be important for developing a cure or vaccine and helps them escape. With infected and uninfected people becoming difficult to distinguish in darkness, American troops are ordered to kill everyone. Doyle, a sniper, refuses to carry out the order and escapes with Scarlet and the siblings as the US Air Force firebombs parts of London in an attempt to stop the spread.

The group waits for a helicopter extraction arranged by Doyle's friend, Flynn, but Flynn insists on taking only Doyle. Doyle refuses to abandon the others, and they head toward Wembley Stadium, where uninfected civilians have been ordered to assemble. They hide in a car as soldiers with flamethrowers arrive, intending to kill anyone who might be infected. When the car will not start, Doyle attempts to push-start it and is burned alive. In the confusion, Scarlet, Tammy, and Andy escape into a dark London Underground station. There, Don appears, kills Scarlet, and bites Andy. Tammy kills her father, but Andy becomes an asymptomatic carrier of the disease. Flynn finds the siblings and flies them to France.

Twenty-eight days later, a voice on the helicopter radio, speaking with a French accent, requests help. The final shot then shows a horde of Infected emerging from the Paris Métro and attacking Paris.

== Cast ==
- Robert Carlyle as Don Harris, Tammy and Andy's father
- Rose Byrne as Major Scarlet Levy, a US medical officer
- Jeremy Renner as Sergeant Doyle, a Delta Force sniper
- Harold Perrineau as Flynn, a military helicopter pilot
- Imogen Poots as Tammy Harris, Don and Alice's daughter
- Mackintosh Muggleton as Andy Harris, Don and Alice's son
- Catherine McCormack as Alice Harris, Tammy and Andy's mother
- Idris Elba as Brigadier General Stone, a US general overseeing District One

== Production ==
=== Development ===
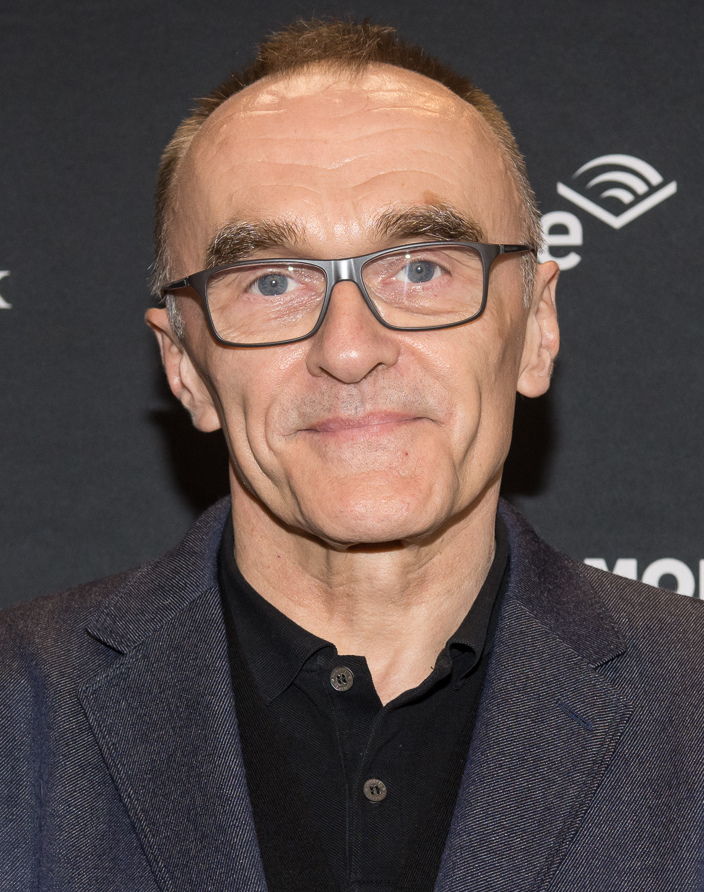
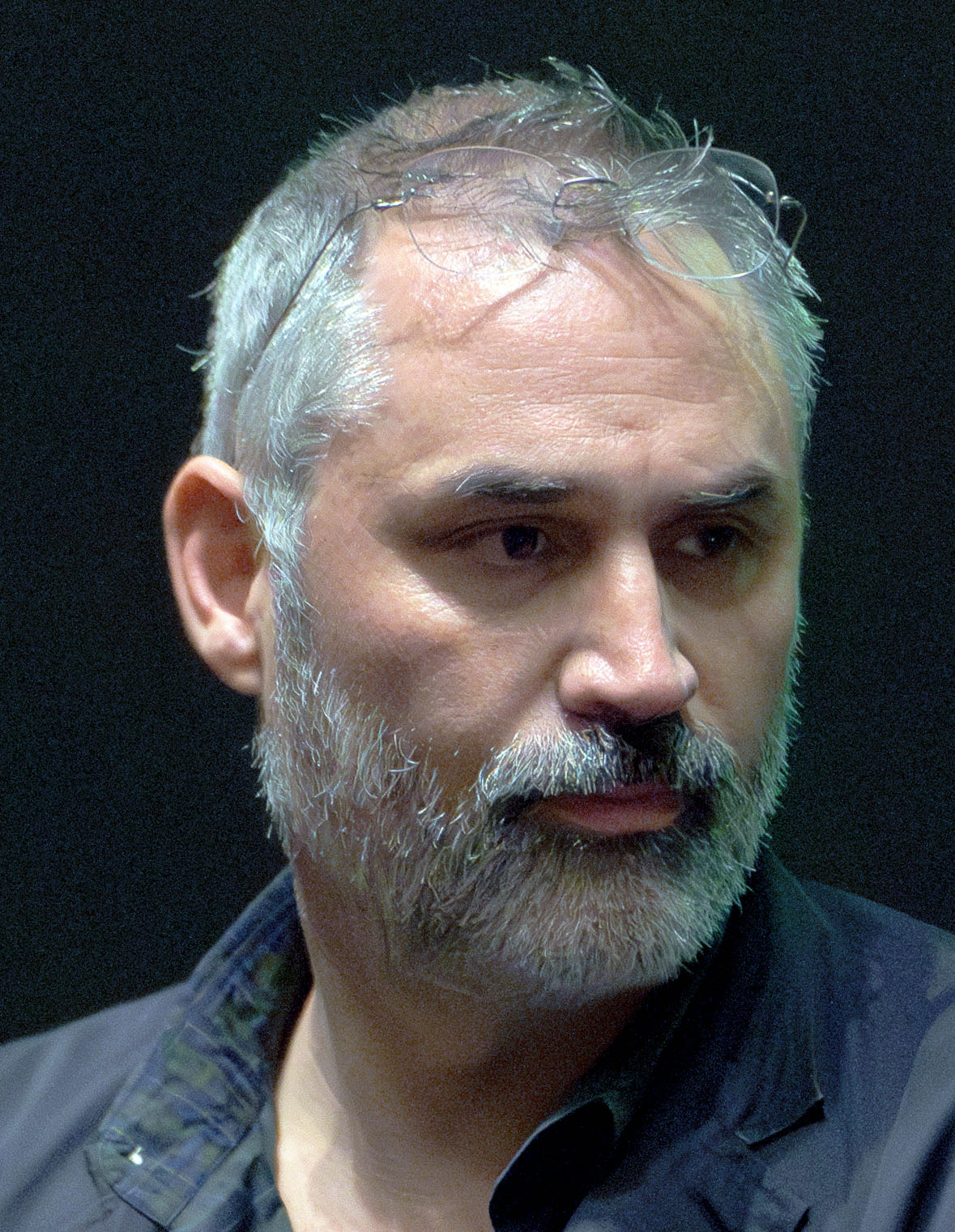
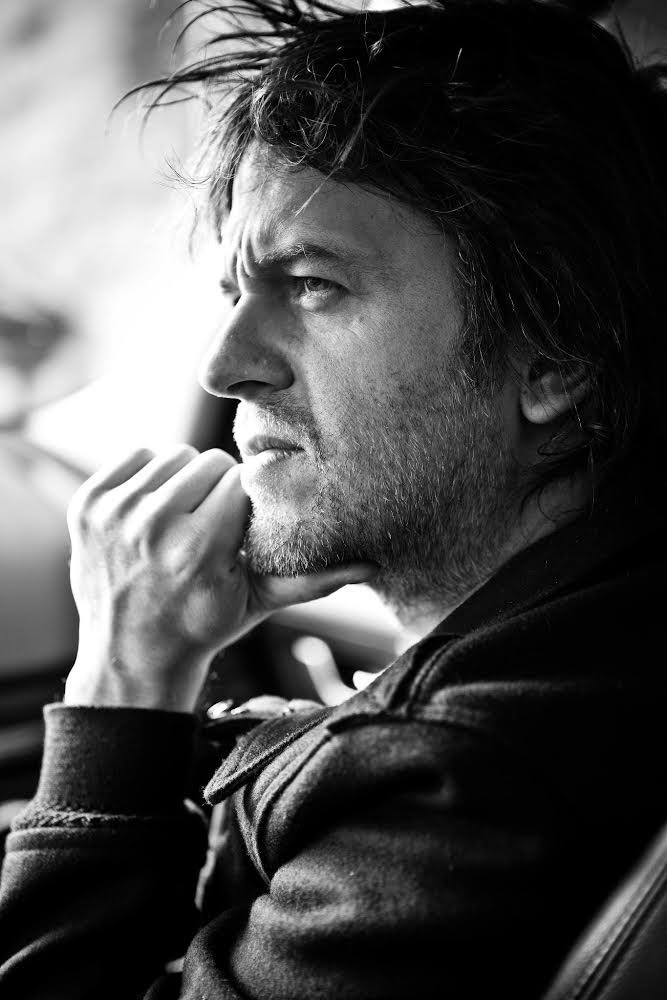
28 Days Later director Danny Boyle (left) and screenwriter Alex Garland (center) returned as executive producers on 28 Weeks Later, Juan Carlos Fresnadillo (right) was director.

Following the international success of 28 Days Later (2002), the filmmakers began exploring a sequel and focused on a scenario set after the Rage Virus outbreak had been contained. The producers described the core question as what would happen once the disease had been eradicated and the quarantine lifted, including who would coordinate returning residents and how survivors would re-enter public life.

Rowan Joffé was hired to produce a first screenplay draft, after which the filmmakers began searching for a director who could extend the series without replicating the first film's perspective on London. They stated that bringing in a director from outside the United Kingdom was intended to provide a new visual approach to the city.

Danny Boyle cited Juan Carlos Fresnadillo's debut feature Intacto (2001) as a key reason for recommending him, and the producers approached Fresnadillo to direct after producer Andrew Macdonald and screenwriter Alex Garland responded to the film in the same terms. Fresnadillo accepted the invitation after discussions with the producing team, and his long-time producing partner Enrique López-Lavigne joined the project as well.

Fresnadillo and López-Lavigne then worked with Spanish screenwriter Jesús Olmo to develop the screenplay, describing a process that took almost a year and that shaped the sequel around a family and the lasting consequences of earlier choices. Boyle and Garland returned as executive producers, with the production describing Garland as closely involved in story and script work.

=== Pre-production ===
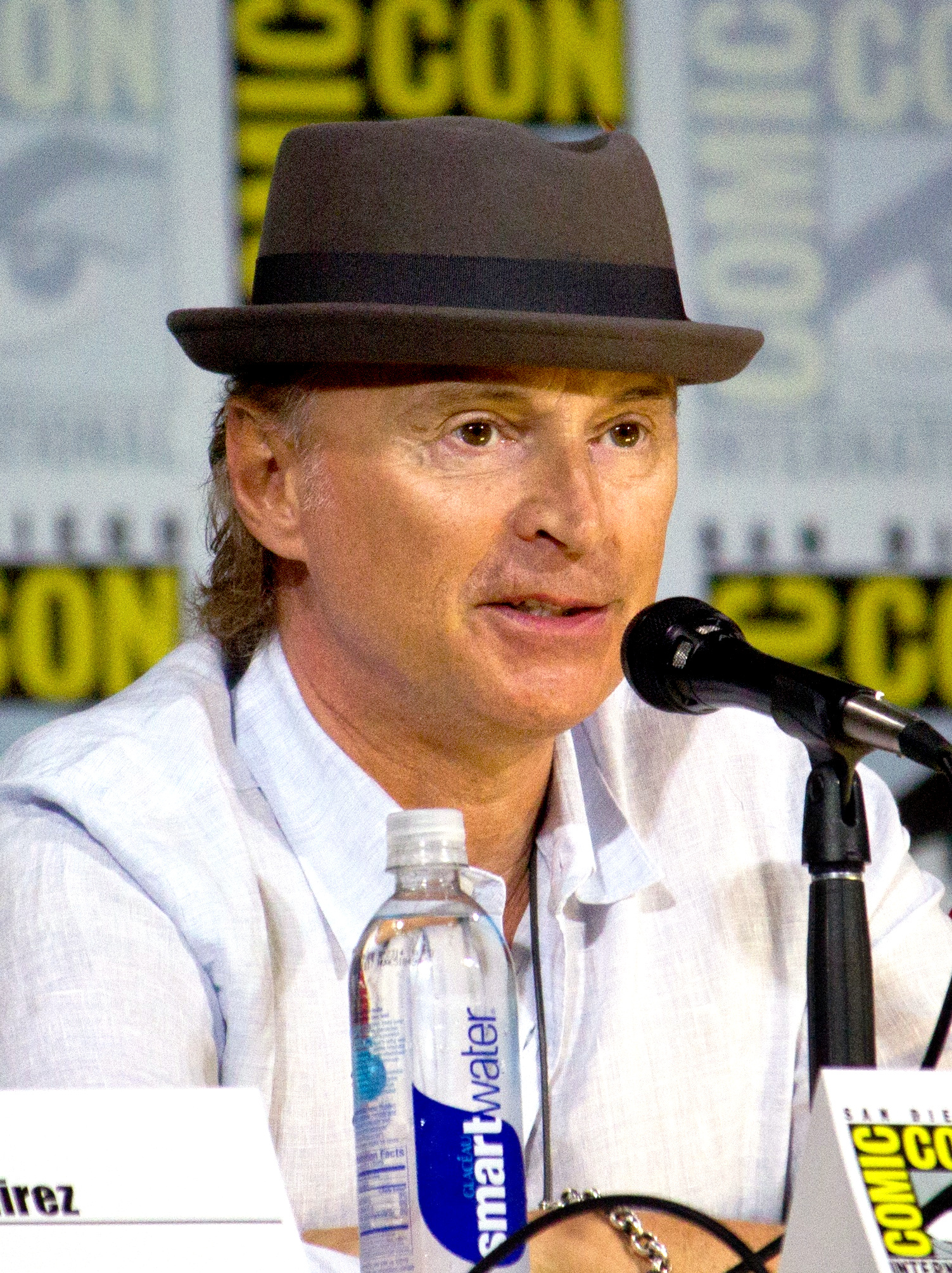
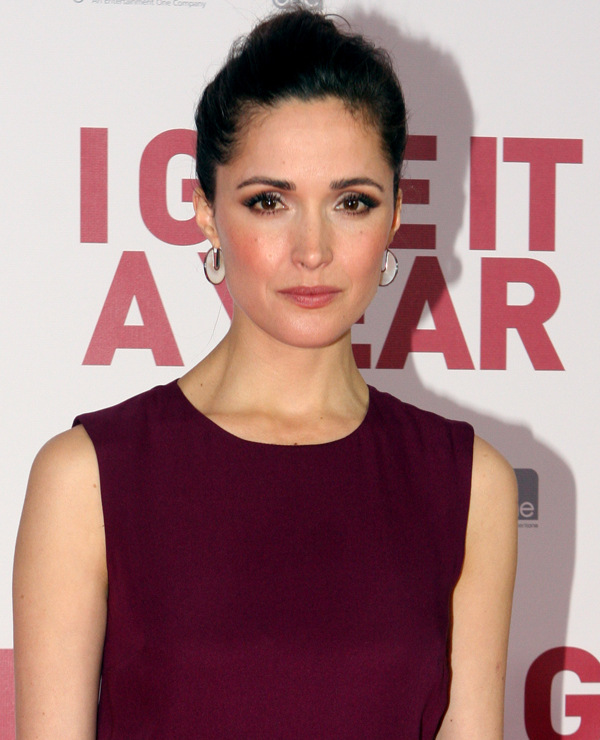
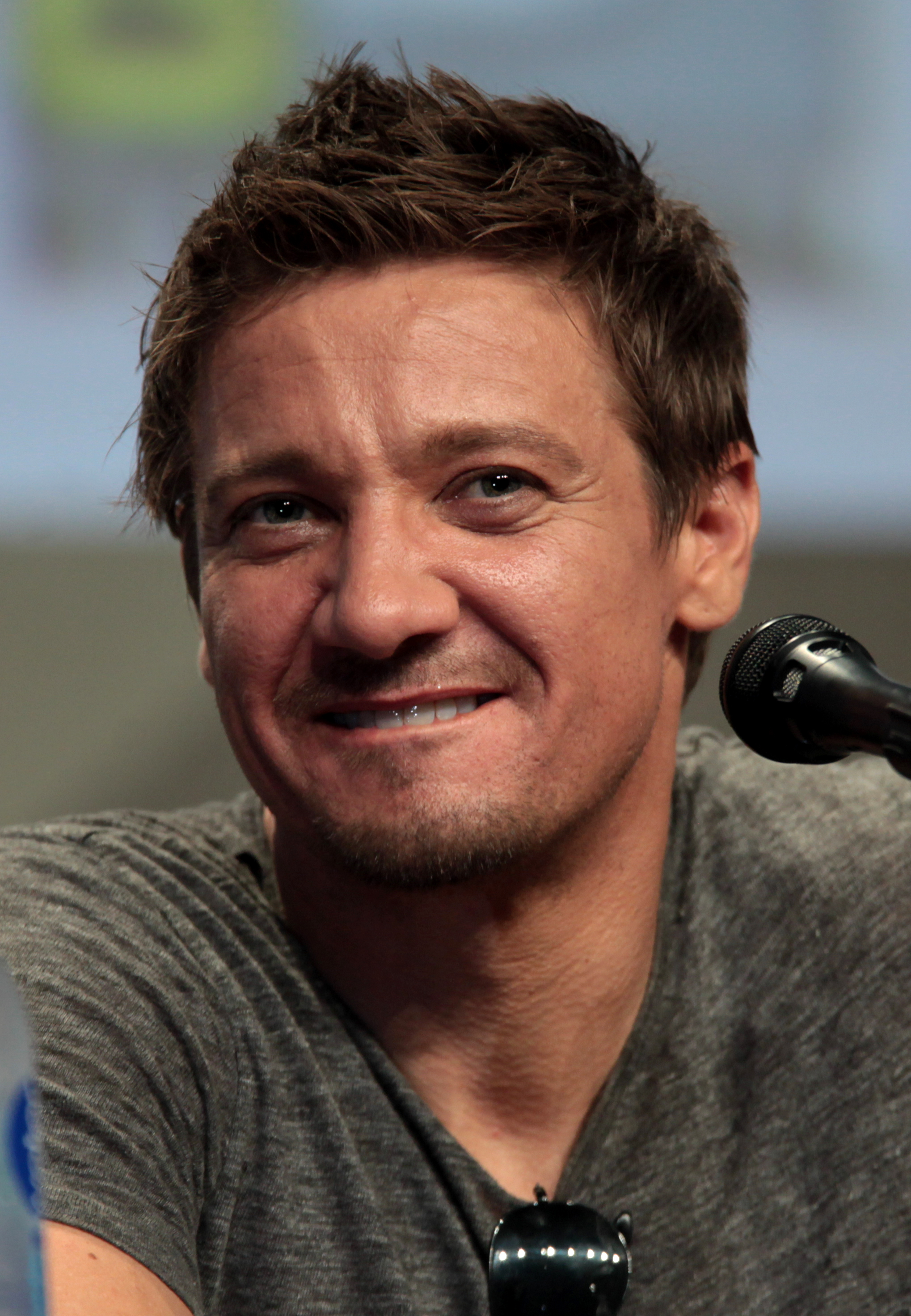
The cast of 28 Weeks Later includes Robert Carlyle, Rose Byrne, and Jeremy Renner.

The production assembled a film crew that included cinematographer Enrique Chediak, production designer Mark Tildesley, costume designer Jane Petrie, make-up designer Konnie Daniel, and editor Chris Gill. (Note: Chris Gill served as the editor of the film, even though editor Masahiro Hirakubo was reportedly involved at one point.)

Casting was organised around a central family. The filmmakers sought to cast actors who could sustain both intimate scenes and large-scale action beats, and they identified Robert Carlyle as someone who could anchor the story and work closely with the younger cast members. Casting director Shaheen Baig expanded the search for child performers beyond conventional drama schools, inviting more than 600 children to workshops before selecting Mackintosh Muggleton. Imogen Poots was cast as Tammy after the filmmakers had auditioned hundreds of actresses, and Rose Byrne joined after earlier work with Boyle and Macdonald on Sunshine (2007).

Because the sequel featured a larger number of infected than the original film, the movement of the infected was treated as a core design element during preparation. Movement specialist Paul Kasey worked with Fresnadillo in pre-production on camera tests aimed at establishing the infected's look and performance style. Kasey then recruited performers with movement-intensive backgrounds, including dance, gymnastics, mime, and circus work, and led workshops to ensure consistent behaviour across the infected group.

=== Filming and post-production ===
Principal photography began in August 2006 and ran for ten weeks. The production was based at 3 Mills Studios in East London and included a week of rehearsal, nine weeks shooting in London, and a week on location in Hertfordshire. Boyle remained involved beyond executive producing, providing casting and crew support and shooting three days of second unit footage, including parts of the opening sequence.

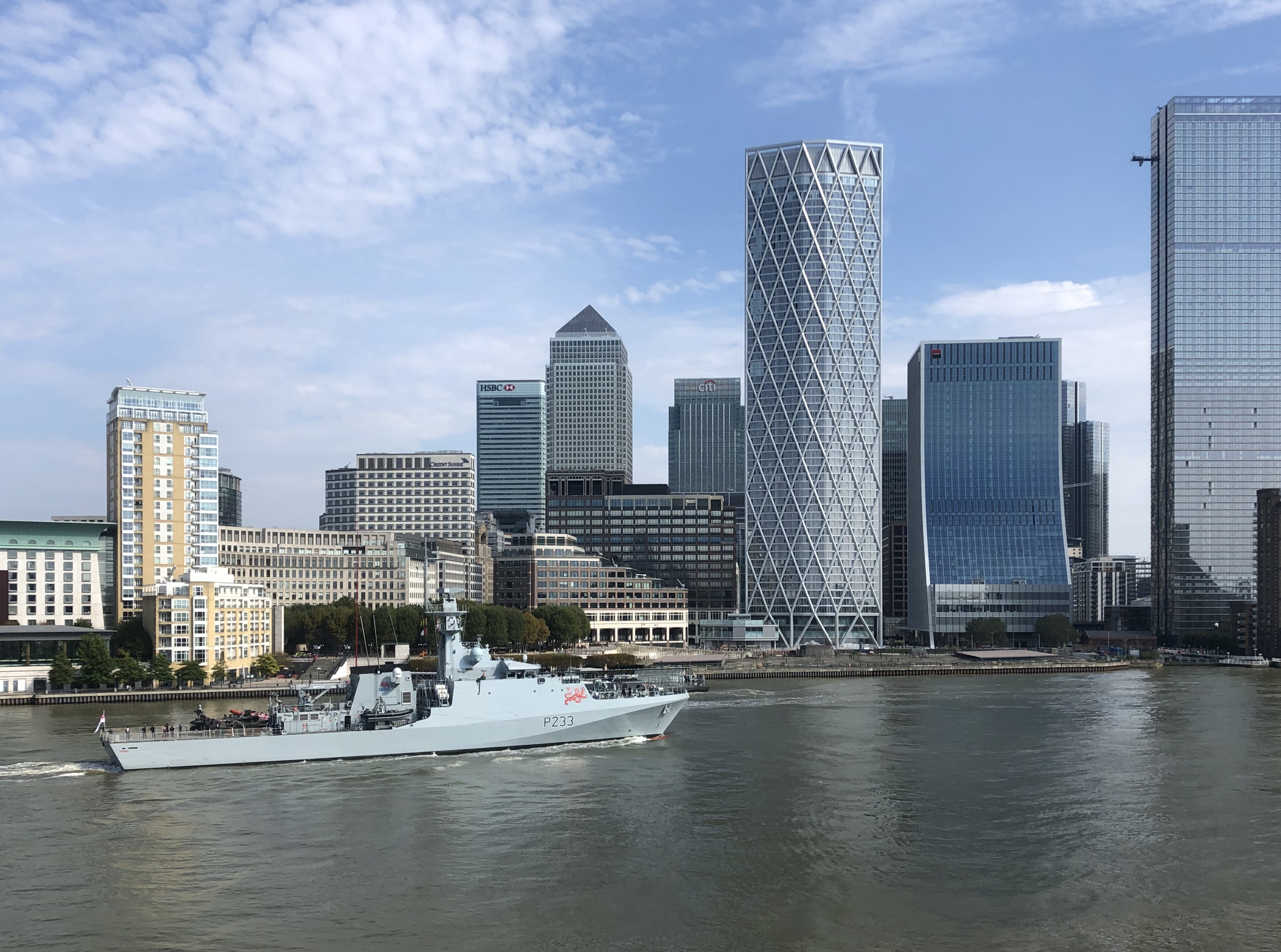
The film's District One setting was filmed in Canary Wharf, pictured here on 16 September 2020.

For the film's military-controlled safe zone, District One, the production secured permission to shoot in Canary Wharf, describing the location as advantageous because it is surrounded by water and connected to City Airport by an elevated rail line that could be framed as secure access within the story. To achieve the earlier film's desolate city imagery, the production filmed sequences in central London early in the morning with the assistance of local authority and police. Other reported locations included Tower Bridge, Trafalgar Square, Shaftesbury Avenue, Regents Park, Millennium Bridge, and Wembley Stadium.

Fresnadillo said he pursued immediacy by shooting in a style he compared to a horror documentary, using handheld work and multiple cameras, and aligning performance and production design choices with that approach. Jeremy Renner described a shooting method that prioritised on-the-spot camera decisions over a rigid shot list. The filmmakers used "day for night" photography for some of the later sequences to help sell a citywide blackout without extensive digital light removal, while still completing hundreds of computer-generated shots on a compressed post-production schedule. The Paris coda was a late addition, devised near the end of production and filmed quickly with a reduced crew using HD cameras.

Carlyle said that infected make-up involved contact lenses and that he spent several days shooting in that state, adding that lens fit could affect comfort during takes. Poots described the make-up process as extensive and visually overwhelming in proximity. Hundreds of visual effects shots were completed within roughly two months.

=== Music ===
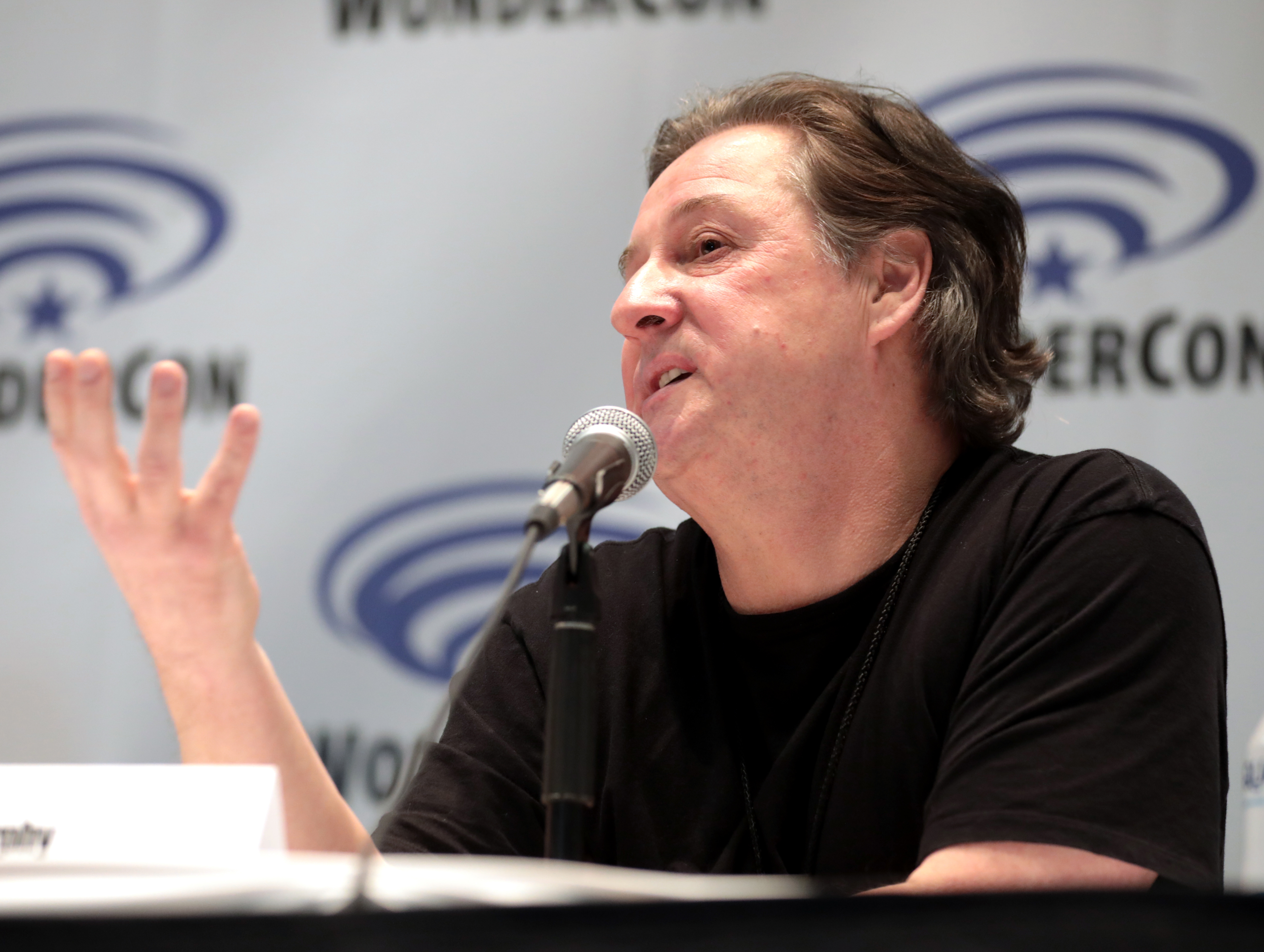
28 Days Later composer John Murphy (pictured at the 2022 WonderCon) returned to score the sequel.

The score for 28 Weeks Later was composed by John Murphy and was recorded at the Czech National Symphony Orchestra (CNSO) in Prague. Murphy said the creative discussions focused less on specific musical instructions and more on the emotions the film should produce. This approach gave him wide freedom to explore ideas that support mood and psychology rather than simply "matching" the action.

In describing his writing process, Murphy said he avoided simply repeating the feeling already provided by the visuals. He experimented with slow, gradual musical "builds" that begin almost invisibly, sometimes as little more than a low, filtered rumble, and he said this helped him create tension while leaving space for dialogue and sound effects. He said the goal was a sound that could feel large and heavy without becoming messy. Murphy also wanted the score to have its own personality, even while staying connected to earlier themes. He originally imagined bringing back the earlier film's main theme, "In the House – In a Heartbeat", later in the sequel, but after seeing it used in the opening, he said it created the right bridge between instalments. He then rearranged that theme so it would work naturally in the sequel's opening sequence. He also described a key cue for a quiet attic scene as mixing horror with grief and relief, and he said its exaggerated intensity led the team to nickname it the "Exorcist Theme".

== Release ==
=== Marketing ===
In July 2006, Fox Atomic Comics in association with publisher HarperCollins promoted the film with the publication, in early 2007, of 28 Days Later: The Aftermath, a graphic novel that bridges the gap between 28 Days Later and 28 Weeks Later. On 13 April 2007, 28 days before the release of the film in UK cinemas, a huge biohazard warning sign was also projected against the White Cliffs of Dover.

=== Box office ===
28 Weeks Later was released theatrically on 11 May 2007, in the United Kingdom by 20th Century Fox, and in the United States by Fox Atomic. It earned $9.8 million in its first weekend while playing in 2,303 theatres, with $3.1 million in the UK, where it surpassed the original's opening weekend gross by 34 per cent. A pre-release commentary on Rotten Tomatoes had projected a start of roughly $13 million, but the actual opening weekend came in below that figure. The film ended its theatrical run grossing $28.6 million in the US and Canada, $43.7 million in other territories, and $72.3 million worldwide.

=== Home media ===
On 9 October 2007, 28 Weeks Later was released on DVD and Blu-ray by 20th Century Fox Home Entertainment. Both releases included supplemental features such as an audio commentary track by director Juan Carlos Fresnadillo and co-writer Enrique López Lavigne, deleted scenes with optional commentary, behind-the-scenes featurettes, and animated shorts.

In a weekly DVD sales report dated 21 October 2007, The Numbers listed 28 Weeks Later among the top five titles for the week, reporting 336,000 units sold and $6.05 million in sales. The same report also cited sales for a two-film DVD pack comprising 28 Weeks Later and 28 Days Later, which sold 65,000 units and earned $1.70 million. In the US, 1.3 million DVD units have been sold, generating a revenue of $25.3 million.

On 2 June 2009, a limited-edition soundtrack of John Murphy's score was released by La-La Land Records, with 1,500 copies shipped. The album was expanded with Murphy's five previously unreleased cues.

== Reception ==
=== Critical response ===
28 Weeks Later was generally well received by critics, though it was seen as lacking the broader cultural influence of 28 Days Later, which is often credited with revitalising the zombie genre and offering a more empathetic portrayal of people confronting a sudden outbreak. Across contemporary reviews, critics tended to frame 28 Weeks Later as a sequel that scales the premise up from intimate survival horror into a militarised disaster narrative, with craft and intensity widely noted even when originality and plausibility were debated. (Note: Attributed to multiple references:) They also repeatedly pointed to the film's creation of terror through camerawork, editing, and sound, the effectiveness of its opening sequence and action staging, and whether its political allegory and sequel mechanics sharpen or blunt what the earlier film achieved. (Note: Attributed to multiple references:)

Critics highlighted the sequel's ability to generate sustained tension through escalation, craft, and visceral set pieces, even when they held reservations about other elements. (Note: Attributed to multiple references:) Michael Gingold of Fangoria presented the film as a rare follow-up that remains "scary and intense" while adopting a bleaker, less compromising tone than its predecessor. Empire's Kim Newman found it a worthy sequel that "extends the story in intelligent, suspenseful ways", even though its American characters are relatively underdeveloped and the helicopter action sequence is not as tense as the US troops' desperate attempts to contain another spread of the virus. Derek Elley for Variety called it a "full-bore zombie romp" that asserts itself immediately through a strong opening sequence and then keeps pressure on through a succession of large-scale action beats. For Ray Bennett, in The Hollywood Reporter, it is "a ferociously entertaining thriller with sympathetic characters, stunning set pieces and pulsating excitement". The New York Times critic A. O. Scott found it "bracingly smart and satisfying", even as he argued that its intensity can lean on aggressive stylistic techniques. A similar sentiment is expressed in the Chicago Tribune review by Michael Phillips, who praised the film's grim imagination and commitment to its bleak vision while acknowledging how punishing the experience is.

Reviewers frequently treated the film's formal style as central to its impact, crediting its restless visuals with creating immediacy while also noting that the same choices could obscure clarity or emotional beats. (Note: Attributed to multiple references:) In The Philadelphia Inquirer, Carrie Rickey singled out the "sprinting camera" and the propulsive score as mechanisms that keep the audience physically keyed up, even suggesting the cinematography benefits from not lingering too long on gore. By contrast, Erin Meister, writing for The Boston Globe, praised director Juan Carlos Fresnadillo's use of darkness and shadow but cautioned that the shaky camera can become "nausea-inducing", particularly in quieter dramatic passages. Phillips similarly admired the handheld urgency while warning that some violence is staged and cut in ways that risk "visual unintelligibility". And the BBC review, by Paul Arendt, called the sequel's "grimy, digital-video feel that's enhanced by delirious editing and a mind-boggling excess of gore" an effective genre mimicry of the template set by the earlier film.

A recurring structural judgement was that the film begins with unusually controlled suspense but shifts into a more conventional, and sometimes less convincing, escalation once the military response takes over. (Note: Attributed to multiple references:) In The Times, James Christopher praised the opening sequence for generating dread through understatement and carefully calibrated tension, then argued that later sections collapse into a thinner narrative, memorably likening its mid-to-late action to a videogame scenario and calling the plot "porridge". The Baltimore Sun critic Chris Kaltenbach took a related view: he found the film undeniably exciting and fast-paced, but he faulted it for lack of logic and for relying on a "steady stream of violence and carnage" in place of the earlier film's ingenuity and restraint. Although Arendt recommended the film as a brisk horror ride, he said it "feels a tad redundant" to the original, as it did not set out to improve what Boyle could have done better.

Several critics read an overt layer of political commentary into the scenario of a US-led, security-heavy repopulation of London, though they disagreed about whether that satire felt sharp, subtle, or stale. (Note: Attributed to multiple references:) Scott described the film as savagely satirising the war on terror, tying its horror mechanics to contemporary geopolitics. Rickey made that subtext explicit, calling the film a political allegory of an American military occupation and pointing to its parallels with the Iraq War. Phillips argued that regardless of whether its plot had a "strong anti-American streak" or an "anti-Bush streak" in light of "everything from present-day Iraq to the aftermath of Hurricane Katrina", the film just let the atmosphere and outcomes imply the critique. Christopher, by contrast, treated the topical ambition as a missed opportunity, suggesting that whatever satire might have seemed pointed on the surface now plays crude, and that the "dig" at trigger-happy occupiers adds little illumination. Meister characterised the commentary as "subtle but unmistakable", describing the troops less as villains than as frightened and desperate agents of harsh policy.

=== Retrospective assessments ===
On the review aggregator website Rotten Tomatoes, 73% of 200 critics' reviews are positive. The website's consensus reads: "While 28 Weeks Later lacks the humanism that made 28 Days Later a classic, it's made up with fantastic atmosphere and punchy direction." Even so, it is the lowest-rated instalment in the 28 Days Later series ranked by Tomatometer, as of 2026. Metacritic, which uses a weighted average, assigned the film a score of 78 out of 100, based on 34 critics, indicating "generally favorable" reviews.

The film won Best Horror at the 2008 Empire Awards. It has also made lists of the top zombie films by Rotten Tomatoes (no. 53), Paste (no. 39), and Screen Rant (no. 12), as well as the best movie opening scenes—horror or otherwise—by Rotten Tomatoes (no. 15), ComicBook.com (no. 2), and GQ (no. 4). Den of Geek places the film at no. 9 on its list of the best horror movie sequels.

In a 2025 interview with GQ, Garland treated his experience with 28 Weeks Later as an early lesson in the common industry expectation that a profitable success should be followed up quickly, regardless of whether the continuation emerges from the same creative impulse as the original.

== Themes ==
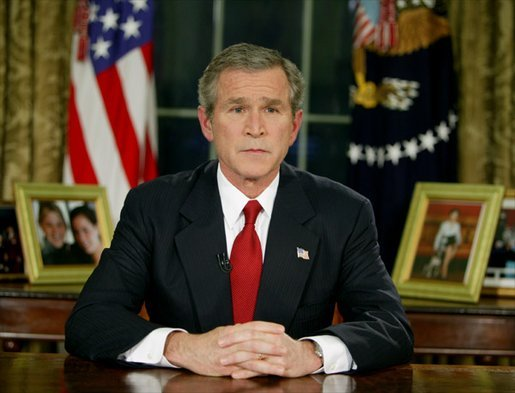
Critics note that 28 Weeks Later draws on "Mission Accomplished" symbolism and satirises militarised crisis management of the Bush administration's invasion of Iraq. Pictured here is US President George W. Bush announcing Operation Iraqi Freedom at the Oval Office in 2003.

In the book Diseased Cinema: Plagues, Pandemics and Zombies in American Movies (2024), authors Robert Alpert, Merle Eisenberg, and Lee Mordechai characterise 28 Weeks Later as an example of a broader shift toward a more pessimistic view of infectious disease narratives. Rather than centering on a contained crisis that can be managed, the film emphasises on how quickly an outbreak can re-emerge during reconstruction, and how fragile efforts at resettlement and "return to normal" can be.

A central theme highlighted by the authors is institutional breakdown, especially the failure of militarised control. They note that the film takes a darker approach than its predecessor by stressing that authorities are unable to stop the renewed spread or reliably protect civilians. Containment measures collapse, and the resulting escalation is framed as catastrophic, reinforcing the idea that large systems meant to provide safety can become ineffective under crisis conditions. In addition, the authors present the virus and the occupation-style reconstruction as an allegory for contemporary geopolitics, explicitly linking the film's setting and military strategy to the US-led Iraq War and its reconstruction efforts. The comparison frames the fortified zone and its unravelling as reflecting the limits of imposed order, with early signs of control giving way to bloodshed and failure. They conclude that the film rejects consoling closure and instead underscores a bleak claim: the "new world" promised by recovery efforts may be unattainable, and the trajectory points toward large-scale, possibly global collapse.

Finally, the authors note the film's focus on family as both a symbol of hope and a catalyst for disaster, serving as the immediate route by which the infection returns at full scale. The intimate bonds, including attempts at reunion and forgiveness, become entangled with transmission and collapse the fragile stability of the "safe" zone.

== Sequel ==
Following the release of 28 Weeks Later, a third instalment spent years in development as the unproduced 28 Months Later, with the project ultimately stalling amidst a combination of creative differences, scheduling conflicts, and later industry shifts, before being set aside. When Danny Boyle and Alex Garland returned to the series, they instead launched 28 Years Later as the first entry in a new trilogy shaped more directly by the approach of the original film, rather than by the intervening sequel's specific plot directions. In doing so, the third film recontextualises major elements introduced in 28 Weeks Later, including the earlier sequel's revelation that some individuals may be naturally immune to the Rage Virus, an idea Boyle said the new film does not pursue. It also reverses the prior sequel's closing suggestion that the outbreak had spread into mainland Europe by opening with on-screen context indicating that French forces drove the infection back across the English Channel, restoring the narrative focus to an isolated Britain.
