= Teshkeel Comics =

Kuwaiti comic book publisher

Teshkeel Comics تشكيل كومكس
- Company type: Private
- Industry: Publishing
- Founded: 2006
- Founder: Dr. Naif Al-Mutawa
- Headquarters: Safat, 13048 Kuwait
- Key people: Dr. Naif Al-Mutawa, Editor-in-chief
- Products: Comics
- Parent: Teshkeel Media Group

Teshkeel Comics (Arabic: تشكيل كومكس, romanized: taškeel komiks, or more formally تشكيل للقصص المصورة taškeel li-l-qiṣaṣ al-muṣawwara) is a Kuwaiti comic book publisher, and a division of Teshkeel Media Group, a company focused on creating, re-engineering and exploiting all forms of children's media based on or infused with localised culture in the Middle East.

== History ==
Teshkeel Comics was founded by Dr. Naif Al-Mutawa while studying for his M.B.A. at Columbia Business School in 2003. In 2005, Teshkeel had established a partnership with Marvel Comics to publish their comic book titles in the Arabic language to be released for audiences in the Middle East and North African regions, which are an Arab-speaking majority. On March 16, 2006, Teshkeel released their first published comic, which was an issue of The Spectacular Spider-Man in Arabic. Teshkeel also made deals with DC Comics and Archie Comics to publish and distribute their own comic book titles in Arabic the same way.

Other than translating American comics, Teshkeel also published an original superhero comic book series, The 99. The 99 debuted in May 2006, and continued to be published until September 2013. Teshkeel published The 99 in English, Arabic, and Bahasa Indonesian, among other languages. The 99 was distributed in North America via Diamond Comic Distributors.

Teshkeel Comics also published a licensed children's magazine based on Cartoon Network's characters and series. This magazine was published in both English and Arabic.

== Published works ==
=== Original titles ===
- The 99 (Arabic and English)

=== Licensed titles ===
- Archie (Arabic only)
- Archie and Friends (Arabic only)
- The Batman Adventures (Arabic only; based on Volume 2)
- Cartoon Network Magazine (Arabic and English)
- Hulk (Arabic only; based on the 2000 series)
- Marvel (Arabic only; umbrella title for various stories of miscellaneous Marvel characters, such as Fantastic Four)
- The Spectacular Spider-Man (Arabic only)
- Superman Adventures (Arabic only)
- Ultimate Spider-Man (Arabic only)
- Ultimate X-Men (Arabic only)
